= Ibong Adarna =

19th-century Filipino poem

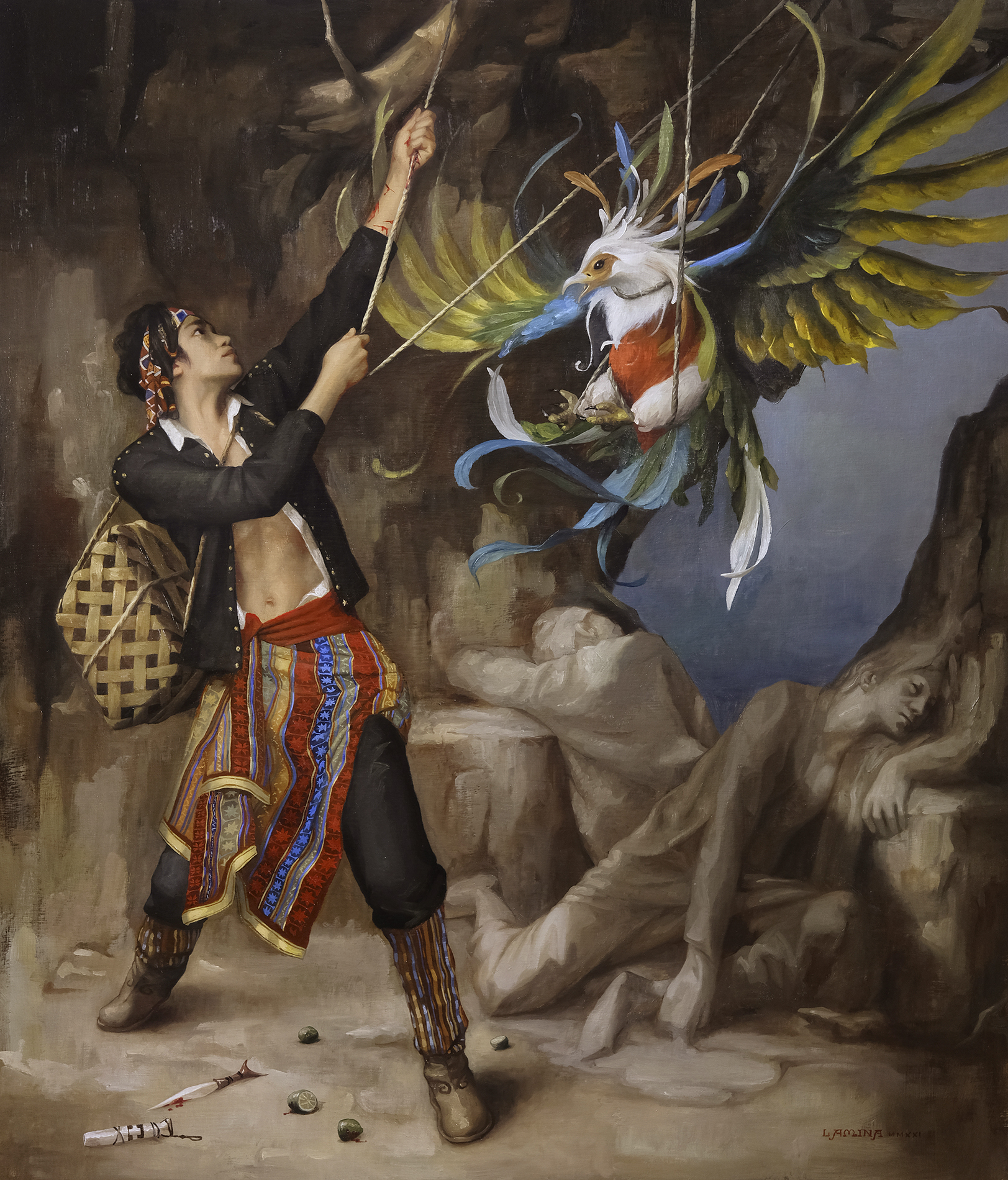
- Ibong Adarna, Painting by Nat Lamina, 2022
- Author: unknown (attributed)
- Original title: Korido at Buhay na Pinagdaanan ng Tatlong Prinsipeng Magkakapatid na anak nang Haring Fernando at Reyna Valeriana sa Kahariang Berbania (Filipino)
- Language: Tagalog
- Genre: Fantasy, Folk-tale
- Publication place: Philippines

Ibong Adarna (also known in English as The Adarna Bird), is an early 19th century Filipino epic poem that centers around a magical bird of the same name. During the Spanish era, the story was anonymously published with the title of Corrido at Buhay na Pinagdaanan ng Tatlong Prinsipeng Magcacapatid na anac ni Haring Fernando at ni Reyna Valeriana sa Cahariang Berbanya (transl. Corrido and life lived by three princes, children of King Fernando and Queen Valeriana in the Kingdom of Berbania). Some researchers suggest that the tale may have been influenced by similar European stories.

The narrative focuses on the lives of King Fernando, Queen Valeriana, and their three sons: Don Pedro, Diego, and Juan. Upon learning of their father's incurable illness, the three princes embark on a quest to find the legendary Adarna bird, whose healing powers can save their father. The prince who successfully brings back the bird will inherit the throne.

While the story is commonly attributed to the Tagalog poet José de la Cruz or "Huseng Sisiw," the actual authorship remains unproven. Contrary to popular belief, Ibong Adarna was not brought to the Philippines by Miguel López de Legazpi, as was the case with other European stories. According to Eulogio B. Rodriguez, assistant director of the National Library in 1933, the tale is of Pre-Spanish origin and represents indigenous Philippine literature. However, it does bear some influences from 19th-century European romances, which infuse it with a medieval chivalry atmosphere. It holds a comparable status, or possibly even parallels, with the Arabian Nights' Entertainments, a book included in the reading materials of both public and private schools.

Ibong Adarna is included in the curriculum for Grade 7 Junior High School students in the Philippines.

== Plot ==
King Fernando and Queen Valeriana of the Kingdom of Berbanya have three sons: Don Pedro, Don Diego, and Don Juan. King Fernando falls ill after a dream in which he sees Don Juan being murdered. Desperate for a cure, he sends Don Pedro to find the Ibong Adarna, a magical bird known for its healing songs. Don Pedro embarks on a journey and eventually encounters the bird, but it sings seven songs that lull him to sleep. It then defecates on him, turning him into stone.

Next, Don Diego is sent on the same mission and suffers a similar fate. Three years later, Don Juan sets out on his quest and meets an old hermit who warns him about the bird's enchantments. The hermit provides him with a knife and dayap lemons to stay awake during the bird's songs, with instructions to create cuts on his arm with the knife and to put the dayap on the wounds. He also gives him a golden rope to capture the bird and a bucket of water to revive his petrified brothers.

Don Juan successfully captures the Ibong Adarna, restores his brothers, and heads back to the palace. However, Don Pedro and Don Diego grow envious and beat Don Juan, leaving him unconscious on a road. They deceive the king, claiming they don't know what happened to Don Juan but that the bird awaits its true captor. Don Juan eventually recovers and forgives his brothers.

As a punishment, Don Pedro and Don Diego are supposedly killed, but Don Juan forgave them, and pleaded to his father not to, which because of that King Fernando, took it into consideration and instead tasked them to take care of the bird. Don Pedro and Don Diego were already planning once Don Juan was asleep when it was his turn with the Adarna Bird. They agreed to release the Adarna from its cage, and upon waking up, Juan realizes and flees. Afraid his father would scold him for his irresponsibility.

Don Juan continues his journey with the Ibong Adarna followed by his brothers, finding refuge on Mt. Armenia. They come across a well, and while exploring it, Don Juan discovers two enchanted "palaces". Inside, he rescues Princess Juana and Princess Leonora from a giant and a seven-headed serpent, respectively. However, his brothers betray him by cutting the rope that he was tied to while he descends, causing him to fall to the bottom of the well.

Don Diego marries Princess Juana, and Don Pedro plans to marry Princess Leonora after a seven-year delay. Don Juan was heavily injured, but was cured with the help of Princess Leonora's wolf, who she has sent. and sets out to find his way back to the Kingdom. With the guidance of an eagle and the initial advice of the Adarna Bird, he reaches the Kingdom of Reino de Los Cristales. There, he encounters a crystal lake where three princesses bathe. Don Juan steals a dress belonging to one of the princesses and falls in love with her. The ruler in this kingdom, King Salermo, was very angry and disproved of their relationship. So he gave Don Juan seven trials in which he passed all, so King Salermo tries to kill Don Juan, and out of pure anger, he cast a curse on them that when they step foot in Berbanya, Don Juan would forget Doña Maria, and he dies of his rage. So both of them, flee the pursuing king. but were separated when Don Juan leaves her to make preparations for their entry into the Berbanian Kingdom.

Back in the Berbanian Kingdom, Don Juan forgets his love for the princess from Reino de Los Cristales and falls in love with Princess Leonora again. However, when the wedding took place, Doña Maria, the princess he was truly in love— was dressed in pilgrim clothing— arrives. Doña Maria uses the jar in which the negrito people were placed to make him regain his memory, which he does. So, Don Juan reunites with Doña Maria, and was supposedly crowned King of Berbania by his father, but Don Juan gave the kingdom to Don Pedro and Princess Leonora, and returns to Reino de los Cristales, where he became king, and Doña Maria became queen.

The tale ends with Don Juan and Doña Maria's coronation, symbolizing their reunion and the restoration of happiness in Reyno de Los Cristales.

== Description ==
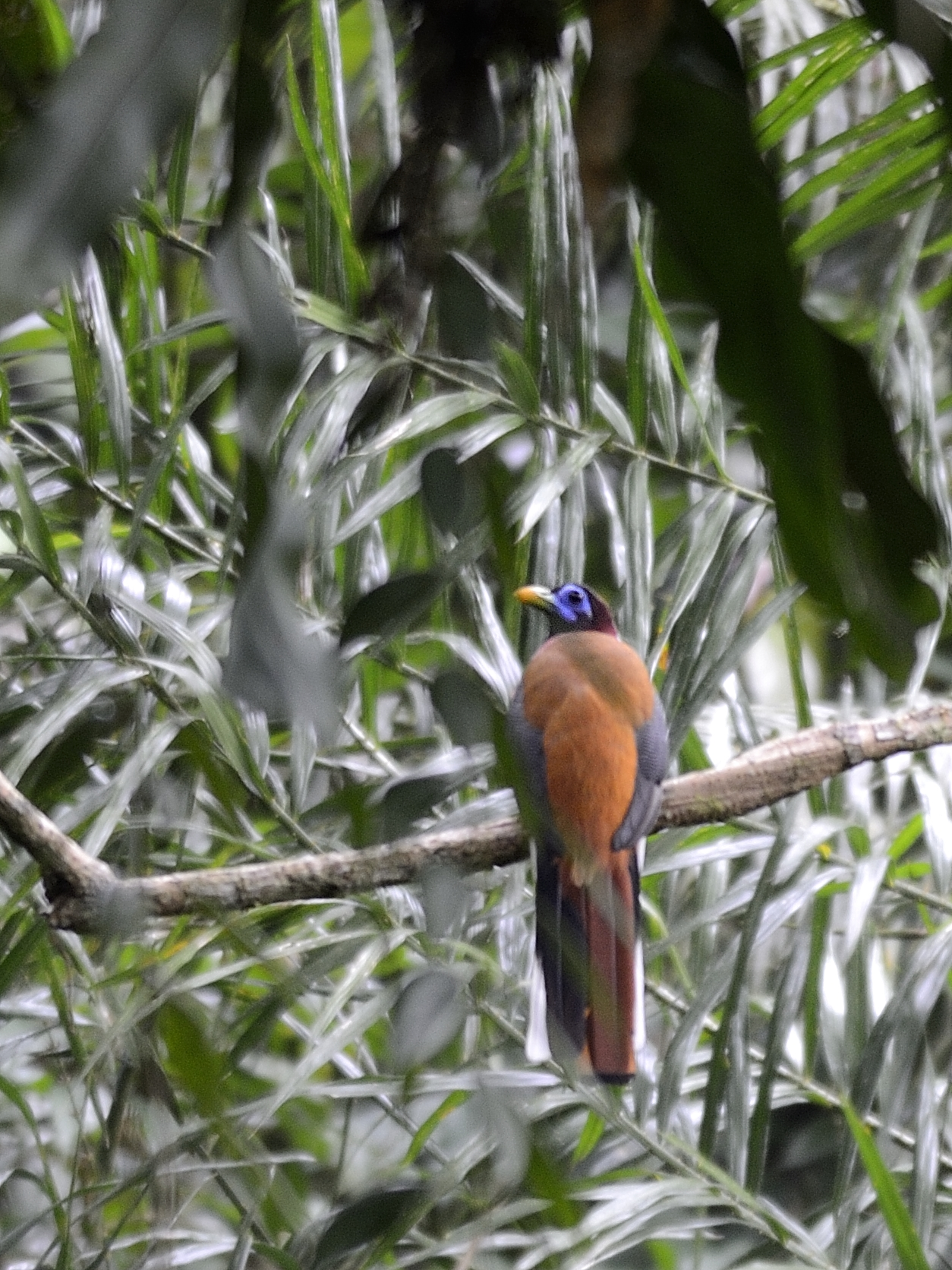
The Philippine trogon's vivid colors earned it the nickname "Ibong Adarna".

The Ibong Adarna is often described as the most colorful bird in Philippine folklore. It is also thought to share a resemblance to other legendary birds such as the Sarimanok and the phoenix.

Being one of the most colorful birds endemic in the Philippines, local birders associate the Philippine trogon (Harpactes ardens) to the mythical bird.

== Analysis ==
According to professor Damiana Eugenio, the Ibong Adarna or The Adarna Bird epic reworks and combines themes from recognizable folktales of the international Aarne-Thompson-Uther Index, namely types ATU 551, "The Sons on a Quest for a Wonderful Remedy for their Father"; ATU 301, "The Three Stolen Princesses" (hero's descent into a lower world, pit or hole to rescue kidnapped princesses), and ATU 313, "The Magic Flight" (hero meets villain's daughter and falls in love with her; her father imposes tasks on the hero; hero and villain's daughter escape together at the end of the tale).

According to Dean Fansler, the romance is very popular in the archipelago, with at least five different language printings: Tagalog, Pampango, Visayan, Ilocano and Bicol. The differences between the literary versions led Fansler to believe in a folkloric origin for the tale.

== Cultural significance ==
Ibong Adarna is a part of Filipino culture. It's significancy and importance has brought it to be in Grade 7 students curriculum.

== In other media ==
The story of Ibong Adarna is known all over the Philippines and has been told in different languages and media.

=== Filming ===
Film	Starring	Produced by	Directed by	Date Released
Ibong Adarna	Mila del Sol (Prinsesa Maria), Fred Cortes (Prinsipe Juan), Ester Magalona, Deanna Prieto, and Ben Rubio	LVN Pictures	Vicente Salumbides and Manuel Conde	October 17, 1941
Ang Ibong Adarna	Nida Blanca, Nestor de Villa, Carlos Salazar, Cecilia Lopez, Nita Javier, Jose Vergara	LVN Pictures	Manuel Conde	July 4, 1955
Ibong Adarna	Dolphy (Prince Adolfo), Panchito Alba (Prince Alfonso), Babalu (Prince Albano), Rosanna Ortiz (Ibong Adarna)	Roda Films	Pablo Santiago	November 3, 1972
Ang Hiwaga ng Ibong Adarna	Dolphy (Prince Adolfo), Panchito Alba (Prince Alfonso), Babalu (Prince Albano), Rosanna Ortiz (Ibong Adarna)	RTL Productions, Roda Film Productions	Pablo Santiago	November 3, 1972
Si Prinsipe Abante at ang Lihim ng Ibong Adarna	Rene Requiestas (Prinsipe Abante), Monica Herrera (Prinsesa Luningning), Paquito Diaz (Prinsipe Atras), Joaquin Fajardo (Prinsipe Urong-Sulong), Ruben Rustia (Ang Hari)	Tagalog Pictures, Regal Films	Tony Cruz	December 25, 1990
Ang TV Movie: The Adarna Adventure	Nida Blanca (Lola Binyang), Tirso Cruz III (Prinsipe Diego), Dindo Arroyo (Prinsipe Pedro), Gio Alvarez (Prinsipe Juan), Jolina Magdangal (Prinsesa Adarna), Gamaliel Viray (Hari ng Berbanya)	Star Cinema	Johnny Manahan	October 2, 1996
Adarna: The Mythical Bird	Jolina Magdangal (voice of Adarna), Marvin Agustin (voice), Martin Nievera (voice), Regine Velasquez (voice)	FLT Films International, Guiding Light Productions	Geirry A. Garccia	December 25, 1997
Ibong Adarna: The Pinoy Adventure	Rocco Nacino (Prinsipe Sigasig), Karen Gallman (Adarna)	Gurion Entertainment	Jun Urbano	October 1, 2014

==== 1940s ====
Narcisa "Doña Sisang" de Leon of LVN Studios produced the first two Ibong Adarna films. The first one, made in 1941, starred Mila del Sol as Prinsesa Maria, Fred Cortes as Prinsipe Juan, Ester Magalona, Vicente Oliver, Deanna Prieto, Ben Rubio and Angeles Gayoso who voiced the Ibong Adarna. It had a magical sequence that showed the singing of the bird. That used a painstakingly hand-painted process called "Varicolor", where the bird was colorized in this otherwise black and white film. LVN was able to archive copies of the film which was shown again in theaters after the war in the late 40s and 50s.

==== 1950s ====
Fifteen years later, in 1956, LVN produced a second version, this time under the full direction of an older Manuel Conde, and starred Nida Blanca, Nestor de Villa, Carlos Salazar, Cecilia Lopez, Nita Javier and Jose Vergara. The 1956 film was the first Filipino commercial film shot and shown in its entirety in Eastman Color.

==== 1970s ====
Roda Film Productions produced two films, Ibong Adarna (1972) and its sequel Ang Hiwaga ng Ibong Adarna (1973) starring Dolphy as the lead Prince Adolfo and comedians Panchito Alba as Prince Alfonso, Babalu as Prince Albano and Rosanna Ortiz as the Ibong Adarna.

==== 1990s ====
Tagalog Pictures, Inc. produced the film Si Prinsipe Abante at ang Lihim ng Ibong Adarna in 1990 starring comedian Rene Requiestas as the lead Prinsipe Abante (forward), Paquito Diaz as Prinsipe Atras (retreat), Joaquin Fajardo as Prinsipe Urong-Sulong (synonymous to atras-abante; back and forth) and Monica Herrera as Prinsesa Luningning/the Ibong Adarna.

In 1996, Star Cinema produced the film Ang TV Movie: The Adarna Adventure. Jolina Magdangal played the Ibong Adarna/Prinsesa Adarna. The cast included Nida Blanca as Lola Binyang, Tirso Cruz III as Prinsipe Diego, Dindo Arroyo as Prinsipe Pedro, Gio Alvarez as Prinsipe Juan and Gamaliel Viray as Hari ng Berbanya along with the kids and teens of Ang TV.

Adarna: The Mythical Bird which premiered on December 25, 1997, is the first Filipino full-length theatrical animated film. It stars Jolina Magdangal – who previously played the Ibong Adarna – as the voice of Princess Carmona along with other voice casts: Marvin Agustin, Martin Nievera and Regine Velasquez. Nievera and Velasquez sung the soundtrack "Touched by Your Love" and "Nagmamahal", "Believe It" was performed by Velasquez and "Halakhak" by The Youth.

==== 2010s ====
A young man sets out on a dangerous quest for a magical bird with the power to heal any ailment in "Ibong Adarna: The Pinoy Adventure". The 2014 film starred Rocco Nacino as Prinsipe Sigasig, Joel Torre as Sultan Mabait, Angel Aquino as Sultana Mabunyi, Leo Martinez as Datu Maimbot, Benjie Paras as Sipsipayo, Ronnie Lazaro as Dulangkaw, Patricia Fernandez as Diwata, Lilia Cuntapay as Bruha, Gary Lising as Nuno ng Lipi, Miss Intercontinental 2018 Karen Gallman as Adarna and Philip "Kohol" Supnet as Higante.

==== 2020s ====
===== MALA (Movies Adapted from Literary Arts): Ibong Adarna =====
“MALA" (Movies Adapted from Literary Arts), an educational puppetry film series for children directed by actor Xian Lim and written by renowned ventriloquist Ronaldo "Ony" Carcamo, is part of the Cultural Center of the Philippines' "Sining Sigla", a season-long virtual outreach program of the CCP Office of the President Arsenio "Nick" Lizaso. Lim and Carcamo used muppets, visual effects and live action with music and poetry in the dialogue on their adaptation. MALA's production designers are shadowplay and puppet designer Aina Ramolete and production designer and art director Kaye Banaag. Joined by music composer Jem Florendo and sound designer Miguel Hernandez.

===== New 4K Digital Scan of Ibong Adarna (1941) =====
In time for the 100th year of Philippine cinema, Cinema One brought the film that was scanned in a high definition 4K resolution back via cable TV on June 30, 2019.

Ibong Adarna was the opening full-length film of the 12th Cinema Rehiyon held on February 24–28, 2020, at Naga City, Camarines Sur.

=== Television ===
In 2013, GMA Network produced Adarna, a contemporary television series adaptation starring Kylie Padilla in the title role.

In the 50th episode of season 1 of GMA's drama fantasy anthology series Daig Kayo ng Lola Ko which aired on April 22, 2018, lola Goreng (Gloria Romero) narrated the story of the Ibong Adarna. The episode starred Kyline Alcantara as Ibong Adarna, Jeric Gonzales as Juan, Lucho Ayala as Pedro, Aaron Yanga as Diego and Rey 'PJ' Abellana as Fernando.

=== Theater ===
==== Ballet ====
Ballet Manila soloist Abigail Oliveiro took on the role of Ibong Adarna with Mark Sumaylo as Don Pedro, Romeo Peralta as Don Diego and Ballet Manila's Principal dancer Rudy de Dios as Don Juan.

It featured music by Diwa de Leon, with Gia Macuja Atchison as the voice of Ibong Adarna, and script by Angela Blardony Ureta.

Ballet Manila's CEO and artistic director Lisa Macuja-Elizalde described the show as "a modern ballet with neo-classical and classical styles that serve as the cornerstone of the dance vocabulary." It even featured the Alitaptap (lit. 'firefly') Dance and the Monkey Dance. It made its world premiere on August 26, 2017, at the Aliw Theater stage.

==== Musical ====
REP staged an English version of the epic which featured fun, child-friendly music, and bright and colorful costumes.

== Art and literature ==
The Adarna House is a Philippine publishing house.

An interactive ebook version of the epic including animation and sound was released for the iPad. Project Gutenberg also has a version of the epic in its library.

=== Books ===
Title	Retelling by	Illustrations by	Year	ISBN	Pages
Ibong Adarna	Virgilio S. Almario	Jordan Santos	1980	971-508-125-8	32
Ibong Adarna (Board Book)		Jason Sto. Domingo	2015	978-971-508-565-6	18
Ibong Adarna (Complete Text)	Virgilio S. Almario		2016	978-971-508-606-6	268
Magkulay Tayo ng Kuwento 9: Ibong Adarna	Virgilio S. Almario	Jordan Santos	2020	978-971-508-843-5	20

=== National costume in beauty pageants ===
Miss Universe 2018 Catriona Gray’s preliminary gown by Mak Tumang at the Miss Universe preliminary competition was called "Adarna: Blazing Siren.” Her gown which was inspired by the Ibong Adarna and the Phoenix Mikimoto Crown was adorned with layers of embroidered gold feathers and thousands of hand-placed genuine Swarovski crystals in different shades of orange and topaz; she paired it with a nationalistic pair of dangling earrings she designed herself, Tessera Jewelry executed her vision with the Philippine sun and golden South sea pearls.

== See also ==
- Florante at Laura
- Noli Me Tángere
- El filibusterismo
