= Ibong Adarna (1941 film) =

1941 fantasy adventure film by Vicente Salumbides

- Original theatrical poster
- Directed by: Vicente Salumbides; Manuel Conde (Note: Technical supervision)
- Written by: Vicente Salumbides
- Based on: Ibong Adarna
- Produced by: Narcisa de León
- Starring: Mila del Sol; Fred Cortes; Ester Magallona; Deanna Prieto; Ben Rubio
- Cinematography: Ray Lacap; Serafin Salumbides; Remegio Young
- Edited by: Enrique Jarlego
- Music by: Francisco Buencamino
- Production company: LVN Pictures
- Distributed by: LVN Pictures
- Release date: October 17, 1941
- Running time: 131 minutes
- Country: Philippines
- Language: Filipino

Ibong Adarna is a 1941 Philippine fantasy adventure film written and directed by Vicente Salumbides, with Manuel Conde as the technical supervisor. A film adaptation of the epic poem of the same name, it stars Mila del Sol, Fred Cortes, Ester Magallona, Deanna Prieto, and Ben Rubio, with Angeles Gayoso providing the voice of the mythical bird.

Produced and distributed by LVN Pictures for its 3rd founding anniversary, the film was originally released in black and white and is the first Philippine film with a color sequence.

== Synopsis ==
King Fernando of Berbanya, suffering from a serious illness, tasks his sons to find the "Ibong Adarna". The king is advised that the bird's song could cure his affliction. Whoever is successful would be the next in line for the Berbanya throne. His eldest son Pedro head to Mount Tabor refusing to help a hungry old man he encounters along the way. He manages to find the bird at the summit but falls asleep by its song and gets petrified. Fernando's second eldest son Diego also had the same experience and likewise ends turning to stone. Juan, the youngest son, goes to the same mountain. Unlike his brothers he shared his food supply with the old man, catches the bird without turning to stone himself, and undoes the petrification of his siblings.

Juan finds himself within a love triangle. While in his wedding, a woman with magical powers disrupts the ceremony. The woman, Princess Maria, who had helped Juan in the past, conjures an illusion to remind him of their previous relationship.

== Cast ==
- Mila del Sol as Princess Maria
- Fred Cortes as Don Juan
- Ester Magallona
- Deanna Prieto
- Ben Rubio
- Angeles Gayoso as the Ibong Adarna (voice)
- Cecilio Joaquin
- Rosario Lam
- Miguel Anzures
- Canuplin
- Juan Rodriguez
- Regio Villa
- Amador Allegre

== Production ==
Ibong Adarna was produced under LVN Pictures with Vicente Salumbides responsible for the story and direction. Manuel Conde supervised Salumbides and provided the technical direction for the film. Narcisa de León was the producer.

Originally released in black and white, Ibong Adarna was shortly re-released in color. It is the first Philippine film with a color sequence, with each frame manually hand-painted. For a time, it was the only known Philippine film to be in nitrate form.

Its costume and set design has been noted to follow a Middle Eastern theme with King Fernando's palace resembling that of an Arabian sultan. Princess Maria's family was inspired from indigenous Philippine folklore.

== Release ==
External videos
- "Ibong Adarna (1941), Before and After Plug", preview video on the restoration of Ibong Adarna by ABS-CBN Film Restoration

Ibong Adarna was released around 1941 prior to the outbreak of World War II in Asia. A copy of the film would be stored at ABS-CBN's archives.

Under ABS-CBN Film Restoration's Sagip Pelikula program, Ibong Adarna was restored and re-released in 2020. It was screened at the 12th Cinema Rehiyon held from February 24-28, 2020, in Naga, Camarines Sur. The film was also shown on free-to-air television through ABS-CBN on April 9, 2020 (Maundy Thursday) as part of its Holy Week presentation.
