= 13th Venice International Film Festival =

Italian film festival in 1952

- Location: Venice, Italy
- Founded: 1932
- Awards: Golden Lion of Saint Mark: Forbidden Games
- Festival date: 20 August – 12 September 1952
- Website: Website

Venice Film Festival chronology
- 14th 12th

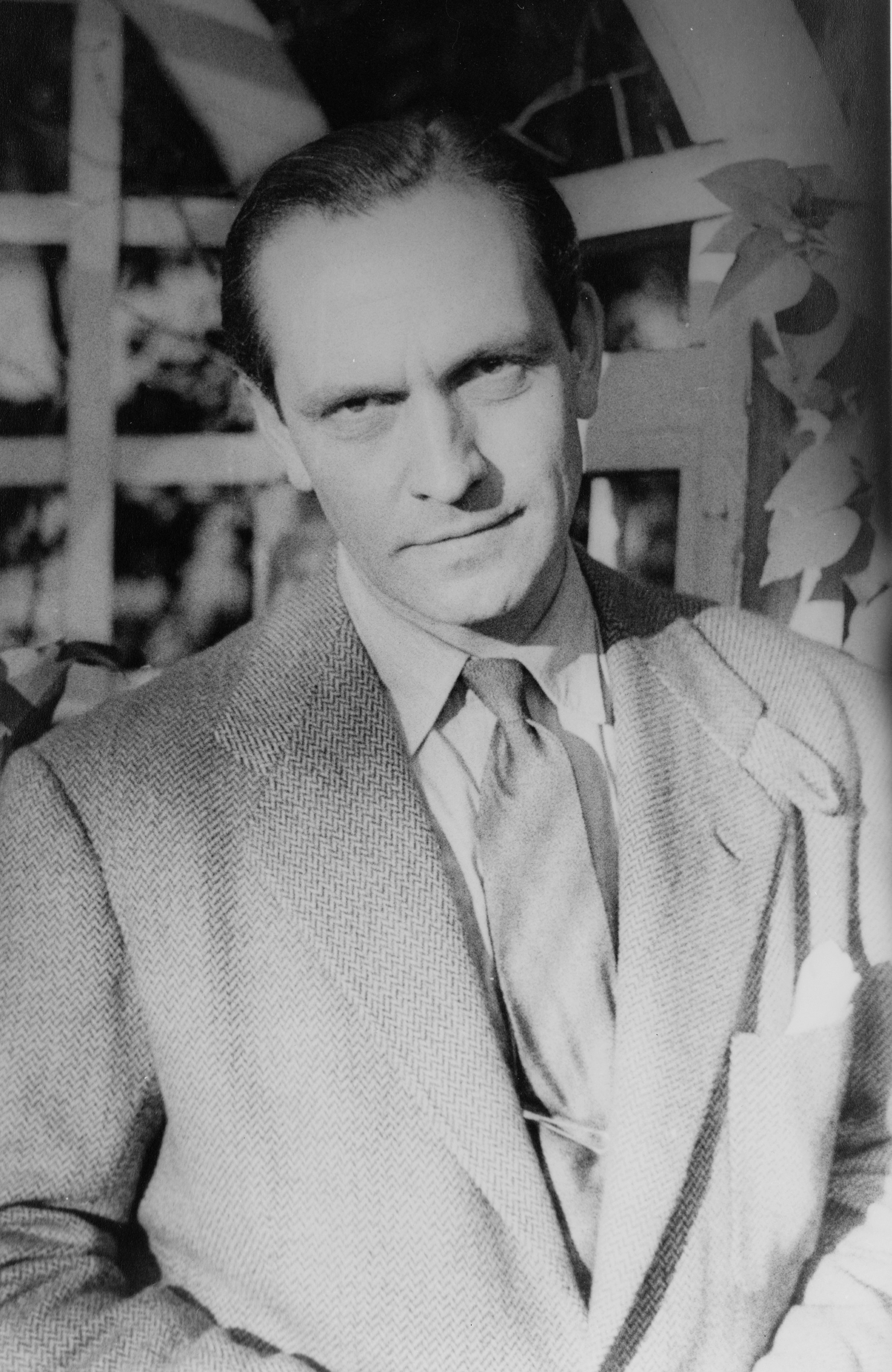
Fredric March, 1939

The 13th annual Venice International Film Festival was held from 20 August to 12 September 1952.

Italian film critic Mario Gromo, was the jury president for the main competition. The Golden Lion of Saint Mark was awarded to Forbidden Games by René Clément.

== Jury ==
- Mario Gromo, Italian film critic — Jury President
- Sandro De Feo
- Enrico Falqui, Italian writer
- Pericle Fazzini
- Enzo Masetti, Italian composer
- Luigi Rognoni
- Filippo Sacchi
- Carlo Trabucco
- Giuseppe Ungaretti, Italian writer

== Official Sections ==
=== Main Competition ===
English title	Original title	Director(s)	Production country
Andrine and Kjell	Andrine og Kjell	Kåre Bergstrøm	Norway
Beauties of the Night	Les Belles de nuit	René Clair	France
The Brave Don't Cry		Philip Leacock	United Kingdom
Carrie		William Wyler	United States
Cruel Winds	Aandhiyan	Chetan Anand	India
Dark River	Las aguas bajan turbias	Hugo del Carril	Argentina
Death of a Salesman		László Benedek	United States
Dishonor	Deshonra	Daniel Tinayre	Argentina
Europe '51	Europa '51	Roberto Rossellini	Italy
The Eyes Leave a Trace	Los ojos dejan huellas	José Luis Sáenz de Heredia	Italy, Spain
Forbidden Games	Jeux interdits	René Clément	France
The Importance of Being Earnest		Anthony Asquith	United Kingdom
Genghis Khan	Ang Buhay ni Genghis Khan	Manuel Conde	Philippines
Judas	El Judas	Ignacio F. Iquino	Spain
The King and the Mockingbird	Le Roi et l'oiseau	Paul Grimault	France
The Life of Oharu	西鶴一代女	Kenji Mizoguchi	Japan
Mandy		Alexander Mackendrick	United Kingdom
Phone Call from a Stranger		Jean Negulesco	United States
The Quiet Man		John Ford	United States
Sand	Areião	Camillo Mastrocinque	Italy

== Official Awards ==
=== Main Competition ===
- Golden Lion of Saint Mark: Forbidden Games by René Clément
- Special Jury Prize:
  - The Curious Adventures of Mr. Wonderbird by Paul Grimault
  - Mandy by Alexander Mackendrick
- Volpi Cup for Best Actor: Fredric March for Death of a Salesman
- Volpi Cup for Best Actress: Ingrid Bergman for Europe '51
  - Note: The Volpi Cup was not awarded to her in 1952 because she was dubbed (by Lydia Simoneschi) in the version presented at the Festival. However, in 1992 she was awarded posthumously. The prize was accepted by her son Roberto Rossellini.
- Best Original Screenplay: Nunnally Johnson for Phone Call from a Stranger
- Best Original Music: Georges Auric for La Putain respectueuse
- Best Production Design: Carmen Dillon for The Importance of Being Earnest

== Independent Awards ==
=== International Award ===
- Europe '51 by Roberto Rossellini
- The Quiet Man by John Ford
- The Life of Oharu by Kenji Mizoguchi

=== FIPRESCI Prize ===
- Beauties of the Night by René Clair

=== OCIC Award ===
- The Quiet Man by John Ford

=== Pasinetti Award ===
- The Quiet Man by John Ford
