= Guronasyon Foundation National High School =

Public high school in Rizal, Philippines

Guronasyon Foundation Inc. National High School
- Mataas na Paaralang Nasyonal ng Guronasyon Foundation Inc.

Location
- National Road Brgy. Bilibiran, Binangonan, Rizal; Philippines; 14°29′59″N 121°10′25″E

Information
- Type: Comprehensive National High School
- Established: 2007 as National High School
- Grades: 7 to 10
- Enrollment: 3,000+ (SY 2012-2013)
- Colors: Green and white
- Nickname: GFINHS

Guronasyon Foundation Inc. National High School is a public high school situated at Bilibiran, Binangonan, Rizal, Philippines.

== History ==
GFINHS was established in 2007 aiming to diminish the increasing enrollment at its mother school, Vicente Madrigal National High School. It was named after the foundation of Congressman Michael John Duavit who donated the land where GFINHS is constructed. It started its operation on June 4, 2007.

On June 15, 2007, the school was officially separated from its mother school.

== Curricula ==
The school uses two curricula, the RBEC Curriculum (for RBEC students) and the K-12 Curriculum (for the K-12 students), both using the zero-based grading system for each period.

=== List of Subjects ===
The table below lists the subjects taken by the students of Guronasyon Foundation Inc. National High School.

Subjects	Grade Seven	Grade Eight	Grade Nine	Grade Ten
Science	General Science	Biology	Chemistry	Physics
Mathematics	Elementary Algebra	Intermediate Algebra	Geometry	Advanced Algebra, Trigonometry, and Statistics
English	Grammar and Philippine Literature	Grammar and Afro-Asian Literature	Grammar and American Literature	Grammar and World Literature
Filipino	Pag-unawa with Ibong Adarna	Gramatika with Florante at Laura	Panitikang Pilipino with Noli Me Tangere	Panitikang Asyano with El Filibusterismo
Social Studies (AP)	Philippine History and Government	Asian History	World History	Economics
Music, Arts, Physical Education & Health (MAPEH)	Music, Arts, Physical Education & Health 7	Music, Arts, Physical Education & Health 8	Music, Arts, Physical Education & Health 9	Music, Arts, Physical Education & Health 10, Citizenship Advancement Training I (CAT I)
Technology and Livelihood Education	Agriculture, Culinary arts, Electronics, Drafting, or Business Management	Agriculture, Culinary arts, Electronics, Drafting, or Business Management	Agriculture, Culinary arts, Electronics, Drafting, or Business Management	Agriculture, Culinary arts, Electronics, Drafting, or Business Management
Values	Values Education 7	Values Education 8	Values Education 9	Values Education 10

== Gallery ==
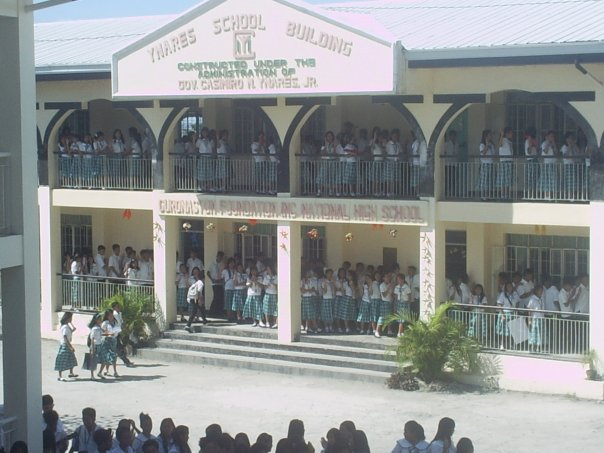
GFINHS school building 2

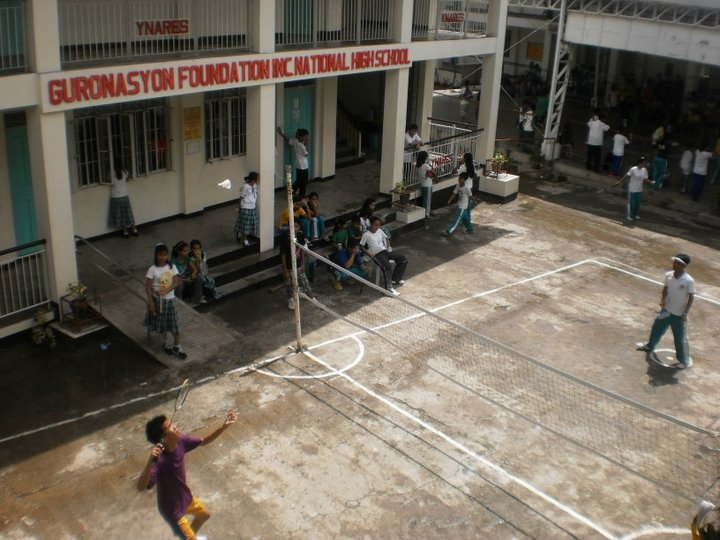
GFINHS school grounds

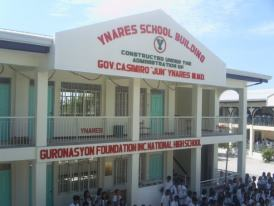
GFINHS school building 3

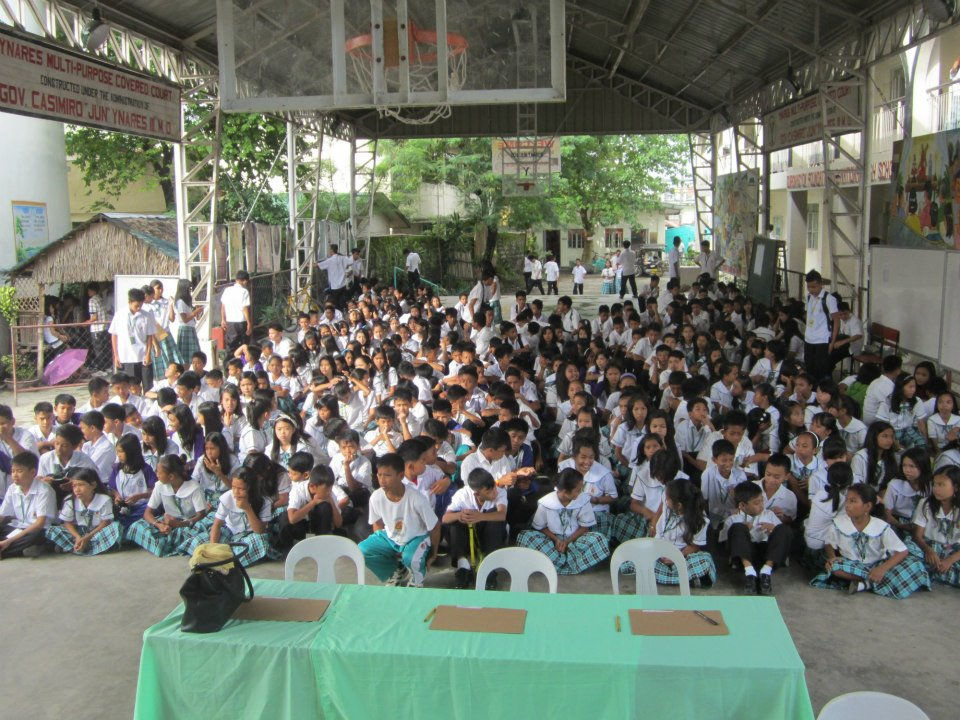
GFINHS covered court

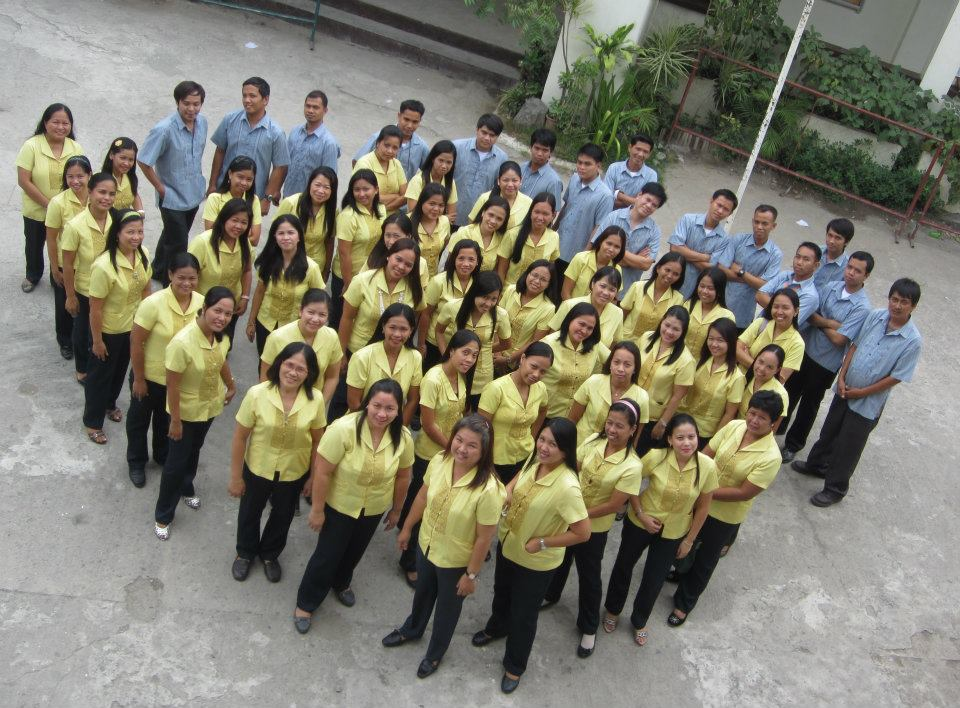
GFINHS faculty

== See also ==
- Binangonan, Rizal
- Rizal
- Vicente Madrigal National High School
