= Hilda Crane =

1956 film by Philip Dunne

- Theatrical release poster
- Directed by: Philip Dunne
- Written by: Philip Dunne
- Based on: Hilda Crane by Samson Raphaelson
- Produced by: Herbert B. Swope, Jr.
- Starring: Jean Simmons; Guy Madison; Jean-Pierre Aumont; Evelyn Varden; Peggy Knudsen
- Cinematography: Joseph MacDonald
- Edited by: David Bretherton
- Music by: David Raksin
- Production company: 20th Century Fox
- Distributed by: 20th Century Fox
- Release date: May 2, 1956 (United States)
- Running time: 87 minutes
- Country: United States
- Language: English
- Budget: $1,140,000
- Box office: $1 million (US rentals)

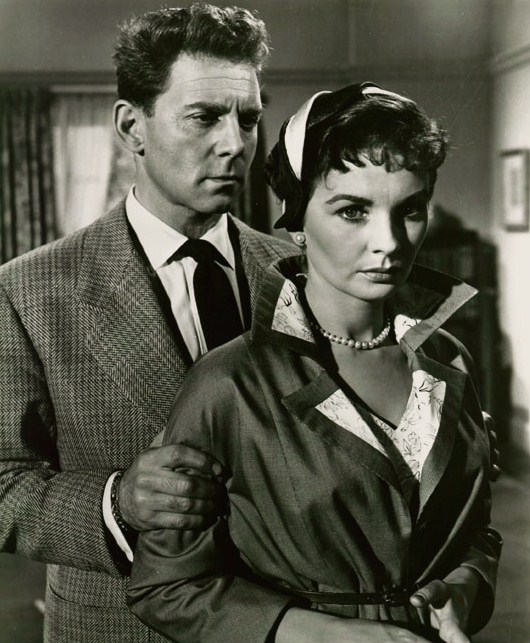
Jean-Pierre Aumont and Jean Simmons

Hilda Crane (also known as The Many Loves of Hilda Crane) is a 1956 American drama film made by 20th Century Fox. It was directed by Philip Dunne and produced by Herbert B. Swope Jr. from a screenplay adapted by Dunne from the play by Samson Raphaelson. The music score was by David Raksin and the cinematography by Joseph MacDonald. The film was made in Technicolor and Cinemascope.

The film stars Jean Simmons, Guy Madison, and Jean-Pierre Aumont, with Evelyn Varden and Peggy Knudsen.

== Plot ==
In the five years since she left Winona, her hometown, Hilda Crane has been divorced twice and acquired quite a dubious reputation. She returns from New York to a scolding mother, who hopes Hilda will have the good sense to marry successful builder Russell Burns and finally settle down.

A former professor and lover, Jacques DeLisle, is still holding a grudge because Hilda left him for an athlete. Although she doesn't love Russell, she resists and resents Jacques' aggressive romantic advances. She accepts a proposal of marriage from Russell, who intends to build her a new house.

Warned by a friend about Russell's possessive mother, including her way of feigning a heart condition, Hilda declines a $50,000 bribe from Mrs. Burns to leave town. She leaves the elderly woman slumped in a chair and proceeds to the church for the wedding. Mrs. Burns was not pretending this time, however, and has died.

Months later, still living in her mother-in-law's house, Hilda has begun to drink while Russell becomes indifferent to her and morose. A day comes when Hilda's mother castigates her again and she can't take any more. Hilda swallows a bottle of sleeping pills, intent on committing suicide. But she survives and is cheered by Russell's promise to restore their love and start building their new house.

== Cast ==
- Jean Simmons as Hilda Crane
- Guy Madison as Russell Burns
- Judith Evelyn as Mrs. Crane
- Evelyn Varden as Mrs. Burns
- Gregg Palmer as Dink
- Richard Garrick as Dr. Francis
- Jim Hayward as Mr. Small
- Don Shelton as Caterer
- Helen Mayon as Maid
- Jay Jostyn as Minister
- Peggy Knudsen as Nell Bromley
- Jean-Pierre Aumont as Jacques De Lisle
- Marie Blake as Clara

== Original play ==
The film was based on a play by Samson Raphaelson. The play was based on seven stories Raphaelson had written that were published in Good Housekeeping magazine.

Raphaelson said the play started out "to be a study of the tragic interplay between a mother and a daughter." He wanted to do something that explored a woman torn between wanting independence and being a mother and wife. He struggled to write it over ten years, until he met a woman who was similar to the sort of woman he wanted to write about, and based the play on her. He wrote that the play became "a story of how marriage and love and death happened, at least in this case, to stem from the fumbling, painful efforts of a woman and her mother to understand each other and themselves."

The play was meant to have been presented by the Theatre Guild in 1949. Joan Fontaine had been sought to play the part and was meant to appear in it following her making September Affair. However, she withdrew, saying she did not want to be separated from husband William Dozier. Margaret Sullavan was approached but turned it down saying the play "needed a lot of work". She changed her mind but then withdrew again. Ingrid Bergman turned it down, and June Havoc was considered. Herman Schumlin and Peter Glenville were sought to direct.

Eventually after a year of being unable to get the right star the Theatre Guild withdrew, and Arthur Schwartz, a composer, decided to present it. Jessica Tandy took the lead role, her first on Broadway since Streetcar Named Desire. Raphaelson had directed his own plays in the past but they were comedies and this one was a drama so he sought an outside director "who knows more about it [drama] than I do". Tandy's husband Hume Cronyn was hired to do the job.

The original play had its first performance on Broadway on November 1, 1950, at the Coronet Theatre, directed by Hume Cronyn and designed by Howard Bay. Also in the cast were John Alexander, Beulah Bondi, Frank Sundstrom, Evelyn Varden, and Eileen Heckart. Of the stage cast, only Evelyn Varden appears in the film.

The New York Times called it "well written...and admirably acted...but there is no getting away from the fact the heroine is a tiresome, irritating egotist."

== Production ==
In September 1955, the play was among six properties that 20th Century Fox purchased from the Charles Feldman Group (the others included The Wayward Bus, Lonely Steeple, Tender Mercy, Bernadine and Heaven Knows, Mr Allison).

In November 1955, 20th Century Fox announced that it had purchased the film rights and that the movie would be written and directed by Phillip Dunne. The film was produced by Herbert Swope, his first film since coming from television.

The film initially was announced for Susan Hayward'. In December, the role went to Jean Simmons. Dunne was the screenwriter on three previous 20th Century Fox epic films which star Simmons, The Robe (1953), Demetrius and the Gladiators (1954) and The Egyptian (1954).

Filming started January 4, 1956.

== Reception ==
According to Dunne, the film was neither a critical or financial success.

== See also ==
- List of American films of 1956
