= Athena (1954 film) =

1954 film by Richard Thorpe

- Theatrical release poster
- Directed by: Richard Thorpe
- Written by: William Ludwig; Leonard Spigelgass
- Produced by: Joe Pasternak
- Starring: Jane Powell; Edmund Purdom; Debbie Reynolds; Vic Damone; Louis Calhern; Linda Christian; Evelyn Varden; Ray Collins
- Cinematography: Robert H. Planck
- Edited by: Gene Ruggiero
- Music by: Hugh Martin; Ralph Blane
- Production company: Metro-Goldwyn-Mayer
- Distributed by: Metro-Goldwyn-Mayer
- Release date: November 4, 1954
- Running time: 95 minutes
- Country: United States
- Language: English
- Budget: $1,443,000
- Box office: $1,880,000

Athena is a 1954 American romantic musical comedy film directed by Richard Thorpe and starring Jane Powell, Edmund Purdom, Debbie Reynolds, Vic Damone, Louis Calhern, Steve Reeves, and Evelyn Varden. It was released by Metro-Goldwyn-Mayer.

The film tells the story of a conservative lawyer and his crooning ex-navy buddy whose lives are turned upside down when they meet two sisters from an eccentric family with interests in healthy living and Ancient Greece.

== Plot ==
Johnny Nyle (Vic Damone), a young crooner is filming his performance of a song from the musical “Meet me in St Louis” for his television special. Afterwards, while fans line up to meet him, a young woman confirms his identity and hands him a summons.

Johnny visits the legal office of his former lieutenant from the navy, Adam Calhorn Shaw (Edmund Purdom). Adam's secretary Miss Seely (Kathleen Freeman) says that he needs an appointment to see Adam but Johnny tells Miss Seely to give Adam a message.

Adam is meeting with 3 older gentlemen who are helping him to be elected to Congress, an influential family friend Mr. Grenville (Howard Wendell), Adam's law firm partner Mr. Griswalde (Carl Benton Reid) and Adam's campaign manager for election to the United States Congress Mr. Tremaine (Ray Collins) however Adam is not very cooperative. He is distracted by the death of 5 peach trees he bought from a nursery.

Adam meets with Johnny and learns about Johnny's former agent trying to extract 10% of Johnny's current earnings. They arrange to catch up later at Adam's home.

Arriving at the nursery to complain, Adam meets the energetic and eccentric Athena Mulvain (Jane Powell). Athena offers advice on how to revive the “snobbish” peach trees, however, when she starts discussing how well-matched they are according to numerology Adam becomes uneasy and leaves.

Later, Adam describes his strange encounter with Athena to his fiancé, sophisticated society lady, Beth Hallson (Linda Christian).

Athena arrives and tells Adam's Japanese butler Roy (Henry Nakamura) that she loves him and wants to be friends in Japanese. Athena offers unsolicited advice to Beth about her girdle, offending Beth. Beth leaves as Athena goes outside to mulch Adam's peach trees. Athena sings a happy song about singing called “Vocalise”.

Athena kisses Adam, and goes. On her way out she meets Johnny who flirts with her. Athena says he is too late as she is going to marry Adam, but determines that numerologically he would be perfect for one of her six sisters, Minerva.

Johnny drops off his legal documents in Adam's letterbox and drives Athena to the family health food shop. There he meets Minerva (Debbie Reynolds). She knows of him but dislikes him advertising alcohol and meat products. The sisters determine that Grandpa can fix him. Johnny sings a duet with Minerva called “Imagine”. While Johnny sings of love, Minerva compares Johnny to a weevil that must be exterminated. Despite this, Minerva kisses Johnny at the end of the song.

On Day 2 Athena returns to Adam's house while Adam is having breakfast. Beth appears and is shocked. Adam promises to tell Athena that he has no romantic interest in her, but finds she has left.

Later he asks his legal secretary Miss Seely to search for Athena but to no avail. Johnny returns to the office and tells Adam that he drove Athena to the family health food store, and then drove Athena home.

That night Adam drives to Athena's house. There he meets the meditating Grandma Salome (Evelyn Varden), Minerva and Athena's 5 other beautiful, singing and dancing sisters: Niobe, Aphrodite, Calliope, Medea and Ceres. He also meets the bodybuilders that the girls' grandfather Ulysses Mulvain (Louis Calhern) has been training for the Mr. Universe competition including Ed Perkins (Steve Reeves) and Bill Nichols (Richard DuBois). He is surprised to see Johnny under Grandpa's tutelage.

Adam is invited for dinner and the family sing a reprise of “Vocalise”, this time called “Harmonise”. Adam doesn't want to stay. He demands to talk to Athena. He tells her they cannot be partners. Athena requests a goodbye kiss and Adam honours her request. The kiss turns passionate.

Johnny and Minerva reprise “Imagine”.

Adam returns home and encounters Beth waiting up for him. Adam apologises and breaks up with Beth.

Just when all is looking rosy, Grandma foresees difficult times ahead. Athena's sisters advise Athena to break up with Adam, however Athena chooses to push ahead with the relationship, knowing that "Love can change the stars".

On Day 3, Johnny arrives at the health food store and leaves a gift for Minerva. Ed arrives and confronts Athena about Adam.

Adam arrives at his office and meets his political advisors. They are nervous about Adam breaking up with Beth.

The sisters visit Adam's house while he is out and perform a makeover, removing rugs and screens and installing large urns and fresh flowers. Minerva sings “I never felt better”. Adam's advisers phone Adam's house and reach Athena on the phone. Curious, they visit Adam's house only to find Grandma there in place of the girls. They wait for Adam to return home.

Adam takes Athena to a formal reception at Mr Grenville's home. Athena charms the other guests with her pleasant nature and an off-the-cuff rendition of an aria from a Donizetti opera.

Beth who is Mrs Grenville's niece has helped with catering. Beth presents Athena with a buffet dinner where all of the vegetables are stuffed with meat. Beth and other guests embarrass Athena by insisting she eats meat. Athena storms off angrily.

Athena meets Minerva at the nightclub where Johnny is performing. After he sings “Venezia” Athena leaves suddenly, distressed by her earlier behaviour and losing Adam's love. Minerva informs Johnny that she cannot marry him if Athena doesn't marry Adam due to the stars. Johnny is exasperated and disparages Minerva's beliefs.

Adam is waiting for Athena at her home. He tells her that he still loves her. As he departs, Grandma warns Adam to avoid crowds the next day.

On Day 4, Adam attends the "Mr. Universe" final. Grandma is shocked that Adam ignored her advice. Grandma reveals that Grandpa had hoped that Ed would marry Athena to produce perfect children. The contestants pose to the tango music “Jalousie”.

After a tiebreaker between Ed and another bodybuilder, Ed wins and orders Adam to keep away from Athena by gripping his neck. Adam uses a judo throw to get out of the hold. The TV cameras capture the event live on television. This humiliates grandpa and Ed, and Athena is furious with Adam for ignoring grandma's advice.

Adam is told by his advisers that his political career is over because he embarrassed the belief system of Athena's people, alienating voters with those sympathies, whilst those opposed to their beliefs would now associate Adam with them.

Johnny visits Adam and tells him that Grandpa is encouraging Ed to marry Athena. They both visit the Mulvain house. Bill blocks Johnny's path so Johnny throws Bill using the same judo throw that he and Adam learned in the Navy. Minerva is impressed.

Johnny tells Minerva that “Love can change the stars”. Grandpa refuses to allow Adam to talk to Athena. Adam points out to Grandpa his hypocrisy telling him that love is more important than lettuce and people are more important than vegetables. Adam slams the door as he leaves and Athena comforts Grandpa. Grandpa tells Grandma that Athena and Adam are in love.

The next morning Athena meets Adam suggesting they have ham and eggs. She tells Adam that people are more important than vegetables.

The film ends with Athena singing “Harmonise”. The camera pans back to reveal most of the main players singing along as they sit together on the floor enjoying a Mulvain-style feast of fruit.

== Cast ==
- Jane Powell as Athena Mulvain
- Edmund Purdom as Adam Calhorn Shaw
- Debbie Reynolds as Minerva Mulvain
- Vic Damone as Johnny Nyle
- Louis Calhern as Ulysses Mulvain
- Linda Christian as Beth Hallson
- Evelyn Varden as Salome Mulvain
- Ray Collins as Mr Tremaine
- Carl Benton Reid as Mr Griswalde
- Howard Wendell as Mr Grenville
- Virginia Gibson as Niobe
- Henry Nakamura as Roy
- Nancy Kilgas as Aphrodite
- Dolores Starr as Calliope
- Jane Fischer as Medea
- Cecile Rogers as Ceres
- Kathleen Freeman as Miss Seely
- Steve Reeves as Ed Perkins
- Richard Sabre as Bill Nichols

== Songs ==
The film features several songs by Hugh Martin and Ralph Blane including

- "Athena" (Chorus)
- "The Girl Next Door" (Vic Damone), a slight variation on the 1944 hit "The Boy Next Door" from Meet Me in St Louis
- "Vocalize" (Jane Powell) which is reprised later in a choral arrangement as "Harmonize" (Jane Powell, Louis Calhern, Chorus)
- "Imagine" (Debbie Reynolds, Vic Damone)
- "Love can change the Stars" (Jane Powell, Sisters, Vic Damone)
- "Never felt better" (Debbie Reynolds, Jane Powell, Sisters)
- "Venezia" (Vic Damone)
- Donizetti's "Chacun le sait" from La fille du régiment (The Daughter of the Regiment) (Jane Powell)

=== Doublepack 7" track list Mercury EP-2-3284 ===
A1 Jane Powell: Vocalize
A2 Vic Damone: The Girl Next Door

B1 Debbie Reynolds: I Never Felt Better
B2 Jane Powell: Love Can Change The Stars

C1 Vic Damone: Love Can Change The Stars
C2 Vic Damone And Debbie Reynolds: Imagine

D1 Vic Damone: Venezia
D2 Jane Powell: Chacun Le Sait

== Production ==
The film was an original story. It was originally meant to star Elizabeth Taylor rather than Jane Powell. Esther Williams then became attached. In 1953 Williams left for maternity leave. Before her departure, she had assumed she would appear in Athena when she returned, as she claimed that she had helped create the premise with writers Leo Pogostin and Charles Walters.

MGM initially announced that Williams' appearance in Athena would be postponed to enable her to make another musical Bermuda for Joe Pasternak. However, the studio decided to cast Williams in Jupiter's Darling and replaced her with Jane Powell, who was taken off Love Me or Leave Me. They changed the main character from a swimmer to a singer, to accommodate Powell. Janet Leigh and Vera-Ellen were also cast in the film, but dropped out.

The male lead was given to Edmund Purdom who had become a leading man in The Student Prince (1954). MGM head of production Dore Schary was keen to build up Purdom as a star. Filming was pushed back so Purdom could replace Marlon Brando in The Egyptian.

Chiquita and Johnson from the Moulin Rouge were meant to appear in the film.

=== Filming ===
Director Dick Thorpe was less than enthusiastic about the picture. After a scene was finished, he would toss the pages of the script over his shoulder and walk away. In her autobiography, Jane Powell said that it really discouraged the cast. Powell also said that the film would have been better received had it been made twenty years later.

Edmund Purdom and Linda Christian had an affair during filming and later married.

In the song “Never felt better”, Minerva puts more value on health than wealth. She sings “I consider diamonds kind of square”. This is a reference to the comedy film Gentlemen Prefer Blondes which came out the year before. In that movie, the character played by Marilyn Monroe is obsessed with diamonds and wants to marry a rich man.

== Reception ==
=== Box office ===
According to MGM records the film made $1,222,000 in the US and Canada and $658,000 elsewhere resulting in a loss of $511,000.

=== Critical ===
Variety called it "a fairly pleasant tintuner entertainment most of the time."

=== Legacy ===
Steve Reeves' appearance in the film led to his casting in Hercules (1958). The 13-year-old daughter of that film's director, Pietro Francisci, saw Reeves in Athena and recommended him to her father. This was one of two films where Reeves' actual voice was heard; Jail Bait (1954) is the other. His European films were all dubbed by voice actors.
