= Giliw Ko =

1939 directed by Carlos Vander Tolosa

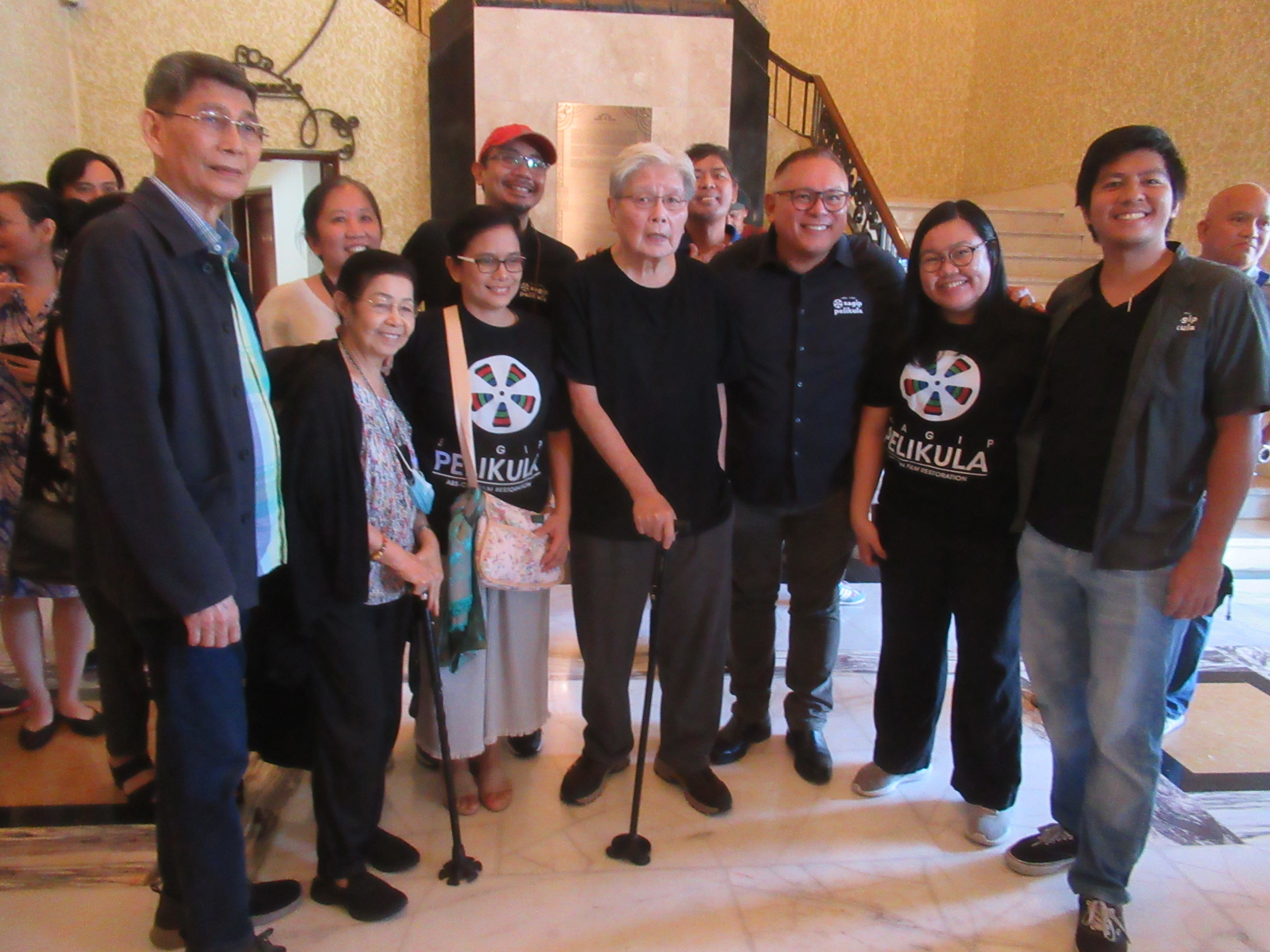
- Mike de Leon at the free screening
- Directed by: Carlos Vander Tolosa
- Written by: Carlos Vander Tolosa
- Produced by: Narcisa de León
- Starring: Ely Ramos; Fernando Poe; Mila del Sol; Fleur de Lis
- Cinematography: Benigio Young
- Edited by: Mario Rosales
- Music by: Juan Silos Jr. Ariston Avelino
- Color process: Black and white
- Production company: Carlos Vander Tolosa Production
- Distributed by: LVN Pictures
- Release date: July 29, 1939
- Running time: 91 minutes
- Country: Philippines
- Languages: Filipino; Tagalog

Giliw Ko (Filipino for "my love" or "my sweetheart") is a 1939 Filipino musical romance film. The first production of LVN Pictures, it established the production company's tradition of musical extravaganzas. Directed and written by Carlos Vander Tolosa, it stars Ely Ramos, Fernando Poe, Ely Ramos, Mila del Sol, and Fleur de Lis.

== Plot ==
Guia (Mila del Sol) is a provincial girl who becomes infatuated with images of Hollywood and the attention lavished on her by Antonio (Ely Ramos), the son of the wealthy landlord. Antonio is also the bandleader of a radio orchestra who convinces Guia to come to Manila with him and sing American songs on the radio. In Manila, Guia eventually becomes disillusioned, defies Antonio by singing in Tagalog, and returns back to the province and into the arms of her childhood sweetheart, Jose (Fernando Poe Sr.).

== Cast ==
- Ely Ramos as Antonio Lopez
- Fernando Poe as Jose
- Mila del Sol as Guia
- Fleur de Lis as Rosie
- Ben Rubio as Mang Takio
- Precioso Palma as Don Alvaro
- Cecilia Joaquin as Mang Juan
- Viva Ortega as Doña Lucia
- Nieves Obieta as Atang
- SSS Trio as themselves
- Kiko & Conde

== Production ==
Several scenes of the film were shot at the mansion of Narcisa de Leon, the producer and matriarch of LVN Pictures.

== Release ==
The film was released on July 29, 1939 at the Manila Metropolitan Theater. President Manuel L. Quezon was in attendance.

=== Restoration ===
In 1998, for the Philippines's centennial, the Australian government, through its National Film and Sound Archive, gifted the country with a restored copy of Giliw Ko. In 2022, ABS-CBN Film Restoration Project announced it was undergoing a new scan of the film print.

=== Restoration Notes for Giliw Ko ===
Giliw Ko is a 1939 musical drama that was scanned in 2K resolution using the existing 16mm print from LVN Pictures. stored at the ABS-CBN Film Archives. The film elements were in bad shape, with a deep state of vinegar syndrome, irreparable film tear, warps, and crystals. It took nearly 2 years to complete the scanning and enhancement combined because certain scenes had to be repeatedly rescanned frame by frame or at a very slow scan speed due to the image moving out of frame every time the irreparable film tears bump through the scanner’s sprockets. The enhancement of the picture took more than 500 hours to adjust the color and minimize impairments such as flicker, dirt, specks, shallow scratches, and watermarks; half of the total hours were used for the stabilization of the image due to the heavy shaking caused by the severe warps of the source material.

Due to the musical nature of the film, it took close to 2 months to restore the audio and address the ticks and pops, audio drop outs, and “wow” problems; the wobbling music with the deep unintelligible audio track was the most challenging part in the audio restoration process, given the limited resources available from 16mm print and Betacam tape. Another major challenge that was toughly addressed was the syncing of the audio to the enhanced picture due to the different frame rates of the available source materials.

The scanning and enhancement of the picture were completed at the ABS-CBN Film Archives while the audio restoration was done at Narra by Wildsound Studios in 2023.

== See also ==
- List of Philippine films before 1940
