= Evelyn Varden =

American actor

- Varden in the mid 1950s.
- Born: Mae Evelyn Hall; June 12, 1893; Adair, Oklahoma, U.S.
- Died: July 11, 1958 (aged 65); Manhattan, New York City, U.S.
- Occupations: Stage, film, television actress
- Years active: 1900s-1958
- Spouses: Charles Coleman (m. 1914; div. 1921); William J. Quinn (m. 1921)

Evelyn Varden (born Mae Evelyn Hall; June 12, 1893 – July 11, 1958) was an American character actress.

== Stage ==
Born in Adair, Oklahoma, Varden was Cherokee and is listed on the Dawes Rolls as 1/32nd Cherokee by Blood. She began her career as a teenager in the first decade of the 20th century, acting with her aunts in a troupe that toured the western United States. She was on Broadway by age sixteen in 1910. It was not until the 1930s and into her forties that her stage career took off in the theater, notably playing Mrs. Gibbs, the small town matron who dreams of Paris, in the original production of Our Town.

Varden's stage work mainly consisted of showy supporting roles although she did star in the ill-fated Return Engagement by Lawrence Riley. The 1950 melodrama Hilda Crane was a personal success for Varden although the play itself ran only two months. The following year she played the Nurse in a production of Romeo and Juliet starring Olivia de Havilland. Her final Broadway appearance in The Bad Seed was one of her acclaimed performances.

== Radio and television ==
Varden occasionally appeared on radio from the early 1940s and well into the 1950s. She starred in radio productions of Hay Fever, The Silver Cord, and The Glass Menagerie among several other programs. She would later appear in a number of television productions during the 1950s, including an adaptation of Cradle Song, opposite Judith Anderson.

== Film ==
Varden did not make her first film appearance until 1949 at age 56 with the film Pinky. She then went on to make over a dozen more films, including recreating her stage roles in the motion picture adaptations of Hilda Crane (1956) and The Bad Seed (1956).

Varden's best-known motion picture performance was as the gregarious storekeeper Icey Spoon in the 1955 film classic, The Night of the Hunter, based on the like-named novel. That performance garnered considerable acclaim, not least from the book's author, Davis Grubb. "Varden is almost my favorite person in the whole film. [...] I thought she was perfect as Icey Spoon. She put things into that characterization that she should have gotten extra for. [...] Because she got across the very subtle way of middle-aged women who are promoting the marriage of a younger woman to an attractive male, they themselves are very sexually excited by the whole thing. It's a sixty-year-old yenta's way of getting off. She did more with a little sigh..."

Varden's career was still going strong at the time of her death. Immediately prior to taking ill in January, Varden was appearing in London, earning kudos for her portrayal of an American mother in Lesley Storm's comedy, Roar Like a Dove. Just weeks before her death, that turn earned Varden the award for Best Supporting Performance (in a Play or Musical) for 1957/1958, as judged by drama critics of the National British press.

== Personal life ==
Varden was married twice: first to fellow thespian Charles Pearce Coleman, from 1914 until their divorce in 1921, and then, from 1921 until her death, to Baltimore-based hotel operator William J. Quinn.

== Death ==
Varden died on July 11, 1958, at Flower Fifth Avenue Hospital in Manhattan, New York City, at the age of 65.

== Filmography ==
- Pinky (1949) as Melba Wooley
- When Willie Comes Marching Home (1950) as Mrs. Gertrude Kluggs
- Cheaper by the Dozen (1950) as School Principal (uncredited)
- Stella (1950) as Flora Stella's mother
- Elopement (1951) as Millie Reagan
- Finders Keepers (1952) as Ma Kipps
- Phone Call from a Stranger (1952) as Sally Carr
- The Student Prince (1954) as Queen
- Athena (1954) as Grandma Salome Mulvain
- Désirée (1954) as Marie
- The Night of the Hunter (1955) as Icey Spoon
- Alfred Hitchcock Presents (1956) (Season 2 Episode 12: "The Rose Garden") as Cordelia Welles
- Hilda Crane (1956) as Mrs. Burns
- Cradle Song (1956 TV movie) as The Vicaress
- The Bad Seed (1956) as Monica Breedlove
- Ten Thousand Bedrooms (1957) as Countess Alzani (final film role)

== Broadway appearances ==
- The Nest Egg (November 22, 1910 – January 1911)
- Seven Days' Leave (January 17, 1918 – June 1918)
- Allegiance (August 1, 1918 – September 1918)
- The Honor of the Family (March 17, 1919 – May 1919)
- Alley Cat (September 17, 1934 – Sep 1934)
- A Woman of the Soil (March 25, 1935 – April 1935)
- Life's Too Short (September 20, 1935 – September 1935)
- Weep for the Virgins (November 30, 1935 – December 1935)
- Russet Mantle (January 16, 1936 – April 1936)
- Prelude to Exile (November 30, 1936 – January 1937)
- Now You've Done It (March 5, 1937 – April 1937)
- To Quito and Back (October 6, 1937 – December 1937)
- Our Town (February 4, 1938 – November 19, 1938)
- Family Portrait (March 8, 1939 – June 1939)
- Ladies and Gentlemen (October 17, 1939 – January 13, 1940)
- Grey Farm (May 3, 1940 – June 1, 1940)
- Return Engagement (November 1–7, 1940)
- The Lady Who Came to Stay (January 2–4, 1941)
- Candle in the Wind (October 22, 1941 – January 10, 1942)
- The Family (March 30, 1943 – April 3, 1943)
- Our Town (revival) (January 10–29, 1944)
- Dream Girl (December 14, 1945 – December 14, 1946)
- Present Laughter (October 29, 1946 – March 15, 1947)
- She Stoops to Conquer (December 28, 1949 – January 8, 1950)
- Hilda Crane (November 1, 1950 – December 31, 1950)
- Romeo and Juliet (March 10, 1951 – April 21, 1951)
- A Date With April (April 15–25, 1953)
- The Bad Seed (December 8, 1954 – September 27, 1955)
