= Genghis Khan (1950 film) =

- Theatrical release poster
- Directed by: Manuel Conde
- Screenplay by: Manuel Conde; Carlos V. Francisco
- Produced by: Manuel Conde
- Starring: Manuel Conde; Elvira Reyes; Inday Jalandoni; Jose Villafranca
- Cinematography: Emmanuel Rojas
- Edited by: Rex Heinze
- Music by: Juan Silos Jr.
- Distributed by: MC Productions
- Release dates: 1950 (Philippines); 1952 (Venice)
- Running time: 88 minutes
- Country: Philippines
- Language: Tagalog
- Budget: ₱125,000

Genghis Khan (or Ang Buhay ni Genghis Khan) is a 1950 Philippine epic historical drama film directed by Manuel Conde, based on the life of Mongol ruler and emperor Genghis Khan. It was the earliest film to depict the Khan's life. The film rights was sold to United Artists and was dubbed in 17 languages, earning $17 million worldwide.

Genghis Khan was given a technical achievement citation upon its debut at the 1952 Venice Film Festival. It also was shown at the 1952 Edinburgh Film Festival. Widely acclaimed by international critics for its technical innovation and remarkable storytelling within the medium, Genghis Khan makes Filipino history as the first film to be submitted as a sole entry of Honorary Foreign Language Film award at the 26th Academy Awards, despite no award was given to that film by the Academy Board of Governors, making it the only year to not have given that honorary category to any non-English-language films until the establishment as a competitive award. Considered the most ambitious and classic post-war film ever made and one of the greatest Philippine films.

== Plot ==
A film about the youth of Temujin, who later became Genghis Khan, who is brave, wise, sometimes cunning. He goes through difficult trials, fighting against competing tribes for land rights and struggling for hegemony in the steppe. Having fallen in love with the daughter of the leader of an enemy tribe and trying to restore his destroyed ulus. His actions lead to a great victory before he ascends the throne.

== Cast ==
- Manuel Conde as Temujin / Genghis Khan
- Elvira Reyes as Lei Hu
- Inday Jalandoni as Burchou
- Jose Villafranca
- Lou Salvador as Burchou
- Don Dano as Darmo Acosta
- Africa Dela Rosa
- Ric Bustamante
- Ely Nakpil
- Johnny Monteiro
- Andres Centenera
- Leon Lizares

== Production ==
Genghis Khan was directed by Manuel Conde and was produced under his own studio Manuel Conde (MC) Productions. The film had a limited budget and equipment used for production was outdated even at that time. Due to cost-cutting measures, Conde used calesa horses which had smaller built compared to horses used in Western films. The film was made in black and white and has a duration of 88 minutes.

Conde as Manuel Urbano also did the film's screenplay. Botong Francisco, who is better known for his murals, was also involved in Genghis Khan as its production designer. Other members of the production team include Emmanuel Rojas (cinematographer), Rex Heinze (editor), Flaviano Villareal (sound) and Juan Silos Jr. (music).

As seen in the original posters, Manuel Conde shares directional credit with Lou Salvador as a concession to the actor for agreeing to shave his head for his villain role as Burchou. Despite this, Conde assumes full creative control in directing the film and Salvador didn't have a single directional input towards the film. New re-releases of the film now remove Salvador's directional credit and only bear Conde's name in the posters.

== Release ==
Genghis Khan was released at the 1952 Venice Film Festival. United Artists bought the worldwide distribution rights to release the film in the following year, where it would later be dubbed in 16 languages, making it the first Philippine film to have bought the rights to worldwide distribution by major film studios in the United States.

== Reception ==
Genghis Khan was praised for its technical aspects although it was also found to be too graphic and violent by critics of that time. Conde was praised for being "authentic" by devising small-built horses which was believed to be closer to the actual breed of horses used by Genghis Khan which is now extinct.

=== Accolades ===
Genghis Khan won the Filipinos Pearl of the Orient Award as Most Popular Motion Picture in the Philippine Movie Popularity Poll of 1952-53 sponsored by the Philippines Herald newspaper.

== See also ==
- List of Asian historical drama films
