= Vicente Madrigal National High School =

Public high school in Rizal, Philippines

Vicente Madrigal Integrated School
- Mataas na Paaralang Nasyonal ng Vicente Madrigal
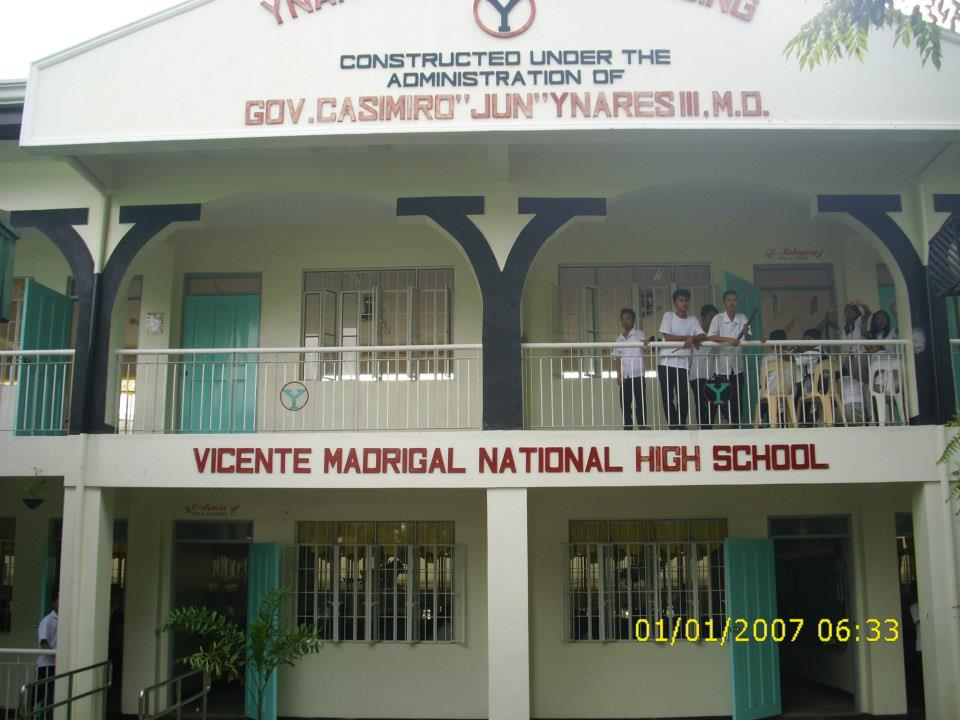

Location
- Brgy. Palangoy, Binangonan, Rizal; Philippines; 14°30′24″N 121°11′13″E

Information
- Type: Science-Oriented Public High School (2010 SEC, 2002 RBEC, SSC)
- Motto: Ang saya saya sa Madrigal
- Established: 1992 as Municipal High School (1995, proclaimed National High School through National Legislation)
- Principal: Michael A. Garrovillas
- Grades: 7 to 12
- Enrollment: 4,500+
- Colors: Blue and White
- Nickname: VMIS
- Website: www.vicentemadrigal.com

Vicente Madrigal National High School is a public high school in Binangonan, Rizal, Philippines.

It was established in 1992 as Vicente Madrigal Municipal High School, but in the virtue of the Republic Act No. 8010 it was converted to a National High School on May 25, 1995. It was named after the late Senator Vicente Madrigal. On 2012, the school has 2,800+ registered students. Absalon C. Fernandez is the Secondary School Principal II.

== Facilities ==
The VMNHS has 9 two-storey buildings and 2 single-storey building. It includes a library, an Audio-Visual Room (AVR), Science Laboratory, Computer Lab, School Clinic, Garments Laboratory, Home Economics Room and a School Cooperative. The school also includes a covered court, a gymnasium and four school canteens.

== Class schedule ==
The Class Schedule is:

Grade 7 and 10 is 6:30AM to 12:10PM

Grade 8 and 9 is 12:30PM to 6:40PM

== Curricula ==
The school uses two curricula, the RBEC Curriculum (for RBEC students) and the K–12 curriculum (for the K–12 students), both using the zero-based grading system for each period.

=== K–12 program ===
The implementation of the K–12 program is "phased". The first phase of the implementation will start on SY 2012–2013. During this school year, universal kindergarten will be finally offered, and will now be a part of the compulsory education system; and a new curriculum for Grade 1 and Grade 7 students would be introduced. By SY 2016–2017, Grade 11/Year 5 will be introduced, and Grade 12/Year 6 by SY 2017–2018; with the phased implementation of the new curriculum finished by the SY 2017–2018. Students in 2nd year to 4th year high school this SY 2012–2013 are not included in the program. It is only applicable to students from Kinder to 1st year high school which is now called Grade 7.

== Conversion into a National High School ==
By the virtue of the Republic Act No. 8010. Vicente Madrigal Municipal High School was converted into a National High School and lapsed into law on May 25, 1995.

== Gallery ==
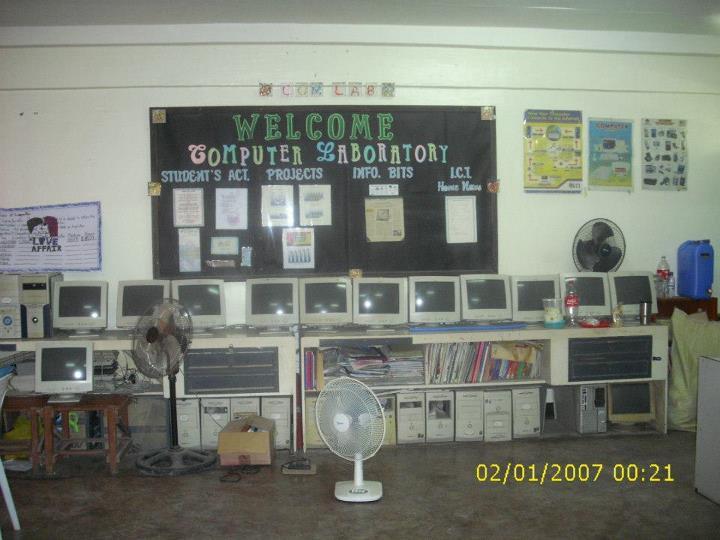
VMNHS Computer Laboratory

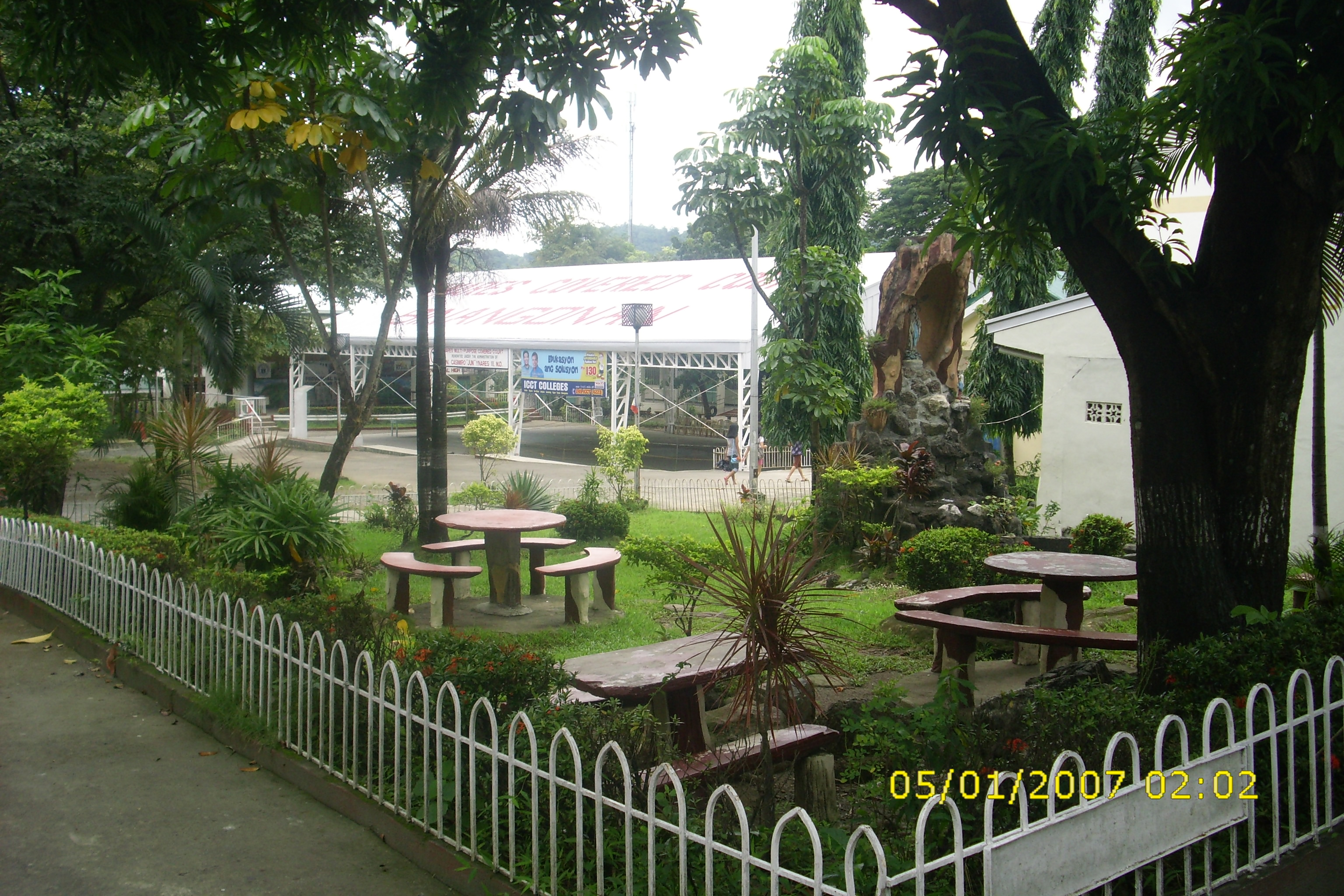
VMNHS Grotto

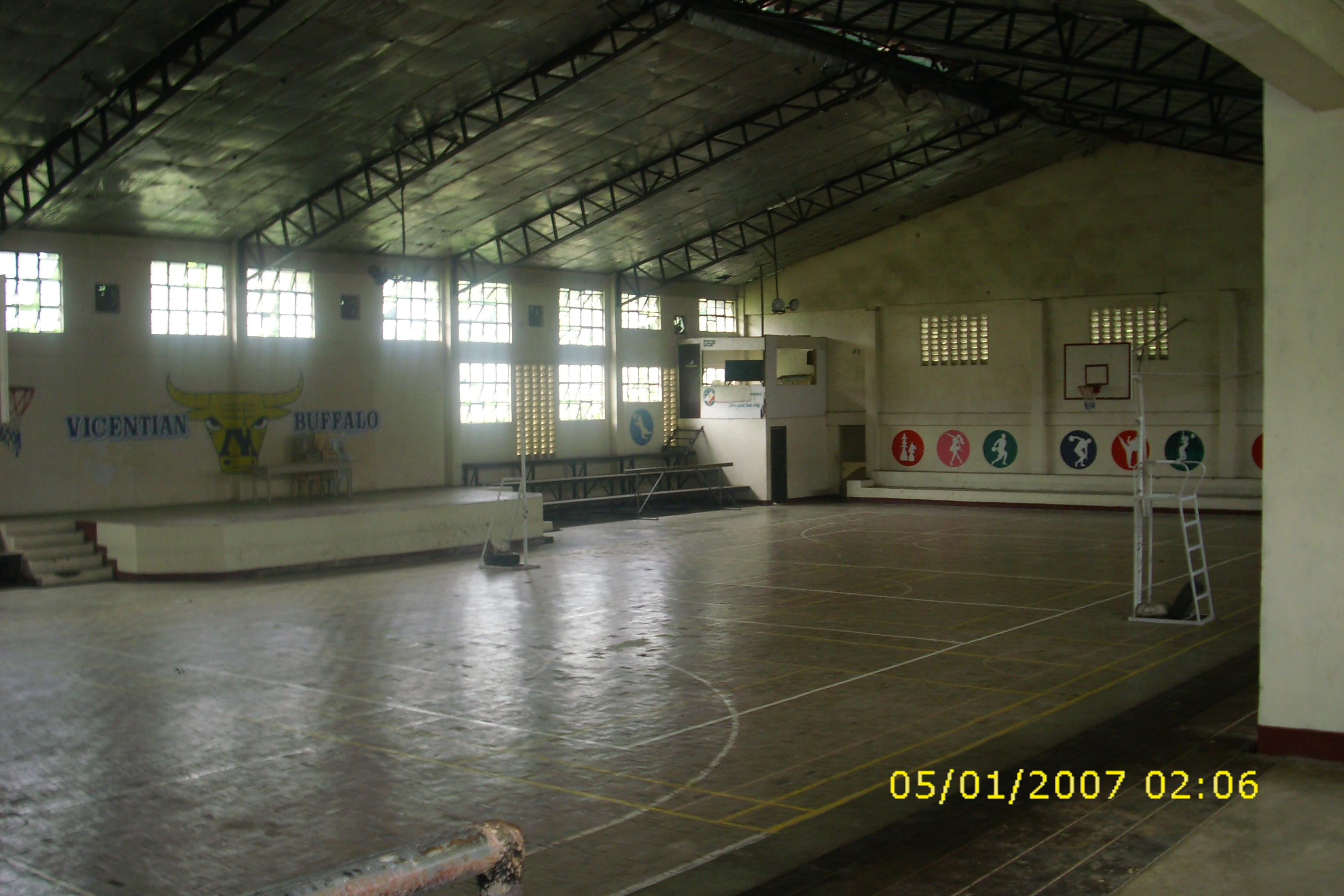
VMNHS Gymnasium

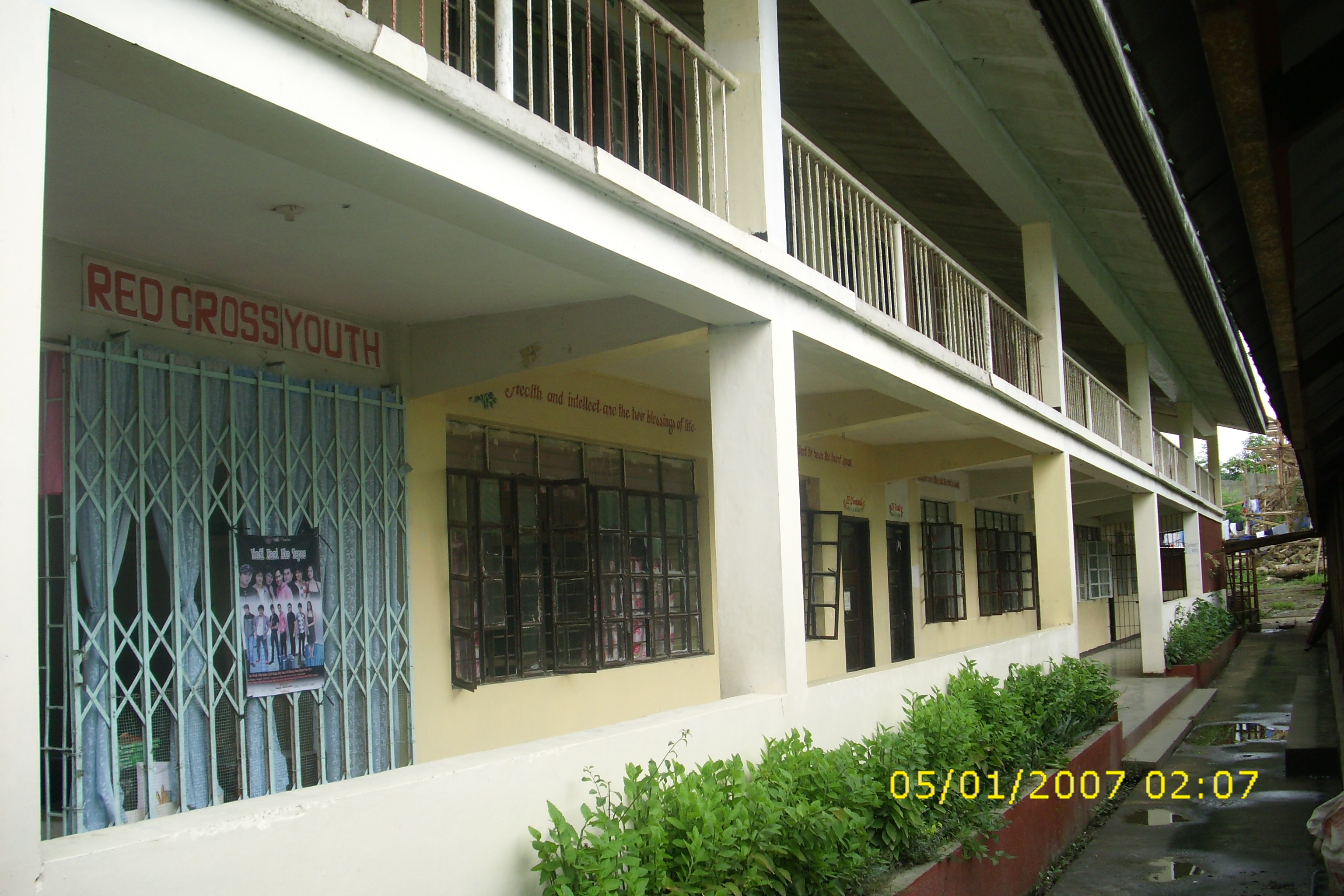
VMNHS Maceda II Building

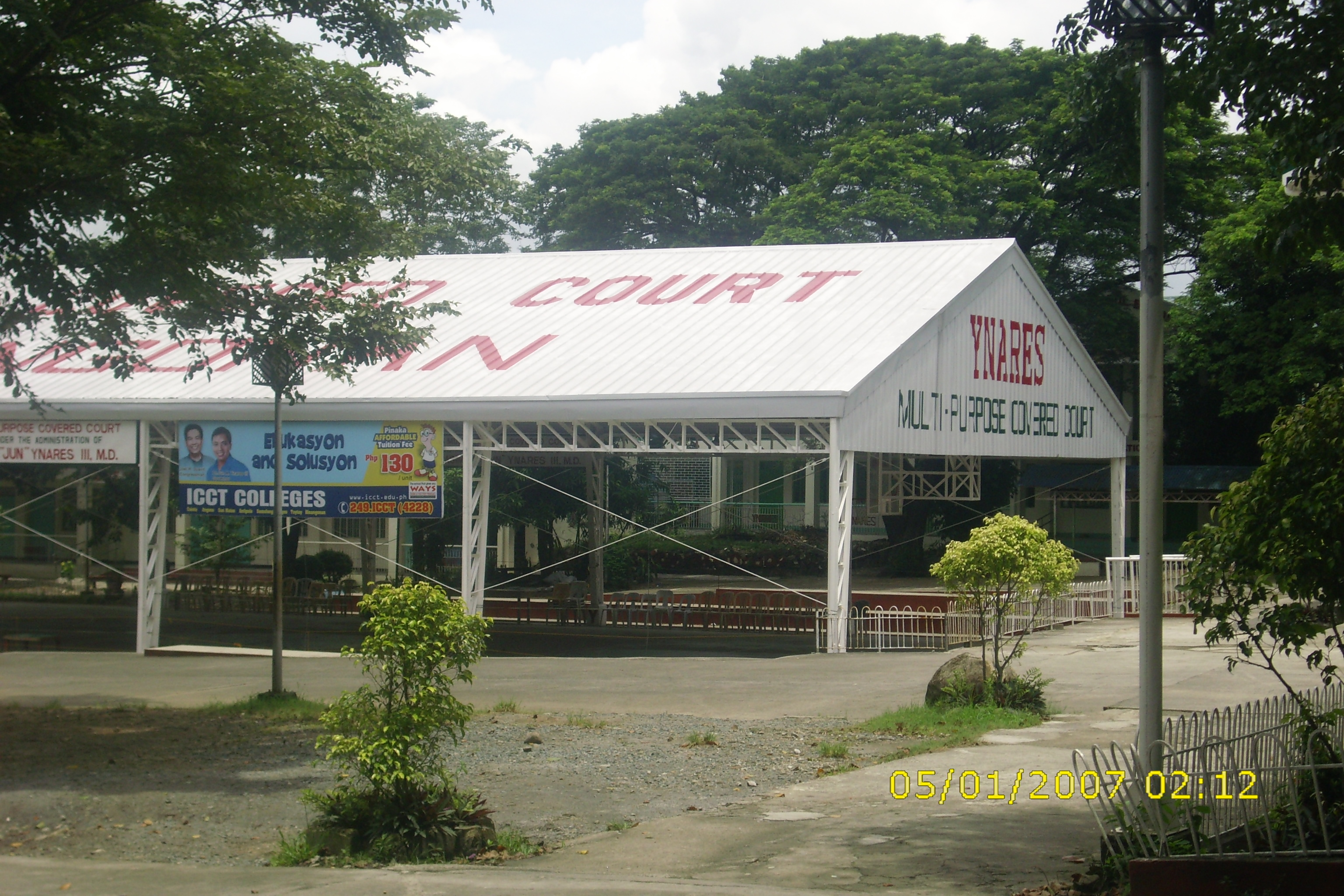
VMNHS Ynares Covered Court

== See also ==
- Binangonan, Rizal
- Rizal
- Vicente Madrigal
- Guronasyon Foundation National High School
