= Phone Call from a Stranger =

1952 film by Jean Negulesco

- Theatrical release poster
- Directed by: Jean Negulesco
- Screenplay by: Nunnally Johnson
- Based on: a story by I. A. R. Wylie
- Produced by: Nunnally Johnson
- Starring: Shelley Winters; Gary Merrill; Michael Rennie; Keenan Wynn; Evelyn Varden; Bette Davis
- Cinematography: Milton Krasner A.S.C.
- Edited by: Hugh Fowler
- Music by: Franz Waxman
- Production company: Twentieth Century-Fox
- Distributed by: Twentieth Century-Fox
- Release date: February 15, 1952
- Running time: 96 minutes
- Country: United States
- Language: English
- Box office: $1,350,000 (US rentals)

Phone Call from a Stranger is a 1952 American film noir drama directed by Jean Negulesco from a screenplay by Nunnally Johnson, based on the 1950 novelette of the same name by I. A. R. Wylie. The film centers on the survivor of an aircraft crash who contacts the relatives of three of the victims he came to know on board the flight. The story employs flashbacks to relive the three characters' pasts.

At the 13th Venice International Film Festival, the film earned Negulesco a nomination for the Golden Lion, while Johnson was nominated for the Golden Osella for Best Original Screenplay.

== Plot ==
After his wife Jane (Helen Westcott) admits to an extramarital affair, Iowa attorney David Trask (Gary Merrill) abandons her and their daughters and heads for Los Angeles. His flight is delayed, and while waiting in the airport restaurant he meets a few of his fellow passengers. Troubled alcoholic Dr. Robert Fortness (Michael Rennie), haunted by his responsibility for a car accident in which a colleague, Dr. Tim Brooks (Hugh Beaumont), was killed, is returning home to his wife Claire (Beatrice Straight) and teenage son Jerry (Ted Donaldson), and plans to tell the district attorney the truth about the accident.

Aspiring actress Binky Gay (Shelley Winters) is hoping to free her husband Mike Carr (Craig Stevens) from the clutches of his domineering mother, former vaudevillian Sally Carr (Evelyn Varden), who looks down on Binky. Boisterous traveling salesman Eddie Hoke (Keenan Wynn), who is always ready with a bad joke or a silly idea, shares a photograph of his young, attractive wife Marie (Bette Davis) wearing a swimsuit. When a storm forces the aircraft (Douglas DC-3) to land en route, they continue to share their life stories during the unexpected four-hour layover. They exchange home phone numbers with the idea that they may one day have a reunion.

Upon resuming their journey, the aircraft crashes and Trask is one of only three survivors; the other eighteen passengers and crew are killed, including Trask's three acquaintances. Trask contacts their families by phone and invites himself to their homes.

Claire confides that Jerry has run off because he blames her for his father's frequent absences and drinking. Trask finds the young man and convinces him to return home, even for a short while, to hear what he has to say about his father. Claire objects to Jerry learning the truth about the car accident and about how she went along with a lie to protect both her husband and her son, but when Trask explains Fortness's deep sense of guilt and his determination to right the wrong he had committed, Jerry has a change of attitude.

Hoping to change Sally's opinion of her late daughter-in-law, he tells her Binky had been cast as Mary Martin's replacement in South Pacific on Broadway and had recommended Sally for a role. Mike thanks Trask for giving Binky "such a beautiful success. The kind she always dreamed about, but never could have".

Trask's final visit is to Marie; he discovers she is not the beautiful girl of Eddie's photograph, but an invalid paralyzed from the waist down. Marie reveals that early in her marriage she had left Eddie, whom she found to be vulgar and tiresome, for another man, Marty Nelson (Warren Stevens). The two planned to drive to Chicago, stopping here and there and enjoying their new freedom together. During one such stopover at a lake, however, Marie hit her head on the underside of a dock while swimming and received her paralyzing injury. Marty initially saved her life, but when he found out she would be paralyzed, he abandoned her. While Marie was in the hospital, confined to an iron lung and feeling hopeless, Eddie, completely forgiving her and saying, "Hiya, beautiful," came to take her home. Marie tells Trask that despite his often obnoxious behavior, Eddie was the most decent man she had ever known, and had taught her the true meaning of love.

Marie's story teaches Trask a lesson about marital infidelity and true reconciliation; he calls Jane to tell her he is returning home.

== Cast ==
- Shelley Winters as Binky Gay/Bianca Carr
- Gary Merrill as David Trask
- Michael Rennie as Dr. Robert Fortness
- Keenan Wynn as Eddie Hoke
- Evelyn Varden as Sally Carr
- Warren Stevens as Marty Nelson
- Beatrice Straight as Claire Fortness
- Ted Donaldson as Jerry Fortness
- Craig Stevens as Mike Carr
- Helen Westcott as Jane Trask
- Bette Davis as Marie Hoke

Uncredited

- Hugh Beaumont as Dr. Tim Brooks
- John Doucette as Arthur
- Tom Powers as Dr. Fernwood
- George Nader as Pilot
- Ken Christy as pier watchman
- Davis Roberts as Henry, employee at Carr nightclub

== Production ==
When Gary Merrill's wife Bette Davis read the script, she suggested he ask director Negulesco if she could play the relatively small role of Marie Hoke, feeling "it would be a change of pace for me. I believed in the part more than its length. I have never understood why stars should object to playing smaller parts if they were good ones. Marie Hoke was such a part."

Phone Call from a Stranger was the third on-screen pairing of Merrill and Davis, following All About Eve (1950) and Another Man's Poison (1951).

Producer-screenwriter Johnson originally wanted to cast Lauren Bacall as Binky Gay, but she was unavailable.

Broadway actress Beatrice Straight made her screen debut in this film.

Footage from Phone Call from a Stranger featuring Merrill and Davis was integrated with new material performed by Merrill and Jesse White as Eddie Hoke in Crack Up, an hour-long television adaptation broadcast on the CBS anthology series The 20th Century Fox Hour in February 1956.

== Critical reception ==
In his review for The New York Times, Bosley Crowther said, "So slick, indeed, is the whole thing—so smooth and efficiently contrived to fit and run with the precision of a beautifully made machine—that it very soon gives the impression of being wholly mechanical, picked up from a story-teller's blueprints rather than from the scroll of life ... that is the nature of the picture — mechanically intriguing but unreal."

Time Out called it "a decent, but hardly outstanding dramatic compendium."

== Radio adaptation ==
Merrill and Winters reprised their roles for a Lux Radio Theatre presentation of the story on January 5, 1953.
