= Sawing Gantimpala =

- Directed by: Manuel Conde
- Written by: Susana C. de Guzman (screenplay)
- Release date: 1940
- Country: Philippines
- Languages: Filipino, Tagalog

Sawing Gantimpala is a 1940 Filipino film directed by Manuel Conde. It stars Ely Ramos, Mila del Sol and Dina Valle.
