= Finders Keepers (1952 film) =

1952 American comedy film

- Theatrical release poster
- Directed by: Fred de Cordova
- Screenplay by: Richard Morris
- Story by: Richard Morris
- Produced by: Leonard Goldstein
- Starring: Tom Ewell; Julie Adams; Evelyn Varden; Dusty Henley; Harold Vermilyea; Douglas Fowley
- Cinematography: Carl E. Guthrie
- Edited by: Milton Carruth
- Music by: Hans J. Salter
- Production company: Universal-International Pictures
- Distributed by: Universal-International Pictures
- Release date: December 13, 1951 (Los Angeles)
- Running time: 74 minutes
- Country: United States
- Language: English

Finders Keepers is a 1952 American comedy film directed by Fred de Cordova, written by Richard Morris and starring Tom Ewell, Julie Adams, Evelyn Varden and Dusty Henley. The film was released on December 13, 1951 by Universal-International Pictures.

== Cast ==
- Tom Ewell as Tiger Kipps
- Julie Adams as Sue Kipps
- Evelyn Varden as Ma Kipps
- Dusty Henley as Tiger Kipps Jr.
- Harold Vermilyea as Mr. Fizpatrick
- Douglas Fowley as Frankie Simmons
- Richard Reeves as Joey
- Jack Elam as Eddie
- Herbert Anderson as Hotel Clerk
