= Narcisa de León =

Filipino film producer (1877–1966)

Narcisa Buencamino vda. de León
- Born: Narcisa Buencamino y Lim; October 29, 1877; San Miguel, Bulacan, Captaincy General of the Philippines
- Died: February 6, 1966 (aged 88); Quezon City, Philippines
- Resting place: Manila North Cemetery
- Other name: Doña Sisang
- Occupations: film producer & entrepreneur
- Years active: 1938–1966
- Spouse: José de León y Santiago-Mossesgeld (1904–1934)
- Relatives: Mike de Leon (Grandson)

Narcisa Buencamino vda. de León (October 29, 1877– February 6, 1966) was a Filipino film producer and businesswoman.

Clad daily in the rural dress of the camisón, saya and chinelas, Doña Sisang, as she was widely known, was already a 61-year-old widow when she entered the film industry. She chartered her family-owned LVN Pictures into a dominant position in post-World War II Philippine cinema. In addition, she was one of the most highly regarded Filipino businesswomen of the first half of the 20th century.

Her grandson, Mike de Leon, emerged as a highly acclaimed film director beginning in the 1970s. His 1977 film Kung Mangarap Ka't Magising was dedicated to his late grandmother on the occasion of her birth centenary.

In the 1930s was the growth of Philippine cinema, and the new production studios started by her. In the nearby Hacienda Hemady, the Sampaguita Pictures Studio set up shop, while along Justice Pedro Tiangco Tuazon Boulevard in Cubao the LVN Pictures Studio opened in 1936. The studio was named using the initials of the founding families of De Leon, Villonco and Navoa, and continued to operate up to 2005. Now what is left of this historic film studio is a commemorative fountain, dedicated to her as the LVN studio's co-founder and chairperson; it has been transferred to the Quezon Memorial Circle’s Quezon City Experience Museum in 2017.

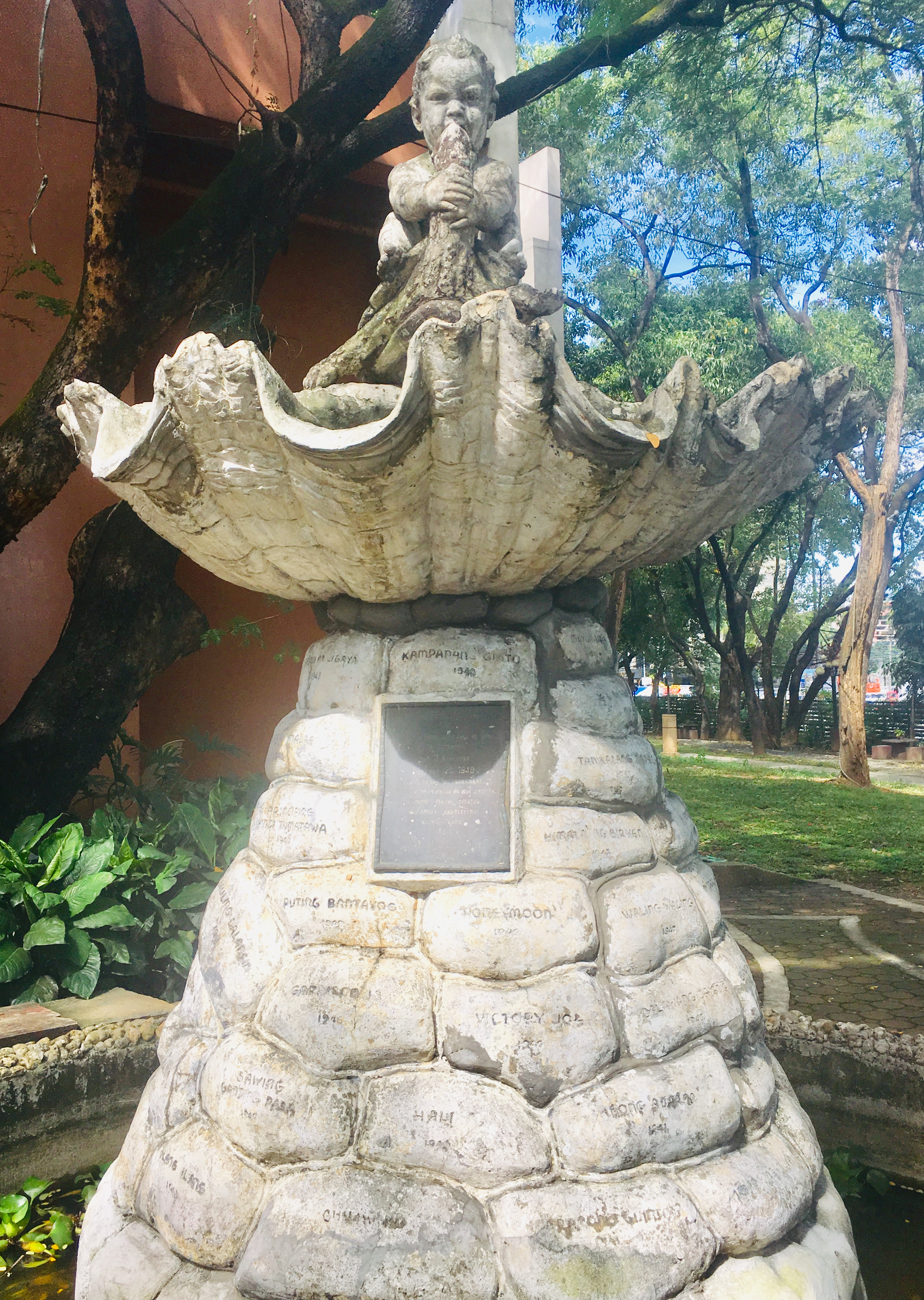
Commemorative fountain dedicated to Doña Narcisa Buencamino-De Leon located in Quezon Memorial Circle, Quezon City

== Early life ==
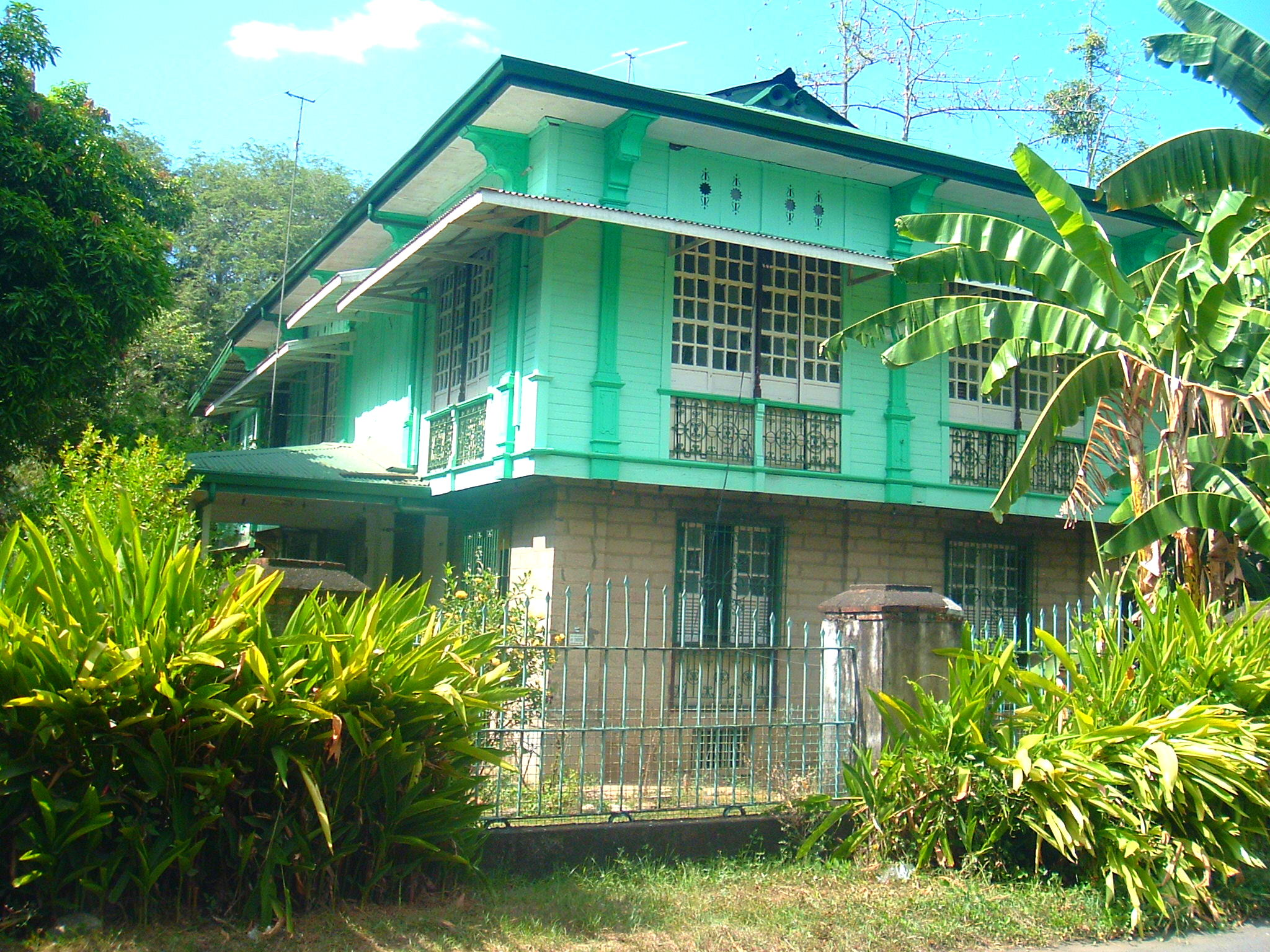
Family home of Doña Sisang in San Miguel, Bulacan

She was born Narcisa Buencamino in San Miguel, Bulacan at October 29, 1877. Her mother was Atanacia Lim y Lim, the daughter Chinese merchants; her father, Justo Buencamino y Sio-jo, was a Philippine Chinese poet who died when she was five. She was forced to stop schooling after the fourth grade to work with her mother in managing rice lands. In her teens, she was working odd jobs as a cook and a seamstress, and she would eventually enter the business of making umbrellas.

In 1904, she married José de León y Santiago-Mossesgeld, a local government official in San Miguel, with whom she would have five children; the family settled in San Miguel, Bulacan.

== Businesswoman ==
The couple ventured into the rice production business, and soon would be recognized as among the leading rice producers in Luzon. By the 1920s, the couple would own several high-valued real properties in Bulacan, Manila, and other prime locations within Luzon. They also engaged in philanthropic activities and donated a hospital to their hometown of San Miguel.

Widowed in 1934, she moved her family to Manila, took charge of the family business, and refocused it towards real estate. It was said that the business soared to new heights when she took full control after her husband's death.

She became the first woman appointed to the board of directors of a government corporation when she was named by President Manuel Quezon to the board of the National Rice and Corn Corporation. In the 1950s, she was among the organizing shareholders of Republic Cement Corporation, which soon became among the leading cement producers in the country.

Filipino film industry. She agreed, and in 1938, her family, along with the Villonco and Novoa families, contributed capital to establish a film studio. The company was named LVN Pictures. The name taken from the respective initials of the three founding families.

Apart from de Leon, the two other principal founding partners of LVN Pictures were Carmen Villonco y Suárez and Eleuterio Novoa Sr.

LVN broke into the Philippine film industry with the successful release of its first feature, Carlos Vander Tolosa's musical Giliw Ko, released in 1939. She was elected president of LVN Pictures in 1940; she eventually bought out the shares of her other partners, gaining full control over the studio. Giliw Ko was followed with another successful film, Manuel Conde's Ibong Adarna (1941), which featured the first color sequence in a Filipino film and was the first local film to earn more than a million pesos.

However, LVN Pictures was forced to close shop upon the Japanese invasion of the Philippines in December 1941. It resumed operations after the Liberation of Manila in 1945, and produced the first post-war Filipino movie, Orasang Ginto (1946). In 1949, LVN produced the first full-color Filipino feature film, Batalyon XIII; dissatisfied by the color-processing of that film, De León bought her own color laboratory for LVN.

LVN Pictures saw the peak of its success in the decade following the war, hosting a stable of the most prominent film stars who had joined its studios such as Rogelio de la Rosa. In addition to producing commercially successful films, LVN also featured critically acclaimed prestige films such as Lamberto Avellana's Anak Dalita (1956), which was named Best Film at the 1956 Asia-Pacific Film Festival.

In the late 1950s, LVN capitalized on the unexpected stardom of one of its contract players, the singer Diomedes Maturán who emerged as the top box-office draw of 1958–59.

=== Thematic influence on LVN films ===
During her years at the helm of LVN Pictures, she retained absolute control over the operations of the studio and of the films it produced. She personally read and approved the final scripts prior to production, later with the assistance of her son Manuel starting in 1948.

Her personal tastes dictated the themes of LVN films. Reflecting her upbringing and age, she was partial to rural romances and stories based on the traditional forms of awit and corrido, and populated her movies with Philippine folk dances; she resisted copying Hollywood trends and insisted on injecting Filipino culture into LVN films.

Devoutly Catholic, she demanded that each of LVN's films contain a moral lesson; she disallowed sex scenes and permitted only love scenes that featured no more than a peck on the cheek.

Her idiosyncrasies aside, de Leon used the phrase "Kung ano ang kikita" ("Whatever makes money") to justify the choices of scripts LVN adapted into film. As a result, she resisted making "prestige films" that delved into socially conscious issues. She was hesitant to produce Lamberto Avellana's bleak drama Anak Dalita, and only did so at the insistence of her son, Manuel. The film earned poorly at the box office but received several international awards; these did not impress her. She told her son, "Ano ngayon ang gagawin ninyo sa mga kopang iyan? Makakain ninyo ba iyan?" ("What will you do with all those trophies? Can you be fed with those?")

=== Star maker ===
Mila del Sol rose to stardom after being cast by Doña Sisang in Giliw Ko, LVN Pictures' first production

De León was known for her acumen in selecting and cultivating stars; this was manifested early on in the casting of the very first LVN film, Giliw Ko. She was instrumental in the casting of the then-unknown Mila del Sol in a romantic leading role, over the objection of director Vander Tolosa who felt that the 12-year-old actress was too young for the part. Del Sol would be but the first of many Filipino actors whom de Leon would "discover" and groom for stardom. Among the other discoveries of de Leon and LVN Pictures were Charito Solis, Nida Blanca, Armando Goyena, Luz Valdez, Delia Razon, and Mario Montenegro; Razon and Montenegro were signed by LVN after De Leon espied them in bit roles in other films.

De León was a disciplinarian who maintained a strict supervision over the behavior of her stars, restraining their spending habits by withholding portions of their salaries until their withheld pay was sufficient to buy a new house or car. She would periodically hand out cash advances to LVN actresses so they could purchase new gowns.

She would often involve herself into the personal lives of her stars, engineering for example, the reconciliation between Nestor de Villa and his father, from whom he had become estranged after he disapproved of his becoming an actor. She frequently invited many of her actors to her Quezon City home along Broadway Street. De León was also willing to help in manually sewing the costumes of her actresses.

In line with her frugal nature, she was hesitant to spend on publicity for LVN films. Instead, she would develop "love team" tandems among her stars, such as Nestor de Villa and Nida Blanca, and encourage them to "Magpa-chismis kayo." ("Make gossip for yourselves.")

== Lifestyle ==
De León was known for her extreme humility. She favored her simple rural attire even when attending the most lavish receptions, and would immediately deflect any praises directed at her. She insisted on using an old diesel-powered Mercedes-Benz W191 even after it had fallen out of fashion and in disrepair. De León also continued her philanthropic activities, providing for a school building to her native San Miguel, contributing to the renovation of the San Miguel Church, and even donating parcels of land in Bulacan and Cabanatuan to the needy.

Despite her financial success, de Leon had an inchoate awareness of the English and Hokkien languages; however, she was eloquent in Spanish and of course her native Tagalog.

== Later years and death ==
Despite the box-office success of the films of LVN Pictures in the 1940s and 1950s, it was unable to sustain financial liquidity, and by 1961, it stopped producing movies and redirected its operations for post-production services. Despite being in her eighties, De León continued on as a film producer with Dalisay Pictures, an independent production outfit. She likewise attended to her other businesses and was active until the week before her death at age 88 in 1966. She was buried at the Manila North Cemetery.
