= Howard Wendell =

American actor (1908–1975)

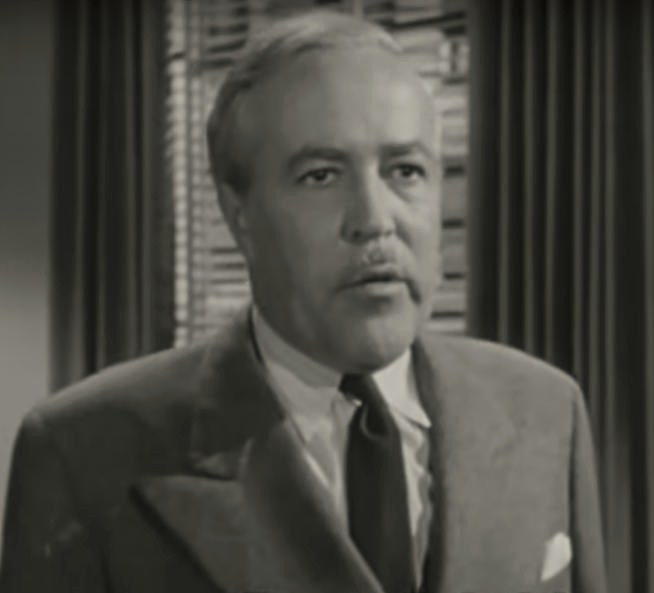
- Wendell in The Big Heat (1953)
- Born: Howard David Wendell; January 2, 1908; Johnstown, Pennsylvania, U.S.
- Died: August 11, 1975 (aged 67); Oregon City, Oregon, U.S.
- Education: Ohio University, Cleveland Play House
- Occupation: Actor
- Years active: 1951–1971

Howard David Wendell (January 2, 1908 – August 11, 1975) was an American actor.

== Early life and career ==
A native of Johnstown, Pennsylvania, Wendell was one of two sons born to Irwin Wendell and Clara Heal. By 1913, the family had relocated to Elyria, Ohio, where his father found regular employment at Parsch Lumber and Coal Company, first as a truck driver and later as the foreman at the lumber yard. Wendell attended Ohio University and later apprenticed at the Cleveland Playhouse.

Wendell's Broadway credits include Make a Wish (1951), The Curious Savage (1950), Arms and the Man (1950), The Show Off (1950), and The Great Campaign (1947). He acted in the Santa Barbara Summer Theatre and in theaters in Hollywood, Phoenix, La Jolla, and San Francisco. He received a gold cup in recognition of being named as the actor with the best performance in 1946 at the Newport Casino Theatre in Rhode Island.

Between 1949 and 1970, Wendell made a number of film appearances but worked mostly on TV, in such programs as Dragnet, Perry Mason, Wagon Train, Gunsmoke, The Texan (S1E13), Bonanza, Batman (season 1, episodes 3 and 4), The Munsters, The Adventures of Ozzie & Harriet, Leave it to Beaver, The Dick Van Dyke Show, Hazel, and The Big Valley. His final appearance was in Adam-12.

== Personal life and death ==
From September 13, 1937, until their divorce in January 1968, Wendell was married to Harriet Morley, whom he had met while apprenticing at the Cleveland Play House, where she was employed as a costumer. The union produced three sons and one daughter.

On August 11, 1975, at age 67, Wendell died of undisclosed causes at his home in Oregon City, survived by his wife, children and brother.

== Filmography ==
Year	Title	Role	Notes
1952	You for Me	Oliver Wherry	
1952	Affair in Trinidad	Anderson	
1953	By the Light of the Silvery Moon	John H. Harris	
1953	Gentlemen Prefer Blondes	Watson	
1953	The Big Heat	Commissioner Higgins	
1953	Captain Scarface	Mr. Dilts	
1954	Prince Valiant	Morgan Todd	
1954	The Black Dakotas	Judge Horatio Baker	
1954	Athena	Mr. Grenville	
1955	Wiretapper	Prison Chaplain	
1955	The View from Pompey's Head	John Duncan	
1955	The Fighting Chance	Lucky Jim Morrison	
1956	Never Say Goodbye	Harry	
1956	A Day of Fury	Vanryzin	
1956	Storm Center	Sen. Bascomb	
1958	Mardi Gras	Howard Hansen	Uncredited
1959	The Remarkable Mr. Pennypacker	Sexton	Uncredited
1959	Stranger in My Arms	Congressman	
1959	It Happened to Jane	Purchasing	Uncredited
1959	The Four Skulls of Jonathan Drake	Dr. George Bradford	
1961	The Big Bankroll	Mr. Simmons	Uncredited
1961	Sail a Crooked Ship	Mr. Caldingham	Uncredited
1963	The Alfred Hitchcock Hour	General Practitioner	Season 1 Episode 22: "Diagnosis: Danger"
1964	The Alfred Hitchcock Hour	Mr. Flagstone	Season 2 Episode 23: "A Matter of Murder"
1964	Where Love Has Gone	Mr. Carruthers	Uncredited
1965	How to Murder Your Wife	The Trial Judge	
1965	My Blood Runs Cold	Mayor	
1965	Mirage	Bar Patron	Uncredited
1965	The Cincinnati Kid	Charlie	Uncredited
1966	Frankie and Johnny	Man at Table	Uncredited
1971	The Million Dollar Duck	Roger - State Dept. Representative	Uncredited, (final film role)
