= The Fighting Chance (1955 film) =

1955 film by William Witney

- Theatrical release poster
- Directed by: William Witney
- Screenplay by: Houston Branch
- Story by: Robert Blees
- Produced by: William J. O'Sullivan
- Starring: Rod Cameron; Julie London; Ben Cooper; Taylor Holmes; Howard Wendell; Mel Welles
- Cinematography: Bud Thackery
- Edited by: Irving M. Schoenberg
- Production company: Republic Pictures
- Distributed by: Republic Pictures
- Release date: December 15, 1955
- Running time: 70 minutes
- Country: United States
- Language: English

The Fighting Chance is a 1955 American drama film directed by William Witney and written by Houston Branch. The film stars Rod Cameron, Julie London, Ben Cooper, Taylor Holmes, Howard Wendell and Mel Welles. The film was released on December 15, 1955, by Republic Pictures.

== Plot ==
After a dispute over money, trainer Bill Binyon and a young jockey, Mike Gargan, quit working for Thoroughbred owner Al Moreno, whose girlfriend Janet Wales leaves him as well.

Bill and Mike go to California, where they are employed by "Lucky Jim" Morrison's stable. A flirtatious Janet turns up and draws interest from both men. In addition to this, Mike is infatuated with Miss Ellen, a filly who he believes could become a champion racehorse.

Janet turns out to be a devious, scheming woman who attempts to make both men jealous. After she declines Mike's marriage proposal, he goes to Mexico, where he gambles, drinks and neglects his career. After this, Bill takes a chance by marrying Janet. However, her lavish spending habits leaves them bickering and broke.

Morrison passes away due to a heart attack which results in Miss Ellen going to an auction. Mike returns and outbids Bill for the filly. He then reluctantly accepts a loan and a partnership when Bill lends him enough money to make the purchase. With a race coming up that offers a $400,000 prize, despite the horse being in imperfect health, Janet persuades Bill and Mike to enter Miss Ellen in the race since she really wants the money.

In the saddle, Mike has to ease up when the horse begins to bleed, and Miss Ellen finishes second. A furious Janet derides both men as losers, announcing she and Bill are through. Unknown to Janet, Bill bet on their horse across the board (win, place and show). He throws $40,000 worth of tickets in Janet's face. When she picks them up, he hits Janet with the horse's whip. On this note, Bill and Mike walk away, resuming their partnership and friendship.

== Cast ==
- Rod Cameron as Bill Binyon
- Julie London as Janet Wales
- Ben Cooper as Mike Gargan
- Taylor Holmes as Railbird
- Howard Wendell as Lucky Jim Morrison
- Mel Welles as Al Moreno
- Bob Steele as Curly
- Paul Birch as The Auctioneer
- Carl Milletaire as Joe
- Rodolfo Hoyos Jr. as Rico
- John Damler as McKeen
- Sam Scar as Proprietor

== See also ==
- List of films about horse racing
