= Mila del Sol =

Filipino actress (1923–2020)

- Del Sol in 1965
- Born: Clarita Villarba Rivera; May 12, 1923; Tondo, Manila, Insular Government of the Philippine Islands
- Died: November 10, 2020 (aged 97); Parañaque, Philippines
- Occupations: Actress; Entrepreneur; Philanthropist
- Years active: 1937–2010
- Relatives: Gustavo Tambunting (grandson); Onemig Bondoc (grandnephew); Ira Cruz (grandson); Ignacio Bunye (nephew)

Mila del Sol (born Clarita Villarba Rivera; 12 May 1923 – 10 November 2020) was a Filipino actress and entrepreneur. She began her career in the late 1930s and became one of the biggest box office draws of the 1940s, noted for her performances in Giliw Ko (1939), Prinsesa ng Kumintang (1940), Sawing Gantimpala (1940), Ararong Ginto (1941), Villa Hermosa (1941), Ibong Adarna (1941), and Rosa Linda (1941). She appeared in fewer film and television productions from 1953 until 2010 and founded the Superior Maintenance Service in 1964, which became one of the biggest janitorial and professional cleaning service firms in the Philippines. Her accolades include the Lifetime Achievement Awards from Gawad Urian and Metro Manila Film Festival.

== Early life ==
Del Sol was born in Tondo, Manila at the Mary Johnston Hospital. Her father, Amado C. Rivera, worked at the internal revenue service during the day, and was a waiter at night. He served as a guerilla in the Philippines during World War II. Her mother, Lorenza Villarba, stayed at home to raise eight children. Her younger brother Duds Rivera was a news anchor for Big News on ABC 5 (now TV5) and Newsbreak for ABS-CBN in the 1960s.

Del Sol attended Malate Primary School, San Andres Elementary, and Intramuros Intermediate School. She could not go to high school, since she had to start working, at the age of 12. She later attended Hollywood High School in the 1950s, after the birth of her third child. She took some courses at Los Angeles City College and Ateneo de Manila University.

== Career ==
=== 1938–1942 ===
Del Sol appeared in three films in 1938 (including Ang Maya opposite Fernando Poe, Sr.), but got her big break as a principal character in the 1939 classic Giliw Ko, for which she was honored by then Philippine President Manuel L. Quezon. This was the first movie of the storied film production company. She made twelve other films for LVN during this period, including Hali (1940), an early example of the Sarong genre, and Sawing Gantimpala (1940), which was based on a song written for del Sol by First Lady Aurora Quezon.

=== 1946–1952 ===
LVN stopped film production during World War II, when the Philippines was occupied by Japan. Del Sol volunteered for the Red Cross, and frequented Prisoner of War camps along with other "Blue Ladies" of the Philippine film industry. LVN's first post-war film, Orasang Ginto again starred del Sol. She made more than twenty other films during this period including Garrison 13 (1946), which recounted atrocities committed by the Imperial Japanese Army in the Philippines during the war.

=== 1960 onwards ===
Del Sol migrated to the United States, and lived there and in Europe for much of the 1950s. She returned to the Philippines in the 1960s, when she made two more films, and starred in the hit television series Problema Mo Na Yan. She continued her work as an actress well into her 80s, most recently as a lead in the television series Rosalka.

=== Actors and directors ===
Del Sol acted opposite all the male leads of her period, including Teddy Benavídez, Fred Cortes, Armando Goyena, Fernando Poe, Sr., José Padilla, Jr., Ely Ramos, Jaime de la Rosa, Rogelio de la Rosa, and Leopoldo Salcedo. She was directed by Lamberto V. Avellana, Emmanuel Borlaza, Manuel Conde, Ramon A. Estella, Gregorio Fernandez, Gerardo de León, José Nepomuceno, Vicente Salumbides, Manuel Silos, and Carlos Vander Tolosa.

=== Awards ===
- The Cinema's Living Treasure Citation, 1994, The Metropolitan Manila Authority and The Metro Manila Film Festival
- Nagtatanging Gawad Urian, 2013, Manunuri ng Pelikulang Pilipino
- House Resolution No. 165 Honoring Clarita Villarba Rivera, Also Known As Mila Del Sol, For Her Contributions To The Movie Industry That Enriched The Philippine Culture, And To Philippine Society In General, 2014, Philippine Congress

== Business and philanthropy ==
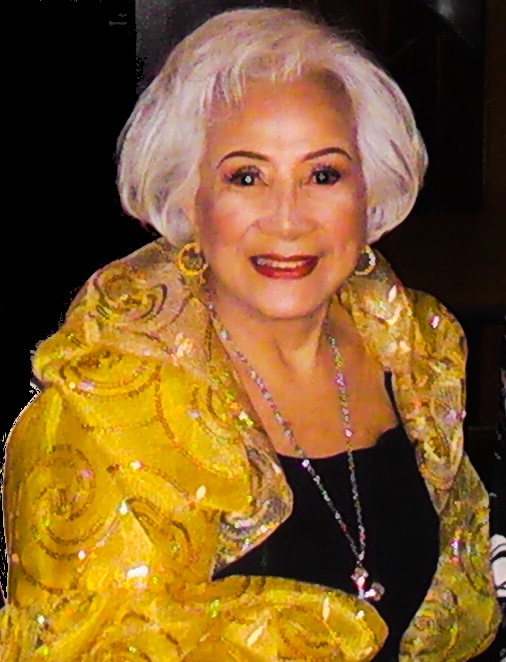
Del Sol in 2010

In 1964, del Sol founded Superior Maintenance Services, which has employed over 100,000 people, and continues to be managed by her grandchildren. Del Sol chaired the Pagasa ng Kabataan Foundation, which provides scholarships to indigent youth, and affordable housing to the elderly, and the Mila del Sol & Eddie Romero Fund for Community Development, which supports nonprofits and non-governmental organizations focused on local improvement. Del Sol has also been an active member or officer of several philanthropic organizations, including Lions Club, Mowelfund, the Philippine National Red Cross, and the Rotary Club.

== Relationships ==
Del Sol is the mother of Filipina actress and television host Jeanne Young, non-profit professionals Ancel Edgar Romero and Leo John Romero, grandmother of famed musician Ira Cruz, Philippine Congressman Gustavo Tambunting of Parañaque, actor Onemig Bondoc, and aunt of Former Mayor of Muntinlupa Ignacio Bunye.

== Death ==
She died on November 10, 2020, in Parañaque, Philippines at the age of 97.

== Selected filmography ==
=== Film ===
- 1938 - Ang Maya
- 1938 - Hatol ng Mataas na Langit
- 1938 - Mariang Alimango
- 1939 - Giliw Ko
- 1940 - Hali
- 1940 - Prinsesa ng Kumintang
- 1940 - Sawing Gantimpala
- 1940 - Maginoong Takas
- 1940 - Nag-iisang Sangla
- 1941 - Angelita
- 1941 - Hiyas ng Dagat
- 1941 - Rosalinda
- 1941 - Villa Hermosa
- 1941 - Ararong Ginto
- 1941 - Ibong Adarna
- 1942 - Caviteno
- 1946 - Orasang Ginto
- 1946 - Garrison 13
- 1946 - Alaala Kita
- 1946 - Dalawang Daigdig
- 1946 - Ang Prinsipeng Hindi Tumatawa
- 1947 - Maling Akala
- 1947 - Violeta
- 1947 - Binatang Taring
- 1947 - Sa Ngiti Mo Lamang
- 1947 - Romansa
- 1947 - Sarungbanggi
- 1948 - Malaya (Mutya sa Gubat)
- 1949 - Hiyas ng Pamilihan
- 1949 - Kuba sa Quiapo
- 1949 - Lupang Pangako
- 1949 - Batalyong XIII
- 1949 - Don Juan Teñoso
- 1949 - Milyonaria
- 1950 - Nuno sa Punso
- 1950 - Dayang-Dayang
- 1950 - In Despair
- 1950 - Tatlong Limbas
- 1951 - Reyna Elena
- 1951 - Anak ng Pulubi
- 1952 - Romansa sa Nayon
- 1952 - Haring Solomon at Reyna Sheba
- 1957 - Escapade in Japan
- 1960 - Pakipot
- 1960 - Tatlong Magdalena
- 1961 - Espionage: Far East
- 1962 - Santa Clarang Pinung-Pino
- 1969 - Young Girl
- 1974 - Batya't Palu-palo
- 1989 - Kahit Wala Ka Na

=== Television ===
- Counterthrust
- Rawhide
- Silent Service
- Problema Mo Na Yan
- Talagang Ganyan (with Leopoldo Salcedo, Dindo Fernando, and Jeanne Young)
- Rosalka (2010)
