= Filippo Sacchi =

Italian film critic (1887-1971)

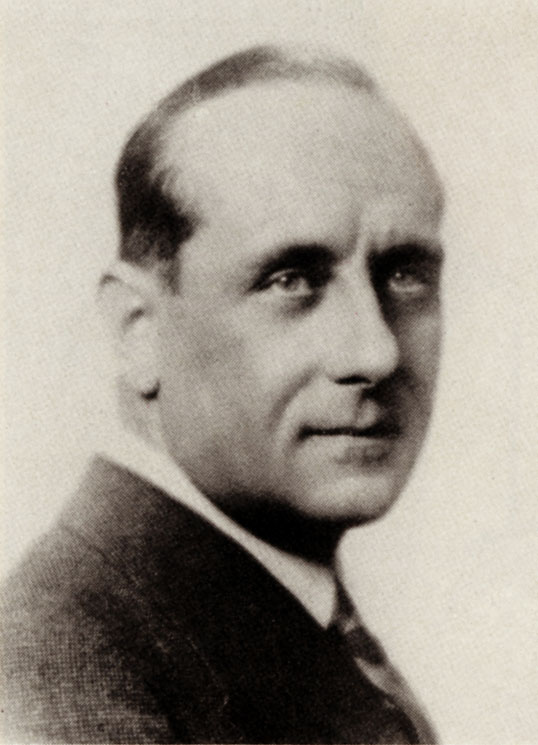
- Born: 6 April 1887; Vicenza, Kingdom of Italy
- Died: 8 September 1971 (aged 84); Pietrasanta, Italy
- Occupation: Film critic

Filippo Sacchi (6 April 1887 – 8 September 1971) was an Italian film critic and journalist.

== Life and career ==
Born in Vicenza, Sacchi graduated in letters from the University of Padua. He made his debut as a journalist in 1914, working for various local magazines and newspapers.

After moving to Milan and becoming a foreign correspondent in Corriere della Sera, in 1926 Sacchi lost his job because of his anti-fascism. Shortly afterward, he resumed collaborating with the newspaper as a film critic under a pseudonym, but in 1940, his anticonformism and his political views once again led to his dismissal. In 1943, he moved to Switzerland, where he stayed as a political refugee until the end of the war.

After the war, Sacchi collaborated with various publications, notably being the official film critic of Epoca between 1950 and 1970. He was also a novelist, an essayist and occasionally a screenwriter. Hospitalized with pneumonia at Pietrasanta's Civil Hospital, he died from circulatory collapse on 8 September 1971, aged 84.
