= Fred Cortes =

Filipino actor (1921–1964)

- Born: Fred Louis Osburn; October 29, 1921
- Died: May 24, 1964 (aged 42)
- Occupation: Actor
- Years active: 1940–1950

Fred Cortes (October 21, 1921 – May 24, 1964) was a Filipino actor who was a favorite leading man of Lvn Pictures before World War II.

Cortes film debut was under Lvn Pictures Nag-iisang Sangla. His second movie team-up was with another Lvn star Mila del Sol for Angelita.

He made one movie under Excelsior Pictures with Arsenia Francisco, a love story movie Babalik ka rin (You Will Come back).

He made Ibong Adarna (1941) with Mila, Niña Bonita (1942) again with Mila, and Tia Juana (1943).

His comeback role was in 1950's His Darkest Hour under Lebran Pictures.

Osburn was once married to actress Anita Linda, but they separated 2 years later in their marriage. They had a son named Fred Cortes Jr. who is also an actor. He died at the age of 42 in 1964 after a brief illness.

== Early life ==
His original name was Fred Louis Osburn; Cortes was his screen name. His mother, Virginia Najera Sancho, married a soldier who served in the war. Cortes was the 4th child of 7. His older siblings were Henry, Richard, and Gertrude, while Gloria, Josephine, and Charles were his younger siblings.

== Filmography ==
- 1940 – Nag-iisang Sangla
- 1941 – Angelita
- 1941 - Hiyas ng Dagat
- 1941 - Rosalina
- 1941 - Villa Hermosa
- 1941 - Babalik ka rin
- 1941 - Ibong Adarna as Don Juan
- 1942 - Niña Bonita
- 1943 - Tia Juana
- 1950 - His Darkest Hour
