= Manuel Conde =

Filipino actor, director and producer

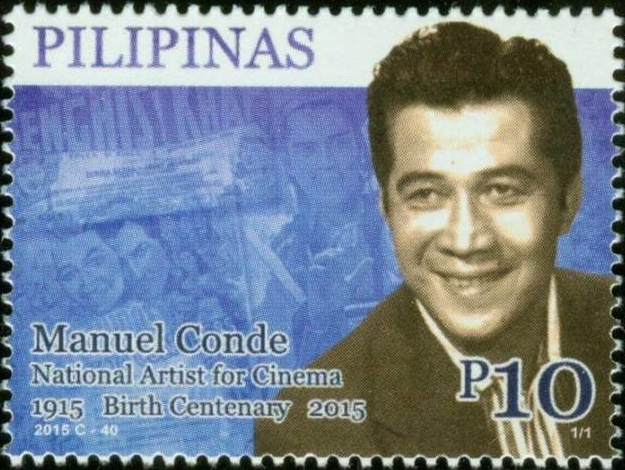
- Born: Manuel Pabustan Urbano; October 9, 1915; Daet, Camarines, Philippine Islands
- Died: August 11, 1985 (aged 69); Manila, Philippines
- Occupations: Actor, director and producer
- Years active: 1930–1984
- Awards: Order of National Artists (2009)

Manuel Conde (born Manuel Pabustan Urbano; October 9, 1915 – August 11, 1985) was a Filipino actor, director and producer. As an actor, he also used the screen name Juan Urbano during the 1930s aside from his more popular screen name.

He was also the father of Filipino actor-comedian Manuel "Jun" Urbano, Jr.

== Career ==
=== Rise to Prominence ===
His first film was Mahiwagang Biyolin in 1935. He made almost three dozen films under LVN Pictures as a contract star.

He later put up his own movie company, Manuel Conde Pictures, in 1947 which produced classic films, notably the Juan Tamad series (Si Juan Tamad (1947), Si Juan Daldal (Anak ni Juan Tamad) (1948), Juan Tamad Goes to Congress (1959), Juan Tamad Goes to Society (1960), and Si Juan Tamad At Juan Masipag sa Pulitikang Walang Hanggan (1963)). Other movies Conde produced, directed and/or starred were Vende Cristo (1948), Prinsipe Paris (1949), Krus Na Kawayan (1956), Siete Infantes de Lara (1950) and its remake in 1973, Molave (1961) and the internationally acclaimed Genghis Khan (1950).

Genghis Khan was the first Filipino film to be acclaimed at an international film festival in Venice in 1952. His Juan Tamad Goes to Congress is considered the best Filipino satire ever filmed. Some films intended for international release were planned by Conde, but these were not pushed through because of some financial and production problems such as Saranggani, a film about the Ifugao rice terraces, a collaboration between James Agee as scriptwriter and Conde as the actor-director with United Artists as the distributor, the Rickshaw Boy and The Brown Rajah.

=== 1964–1985 ===
In the mid-1970s, Conde was residing in General Santos City for an early retirement from filmmaking when he was invited by fellow filmmaker Lamberto V. Avellana to direct a segment for the epic anthology film Tadhana: Ito ang Lahing Pilipino, produced by the National Media Production Center (NMPC). He shot the segment on Lapulapu and Rajah Sulayman in 1977, but the Tadhana film ultimately went unreleased.

== Death and Legacy ==
Conde died on August 11, 1985 in Manila, Philippines at the age of 69.

In 2006, he was posthumously honored with the Presidential Medal of Merit (for Films) by President Gloria Macapagal Arroyo for his contribution to culture and the arts. He was one of the recipients of the award together with visual artists Federico Alcuaz, Oscar Zalameda, and Mauro Malang Santos. From the words of Cecile Guidote-Alvarez, executive director of the National Commission for Culture and the Arts, "This is the President's gesture of giving rightful honor to various artists who showcased Filipino excellence in the arts and cultural traditions in the international scene, underscoring the wealth of talent and heritage in our country".

On December 26, 2007, the Film Academy of the Philippines (FAP) announced the winners of the 25th anniversary presentation of the Luna Award before the actual awards night at the Club Filipino, San Juan on December 27. The Lamberto Avellana Memorial Award was awarded posthumously to Manuel Conde and Vic Silayan.

In 2009, Conde was posthumously proclaimed as a National Artist of the Philippines for Film and Broadcast Arts, but the conferment of the order was delayed due to a controversy. The order was finally bestowed in a ceremony at Malacañang Palace in November 2013.

Conde's eldest son, Jun Urbano (a.k.a. Manuel Conde, Jr.), also became a film director, actor, producer and writer. He is better known as Mr. Shooli in a television comedy series Mongolian Barbecue.

== Filmography ==
=== As actor ===
- 1935 – Mahiwagang Biyolin
- 1941 – Ibong Adarna
- 1946 – Orasang Ginto
- 1947 – Si Juan Tamad
- 1948 – Juan Daldal
- 1948 – Vende Cristo
- 1949 – Prinsipe Paris
- 1950 – Genghis Khan
- 1950 – Apat na Alas
- 1950 – Siete Infantes de Lara
- 1951 – Satur
- 1951 – Sigfredo
- 1953 – Senorito
- 1956 – Krus na Kawayan
- 1959 – Juan Tamad Goes to Congress
- 1960 – Juan Tamad Goes to Society
- 1961 – Molave
- 1963 – Si Juan Tamad at si Juan Masipag sa Politikang Walang Hanggan
- 1984 – Soltero (a)

=== As director ===
- 1939 – Sawing Gantimpala
- 1939 – Maginoong Takas
- 1940 – Binatillo
- 1940 – Villa Hermosa
- 1940 – Ararong Ginto
- 1941 – Hiyas ng Dagat
- 1941 – Prinsipe Teñoso
- 1942 – Caviteno
- 1946 – Orasang Ginto
- 1946 – Doon Po sa Amin
- 1946 – Alaala Kita
- 1946 – Ang Prinsipeng Hindi Tumatawa
- 1947 – Nabasag and Banga
- 1947 – Si Juan Tamad
- 1948 – Juan Daldal
- 1948 – Vende Cristo
- 1949 – Prinsipe Paris
- 1950 – Genghis Khan
- 1950 – Apat na Alas
- 1950 – Siete Infantes de Lara
- 1951 – Sigfredo
- 1953 – Senorito
- 1955 – Ang Ibong Adarna (color remake)
- 1955 – Pilipino Kostum No Touch
- 1955 – Ikaw Kasi
- 1956 – Handang Matodas
- 1956 – Krus na Kawayan
- 1956 – Bahala Na
- 1957 – El Robo
- 1957 – Basta Ikaw
- 1957 – Tingnan Natin
- 1958 – Casa Grande
- 1958 – Venganza
- 1959 – Juan Tamad Goes to Congress
- 1960 – Juan Tamad Goes to Society
- 1960 – Bayanihan
- 1961 – Molave
- 1963 – Si Juan Tamad at si Juan Masipag sa Politikang Walang Hanggan
- 1977 – Tadhana: Ito ang Lahing Pilipino [pre-Spanish episode]

=== As scriptwriter ===
- 1947 – Si Juan Tamad
- 1948 – Juan Daldal
- 1949 – Prinsipe Paris
- 1950 – Siete Infantes de Lara
- 1956 – Krus na Kawayan
- 1959 – Juan Tamad Goes to Congress
- 1960 – Juan Tamad Goes to Society
- 1961 – Molave
- 1963 – Si Juan Tamad at si Juan Masipag sa Politikang Walang Hanggan
- 1977 – Tadhana: Ito ang Lahing Pilipino [pre-Spanish episode]

=== Other productions ===
- In the mid-1950s, Conde wrote, directed, and sometimes starred in documentary films for the United States Information Service (USIS), one of which was Give Us This Day.
- In the 1960s, Conde acted, directed and wrote 48 episodes of Under the Guava Tree with Juan Tamad, a 30-minute TV political satire/sitcom series on Channel 13.
- In the 1960s, Conde co-hosted with Johnny Reyes So You Want to Be a Star, a talent search/Live TV variety show on Channel 13.
