= Ursi =

Ursi is both a surname and a given name. Notable people with the name include:

- Corrado Ursi (1908–2003), Italian Roman Catholic archbishop and cardinal
- Giorgio Ursi (1942–1982), Italian cyclist
- Ursi Walliser (born 1975), Swiss skeleton racer

== See also ==
- Eugenio D'Ursi (born 1995), Italian footballer
- International Union of Radio Science (URSI), international organization
- Sabatino de Ursis (1575–1620), Italian Jesuit missionary
- Ursa (disambiguation)
- Urşi (disambiguation)
- Ursu, surname
