= Pârâul Ursului =

Pârâul Ursului may refer to:

- Pârâul Ursului (Tazlău)
- Pârâul Ursului, a tributary of the Lotru in Vâlcea County
- Pârâul Ursului (Râul Negru)

== See also ==
- Ursu River (disambiguation)
- Ursu (surname)
