= D'Urso =

D'Urso is an Italian surname, a patronymic from the name Urso. Notable people with the surname include:

- Andy D'Urso (born 1963), English football referee
- Anthony D'Urso (born 1939), American politician
- Barbara D'Urso (born 1957), Italian television presenter, actress and writer
- Christian D'Urso (born 1997), Italian footballer
- Giuseppe D'Urso (born 1969), Italian athlete
- Macarena D'Urso (born 1991), Argentine basketball player
