= Ursoaia River =

Ursoaia River may refer to the following rivers in Romania:

- Ursoaia, tributary of the Ilva
- Ursoaia, tributary of the Trotuș River, also called Popeni River
- Ursoaia Mare River, a tributary of the Prahova River
- Ursoaia Mică River, a tributary of the Prahova River

== See also ==
- Ursoaia (disambiguation)
- Ursoiu River
- Ursu River (disambiguation)
