= Valea Ursului (disambiguation) =

Valea Ursului may refer to several places in Romania:

- Valea Ursului, a commune in Neamț County
- Valea Ursului, a village in Bascov Commune, Argeș County
- Valea Ursului, a village in Mânzălești Commune, Buzău County
- Valea Ursului, a village in Miroslava Commune, Iași County
- Valea Ursului, a village in Ponoarele Commune, Mehedinți County
- Valea Ursului, a village in Tâmna Commune, Mehedinți County
- Valea Ursului, a village in Fârtățești Commune, Vâlcea County

== See also ==
- Valea Ursului River (disambiguation)
- Urs (disambiguation)
- Ursu (surname)
- Valea (disambiguation)
