= Urși =

Urşi may refer to several villages in Romania:

- Urşi, a village in Leleasca Commune, Olt County
- Urşi, a village in Popeşti Commune, Vâlcea County
- Urşi, a village in Stoilești Commune, Vâlcea County

== See also ==
- Urs (disambiguation)
- Ursu (surname)
- Ursoaia (disambiguation)
