= Ursul =

Ursul may refer to:

- Ursul or Urs, a tributary of the river Țibău in Romania
- Ursul (Russia), a tributary of the Katun in Altai Republic, Russia

== See also ==
- Ursu River (disambiguation)
