= Ursoaia =

Ursoaia may refer to several villages in Romania:

- Ursoaia, a village in Cotmeana Commune, Argeș County
- Ursoaia, a village in Negri Commune, Bacău County
- Ursoaia, a village in Viperești Commune, Buzău County
- Ursoaia, a village in Argetoaia Commune, Dolj County
- Ursoaia, a village in Negomir Commune, Gorj County
- Ursoaia, a village in Românești Commune, Iași County
- Ursoaia, a village in Papiu Ilarian Commune, Mureș County
- Ursoaia, a village in Icoana Commune, Olt County
- Ursoaia, a village in Ivănești Commune, Vaslui County
- Ursoaia, a village in Pesceana Commune, Vâlcea County
- Ursoaia, a village in Reghiu Commune, Vrancea County

and in Moldova:

- Ursoaia, Căușeni, a commune in Căușeni district
- Ursoaia, a village in Lebedenco Commune, Cahul district

and to:

- Ursoaia, the Romanian name for Ursoya village, Yizhivtsi Commune, Storozhynets Raion, Ukraine

== See also ==
- Urs (disambiguation)
- Ursu (surname)
- Urși (disambiguation)
