= Valentin Mechilina =

Filipino composer and conductor (born 1915)

- Born: Valentin Yson Mechilina; November 13, 1915; Binangonan, Rizal, Philippine Islands
- Military career
- Allegiance: Philippines
- Branch: Philippine Air Force
- Rank: Lieutenant Colonel

Valentin Yson Mechilina (born November 13, 1915) is a Filipino composer, conductor, and military musician from Binangonan, Rizal. He is most commonly known for his musical compositions for wind orchestras, particularly for his Dalampasigan overture.

Mechilina was a member of the Philippine Constabulary Band from 1938 to 1955. In June 1955, he became the conductor of the Philippine Air Force Band. During this time, he was also a student of Antonino Buenaventura. He then assumed leadership of the San Miguel Corporation Brass Band from the 1970s up to the 1990s.

== Compositions ==
- Binangonan March
- Lulay Concert March
- Dalampasigan, concert overture
- You Are a Rose in Bloom
- Rose - Ta - Too, for Alto Saxophone and wind orchestra
- Sapagkat Kami'y Tao Lamang, for Alto Saxophone and wind orchestra
- Zamboangueña
- Andante cantabile, for cello and wind orchestra
- Concert Overture in G minor
