= Tres Niños School =

Private school in Rizal, Philippines

Coordinates: 14°30′45″N 121°09′56″E

Tres Niños School is a private co-educational school offering preparatory, primary and secondary education. It is located on Rita Street in San Carlos, Binangonan, Rizal, Philippines. It has been recognized by the Bureau of Secondary Education.

The school has one campus. Its high school division moved to the same building as its preparatory and elementary building on July 16, 2016.
