= Don Jose M. Ynares Sr. Memorial National High School =

Public high school in Rizal, Philippines

- Pang-alaalang Mataas na Paaralang Don Jose Ynares (Filipino)
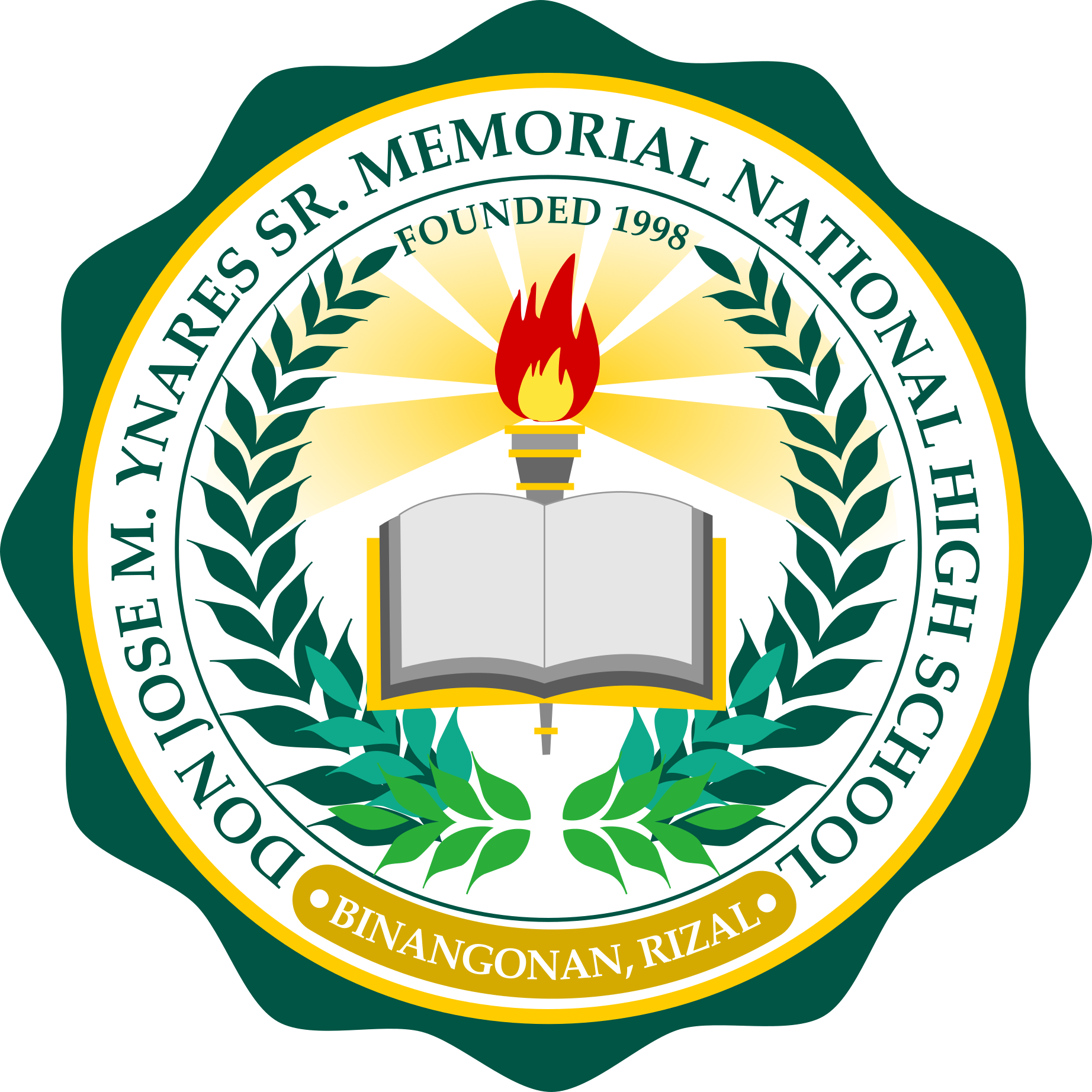

Location
- Luisa Street, Barangay San Carlos; Binangonan, Rizal 1940
- Coordinates: 14°30′53.2″N 121°10′02.3″E

Information
- School type: Public secondary school, School with no Annex
- Motto: Dunong at Dangal. (Wisdom and Honor)
- Established: c. 1998
- Educational authority: Department of Education, Republic of the Philippines
- School number: 301436
- Principal: Roquita S. Suyod, Principal IV
- Assistant Principal: Fernando L. Pambid, Assistant Principal II
- Staff: 8
- Teaching staff: 115
- Grades: 7–12
- Enrolment: 3360 (School Year 2019–2020)
- Colors: Forest green Golden yellow
- Slogan: Dunong. Dangal. Tatak Don Joseian!
- Song: "Magbabalik nang tagumpay!" ([We shall] return victorious!)
- Nickname: Don Joseians
- Affiliation: Republic of the Philippines, Department of Education, Region IV-A CALABARZON, Schools Division Office of Rizal, Binangonan Sub-Office
- School Newspaper: The Montage (English), Ang Basnig (Filipino)

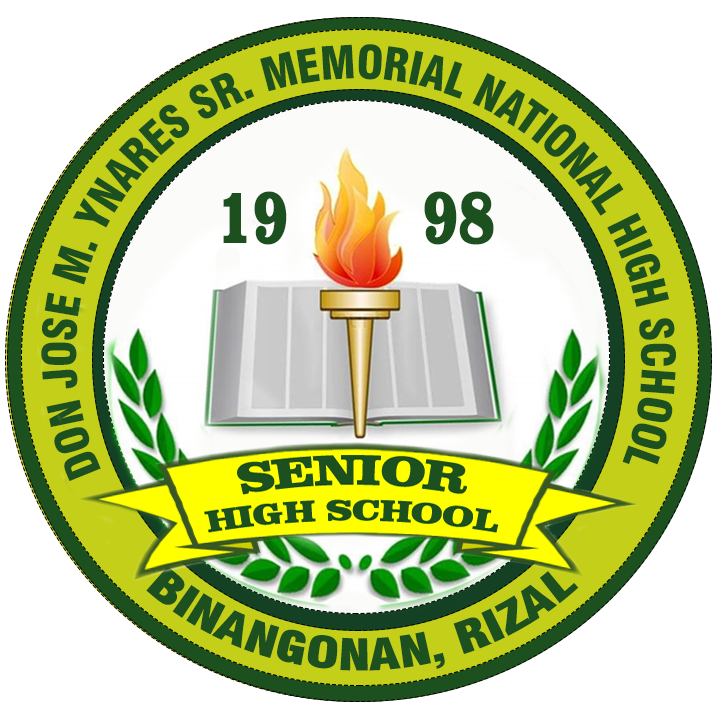
Seal of DJYMNHS Senior High School Department

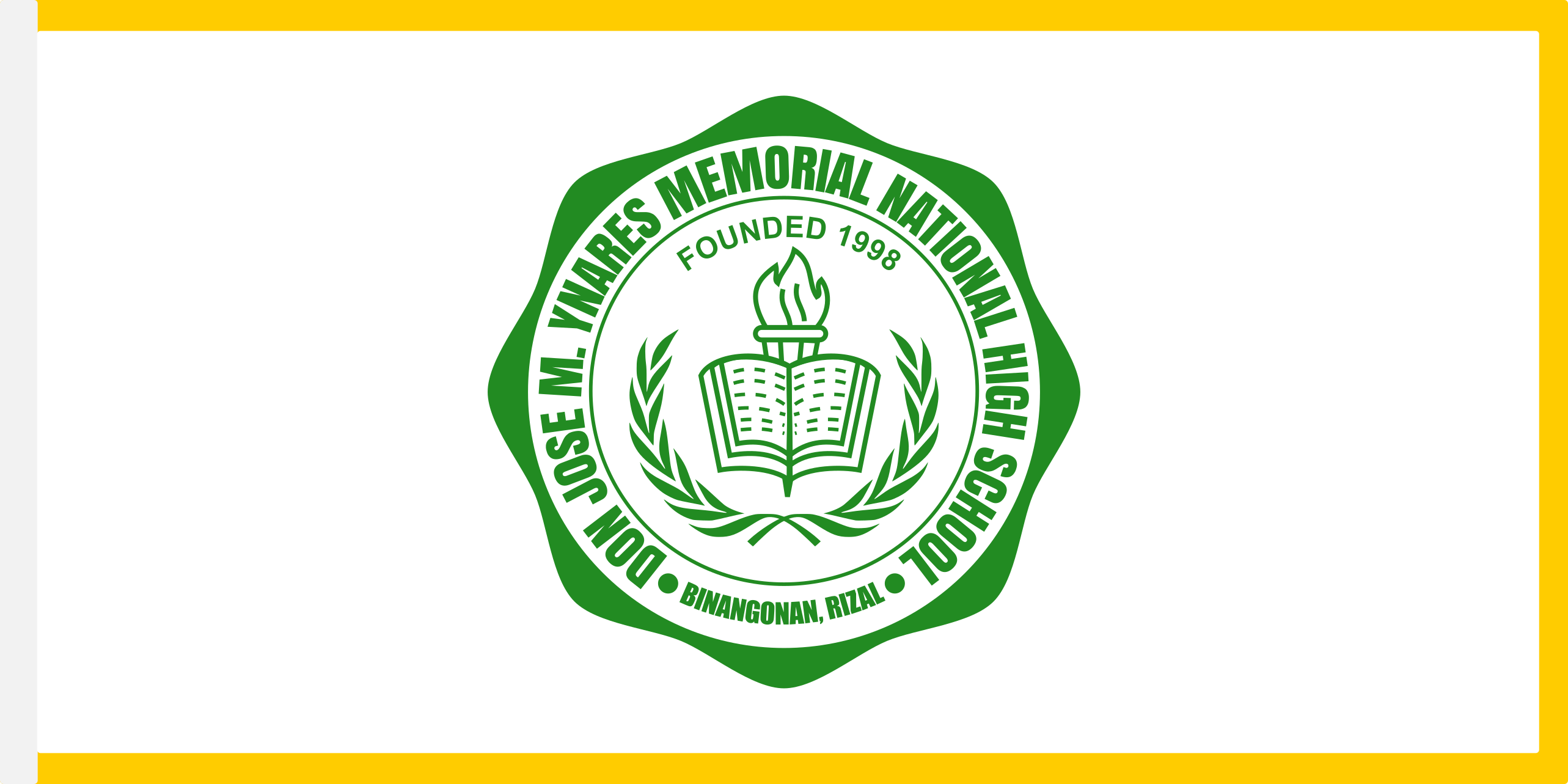
School Flag

Don Jose M. Ynares Sr. Memorial National High School (Filipino: Pang-alaalang Pambansang Mataas na Paaralang Don Jose Ynares), otherwise known as DJYMNHS, or locally Don Jose, is a public secondary school located at Barangay San Carlos, Binangonan, Rizal, Philippines. It was originally established as a satellite school or annex of Vicente Madrigal National High School, eventually standing as an independent school, in 1998. Its campus is located at Barangay San Carlos civic complex.

== Eponym ==
The school is named in honor of Don Jose Ynares, the town of Binangonan's pioneer steward in the early years of American occupation.

Under the American regime, Binangonan became an independent municipality by virtue of General Order No. 40 of the second Philippine Commission or the Taft Commission. In 1901, Don Jose Ynares Y Granados was appointed Presidente (equivalent to today's town mayor) by the American Civil Governor. He won the first municipal election held in the following year and served for four years holding office at his house as the Presidencia (referring to the American-era version of the casa real, and eventually evolving to the present day munisipyo or town hall). With help from the Americans, Ynares made remarkable improvements in the town, and is officially recognized in Binangonan's roster of executives as its first Mayor.

== History ==
DJYMNHS opened its doors in 1998. Its campus was erected on a plot of land at then San Carlos Heights Subdivision. It was through the concerted efforts of a group of parents, PTCA officers of different elementary schools, and the assistance of local government and DepEd officials who envisioned providing a high school accessible to hundreds of students in the area.

As an annex or satellite school of Vicente Madrigal National High School, DJYMNHS initially with ten classrooms and 170 enrollees managed by four teachers was entrusted to Mrs. Adelaida F. Razalan who was then Head Teacher III. DJYMNHS formally opened its doors to its clientele when it first held classes in June 1998.

In its second year, the student population increased to 467, and because of this, DJYMNHS was allowed to stand as an independent high school. From one-building secondary school, it was transformed into a big one through the initiative of its new principal Mr. Virgilio P. Ramos together with his 18 competent faculty.

Dr. Aileen E. Vocal was appointed school head in 2004. She pooled resources—financial, material, and human—to further improve school facilities, therefore coming up with a laboratory more conducive to learning. It was during her leadership that the two-storey, eight-room Ynares School Building IV was constructed and completed on January 25, 2006 to cater to the growing needs of its students.

Dr. Maribeth R. De Dios succeeded Dr. Vocal on August 1, 2007, and set forth on developing and improving the school's facilities, teachers, and students as well.

Through Dr. De Dios’ leadership, almost all of the facilities students may need in getting quality education were put in place—computer laboratory with an internet connection, fully-equipped and functional science laboratory and school library, home economics laboratory, IA/AA building/shop, guidance office, clinic, and Special Education (SPED) resource room. The two-storey, three-room Ynares School Building (Type II), known today as Ynares V, was completed and blessed months before her term ended.

In August 2010, Dr. Maria A. Barrameda took the helm of the school. She focused on continuous faculty development through in-service training and seminars, school facilities, and increased students’ performance and discipline. She maintained transparency and promoted responsibility and accountability by example. During her stay, the school's first covered court was completed.

When Dr. Barrameda retired in January 2013, Ms. Judy P. Aralar was appointed as the school's officer-in-charge. She continued what her predecessor began, instilled discipline among students, and became a good leader to the teachers as well.

Dr. De Dios came back in September 2013 and continued to lead the school. It was during her stay when the SPED transition building was completed. However, she was promoted as an education program specialist in Binangonan I and had to leave the school once more.

Mrs. Razalan, who has been a witness to the humble beginning of DJYMNHS and an instrument towards its growth, came back on October 14, 2014. In her vigorous effort, a four-storey building was erected which houses 20 classrooms for Senior high school (SHS) students.

== Don Joseians' Philosophy ==
Along with the Vision, Mission, Core Values, and Mandate statements as prescribed by the Department of Education, the schools adopts the following philosophy:

"True education transforms a human being into a well-rounded individual with complete trust in God and unselfish love to other people and his country and who values all God-given resources and lives life to the fullest of his potential."

== Academic programs ==
The school offers the following programs as authorized and managed by the Department of Education. The K–12 Program covers 13 years of pre-university basic education towards mastery of concepts and skills, and leading to college or university education, skills development, lifelong learning, and readiness for employment and/or entrepreneurship.

=== Junior high school ===
The Junior High School program includes grades 7, 8, 9, and 10 under the K–12 curriculum. There is also an Open High School program for students who work, with ailments or severe underlying health conditions, and/or for any other reasonable circumstances cannot attend school in a regular manner. Meanwhile, the Science Curriculum Program, with eight regular and three elective science and mathematics subjects, is offered to students who excel in science. Upon satisfactory compliance with the program's requirements, the students are awarded Certificates of Completion during the annual Moving Up Ceremony.

=== Senior High School ===
The Senior High School program includes grades 11 and 12 under the K-12 curriculum. Senior High School is two years of specialized upper secondary education. The choice of career track defines the subjects a student will have to take in Grades 11 and 12. The school offers two of the three tracks: Academic, and Technical-Vocational-Livelihood.

Under the Academic track, students may enroll in one of the three offered strands: Accountancy, Business, and Management (ABM), Humanities and Social sciences (HUMSS), and General Academic Strand (GAS). Meanwhile, students finishing a Technical-Vocational-Livelihood track in Grade 12 may obtain a National Certificate Level II (NC II), provided passage of the competency-based assessment of the Technical Education and Skills Development Authority (TESDA).

NC I and NC II improves employability of graduates in fields like agriculture, electronics, and trade.

Upon satisfactory compliance with the program's requirements, the students are awarded their diploma during the annual Graduation Ceremony.

=== Special Education Program ===
DJYMNHS is also a Special education (SPED) Center for Learners with Special Educational Needs (LSEN). The SPED program caters to individuals with learning disability, Hearing Impairment, and orthopaedic impairment
