= Binangonan =

Municipality in Rizal, Philippines

- Municipality
- Municipality of Binangonan
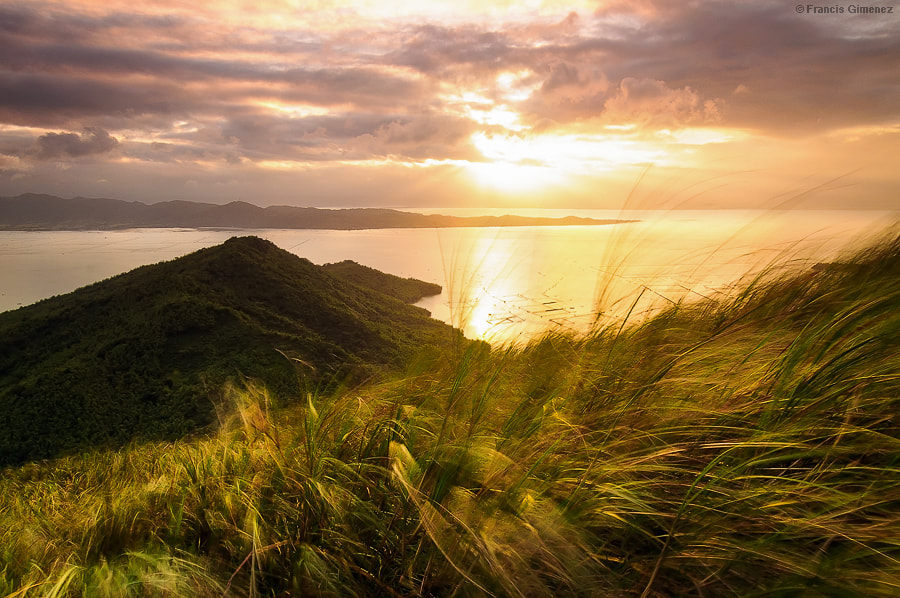
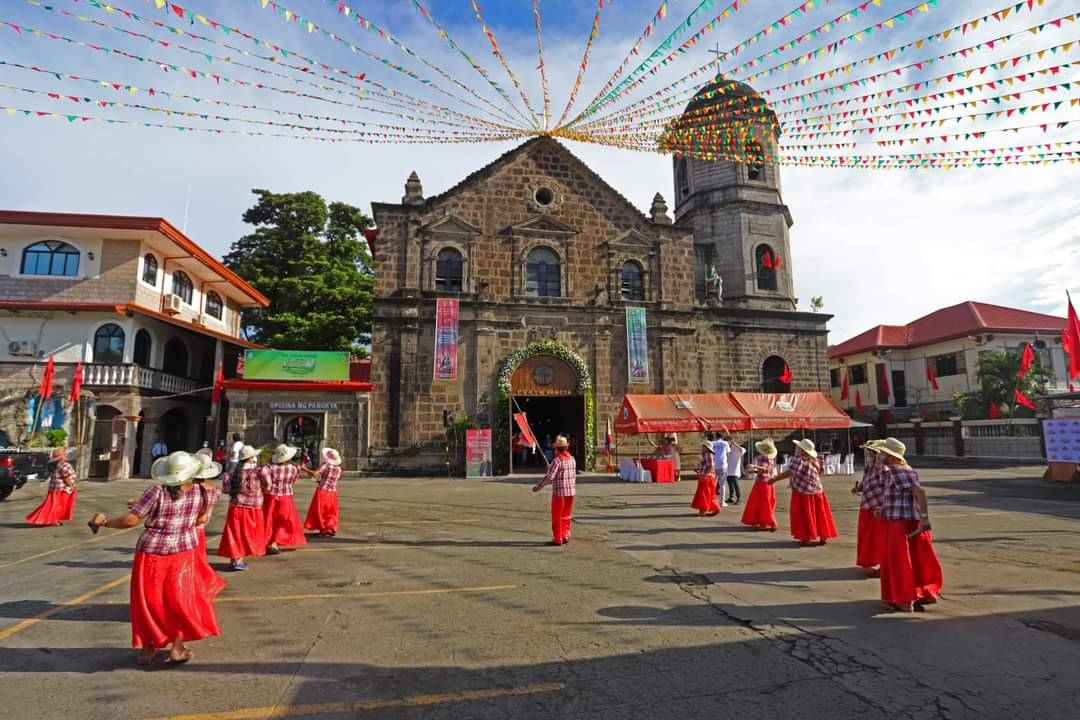
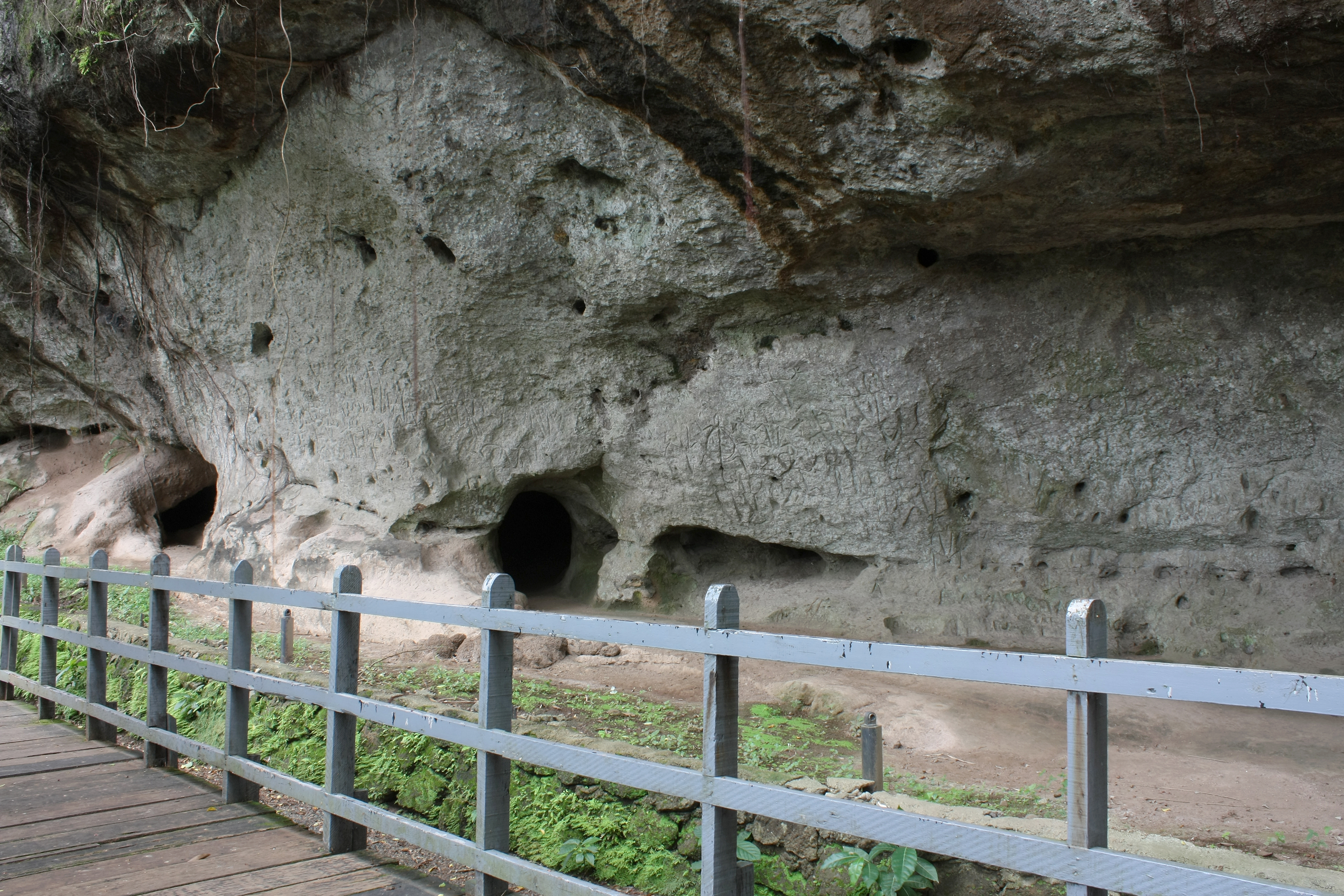
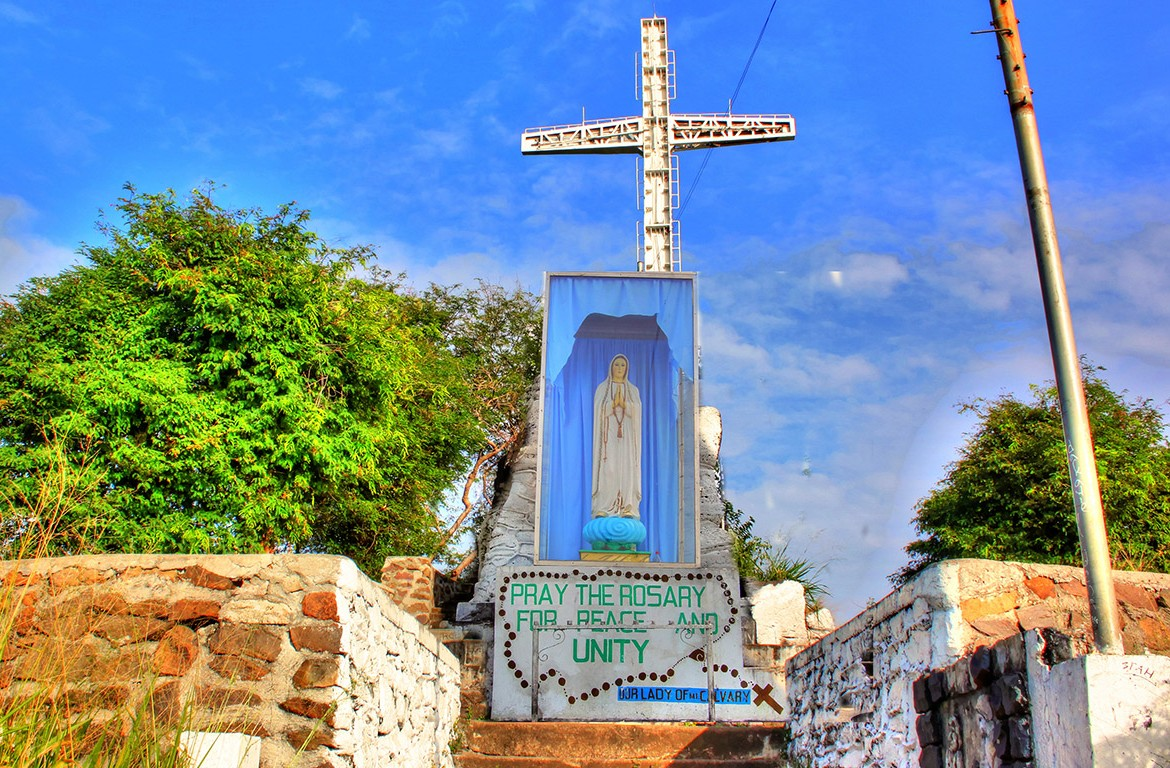
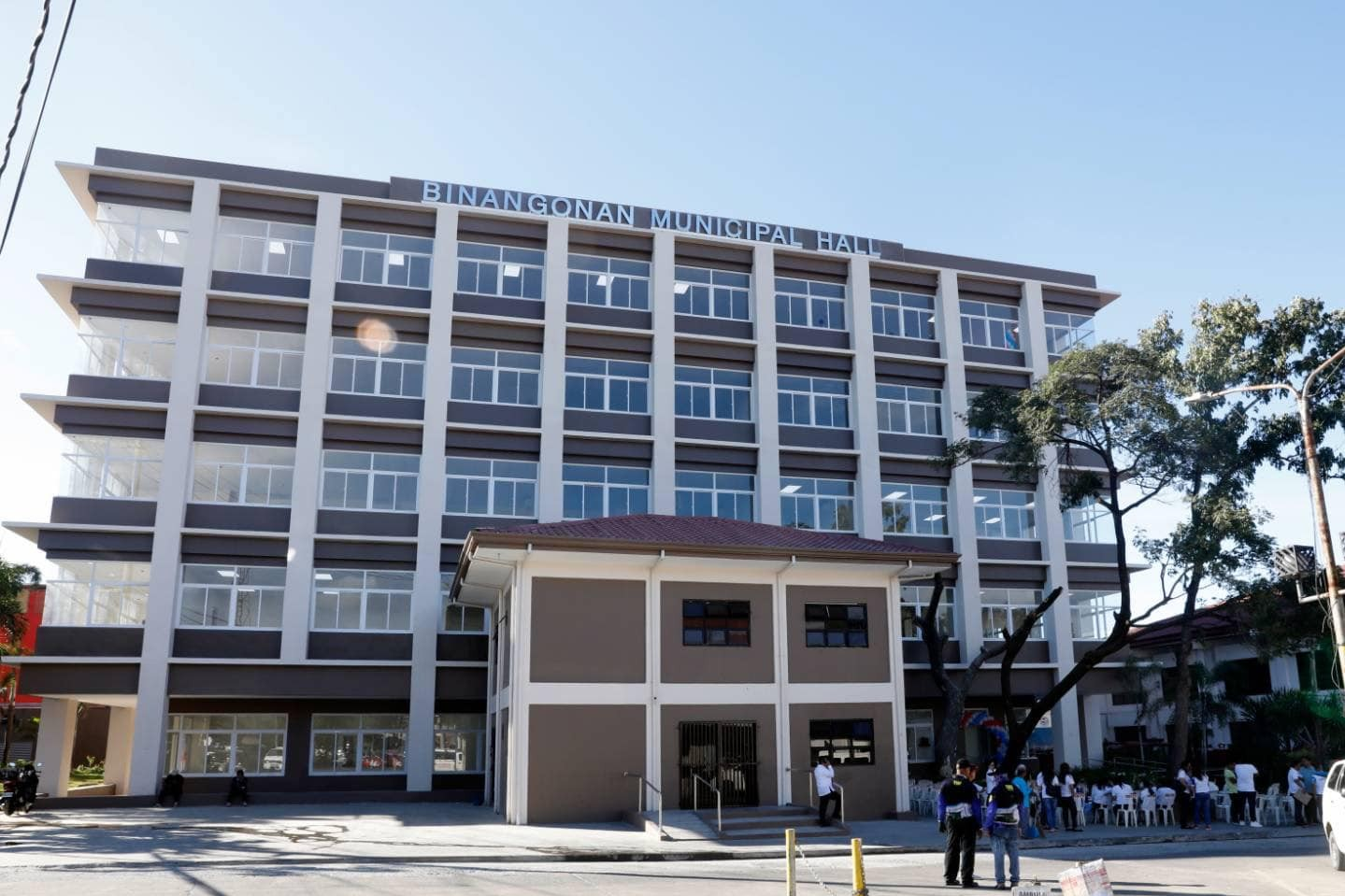
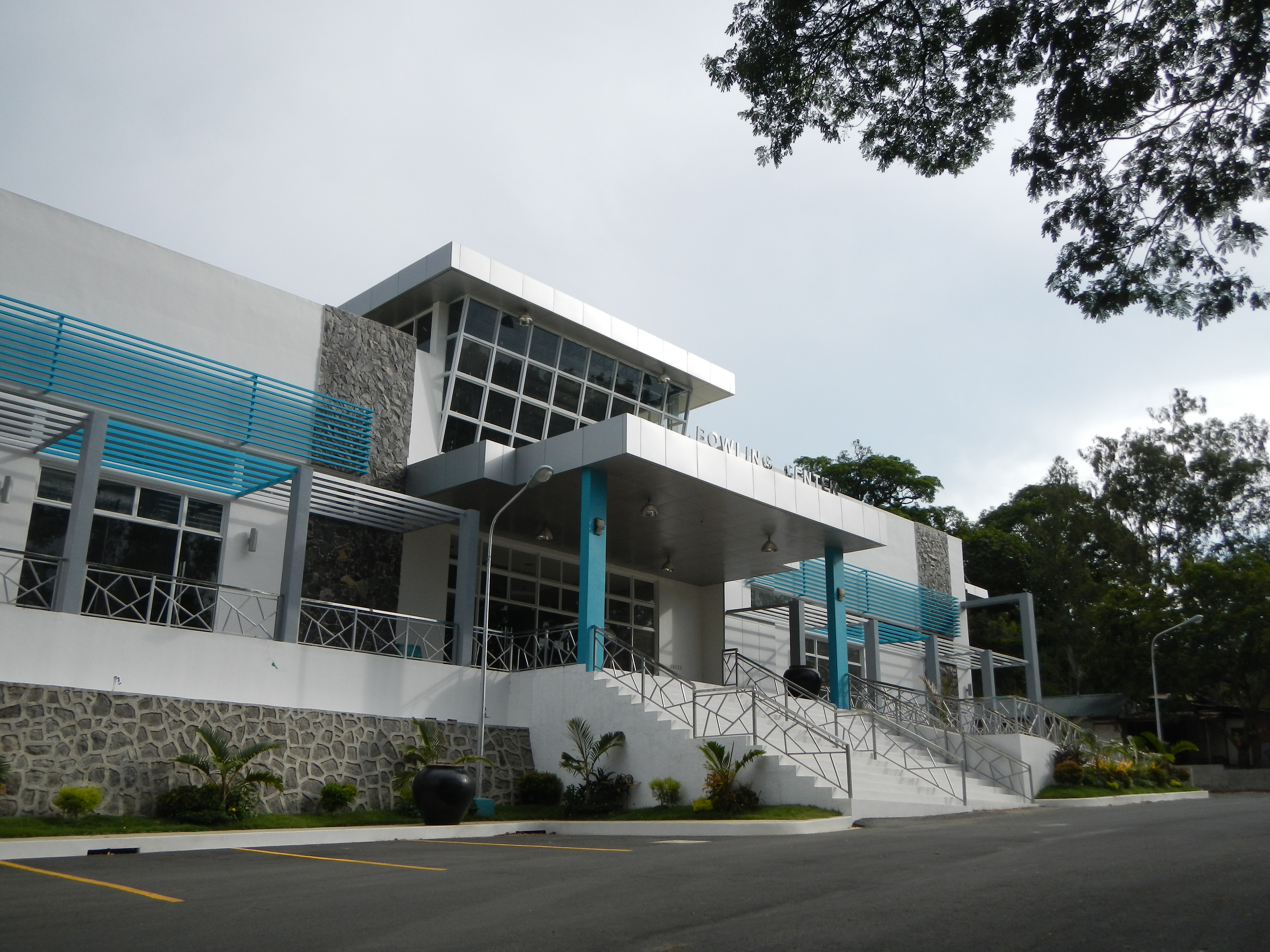
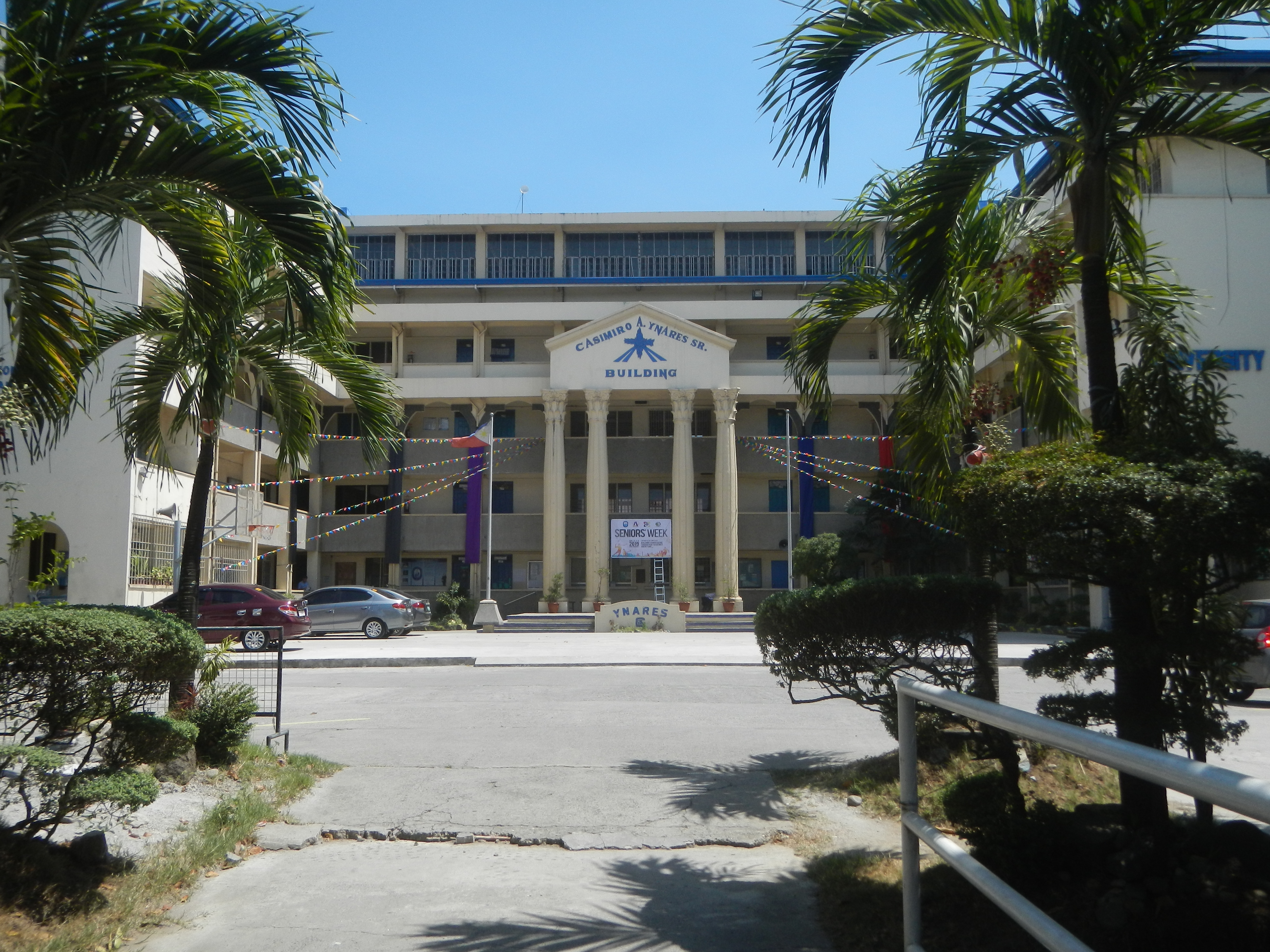
- Talim Island Santa Ursula Parish Church Angono-Binangonan Petroglyphs Ang Kalbaryo Binangonan Municipal Hall Binangonan Recreation and Conference Center University of Rizal System - Binangonan

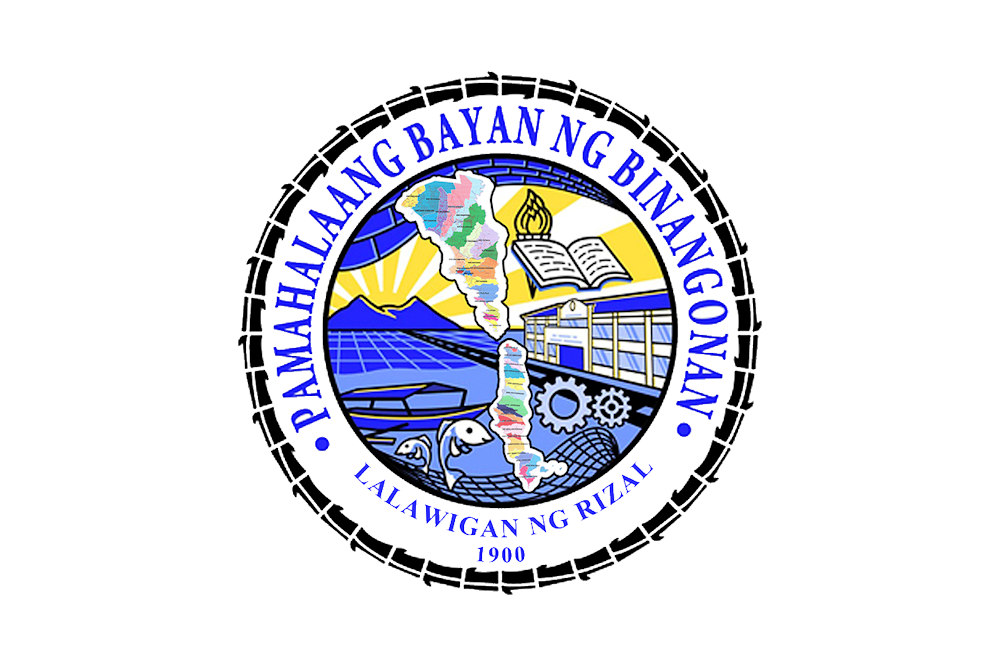
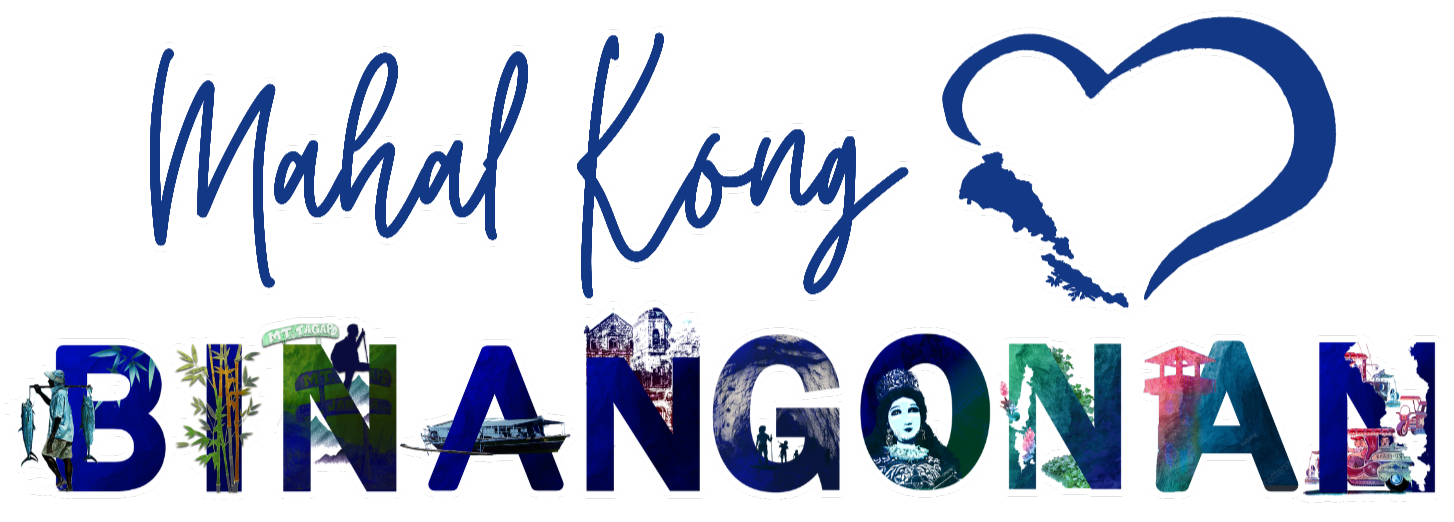
- Flag Seal Wordmark
- Motto: (Filipino: Mahal Kong Binangonan) (English: "My Dear Binangonan")
- Anthem: Binangonan March
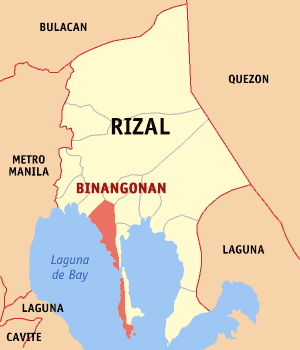
- Map of Rizal with Binangonan highlighted
- Interactive map of Binangonan
- Location within the Philippines
- Coordinates: 14°27′05″N 121°11′31″E
- Country: Philippines
- Region: Calabarzon
- Province: Rizal
- District: 1st district
- Founded: 1737
- Chartered: March 29, 1900
- Annexation to Morong: October 12, 1903
- Separation from Morong: November 6, 1903
- Barangays: 40 (see Barangays)

Government
  - Type: Sangguniang Bayan
  - Mayor: Ma. Elvira Cecille R. Ynares
  - Vice Mayor: Russel Guiller C. Ynares
  - Representative: Rebecca Ma. A. Ynares
  - Municipal Council: Members: Coco C. Antiporda; Jane Z. Apostadero; Oscarlito C. Cequeña; Ma. Cristina E. Cerda; Angelito U. Dela Cuesta; Ruben M. Magdalena; Bienvenido D. Ojeda; Arnel O. Rivera
  - Electorate: 145,638 voters (2025)

Area
  - Total: 66.34 km^{2} (25.61 sq mi)
- Elevation: 21 m (69 ft)
- Highest elevation: 186 m (610 ft)
- Lowest elevation: 2 m (6.6 ft)

Population (2024 census)
  - Total: 321,281
  - Density: 4,843/km^{2} (12,540/sq mi)
  - Households: 74,557

Economy
  - Income class: 1st municipal income class
  - Poverty incidence: 9.71% (2023)
  - Revenue: ₱ 1,129 million (2023), 128.8 million (2024)
  - Assets: ₱ 3,888 million (2023), 4,396 million (2024)
  - Expenditure: ₱ 769.7 million (2023), 906.4 million (2024)
  - Liabilities: ₱ 552.4 million (2023), 730.6 million (2024)

Service provider
  - Electricity: Manila Electric Company (Meralco)
- Time zone: UTC+8 (PST)
- ZIP code: 1940
- PSGC: 0405804000
- IDD : area code: +63 (0)2
- Native languages: Tagalog
- Catholic diocese: Diocese of Antipolo
- Patron saint: St. Ursula
- Website: www.binangonan.gov.ph

Binangonan, officially the Municipality of Binangonan (Tagalog: Bayan ng Binangonan), is a municipality in the province of Rizal, Philippines. According to the 2024 census, it has a population of 321,281 people.

A thriving fish port and fishing industry is found in Binangonan, having a long coast line facing Laguna de Bay, including the western part of Talim Island. The plant of Rizal Cement and Grandspan are in Binangonan as well.

== Etymology ==
At the height of the Philippine Revolution against the Spanish government, the townspeople of Binangonan rose in revolt in defiance of the Spanish authorities, as they joined the revolutionary group called Katipunan. The town's uprising was disparaged by the colonial authorities as "Binangonan de los Perros" (trans.: "of the dogs") but the ridicule did not prosper. The etymology of Binangonan (Tagalog: bangon, meaning "to rise"") is traced to this origin, where events or people had arisen.

== History ==
The Neolithic stone engravings of the Angono Petroglyphs archaeological site represent the earliest evidence of human settlement in the region. The site contains earthenware fragments and remains of animals such as turtles and Elephas sp. The area was inhabited by both Tagalog and Aeta peoples before the arrival of the Spanish.

=== Spanish colonial era ===
Binangonan was initially a visita of the pueblo (town) of Moron, until it was separated and became an independent parish in 1621 through the initiatives of Franciscan missionaries. The town was established in 1737 and conquered by the Spaniards in 1763. Originally, it was organized under the province of La Laguna, until it was transferred to the newly established Distrito de Morong on February 23, 1853. The Santa Ursula Parish Church dates from this time, built from 1792 to 1800.

=== American colonial era ===
Binangonan became a town in 1900 during the American colonial period. On June 11, 1901, it was incorporated into the newly established province of Rizal, after being part of the District of Morong. In the same year, Don Jose Ynares y Granados was appointed Presidente or municipal executive. He won the first municipal election held in 1902. With help from the Americans, Ynares made remarkable improvements in the town.

On October 12, 1903, by virtue of Act No. 942, it was annexed to the town Morong alongside Baras and Cardona. However, the act was amended by virtue of Act No. 984 on November 6, 1903, wherein Binangonan regained its independent status by separating from Morong and gaining Angono from Taytay.

=== Japanese occupation ===
During World War II, Binangonan was one of the evacuation centers for the residents of Manila and neighboring suburbs. People hid in the mountains and in Talim Island. The war brought untold difficulties and sufferings. Schools were temporarily closed; professionals turned to fishing, buy and sell for living. Many died of starvation, malnutrition and diseases while others survived by eating camote tops, papaya, corn, coconut and vegetables.

Months after the Japanese occupied the town, Faustino Antiporda organized Bantay Sunog, a brigade tasked in maintaining peace and order by providing volunteer males as nightly guards against looters and trouble makers.

In April 1942, Marcos Villa Agustin founded Marking's Guerrillas, and recruited heavily in Binangonan area. During the summer of 1942, the Rizal Cement Factory employees took action against the Japanese in the area. Led by Trinidad Diaz, the factory cashier and Home Guard lieutenant, they killed five Japanese, including a naval architect, and turned their launch over to Marking's Guerrillas. The Japanese took revenge, killing known resisters in the area, and torturing Diaz for 32 days, but she did not divulge the guerrilla's locations.

Major Teofilo Cenido was appointed mayor of the provost marshal of military police. Weapons available then were one Springfield Rifle and five Granadora from five USAFFE soldiers who escaped from Bataan.

Talim Island was also subjected to Japanese sona. On August 7, 1942, bombs were dropped in the neighboring towns killing four in Janosa and claiming a number of casualties in Cardona. Suspected guerillas were brought to Santa Cruz, Laguna. Even the parish priest at that time, a Columbian Fr. Martin Strong, was held in Los Baños concentration camp.

Late in 1944, the Makapilis, a group of pro-Japanese Filipinos, occupied the convent and served as Japanese interpreters. They were instruments in the cruelties suffered by the Filipinos.

In January 1945, the Japanese took the convent from the Makapilis and put up their headquarters. But they only stayed there for one week, scared of the nightly apparitions of a white lady believed to be the ghost haunting the convent.

Mayor Emerenciano Unida was killed by the Japanese when he refused to reveal the guerrilla organization.

=== Philippine independence ===
Binangonan was liberated from the Japanese forces on February 25, 1945, the feast day of the patroness of the town, Santa Ursula. The Japanese' plan to burn the town was prevented by the timely arrival of American forces on the eve of the feast day. The local guerillas, with Major Ceñido deploying his men in Bunot Mountain, prevented the escape of Japanese forces. The Japanese peacefully retreated and pulled their forces out.

After celebrations by residents, the American and Filipino military commander instructed the guerillas led by Major Ceñido to set up temporary headquarters in poblacion and to do surveillance work. When the combined Filipino and American troops proceeded to Angono, they left the command under the local Military Police, composed of all units in Binangonan.

Napoleon Antazo, the town commander of the Hunters ROTC guerillas, was appointed mayor through the orders of the 43rd Infantry Division of the U.S. Army. Next to be appointed town mayor from 1945 to 1946 was Casimiro Ynares Sr., son of Don Jose Ynares. When the Philippines became a Republic in 1946, the municipal government was allowed greater autonomy.

==== Post-war accomplishments ====
The first mayor after World War II was Jose Pacis from 1946 to 1951. Among his accomplishments were as follows:

- Construction of wharf linking the Muella de Santa Ursula to Pritil.
- Construction of a modern public market, a self-liquidating project funded by the Rehabilitation Finance Corporation.
- Construction of combined basketball courts and tennis courts in the town's plaza.
- Beautification of the Kalbaryo.
- Additional artesian wells.
- Construction of a new street extending from Munting Bundok to M. H. del Pilar Street, the only one in eastern Rizal at that time, which was completed with P25,000 donated by ex-Senator Vicente Madrigal to Mayor Jose Pacis.

== Geography ==
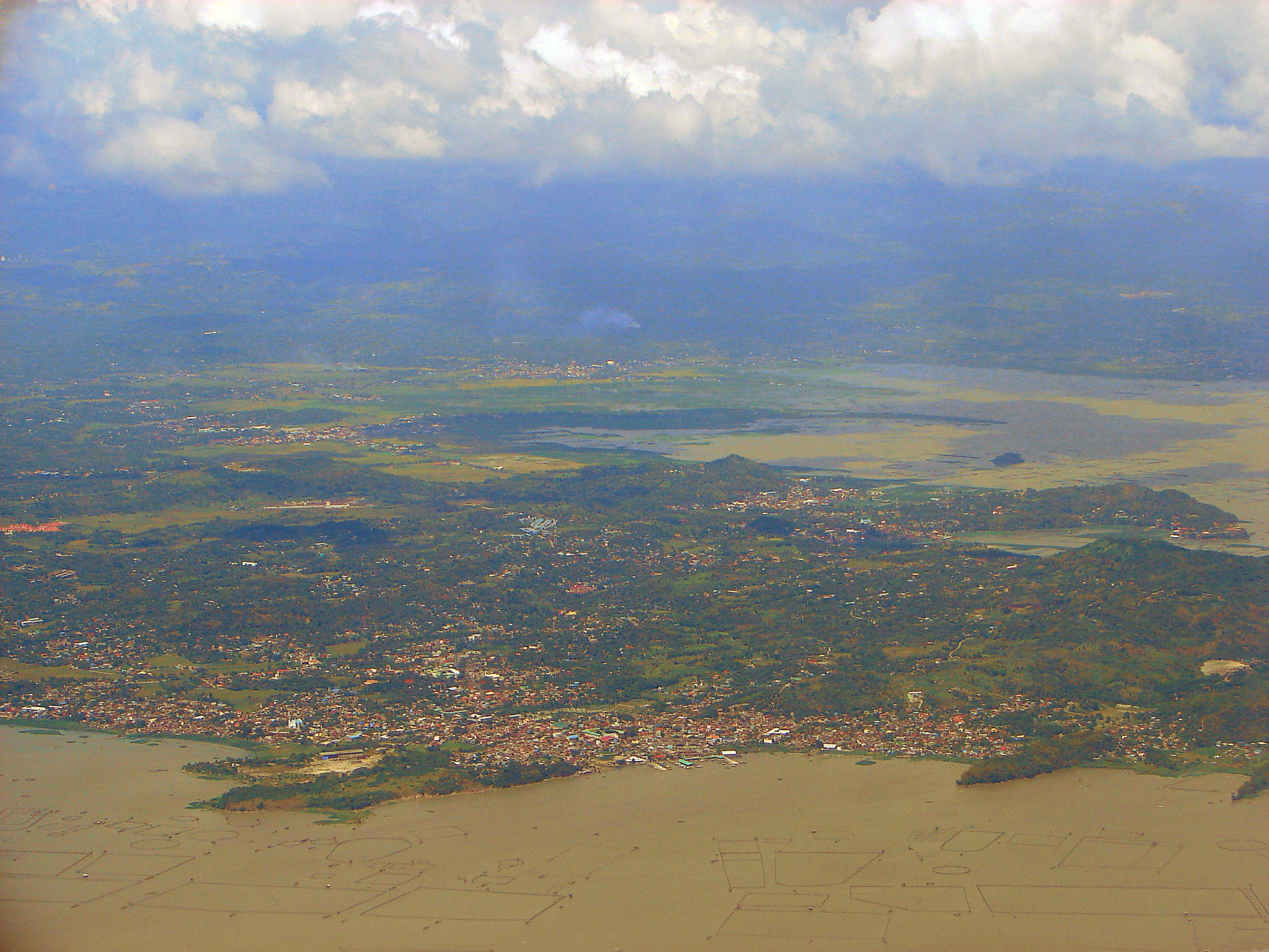
Aerial view of Binangonan, Cardona, Morong, Baras, and Tanay

Binangonan is bounded to the north-northwest by Angono, the north-northeast by Teresa and Morong, and to the east by Cardona. It is divided between two regions, the mainland and the insular areas. The mainland is on the western side of the Morong Peninsula, and is characterized by small steep hills surrounded by lowlands. It is cut off by an escarpment to the east, which forms the boundary with Cardona. Short streams predominantly drain westward into Laguna de Bay.

Talim Island contains a narrow coastal plain that readily ascends into its mountainous interior, with Mount Tagapo (438 m) as its highest peak. It is separated from the mainland by the 240-m Diablo pass.

Binangonan is 17 kilometres (11 mi) from Antipolo and 34 kilometres (21 mi) from Manila.

With the continuous expansion of Metro Manila, Binangonan is now part of Manila's built-up area which reaches Cardona in its easternmost part.

=== Climate ===
Binangonan features two climate types under the Köppen-Geiger climate classification: tropical monsoon with a short dry season and a prolonged wet season, and tropical savanna with more pronounced wet and dry season. The dry season runs from January through April while the wet season covers the remaining eight months of the year. Binangonan is consistently hot throughout the year, usually reaching its highest temperatures just before the onset of the monsoon. The town's coolest temperatures are typically experienced at night during the earliest portions of the dry season. Temperatures are relatively constant throughout the year with the average high of about 31 °C (88 °F) and an average low of about 23 °C (73 °F).

Climate data for Binangonan, Rizal
Month	Jan	Feb	Mar	Apr	May	Jun	Jul	Aug	Sep	Oct	Nov	Dec	Year
Mean daily maximum °C (°F)	26 (79)	27 (81)	29 (84)	31 (88)	31 (88)	30 (86)	29 (84)	29 (84)	29 (84)	29 (84)	28 (82)	26 (79)	29 (84)
Mean daily minimum °C (°F)	22 (72)	22 (72)	22 (72)	23 (73)	24 (75)	25 (77)	24 (75)	24 (75)	24 (75)	24 (75)	24 (75)	23 (73)	23 (74)
Average precipitation mm (inches)	58 (2.3)	41 (1.6)	32 (1.3)	29 (1.1)	91 (3.6)	143 (5.6)	181 (7.1)	162 (6.4)	172 (6.8)	164 (6.5)	113 (4.4)	121 (4.8)	1,307 (51.5)
Average rainy days	13.4	9.3	9.1	9.8	19.1	22.9	26.6	24.9	25.0	21.4	16.5	16.5	214.5
Source: Meteoblue

=== Barangays ===
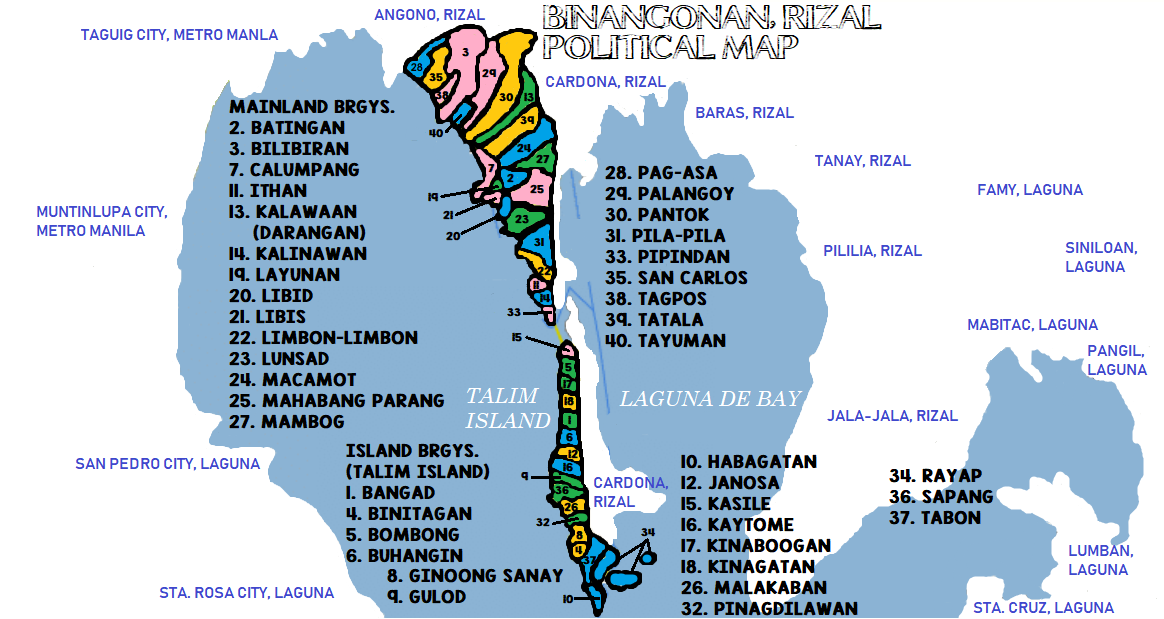
Political Map of Binangonan, Rizal (Subject for Correction)

Binangonan is politically subdivided into 40 barangays, as indicated in the matrix below and the image herein, of which 23 are on the mainland and 17 are island barangays. Each barangay consists of puroks and some have sitios.

Barangay	Location	Population				Land Area	Density (2020)
Barangay	Location	(2024)	(2020)	(2015)	(2010)	Land Area	Density (2020)
Bangad	Island	1,472	1,478	1,563	1,505	1.10	1,343.64
Batingan	Mainland	14,990	16,280	13,931	12,999	1.10	14,800.00
Bilibiran	Mainland	19,911	18,577	16,905	15,490	2.47	7,521.05
Binitagan	Island	540	572	598	680	0.42	1,361.90
Bombong	Island	3,215	3,275	3,256	2,697	0.99	3,308.08
Buhangin	Island	1,881	2,000	1,871	2,086	1.10	1,818.18
Calumpang	Mainland	21,095	19,092	18,596	15,793	1.59	12,007.55
Ginoong Sanay	Island	1,805	1,745	1,638	1,588	0.88	1,982.95
Gulod	Island	1,188	1,216	1,197	1,184	0.71	1,712.68
Habagatan	Island	1,262	1,397	1,275	1,587	0.66	2,116.67
Ithan	Mainland	3,775	3,757	3,090	2,907	1.02	3,683.33
Janosa	Island	2,884	3,087	2,917	2,606	1.74	1,774.14
Kalawaan (Darangan)	Mainland	39,979	39,677	36,853	28,611	4.63	8,569.55
Kalinawan	Mainland	1,663	2,106	2,062	2,023	0.65	3,240.00
Kasile	Island	479	470	475	502	0.31	1,516.13
Kaytome	Island	2,313	2,403	2,296	2,241	0.79	3,041.77
Kinaboogan	Island	1,321	1,267	1,370	1,164	1.14	1,111.40
Kinagatan	Island	1,379	1,470	1,466	1,442	0.55	2,672.73
Layunan (Poblacion)	Mainland	2,409	2,575	2,491	3,370	0.12	1,013.78
Libid (Poblacion)	Mainland	8,072	8,068	7,089	7,085	2.53	3,188.93
Libis (Poblacion)	Mainland	5,012	5,905	6,738	6,668	2.35	2,512.77
Limbon-limbon	Mainland	1,807	1,702	1,590	1,457	0.31	5,490.32
Lunsad	Mainland	11,877	11,748	10,800	10,375	2.53	4,643.48
Macamot	Mainland	11,284	10,301	9,221	8,168	2.35	4,383.40
Mahabang Parang	Mainland	12,665	11,052	8,935	7,228	3.13	3,530.99
Malakaban	Island	1,255	1,149	1,216	1,197	1.04	1,104.81
Mambog	Mainland	11,814	11,372	9,988	7,614	1.33	8,550.38
Pag-asa	Mainland	19,387	19,476	16,848	15,392	0.89	21,883.15
Palangoy	Mainland	18,060	17,865	14,038	13,505	4.71	3,792.99
Pantok	Mainland	18,431	16,800	15,116	13,110	3.96	4,242.42
Pila-Pila	Mainland	9,659	9,437	9,190	8,247	2.79	3,382.44
Pinagdilawan	Island	767	813	778	664	0.33	2,463.64
Pipindan	Mainland	2,605	1,928	2,429	2,841	0.50	3,856.00
Rayap	Island	1,989	2,164	2,001	1,886	0.79	2,739.24
San Carlos	Mainland	13,616	14,090	11,983	10,428	1.13	12,469.03
Sapang	Island	2,381	2,249	2,265	2,050	1.12	2,008.04
Tabon	Island	688	617	823	834	0.81	761.73
Tagpos	Mainland	16,161	15,999	15,560	12,332	1.31	12,212.98
Tatala	Mainland	17,625	16,152	10,773	7,256	3.56	4,537.08
Tayuman	Mainland	12,565	12,300	11,243	10,825	5.19	2,369.94
Mainland		294,462	286,259	255,469	223,724	52.55	5,447.36
Island		26,819	27,372	27,005	25,913	14.46	1,892.95
Total	40 barangays	321,281	313,631	282,474	249,637	67.02	4,680.36

== Demographics ==
Population census of Binangonan
Year	Pop.	±% p.a.
1903	9,096	—
1918	14,379	+3.10%
1939	16,588	+0.68%
1948	20,422	+2.34%
1960	31,274	+3.61%
1970	52,296	+5.27%
1975	63,215	+3.88%
1980	80,980	+5.08%
1990	127,561	+4.65%
1995	140,700	+1.85%
2000	187,691	+6.37%
2007	238,931	+3.39%
2010	249,872	+1.64%
2015	282,474	+2.36%
2020	313,631	+2.23%
2024	321,281	+0.58%
Source: Philippine Statistics Authority

In the 2024 census, the population of Binangonan was 321,281 people, with a density of 4,800 inhabitants per square kilometre or 12,000 inhabitants per square mile.

== Economy ==
Poverty incidence of Binangonan (%)

Source: Philippine Statistics Authority

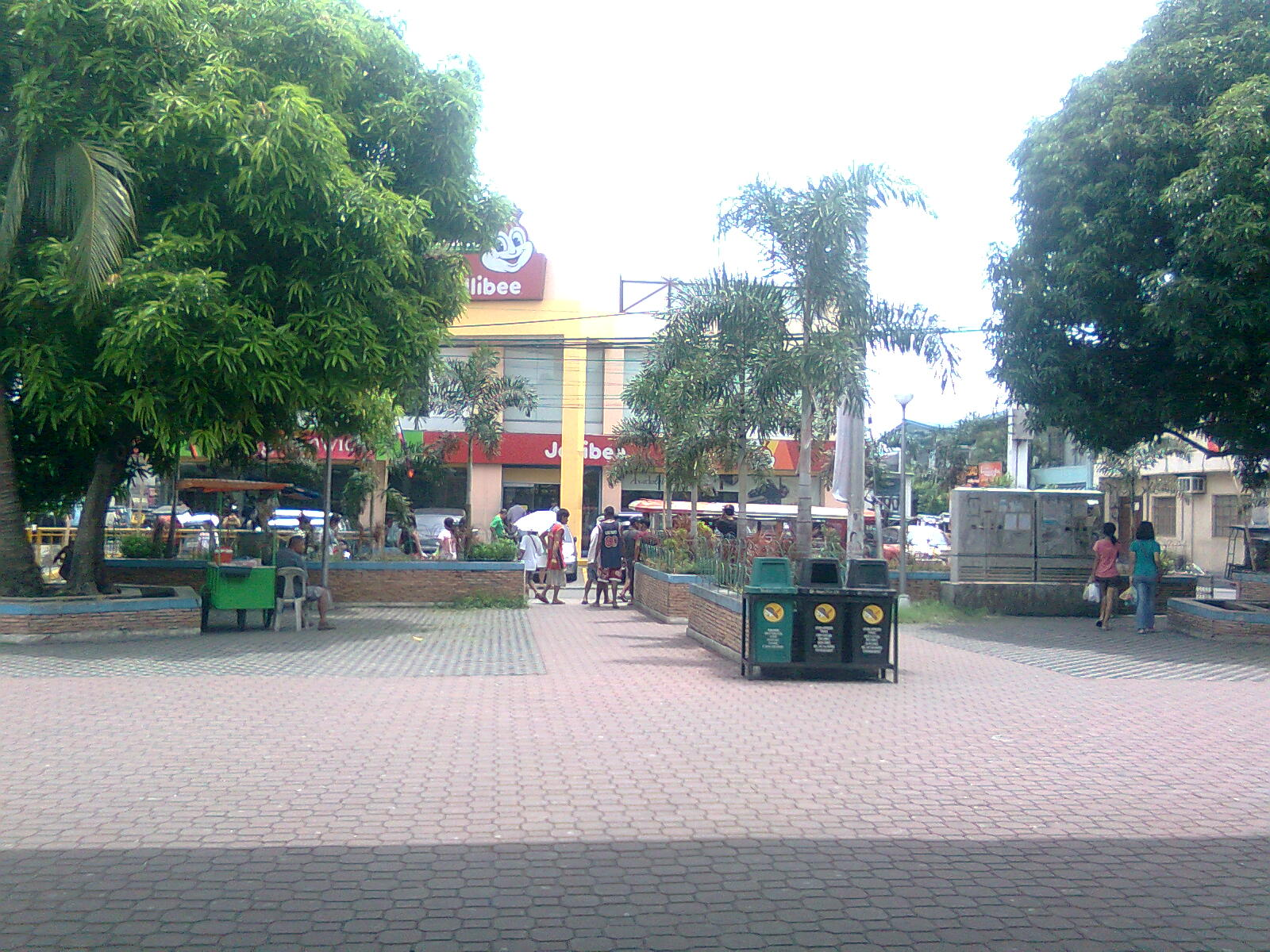
Barangay Libis Ynares Plaza

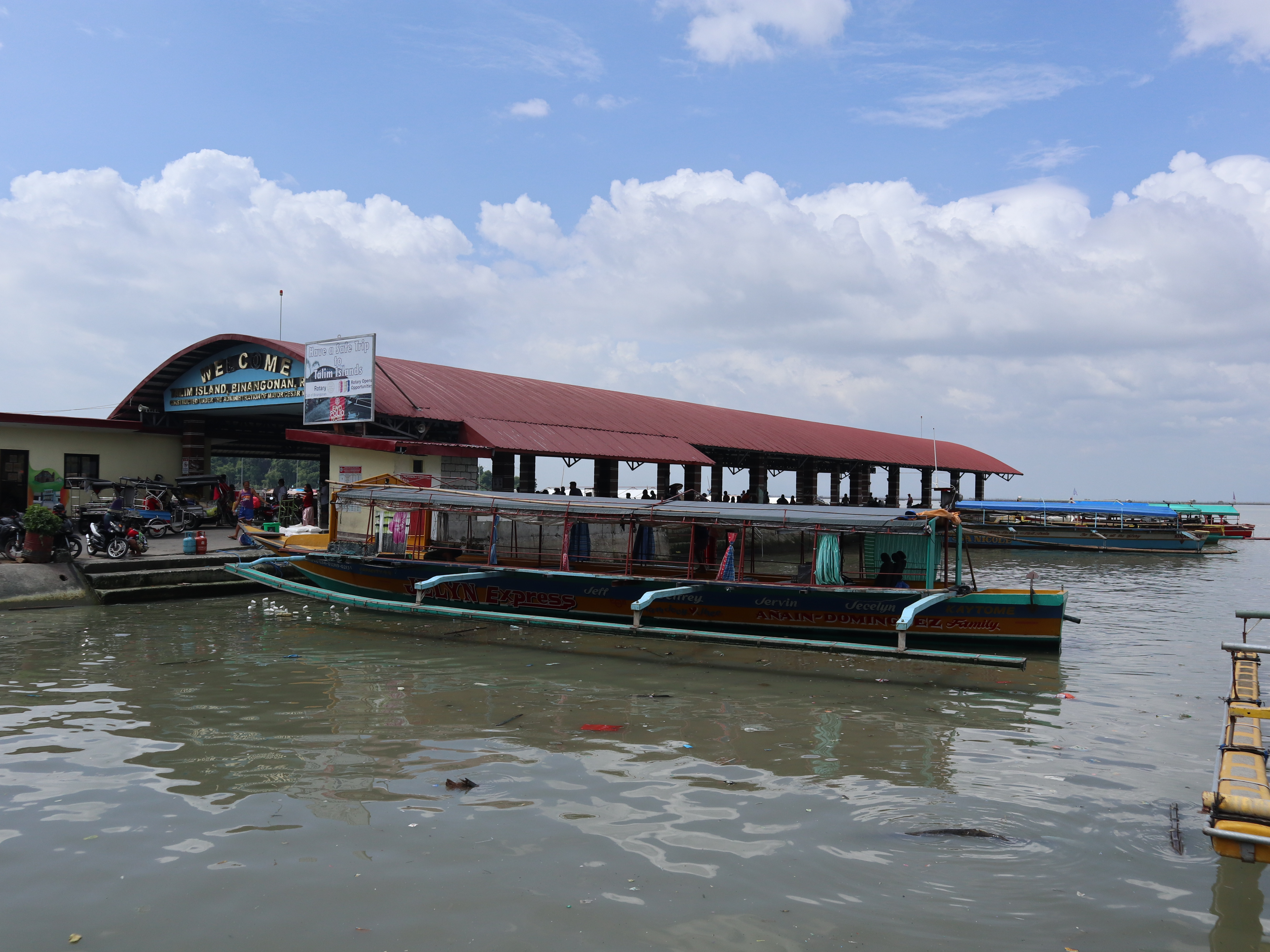
Talim Island port

Binangonan's major source of income comes from agriculture, where 49 percent of its total land area are devoted to agriculture and livestock industries, while the source of income of residents in its coastal barangays are mainly artisanal fishing and the aquaculture industry. Binangonan is a major supplier of freshwater fishes from Laguna de Bay like dulong, ayungin, biya, kanduli, and gurami to Metro Manila, Laguna, Cavite and Batangas. A research station of the Southeast Asian Fisheries Development Center is located at Tapao Point in Barangay Pipindan.

The municipality formerly hosted the Rizal Cement plant in Calumpang and its associated quarry. This plant was the oldest in the Philippines, established in 1914 by Augustinians and eventually acquired by Vicente Madrigal. A limestone quarry in Pantok supplied the plant through a cable car system. The plant was shut down in 2000 and subsequently transformed into a subdivision.

Other sources of income come from manufacturing, commercial establishments, real estate, and public utility services.

Binangonan's economy remained docile for almost four decades, subsisting only with fair performance in the aquaculture and agricultural ventures with no new developments in-place to create job opportunities in the commercial sector. Tourism industry's growth remains to be seen in the long-term. Industries relative interests to the town has to be developed and the corresponding infrastructure must be funded and implemented accordingly to create and sustain future development.

Overall expectations to encourage investment must be prioritized rather than enticing the growth of informal settlers (squatters) in the area which was perceived by many to be more of strategic political undertakings.

=== Tourism ===
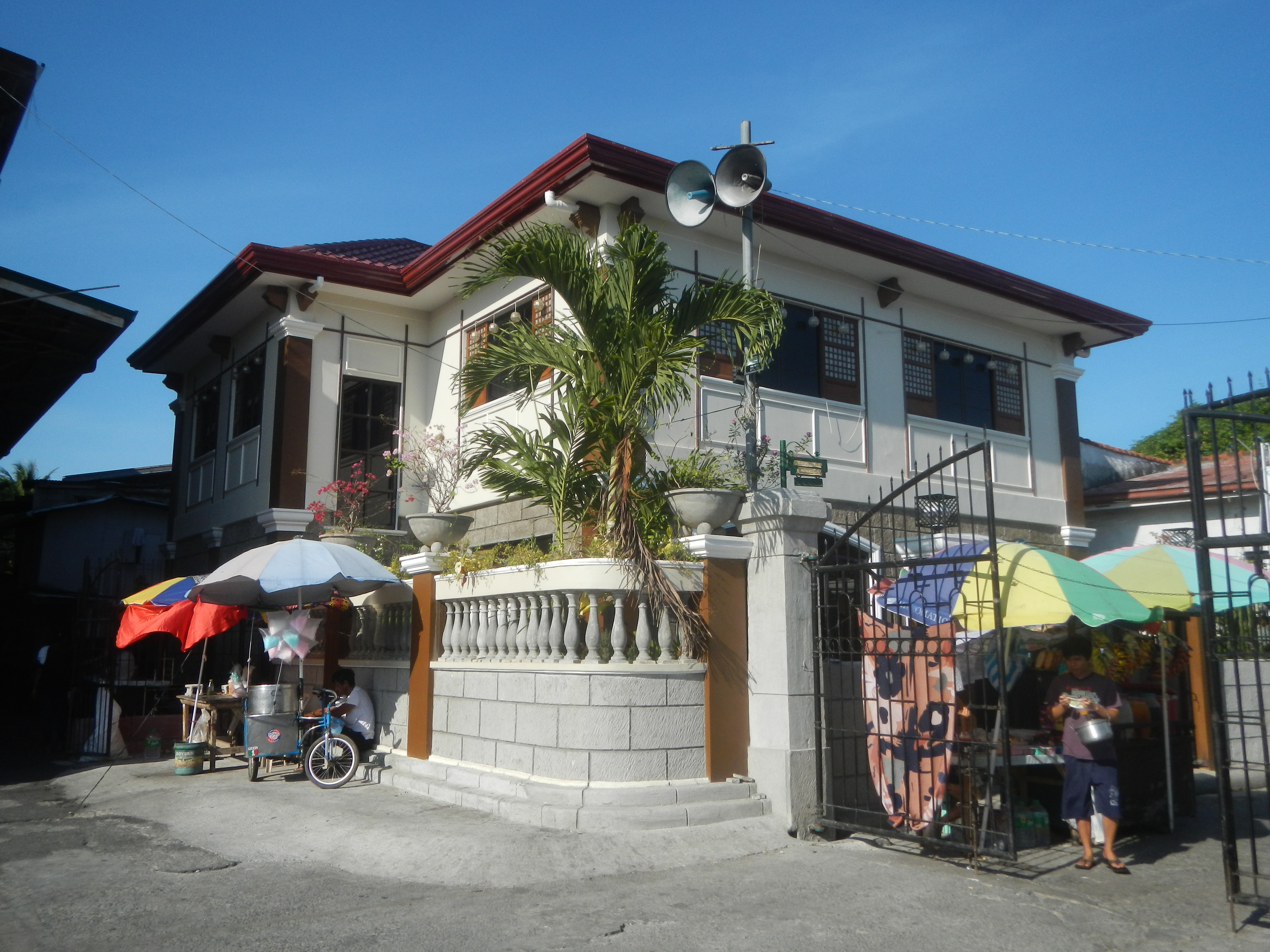
Binangonan Municipal Library & Museum

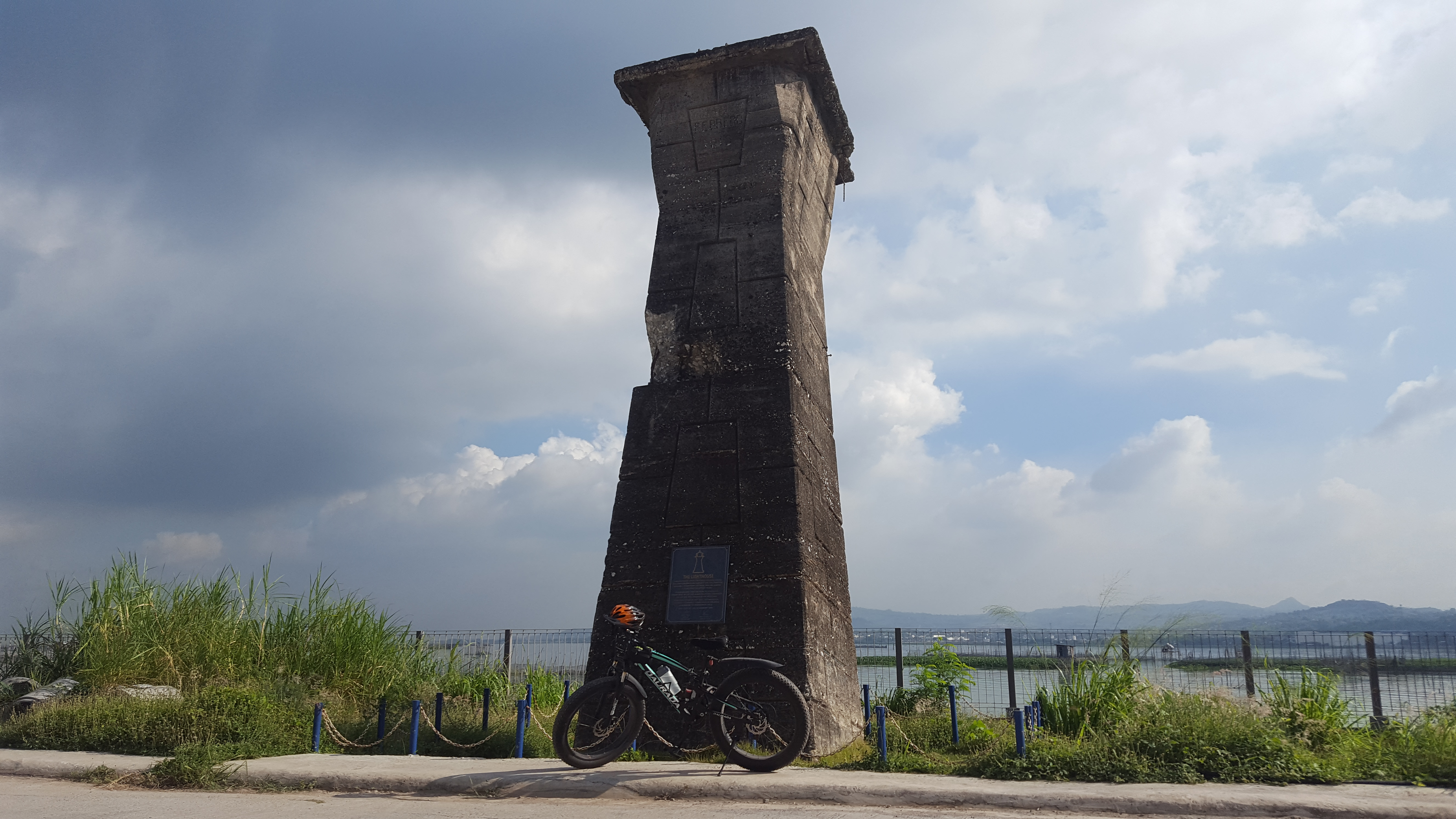
The Lighthouse at Santorini Estates

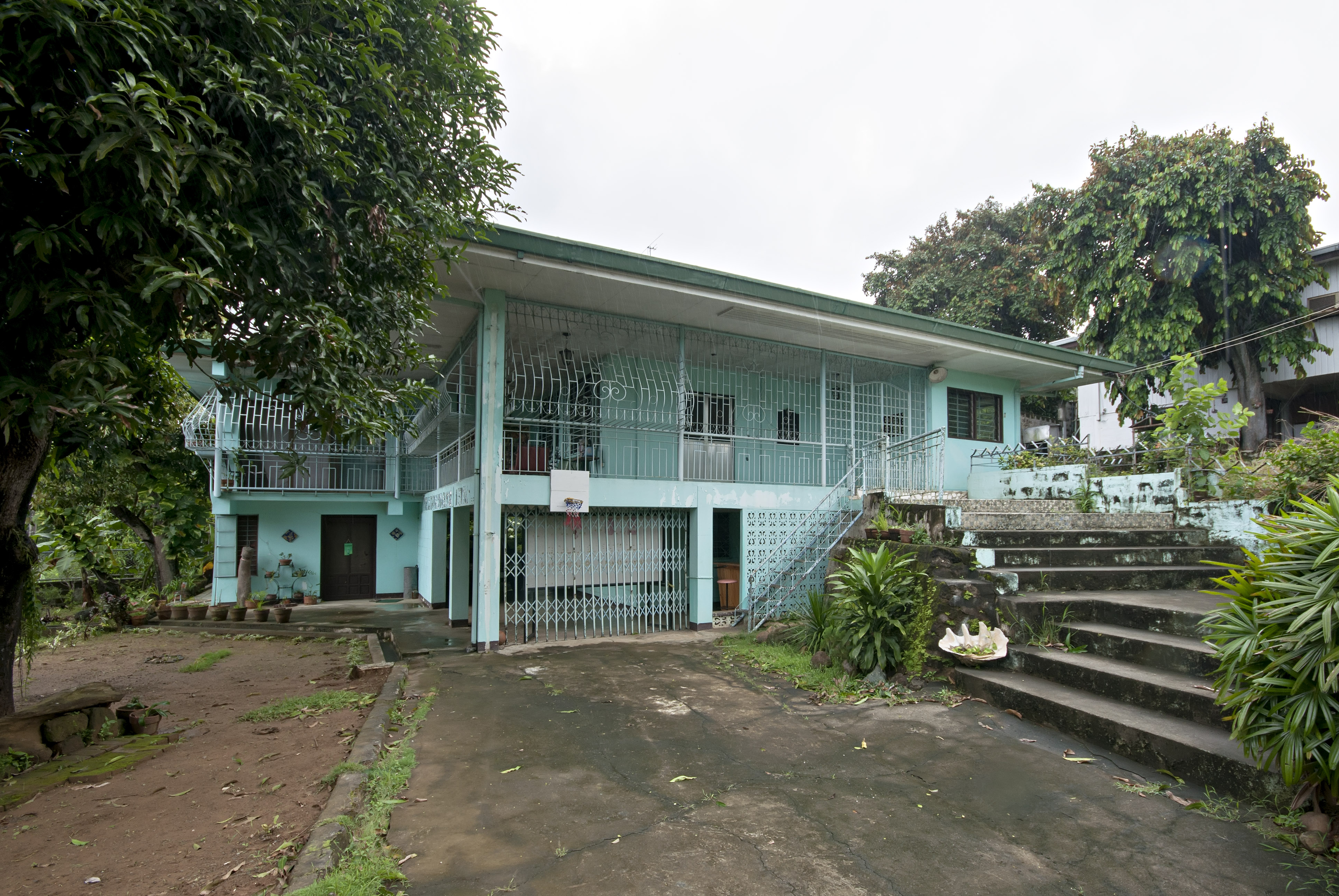
Vicente Manansala Shrine

Tourist Attractions

- Angono-Binangonan Petroglyphs
- Art Sector Gallery
- Binangonan Municipal Library & Museum
- Binangonan Recreation and Conference Center
- Binangonan Skatepark
- Coffee Rush
- East Ridge Golf and Country Club
- Ella Ville Resort
- Escalera Cafe
- Hiraya Restaurant & Cafe
- Lunsad Boulevard
- Manalo Resort Hotel
- Marian Hill
- Mount Calvary (Kalbaryo)
- Mount Tagapo Nature Park
- Nuestra Señora de los Angeles Parish Church
- Puente Del Diablo
- Sacred Heart Parish Church
- Santa Ursula Parish Church
- Sikatan Sikada Cafe
- Tabon
- Talim Island
- The Lighthouse at Santorini Estates
- Thunderbird Resorts and Fiesta Casino
- Vicente Manansala Shrine

Festival and Traditions

- Annual Traditional Ball
- Caru-Caruhan de Binangonan
- Brgy. Libid Grand Santacruzan
- Binalayan Festival
- Giwang-Giwang
- Sunduan

== Government ==
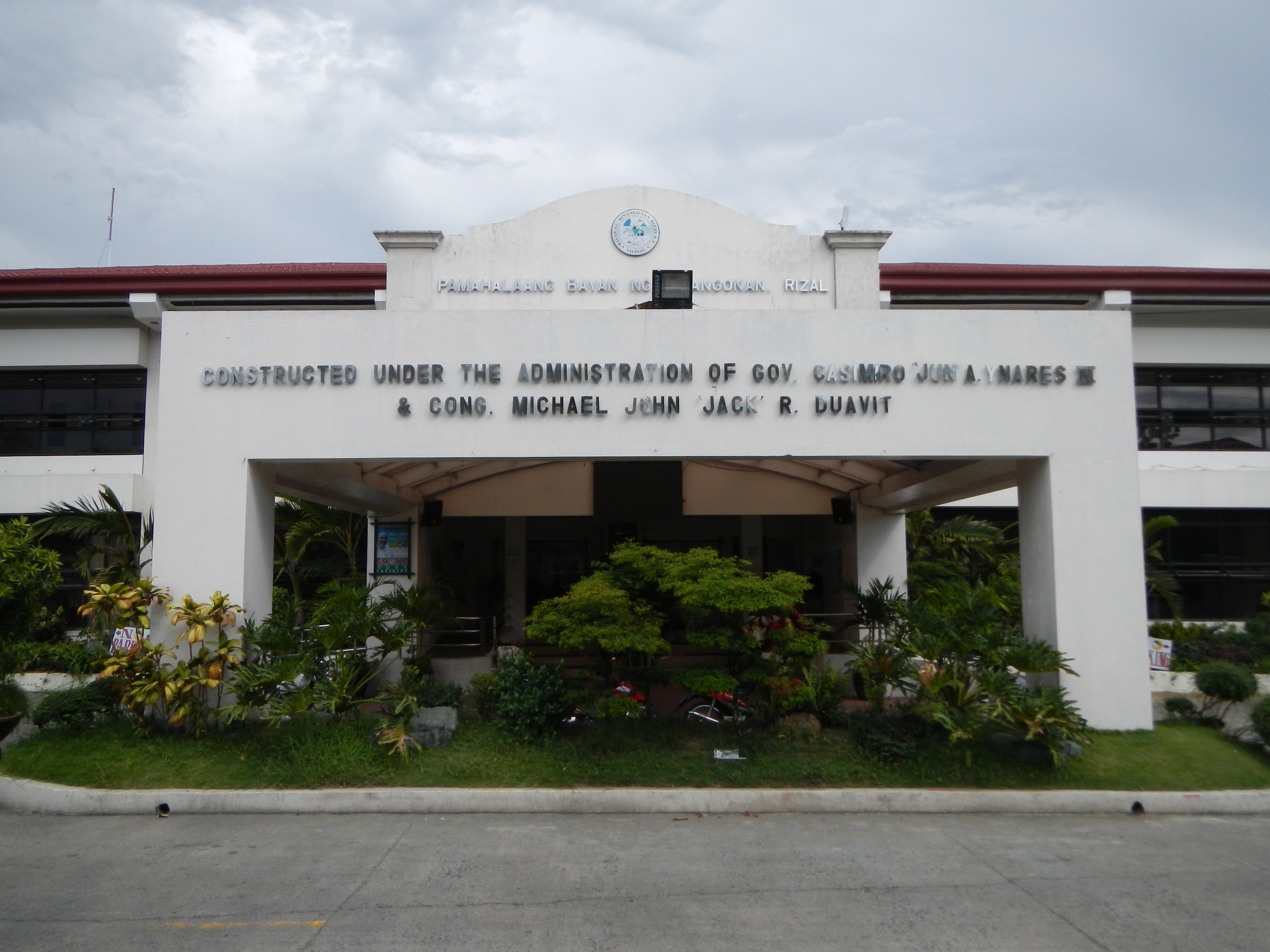
Binangonan Municipal Hall

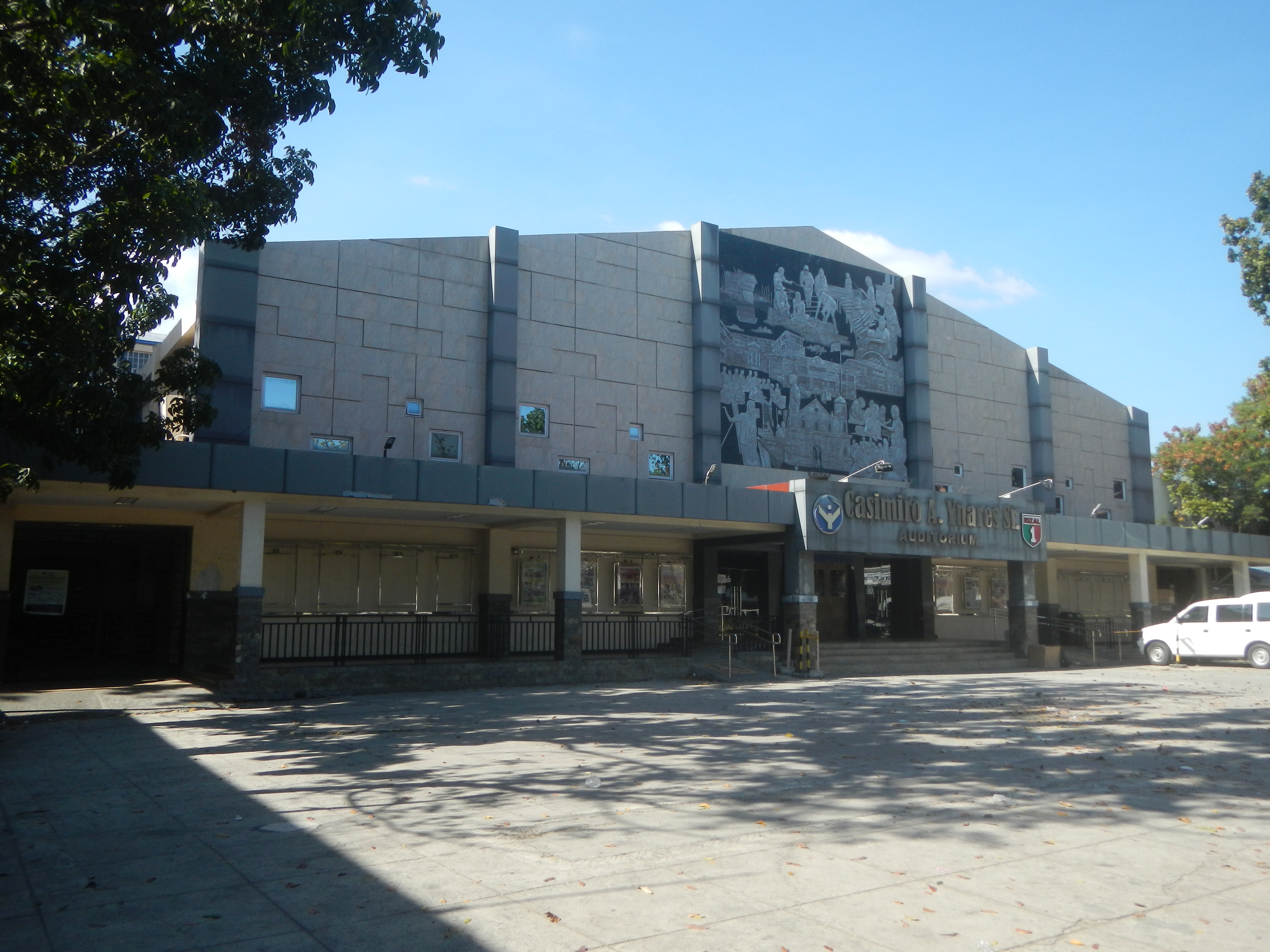
Casimiro A. Ynares Sr. Auditorium

=== Local government ===
The municipality is governed by a municipal mayor designated as its local chief executive and by a municipal council as its legislative body in accordance with the Local Government Code. The mayor, vice mayor, and the councilors are elected directly by the people through an election which is being held every three years.

=== Elected officials ===
List of current government officials from June 30, 2025.

Title	Name
Mayor	Ma. Elvira Cecille R. Ynares
Vice Mayor	Russel Guiller C. Ynares
Councilor	Coco C. Antiporda
Councilor	Jane Z. Apostadero
Councilor	Oscarlito C. Cequeña
Councilor	Ma. Cristina E. Cerda
Councilor	Angelito U. Dela Cuesta
Councilor	Ruben M. Magdalena
Councilor	Bienvenido D. Ojeda
Councilor	Arnel O. Rivera
ABC / LNB President	Cresencio M. Ojoy
SK President	Moses Alfonso G. Cerrero

=== List of former mayors ===
==== American period ====
1) Jose G. Ynares (1901–1905) – was the First appointed executive of the municipality in 1901 and elected Presidente the following year.	2) Manuel Y. Ison (1906–1907) – He raised funds to construct the first municipal building.	3) Clemente Antiporda (1908–1912) – A permanent municipal building was constructed during his term.	4) Antonio Sisante (1913–1915) – His achievement was the construction of three artesian wells.	5) Lorenzo Flores (1916–1922) – Roads and bridges were built and the old market was repaired during his term.	6) Valentin Antazo (1922–1928) – purchased the present Binangonan Central Elementary School site; built the H.E. Building and the Puericulture Center for the Women's Club.	7) Julio Antiporda (1928–1936) – He planned the establishment of a public market in Pila-pila.

==== Japanese period ====
8) Felix Katipunan (1936–1942) – built roads and artesian wells and added rooms to the municipal building.	9) Emerenciano M. Unida (1942–1945) – He was the deputy mayor when Katipunan got ill. He supplied starving residents with food and worked for the release of captured Filipinos.	10) Juan Jerusalem (1945) – Took over after the death of Unida until his shooting.

==== Post-war to present ====
11) Napoleon Antazo (1945) – Appointed by the U.S. Army 43rd Infantry Division

12) Casimiro Ynares Sr. (1945–1946) – Appointed

13) Jose Pacis (1946–1951) – was Elected after the resumption of the election following Philippine independence in 1946. Presided over many constructions

efforts, including roads, wharves, and the public market.

[12] Casimiro Ynares Sr.(1952–1956)

[13] Jose Pacis (1957–1962)

14) Pedro Fineza (1963–1970)

15) Casimiro Ynares Jr. (1971–1986) – Due to the declaration of Martial Law by President Ferdinand Marcos, he remained as mayor owing to the lack of elections. He was deposed following the 1986 People Power Revolution.

(–) Mariano Cervo (1986–1988) – Officer-in-charge following the revolution.

[15] Casimiro Ynares Jr. (1988–1992)

16) Isidro B. Pacis (1992–1998)

17) Cesar M. Ynares (1998–2007)

18) Cecilio M. Ynares (2007–2016)

[17] Cesar M. Ynares (2016–2025)

19) Rhea R. Ynares (2025–present)

=== List of former vice mayors ===
==== Post-war to present ====
1) Pedro Fineza (1952–1956)	2) Antonio Antiporda (1956–1963)	3) Zoilo Estacio (1963–1986)	4) Joaquin Mendoza (1988–1992)	5) Amos Callanta (1992–1998)	6) Raul A. Miguel (1998–2007)	7) Reynaldo dela Cuesta (2007–2016)	8) Cecilio M. Ynares (2016–2025)	9) Russel C. Ynares (2025–present)

== Healthcare ==
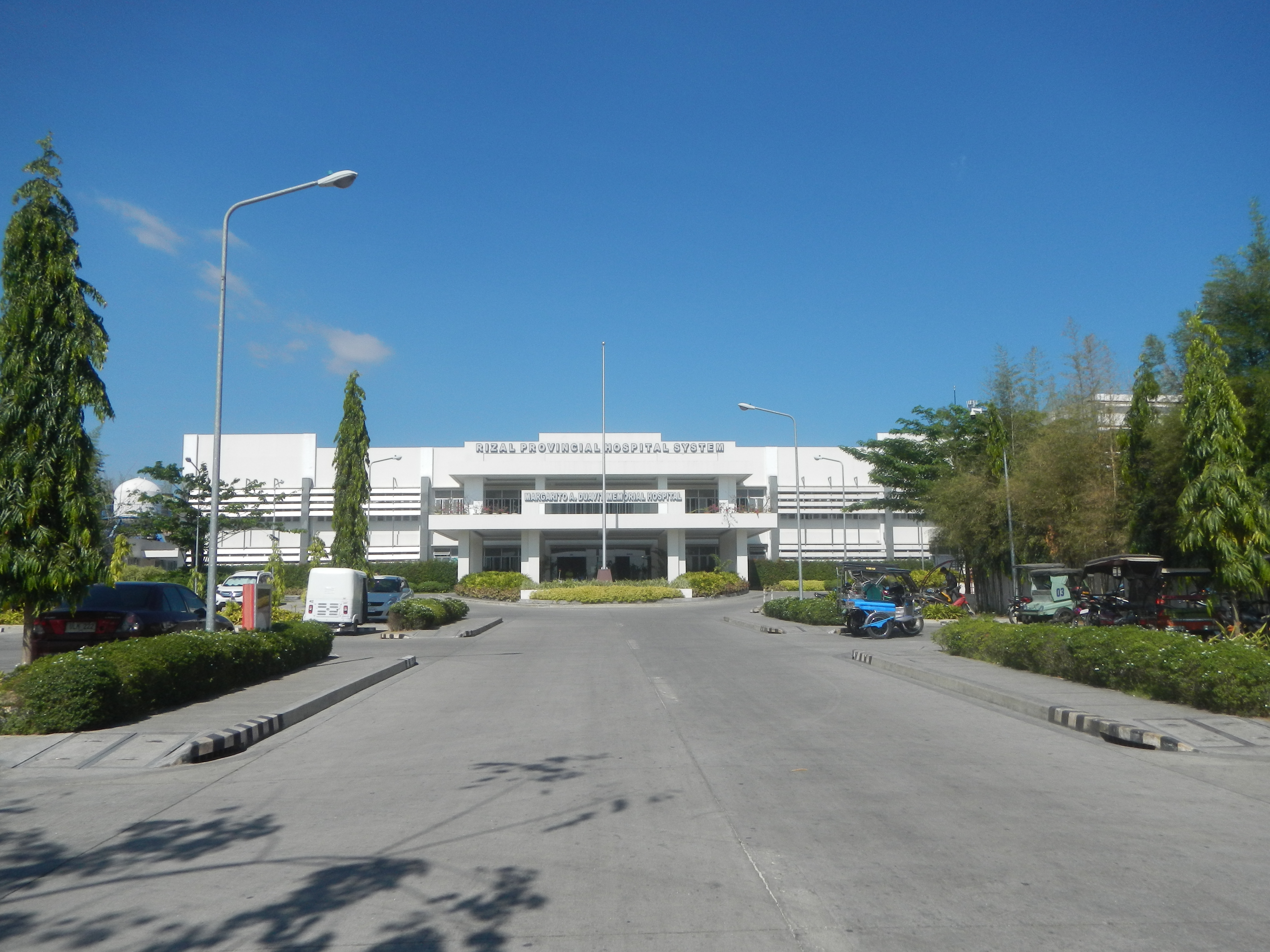
Margarito A. Duavit Memorial Hospital (Rizal Provincial Hospital System)

- Binangonan Municipal Community Health Center, Libis
- Binangonan Lakeview Hospital, Tagpos
- Pag-asa Hospital, Pag-asa
- Margarito A. Duavit Memorial Hospital – Rizal Provincial Hospital System, Binangonan (Annex)
- St. Bernard Infirmary and Multi-Specialty Clinic, Pantok

Barangay Health Centers are present in all 40 barangays

== Education ==
The Department of Education operates 36 elementary and 9 secondary schools in the municipality. A campus of the University of Rizal System is present. A Technical Education Skills Development Authority (TESDA) center established in the municipality provides technical and vocational courses. Over 50 private schools are also found within the municipality,

There are three schools district offices which govern all educational institutions within the municipality. They oversee the management and operations of all private and public, from primary to secondary schools. These are the Binangonan I Schools District, Binangonan II Schools District, and Binangonan III Schools District.

=== Public ===
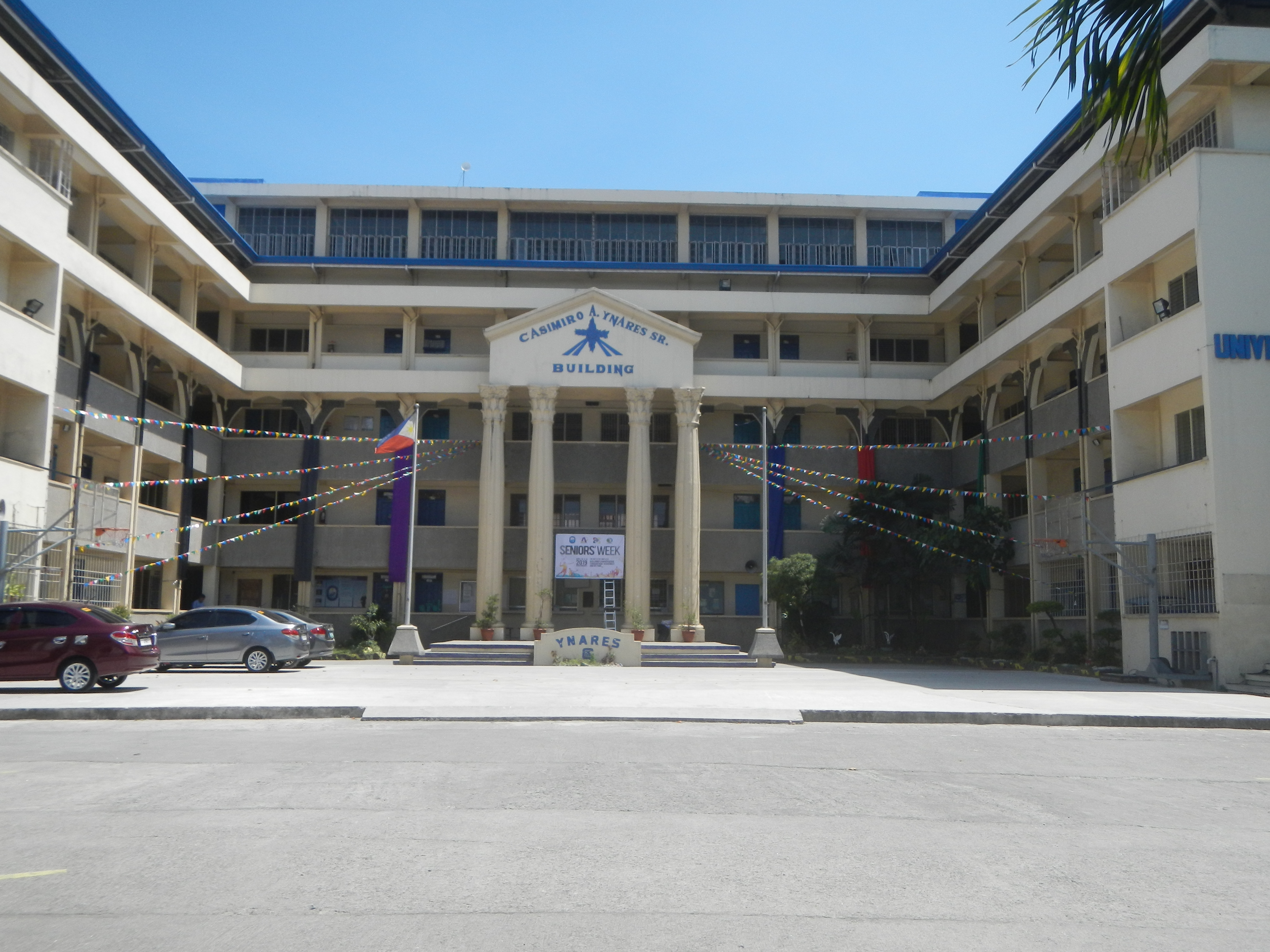
University of Rizal System - Binangonan Campus

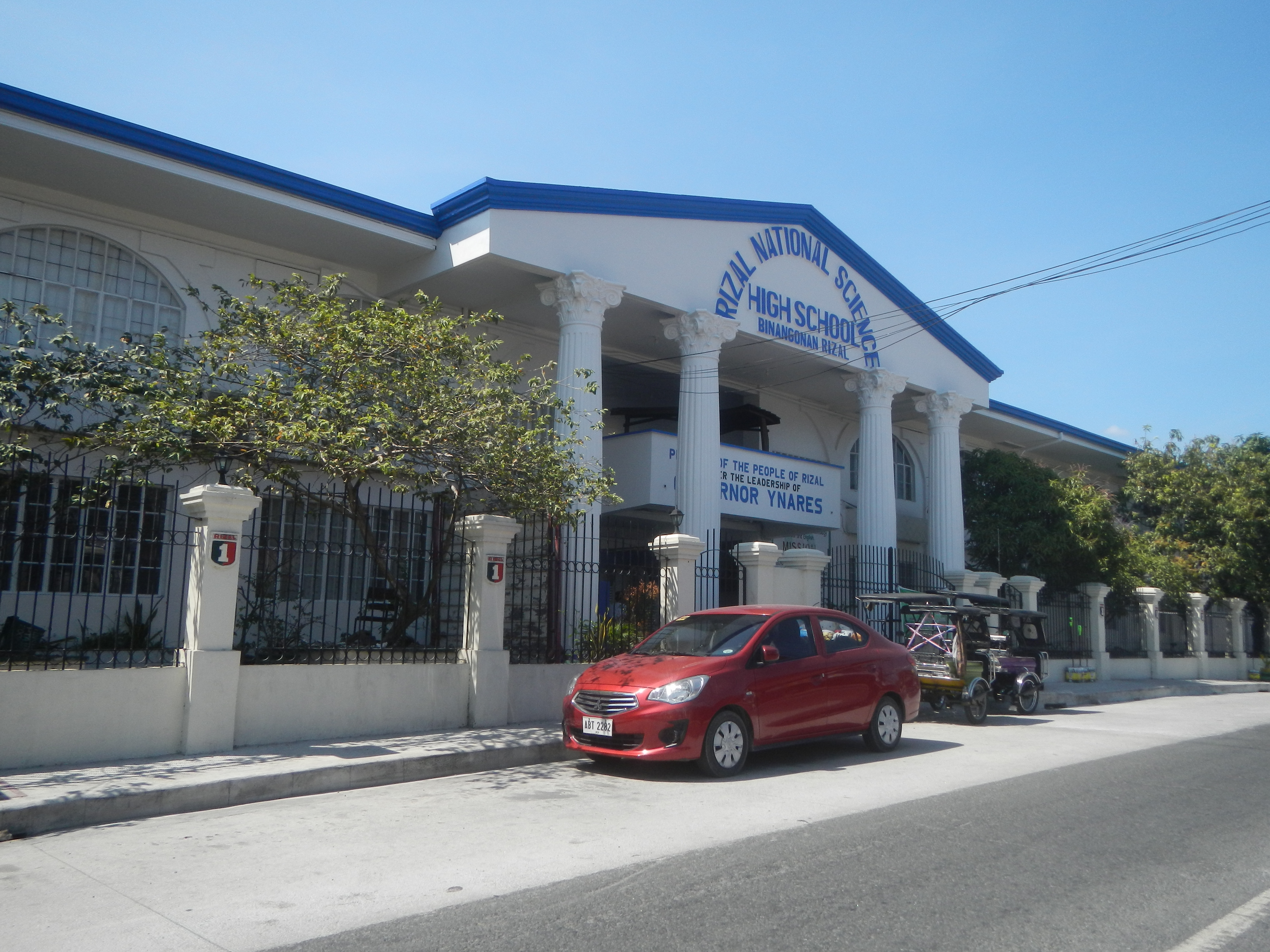
Rizal National Science High School

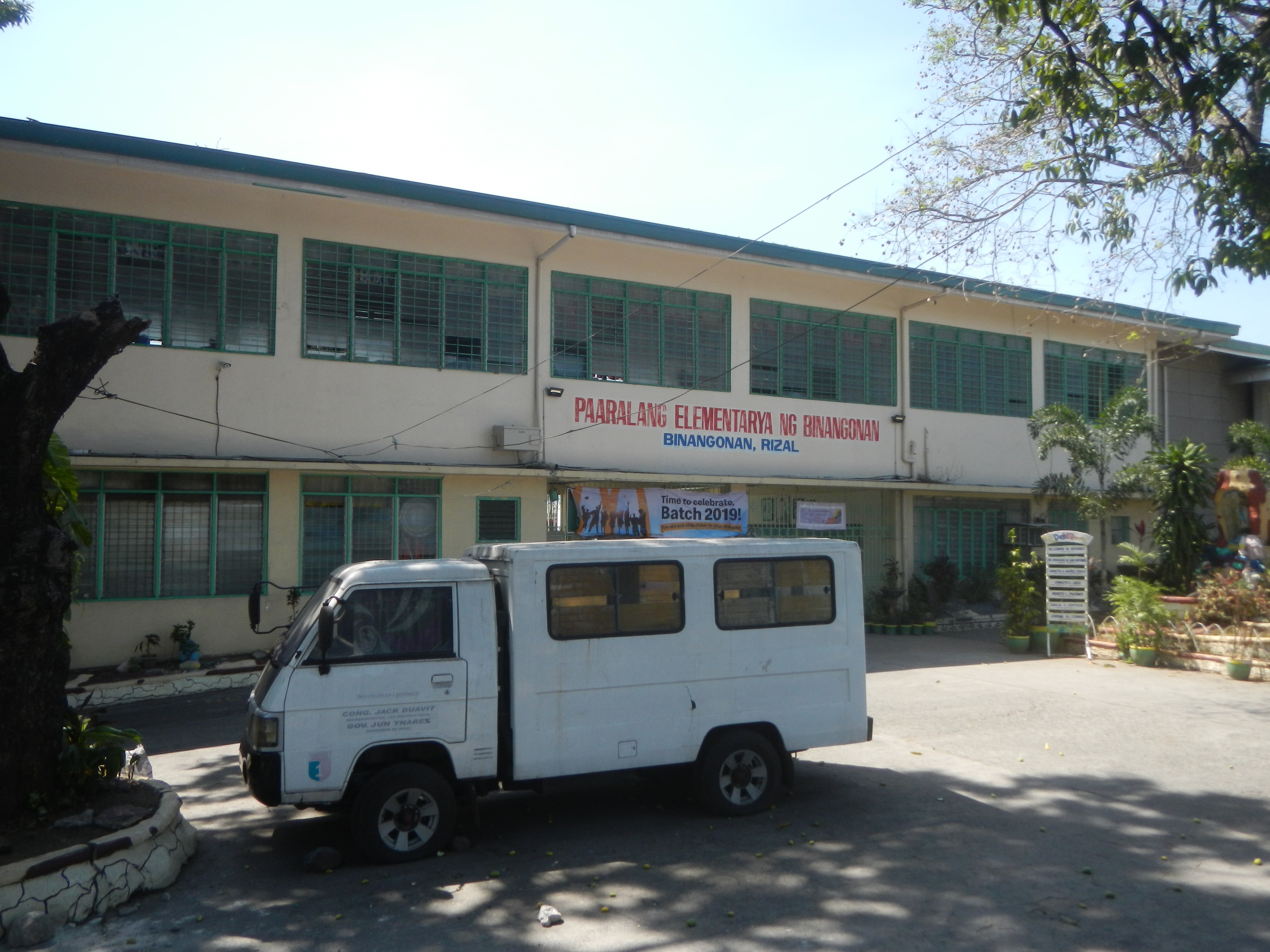
Binangonan Elementary School

Higher educational institution

- University of Rizal System – Binangonan Campus

Secondary schools

- Rizal National Science High School
- Vicente Madrigal National High School
- Guronasyon Foundation Inc. National High School
- Don Jose M. Ynares Sr. Memorial National High School
- Margarito A. Duavit Memorial National High School
- Mahabang Parang National High School
- Janosa National High School
- Talim National High School
- Pag-asa National High School

Primary and elementary schools

DISTRICT I

- Binangonan Elementary School
- Calumpang Elementary School
- Darangan Elementary School
- Mahabang Parang Elementary School
- Libis Elementary School
- Libid Elementary School
- Macamot Elementary School
- Tatala Elementary School
- Casimiro Ynares Elementary School
- Pila-Pila Elementary School

DISTRICT II

- Lunsad Elementary School
- Limbon-Limbon Elementary School
- Ithan Elementary School
- Kalinawan Elementary School
- Pipindan Elementary School
- Kasile Elementary School
- Bombong Elementary School
- Kinagatan Elementary School
- Kinaboogan Elementary School
- Bangad Elementary School
- Buhangin Elementary School
- Janosa Elementary School
- Kaytome/Gulod Elementary School
- Sapang Elementary School
- Malakaban Elementary School
- Pinagdilawan Elementary School
- Tabon Elementary School
- Talim Elementary School
- Banaba(Rayap) Elementary School

DISTRICT III

- Tayuman Elementary School
- Tagpos Elementary School
- Pag-asa Elementary School
- Doña Susana Memorial Elementary School
- Bilibiran Elementary School
- Mabuhay Homes 2000 Elementary School
- Don Jose Ynares Sr. Elementary School
- Sitio Mata Elementary School

=== Private ===
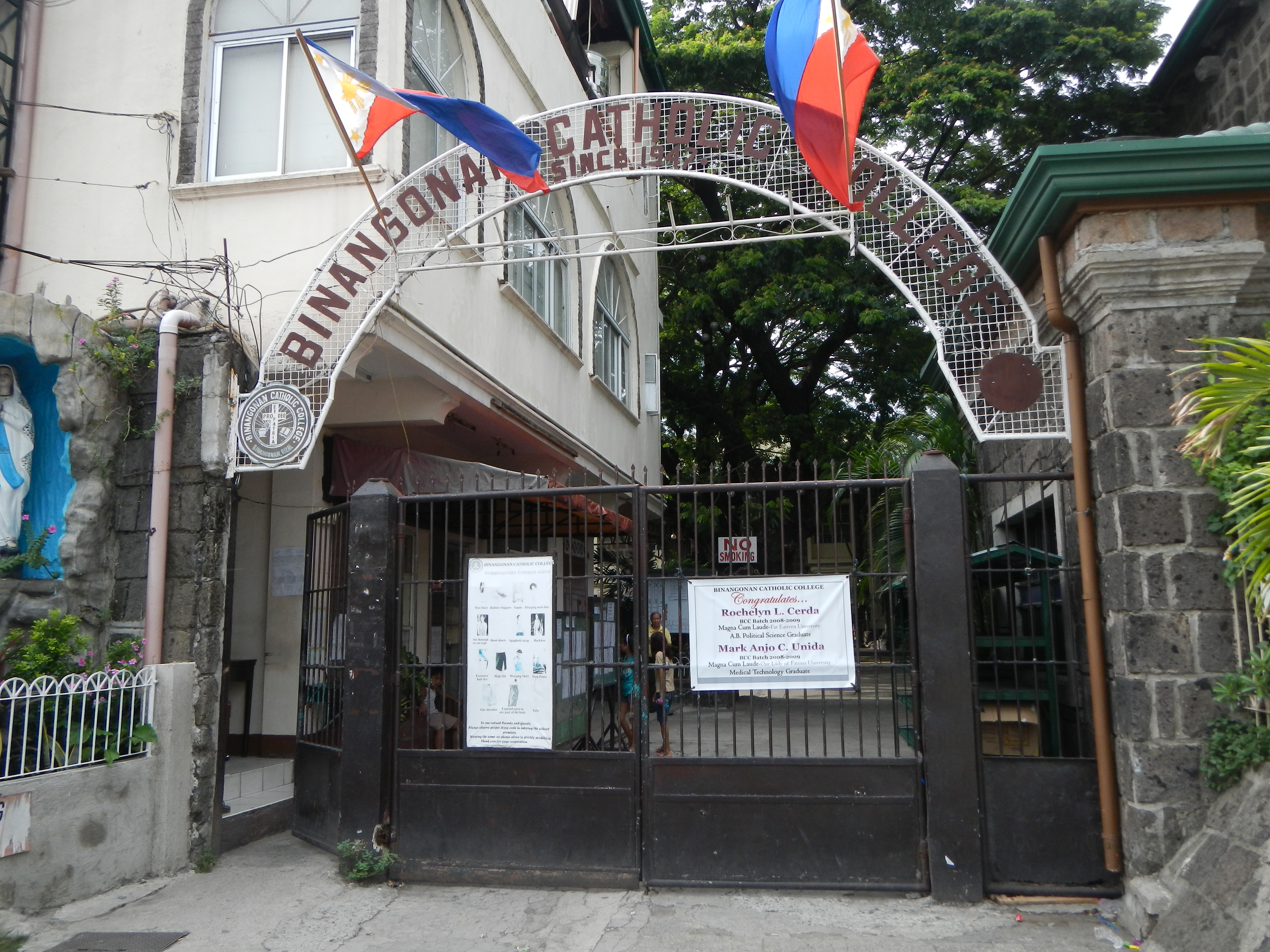
Binangonan Catholic College

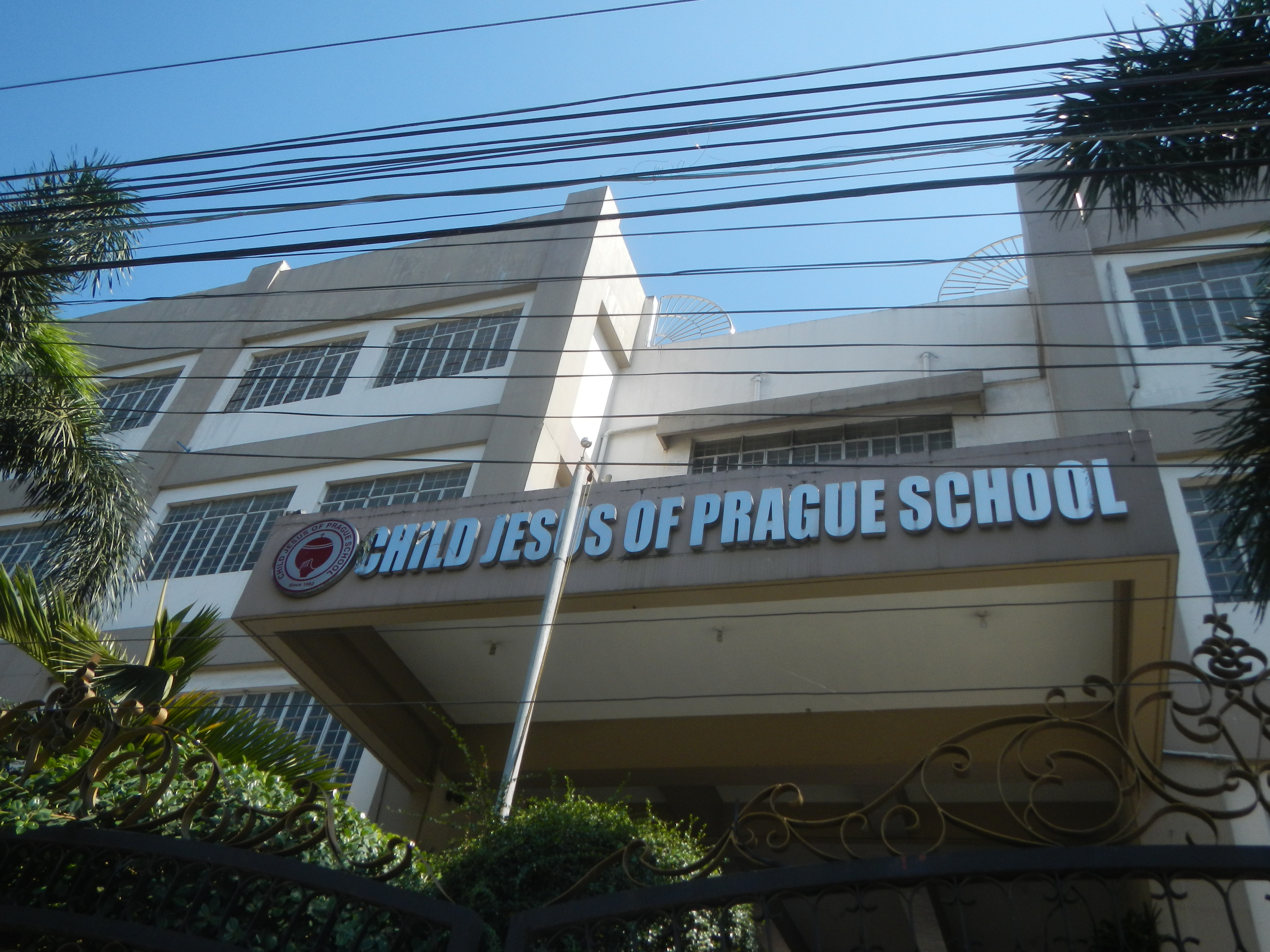
Child Jesus of Prague School - Batingan Campus

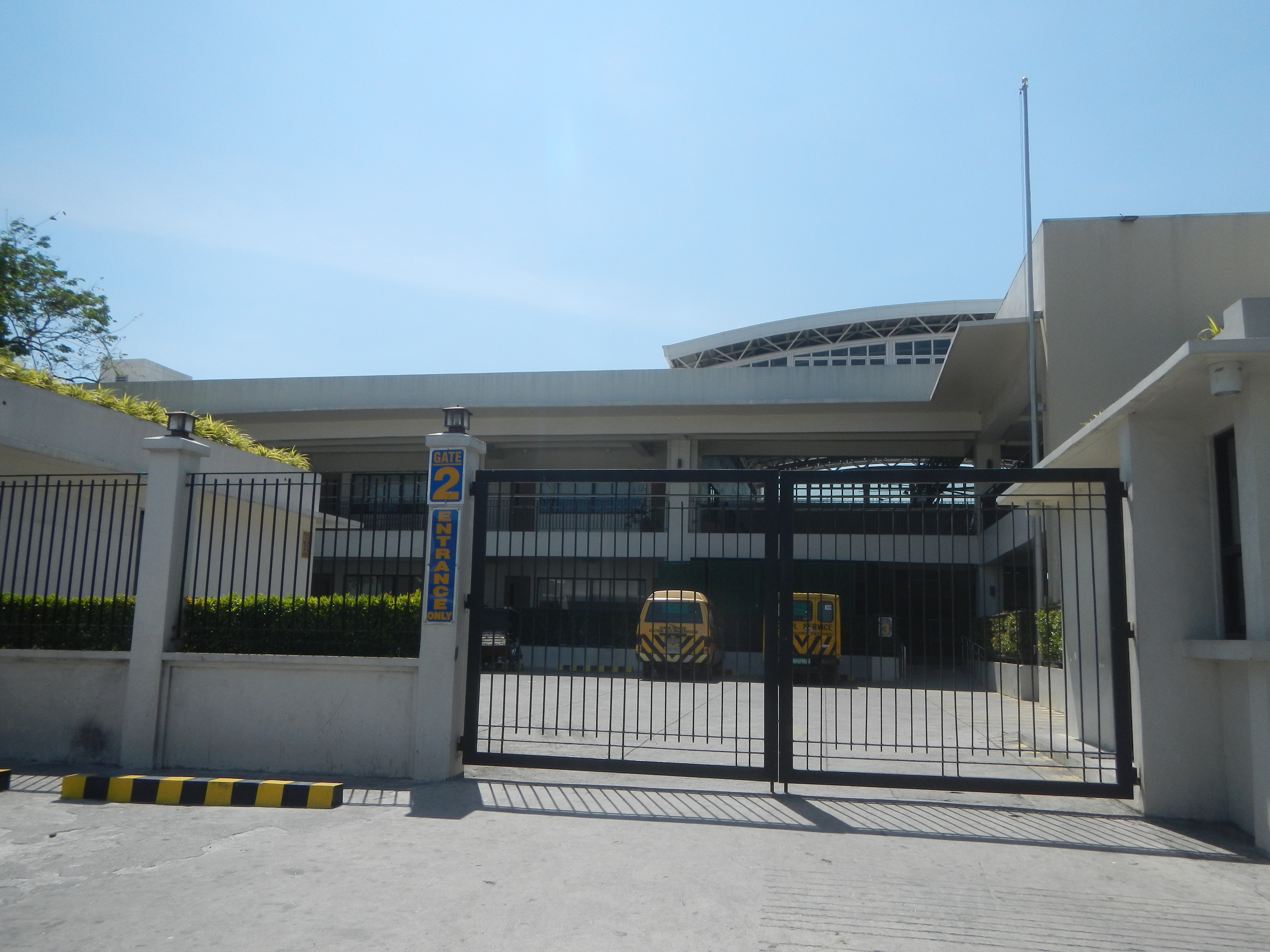
Child Jesus of Prague School - Calumpang Campus

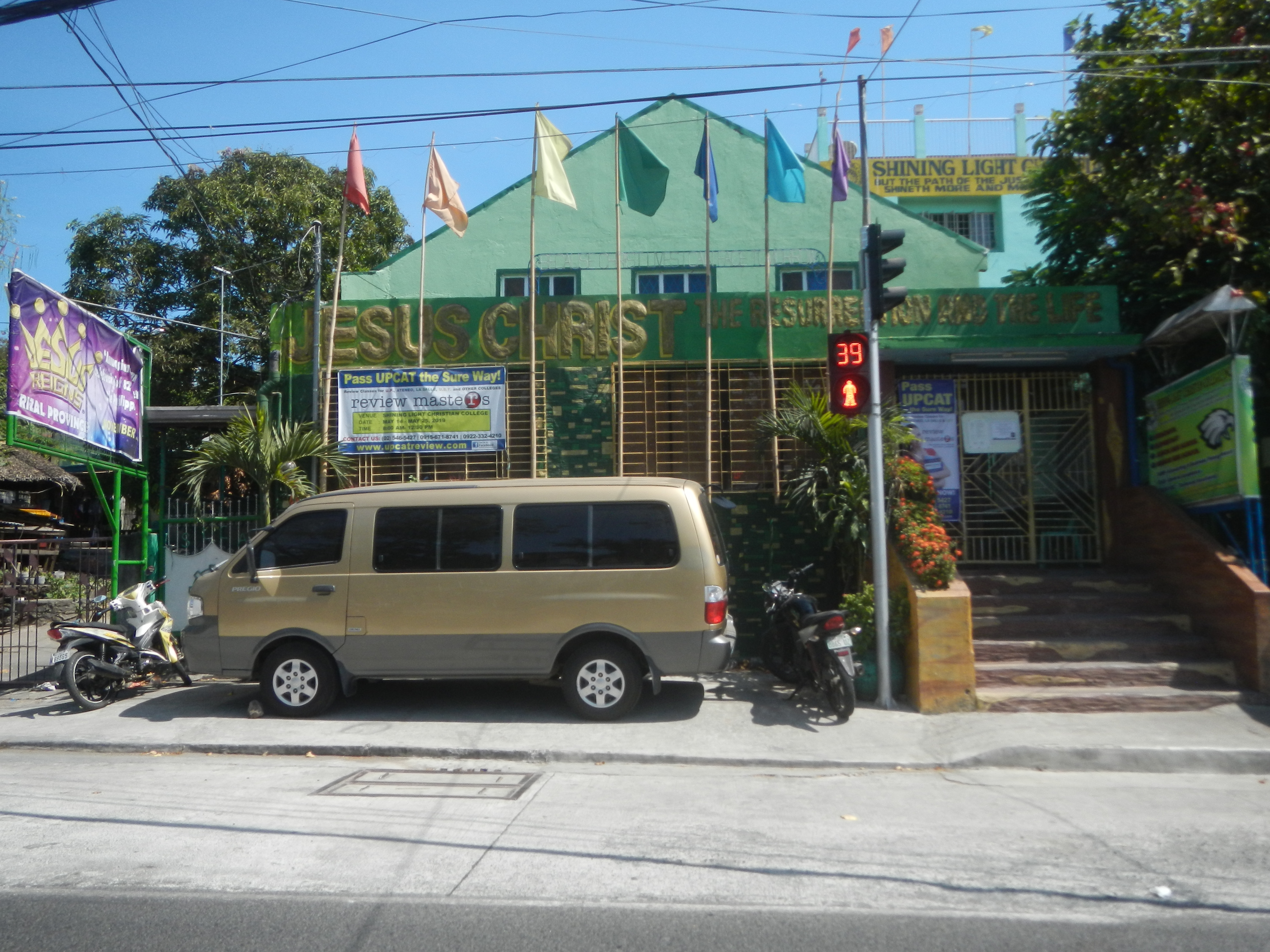
Shining Light Christian College

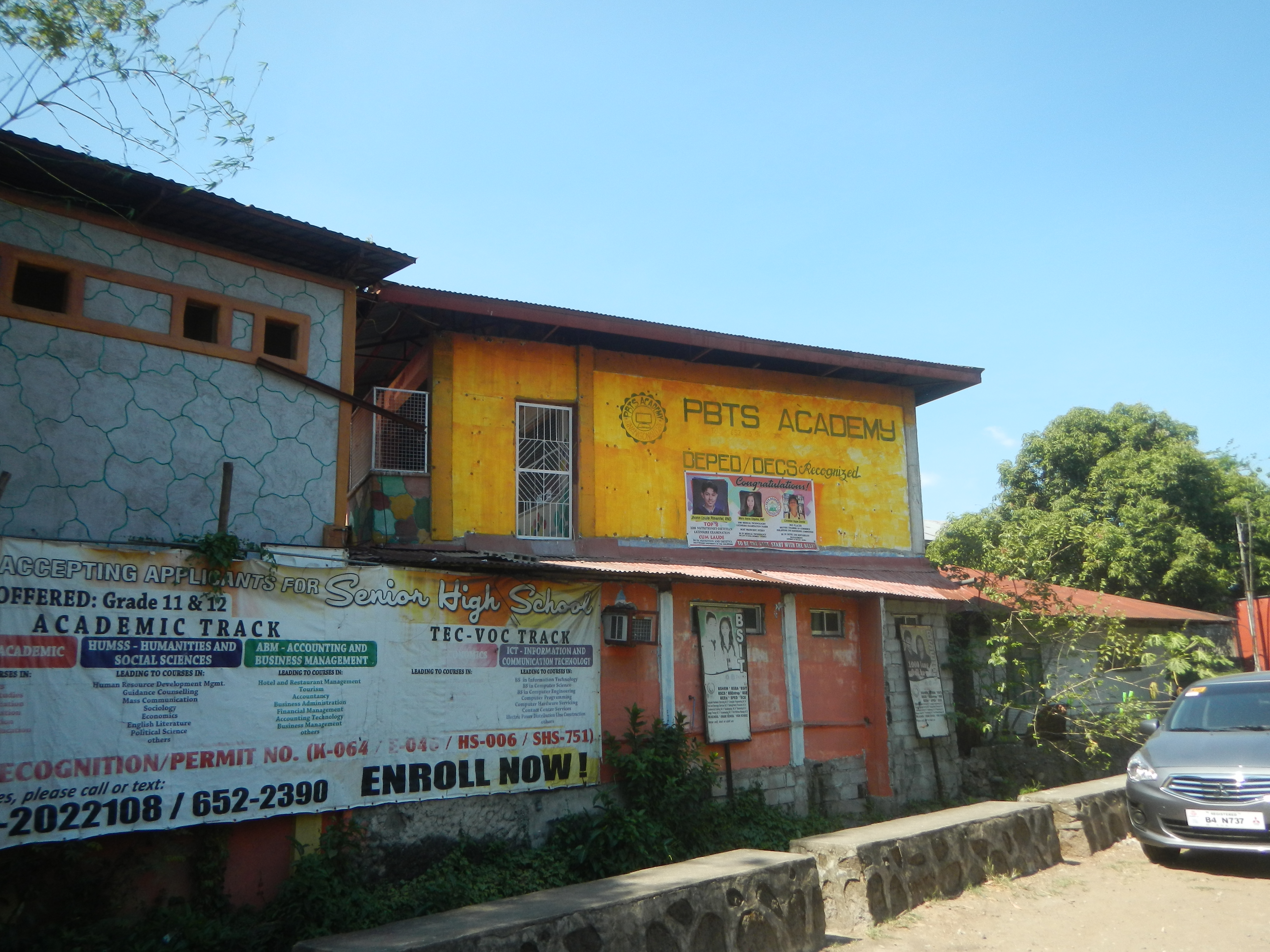
PBTS Academy

Higher educational institutions

- Binangonan Catholic College
- PBTS Academy
- ICCT Colleges - Binangonan Campus

Secondary schools

- Binangonan Catholic College
- Southwell School
- Genesis De Rizal School
- Tres Niños School Inc
- Bilibiran Christian School
- Child Jesus Prague School
- Child's Place Developmentally Appropriate Program School

Primary and elementary schools

- Binangonan Catholic College (Sta. Ursula Parish School)
- Right Step School of Learning
- Child's Place D.A.P School Inc.
- Bilibiran Christian School Inc.
- Palm Mary Private School.
- Little Children of Isaac
- SMA Lerning School(Pantok)
- SMA Lerning School(San Carlos)
- Binangonan Catholic College
- Child Jesus of Prague School Inc.
- Tres Ninos Learning Center Macee Academy
- Gain Knowledge Learning Center
- Shining Light Christian Academy
- Binangonan Garden of Learners
- Sanlex Divine Grace Academy
- PBTS Academy (Macamot)
- PBTS Academy (Pantok)
- PBTS Academy (Bilibiran)
- PBTS Academy (Tagpos)
- Niña Maria Learning Center
- Southwell School
- Raises Montessori Academy (Calumpang)
- Raises Montessori Academy (Pantok)
- Raises Montessori Academy (Pag-asa)
- Claremont School
- Zion Hills Christian Academy Inc.
- Knights & Archers Montessori
- Children's Brighter Educ.Learning
- Throne of Wisdom Christian Academy
- Remi Andrea School
- Sunnyvale Christian School
- Early Bird Learning Academy Inc.
- Maries Christian School
- Optimus Center for Development (Bilibiran)
- Optimus Center for Development (Tayuman)
- Angono Spring Academy School Inc.
- Bridge of Light Grace Christian Academy Inc.
- Growth for Knowledge Learning Center Inc.

== Cultural properties ==
Cultural Property wmph identifier (Note: wmph is an internal identifier used by Wikimedia Philippines to identify the monument. This is not an official identifier, and only shown temporarily in the templates until the government creates an updated complete list.)	Site name	Description	Province	City or municipality	Address	Coordinates	Image
	Santa Ursula Parish Church		Rizal	Binangonan, Rizal			Upload file
	Alvarez Clinic	Walls of the structure came from the stones used to build Santa Ursula Church.	Rizal	Binangonan, Rizal			Upload file
	Oldest Bakery in Binangonan	Has the oldest pugon dated 1960's and is still being used	Rizal	Binangonan, Rizal			Upload file

== Notable personalities ==
- Gloc-9, rap artist, musician, songwriter
- Joseph Marco, actor and model
- Valentin Mechilina, conductor and composer known for his Dalampasigan overture
- Jack Duavit, politician and businessman
- Consuelo Ynares-Santiago, former associate justice of the Supreme Court of the Philippines
- Mia Ynares, politician and businesswoman
- Ronnel Arambulo, fisherman and labor leader; 2025 senatorial candidate
