= Urso =

Urso is a surname. Notable people with the surname include:

- Camilla Urso (1840–1902), American violinist
- Francesco Urso (born 1994), Italian professional footballer
- Frank Urso (born 1954), American lacrosse player
- Giacinto Urso (1925–2024), Italian politician
- Joe Urso (born 1979), American football quarterback
- Júnior Urso (born 1989), Brazilian footballer
- Kirk Urso (1990–2012), American soccer player
- Phil Urso (1925–2008), American jazz tenor saxophonist and composer

== See also ==
- Ursi, another surname
