= Valea Ursului River =

Valea Ursului River may refer to the following rivers in Romania:

- Valea Ursului, tributary of the Cerna in Hunedoara County
- Valea Ursului, tributary of the Homorod in Brașov County
- Valea Ursului, tributary of the Lotrioara in Sibiu County
- Valea Ursului, tributary of the Novăț in Maramureș County
- Valea Ursului, tributary of the Păscoaia in Vâlcea County
- Valea Ursului, tributary of the Râul Târgului in Argeș County

== Others ==
- Valea Urșilor or Padina Urșilor, tributary of the Bârsa River
- Valea Urșilor, tributary of the Negraș in Prahova County

== See also ==
- Valea Ursului (disambiguation)
- Ursu River (disambiguation)
