= Ursu =

Ursu is a Romanian-language surname that may refer to:

Coat of arm of the Ursu family

- Adrian Ursu (b. 1969), Romanian journalist
- Andrei Ursu (b. 1993), previously known as Wrs, Romanian singer and dancer
- Anne Ursu (b. ?), American novelist and children's writer
- Doru-Viorel Ursu (1953–2024), Romanian politician and lawyer
- Gheorghe Ursu (1926–1985), Romanian construction engineer, poet, diarist and dissident
- Ion Ursu (b. 1994), Moldovan footballer
- Ionuț Ursu (b. 1989), Romanian footballer
- Melania Ursu (1940–2016), Romanian stage and film actress
- Neculai Alexandru Ursu (1926–2016), Romanian linguist, philologist and literary historian
- Sergiu Ursu (b. 1980), Romanian discus thrower
- Sonia Ursu-Kim (b. 1993), Romanian basketball player
- Valentina Ursu (b. ?), Moldovan journalist
- Vasile Ursu (b. 1948), Moldovan politician
- Vasile Ursu Nicola (1731–1785), Transylvannian revolutionary

== See also ==
- Ursu River (disambiguation)
- Urs (disambiguation)
- Urși (disambiguation)
- Ursa (disambiguation)
- Ursoaia (disambiguation)
- Valea Ursului (disambiguation)
