= University of Rizal System =

Public university system in Rizal, Philippines

- Sistemang Pamantasan ng Rizal (Filipino)
- Motto: Nurturing Tomorrow's Noblest
- Type: University
- Established: August 11, 2001
- President: Dr. Nancy Talavera-Pascual
- Faculty: est. 800
- Students: est. 30,000
- Location: Sumulong St, Morong, / J.P. Rizal St, Brgy. Sampaloc, Tanay, Rizal, Philippines; 14°33′25″N 121°22′11″E
- University Hymn: Awit ng Pamantasan
- Colors: Blue & White
- Sporting affiliations: STRASUC
- Mascot: URS GIANTS (Bernardo Carpio)
- Website: www.urs.edu.ph
- Location in Luzon Location in the Philippines

The University of Rizal System (URS) is a provincial state university with its network of colleges located in the Rizal province, Philippines. It operates multiple campuses, with the main campus being in Tanay, Rizal.

It is committed to produce graduates in agriculture, engineering, science and technology, culture and arts, teacher and business education through instruction, research, extension and production services in Region IV.

The university has expanded from its Main campus in Tanay to offer programs to students in the campuses: Angono, Antipolo, Binangonan, Cainta, Cardona, Morong, Pililla, Rodriguez, Tanay, and Taytay.

== History ==
The Rizal State College was established by Republic Act Number 1560 in 1956 as Rizal National Agricultural School (RNAS). It was chartered as a state college on June 24, 1983, by Batas Pambansa Bilang 662 known as Rizal College of Agriculture and Technology (RCAT). It was later named Rizal State College (RSC) making it the first state college of the province of Rizal. The college is about 67 kilometers from Metro Manila and accessible to towns of Rizal through Manila East Road through the newly opened sea level in the Sierra Madre Mountain range and is overlooking the Laguna Lake and the surrounding lake towns. The college has five extension campuses located in four of the thirteen towns of Rizal namely: Pililla, Rodriguez, Angono, Binangonan, and in the lone City of Antipolo which were established in 1991, 1995, 1996 and 2000, respectively.

The Rizal Polytechnic College (formerly Rizal Technological and Polytechnic Institute or RTPI) was established as a provincial high school in 1944. It is located in the heart of the town of Morong. By virtue of Batas Pambansa Bilang 469, the school was converted into a tertiary institution and on March 1, 1995, Republic Act Number 7933 converted RTPI into a state college known as Rizal Polytechnic College (RPC). The college has an extension campus in Cainta which was opened in 1999.

With the passage of Republic Act Number 9157 in June 2001 which lapsed into law on August 11, 2001, the University of Rizal System (URS) was established by integrating the Rizal State College, Rizal Polytechnic College and Rizal Technological University - Antipolo Annex.

== Organization and administration ==
The Board of Regents is the highest decision-making body of the University of Rizal System. It is composed of 12 members.

Title	Board Member	Remarks
Chairperson	HON. LILIAN A. DE LAS LLAGAS	Chairperson of the Commission on Higher Education
Member	HON. NANCY TALAVERA-PASCUAL	President, University of Rizal System
Member	HON. EMMANUEL JOEL J. VILLANUEVA	Chairperson, Senate Committee on Higher, Technical and Vocational Education
Member	HON. MARK O. GO	Chairperson, House Committee on Higher and Technical Education
Member	HON. EMELITA P. BAGSIT	Director, Department of Science and Technology Region IV
Member	HON. LUIS G. BANUA	Director, National Economic Development Authority Region IV-A
Member	HON. JOHN VINCENT G. GUILLERMO	President, Faculty Federation
Member	HON. JAN DEREK L. CHUA	President, URS Student Federation
Member	HON. JOSE P. CALMADA JR.	President, URS Alumni Federation
Member	HON. BETHALENE C. TONGOHAN	Private Sector Representative
Member	HON. JUAN MARTIN G. BARREDO	Private Sector Representative
Member	HON. CARINA C. PUBLICO	Board Secretary
