= Ursu River =

Ursu River may refer to:

- Ursu, a tributary of the Jiul de Vest in Hunedoara County, Romania
- Ursu, a tributary of the Schit in Neamț County, Romania

== See also ==
- Ursa River, a tributary of the Danube in Olt County, Romania
- Ursul (disambiguation)
- Ursoaia River (disambiguation)
- Pârâul Ursului (disambiguation)
- Valea Ursului River (disambiguation)
