= URS =

Urs may refer to:

- Urs, the death anniversary of a Sufi saint in South Asia
- Urs, Ariège, a commune in southern France
- Urs (Forever Knight), a fictional character from the television series Forever Knight
- Urs (given name)
- Urs (surname), an Indian surname
- D. Devaraj Urs (1915–1982), politician from the state of Karnataka, India

URS may refer to:

- The ISO 3166-1 3-letter country code for the former Soviet Union
- The IOC country code for the former Soviet Union
- United Regions of Serbia (Ujedinjeni regioni Srbije), a political coalition and later a political party in Serbia
- The University of Rizal System, Philippines
- Robert Schuman University (in French, Université Robert Schuman or URS)
- Roma Union of Serbia (Unija roma Srbije), a political party in Serbia
- URS Corporation, a U.S.-based engineering services firm
- User requirements specification, in systems engineering
- Universal Rating System for chess players

== See also ==
- Ursu (surname), a Romanian surname
