= 2021 Professional Chess Association of the Philippines season =

- League: Professional Chess Association of the Philippines
- Sport: Chess

2020 PCAP draft
- Top draft pick: Eugene Torre
- Picked by: Rizal Batch Towers

2021 season
- Season MVP: Oliver Barbosa (San Juan)
- All-Filipino Conference champions: Laguna Heroes
- All-Filipino Conference runners-up: Camarines Soaring Eagles
- Reinforced Conference champions: Iloilo Kisela Knights
- Reinforced Conference runners-up: San Juan Predators
- Open Conference champions: San Juan Predators
- Open Conference runners-up: Iloilo Kisela Knights

Seasons
- 2022 →

The 2021 Professional Chess Association of the Philippines season is the inaugural season of the Professional Chess Association of the Philippines (PCAP), a professional chess league in the Philippines. The season opened on January 12, 2021.

There were three conferences or separate tournaments under the 2021 season. The first conference was the All-Filipino Conference. It was followed by the Reinforced and Open Conferences.

== Teams ==
There are 24 teams in the PCAP as of the inaugural season divided into two geographic groups.

=== North ===
- Antipolo Cobras
- Laguna Heroes (Cabuyao)
- Cagayan Kings
- Caloocan Loadmanna Knights
- Isabela Knight Raiders
- Cavite Spartans (General Trias)
- Manila Indios Bravos
- Olongapo Rainbow Team 7
- Pasig City King Pirates
- Quezon City Simba's Tribe
- Rizal Batch Towers
- San Juan Predators

=== South ===
- Camarines Soaring Eagles
- Cebu City Machers
- Cordova Dutchess Dagami Warriors
- Iloilo Kisela Knights
- Iriga City Oragons
- Lapu-Lapu City Naki Warriors
- Mindoro Tamaraws
- Negros Kingsmen
- Palawan–Albay Queens' Gambit
- Surigao Fianchetto Checkmates
- Toledo City Chess Miners
- Zamboanga Sultans

== Team changes ==
=== Name changes ===
- The Palawan Queens' Gambit changed their name to the Palawan–Albay Queens' Gambit starting the Open Conference.

== All-Filipino Conference ==
The first tournament of the 2021 PCAP season was the All-Filipino Conference which began on January 16, 2021. The conference finals was held on April 3, 2021 which was contested by the Laguna Heroes of the Northern Division and the Camarines Soaring Eagles of the Southern Division. The Laguna Heroes clinched the title of PCAP's inaugural conference.

=== Regular season ===
==== Northern Division ====
Pos	Team	W	L	Pts	Qualification or relegation
1	Laguna Heroes	30	4	509	Qualification to the Division Quarterfinals
2	San Juan Predators	30	4	503.5	Qualification to the Division Quarterfinals
3	Caloocan Loadmanna Knights	29	5	461.5	Qualification to the Division Quarterfinals
4	Manila Indios Bravos	23	11	418.5	Qualification to the Division Quarterfinals
5	Rizal Batch Towers	23	11	384.5	Qualification to the Division Quarterfinals
6	Cavite Spartans	18	16	366	Qualification to the Division Quarterfinals
7	Pasig City King Pirates	17	17	372	Qualification to the Division Quarterfinals
8	Antipolo Cobras	13	21	303	Qualification to the Division Quarterfinals
9	Isabela Knight Raiders	10	24	266.5	
10	Olongapo Rainbow Team 7	12	22	289	
11	Cagayan Kings	5	29	235	
12	Quezon City Simba's Tribe	4	30	247	

Source: PCAP

==== Southern Division ====
Pos	Team	W	L	Pts	Qualification or relegation
1	Iloilo Kisela Knights	30	4	510	Qualification to the Division Quarterfinals
2	Camarines Soaring Eagle	29	5	470	Qualification to the Division Quarterfinals
3	Negros Kingsmen	28	6	472	Qualification to the Division Quarterfinals
4	Zamboanga Sultans	21	13	384	Qualification to the Division Quarterfinals
5	Toledo City Trojans	20	14	374.5	Qualification to the Division Quarterfinals
6	Lapu-Lapu City Naki Warriors	15	19	333	Qualification to the Division Quarterfinals
7	Mindoro Tamaraws	13	21	318.5	Qualification to the Division Quarterfinals
8	Cordova Dutchess Dagami Warriors	12	22	311.5	Qualification to the Division Quarterfinals
9	Surigao Fianchetto Checkmates	8	26	265.5	
10	Cebu City Machers	9	25	273.5	
11	Palawan Queens' Gambit	5	29	283.5	
12	Iriga City Oragons	4	30	218.5	

Source: PCAP

=== Playoffs ===
Scores within parentheses are the result of the Armageddon play tiebreaker in either sets which ended in the draw or both teams having the same aggregate score after all sets have been played.

==== Northern Division ====
Quarterfinals
1	Laguna Heroes	16	19	2
8	Antipolo Cobras	5	2	0
4	Manila Indios Bravos	12	10.5 (2)	2
5	Rizal Batch Towers	9	10.5 (1)	0
2	San Juan Predators	11.5	13.5	2
7	Pasig City King Pirates	9.5	7.5	0
3	Caloocan Loadmanna Knights	14.5	8.5	1 (2)
6	Cavite Spartans	6.5	12.5	1 (1)

Semifinals
1	Laguna Heroes	9	13	1 (3)
4	Manila Indios Bravos	12	8	1 (0)
2	San Juan Predators	9	10.5 (2)	1 (2)
3	Caloocan Loadmanna Knights	12	10.5 (1)	1 (1)

Finals
1	Laguna Heroes	12.5	10.5 (3)	2
2	San Juan Predators	8.5	10.5 (0)	0

Source: PCAP

==== Southern Division ====
Quarterfinals
1	Iloilo Kisela Knights	14	15.5	2
8	Cordova Dutchess Dagami Warriors	7	5.5	0
4	Zamboanga Sultans	8.5	9	0
5	Toledo City Trojans	12.5	12	2
2	Camarines Soaring Eagle	16.5	15.5	2
7	Mindoro Tamaraws	4.5	5.5	0
3	Negros Kingsmen	14	13.5	2
6	Lapu-Lapu City Naki Warriors	7	7.5	0

Semifinals
1	Iloilo Kisela Knights	10.5 (2)	15.5	2
5	Toledo City Trojans	10.5 (1)	5.5	0
2	Camarines Soaring Eagle	13	12	2
3	Negros Kingsmen	8	9	0

Finals
1	Iloilo Kisela Knights	9.5	11	1 (1)
2	Camarines Soaring Eagle	11.5	10	1 (2)

Source: PCAP

=== Grand finals ===
Set	North Division Team	Points	South Division Team
1	Laguna Heroes	14.5 – 6.5	Camarines Soaring Eagles
2	Laguna Heroes	9.5 – 11.5	Camarines Soaring Eagles
Aggregate	Laguna Heroes	1 – 1 (2 – 1)	Camarines Soaring Eagles

=== Awards ===
- Best Player of the Conference: Jem Garcia (Caloocan)
- Finals Most Valuable Player: Banjo Barcenilla (Laguna)

== Reinforced Conference ==
The Reinforced Conference will also be known as the Wesley So Cup for this season due to sponsorship of Filipino-American chess player Wesley So himself. Each team would be allowed to field one foreign player; who may either be a rated, lady, or senior player. The same format from the All Filipino Conference will be used for the Reinforced Conference which is scheduled to begin on May 15.

=== Foreign players ===
==== Northern Division ====
- (Malaysia) Jimmy Chee Meng Liew (Caloocan)
- (Uzbekistan) Alexei Barsov (Cagayan)
- (Singapore) Wagish Kumar Rai (Cavite)
- (Ukraine) Kirill Shevchenko (Laguna)
- (Indonesia) Yosef Taher (Manila)
- (Spain) Viktor Moskalenko (San Juan)
- (Singapore) Siew Kai Xin (Quezon City)
- (Singapore) Kevin Goh (Pasig)
- (Mongolia) Gombosuren Munkhgal (Pasig)

==== Southern Division ====
- (France) Marie Sebag (Camarines)
- (Thailand) Poompong Wiwatanadate (Cebu City)
- (Israel) Nitzan Steinberg (Cordova)
- (Armenia) Hovhannes Gabuzyan(Iloilo)
- (Vietnam) Phạm Lê Thảo Nguyên (Lapu-Lapu City)
- (Hungary) Fruzsina Szente-Varga (Mindoro)
- (United States) Steven Breckenridge (Negros)
- (India) Padmini Rout (Palawan)
- (Iran) Amir Bagheri (Toledo)
- (Brazil) Alexandr Fier (Zamboanga)

=== Regular season ===
==== Northern Division ====
Pos	Team	W	L	Pts	Qualification or relegation
1	San Juan Predators	31	3	499	Qualification to the Division Quarterfinals
2	Manila Indios Bravos	30	4	438	Qualification to the Division Quarterfinals
3	Laguna Heroes	26	8	471	Qualification to the Division Quarterfinals
4	Caloocan Loadmanna Knights	26	8	445.5	Qualification to the Division Quarterfinals
5	Antipolo Cobras	25	9	437	Qualification to the Division Quarterfinals
6	Pasig City King Pirates	20	14	380	Qualification to the Division Quarterfinals
7	Isabela Knight Raiders	17	17	313	Qualification to the Division Play-ins
8	Cagayan Kings	13	21	323	Qualification to the Division Play-ins
9	Cavite Spartans	10	24	294.5	Qualification to the Division Play-ins
10	Quezon City Simba's Tribe	7	27	259.5	Qualification to the Division Play-ins
11	Rizal Batch Towers	5	29	273.5	
12	Olongapo Rainbow Team 7	1	33	200	

Updated to match(es) played on unknown. Source: PCAP

==== Southern Division ====
Pos	Team	W	L	Pts	Qualification or relegation
1	Cordova Dutchess Dagami Warriors	28	6	460	Qualification to the Division Quarterfinals
2	Camarines Soaring Eagle	28	6	458.5	Qualification to the Division Quarterfinals
3	Iloilo Kisela Knights	27	7	501.5	Qualification to the Division Quarterfinals
4	Negros Kingsmen	23	11	404.5	Qualification to the Division Quarterfinals
5	Zamboanga Sultans	21	13	391.5	Qualification to the Division Quarterfinals
6	Toledo City Trojans	17	17	347.5	Qualification to the Division Quarterfinals
7	Palawan Queens' Gambit	10	24	300.5	Qualification to the Division Play-ins
8	Surigao Fianchetto Checkmates	10	24	281	Qualification to the Division Play-ins
9	Lapu-Lapu City Naki Warriors	9	25	290.5	Qualification to the Division Play-ins
10	Mindoro Tamaraws	9	25	287.5	Qualification to the Division Play-ins
11	Cebu City Machers	9	25	273	
12	Iriga City Oragons	6	28	235.5	

Updated to match(es) played on unknown. Source: PCAP

=== Play-ins ===
The seventh to tenth best finishing teams in the regular season qualify for the play-ins. The seventh place team play against the tenth place team, and the eight place team play against the ninth place team. The lower seeded teams needed to beat the higher seeded team to advance.

==== Northern Division ====
Play-ins					Quarterfinals
					1	San Juan Predators
8	Cagayan Kings	10	10	0	P2	Play-in 1 winner
10	Cavite Spartans	11	11	2

Play-ins					Quarterfinals
					2	Manila Indios Bravos
7	Isabela Knight Raiders	10	14.5	1	P2	Play-in 2 winner
10	Quezon City Simba's Tribe	11	6.5	1

Source: PCAP

==== Southern Division ====
Play-ins					Quarterfinals
					1	Cordova Dutchess Dagami Warriors
8	Surigao Fianchetto Checkmates	13	–	1	P2	Play-in 1 winner
10	Lapu-Lapu City Naki Warriors	8	–	0

Play-ins					Quarterfinals
					2	Camarines Soaring Eagle
7	Palawan Queens' Gambit	10	7	0	P2	Play-in 2 winner
10	Mindoro Tamaraws	11	14	2

Source: PCAP

=== Playoffs ===
Scores within parentheses are the result of the Armageddon play tiebreaker in either sets which ended in the draw or both teams having the same aggregate score after all sets have been played.

==== Northern Division ====
Quarterfinals
1	San Juan Predators	12	18	2
P2	Cavite Spartans	9	3	0
4	Caloocan Loadmanna Knights	5	11.5	1 (1)
5	Antipolo Cobras	16	9.5	1 (2)
2	Manila Indios Bravos	16	10	1 (3)
P1	Isabela Knight Raiders	5	11	1 (0)
3	Laguna Heroes	12	17.5	2
6	Pasig City King Pirates	9	3.5	0

Semifinals
1	San Juan Predators	13	11.5	2
5	Antipolo Cobras	8	9.5	0
2	Manila Indios Bravos	9	12	1 (1)
3	Laguna Heroes	12	9	1 (2)

Finals
1	San Juan Predators	12	13.5	2
2	Laguna Heroes	9	7.5	0

Source: PCAP

==== Southern Division ====
Quarterfinals
1	Cordova Dutchess Dagami Warriors	13.5	14	2
P2	Surigao Fianchetto Checkmates	7.5	7	0
4	Negros Kingsmen	13.5	12	2
5	Zamboanga Sultans	7.5	9	0
2	Camarines Soaring Eagle	14.5	17.5	2
P1	Mindoro Tamaraws	6.5	3.5	0
3	Iloilo Kisela Knights	15	15	2
6	Toledo City Trojans	6	6	0

Semifinals
1	Cordova Dutchess Dagami Warriors	13.5	12	2
4	Negros Kingsmen	7.5	9	0
2	Camarines Soaring Eagle	10.5 (2)	8.5	1 (1)
3	Iloilo Kisela Knights	10.5 (1)	12.5	1 (2)

Finals
1	Cordova Dutchess Dagami Warriors	8	5.5	0
3	Iloilo Kisela Knights	13	15.5	2

Source: PCAP

=== Third place playoff ===
Set	North Division Team	Points	South Division Team
1	Laguna Heroes	10.5 – 10.5	Cordova Dutchess Dagami Warriors
Result	Laguna Heroes	1 – 1 (2 – 1)	Cordova Dutchess Dagami Warriors

=== Grand finals ===
Set	North Division Team	Points	South Division Team
1	San Juan Predators	8 – 13	Iloilo Kisela Knights
2	San Juan Predators	9.5 – 11.5	Iloilo Kisela Knights
Aggregate	San Juan Predators	0 – 2	Iloilo Kisela Knights

== Open Conference ==
Foreign teams were eligible to compete as guests for this tournament. The conference was also known as the PCAP/San Miguel Corporation-Ayala Land Premier Cup due to sponsorship reasons. The San Juan Predators won the conference.

=== Teams ===
The following are guest teams for the Open Conference.

Local guest teams

- CCE Sunrays
- Davao Executive Chess Society
- Pampanga Checkers
- Philippine national para chess team

Foreign guest teams

- (China) Peng Cheng Dragons
- (Malaysia) Penang Blue Panthers
- (Singapore) Team SinQGApore
- (Thailand) Double Bishop Bangkok

== All-Star Game ==
An All-Star Game was held on May 2, 2021 following the conclusion of the All Filipino Conference which was contested by selection teams representing the North and South Divisions. The composition of the teams were determined through vote by both fans and the league's players and coaches. The Northern All Stars won over their Southern counterparts through an Armageddon tiebreaker.

Set	Team 1	Points	Team 2
1	Northern All Stars	23 – 17	Southern All Stars
2	Northern All Stars	19 – 23	Southern All Stars
Aggregate	Northern All Stars	1 – 1 (3 – 2)	Southern All Stars

== Awards ==
- Season MVP – Oliver Barbosa (San Juan)
- Mythical Seven
  - Top-rated players
    - Oliver Barbosa (San Juan)
    - Jem Garcia (Caloocan)
  - Lady player – Jan Jodilyn Fronda (San Juan)
  - Senior player – Cris Ramayrat (Pasig / Manila)
  - Homegrown players
    - John Paul Gomez (Laguna)
    - John Michael Silvederio (Iloilo)
    - Fritz Bryan Porras (Iloilo)
- Team Sportsmanship Award – Surigao Fianchetto Checkmates
