= 2022 Professional Chess Association of the Philippines season =

- League: Professional Chess Association of the Philippines
- Sport: Chess

2022 PCAP draft
- Top draft pick: Onofre Espiritu
- Picked by: Iriga City Oragons

2022 season
- All-Filipino Conference champions: San Juan Predators
- Reinforced Conference champions: Pasig City King Pirates
- Open Conference champions: Pasig City King Pirates

Seasons
- ← 2021 2023 →

The 2022 Professional Chess Association of the Philippines season will be the second season of the Professional Chess Association of the Philippines (PCAP), a professional chess league in the Philippines.

The season will open on January 22, 2022, with the All-Filipino Conference.

== Teams ==
There are 24 teams in the PCAP as of the second season divided into two geographic groups.

=== North ===
- Laguna Heroes (Cabuyao)
- Cagayan Kings
- Caloocan Loadmanna Knights
- Isabela Knights of Alexander
- Cavite Spartans (General Trias)
- Manila Indios Bravos
- Mindoro Tamaraws
- Olongapo Rainbow Team 7
- Pasig City King Pirates
- Quezon City Simba's Tribe
- Rizal Batch Towers
- San Juan Predators

=== South ===
- Cagayan De Oro
- Camarines-Iriga
- Cebu City Machers
- Davao Chess Eagles
- Iloilo Kisela Knights
- Negros Kingsmen
- Pagadian PCL
- Palawan Queens' Gambit
- Surigao Fianchetto Checkmates
- Tacloban Vikings
- Toledo City Trojans
- Zamboanga Sultans

== Team changes ==
Three teams which entered the 2021 season did not enter:

1. Antipolo Cobras
2. Cordova Dutchess Dagami Warriors (leave of absence)
3. Lapu-Lapu City Naki Warriors (leave of absence)

Four teams entered this season

1. Team Cagayan de Oro
2. Davao Chess Eagles (2021 Open Conference guest team)
3. Tacloban Vikings
4. Pagadian PCL (new team in 2022 PCAP 2nd Conference-Wesley So Cup)

Guest Teams (2022 Open Conference)

1. Pasig Grassroots Knights (Pasig Juniors)
2. Philippine Executive Chess Association

One team moved to another division

1. Mindoro Tamaraws (South to North)

=== Name changes ===
- The Toledo City Chess Miners changed their name to the Toledo City Trojans before the start of the season.
- The Davao Chess Wizards changed their name to the Davao Chess Eagles before the start of the season.
- The Camarines Soaring Eagles & Iriga City Oragons were merged into Camarines-Iriga before the start of the 2022 PCAP 2nd Conference.
