= Taytay National High School =

Public high school in Taytay, Rizal, Philippines

Taytay Integrated School

Location
- Zloty St., Meralco Village, Barangay San Juan; Taytay, Rizal; Philippines
- 14°33′19″N 121°08′53″E

Information
- Type: Public
- Established: 1994
- Grades: 7 to 12
- Language: English and Filipino
- Color: Burnt Orange

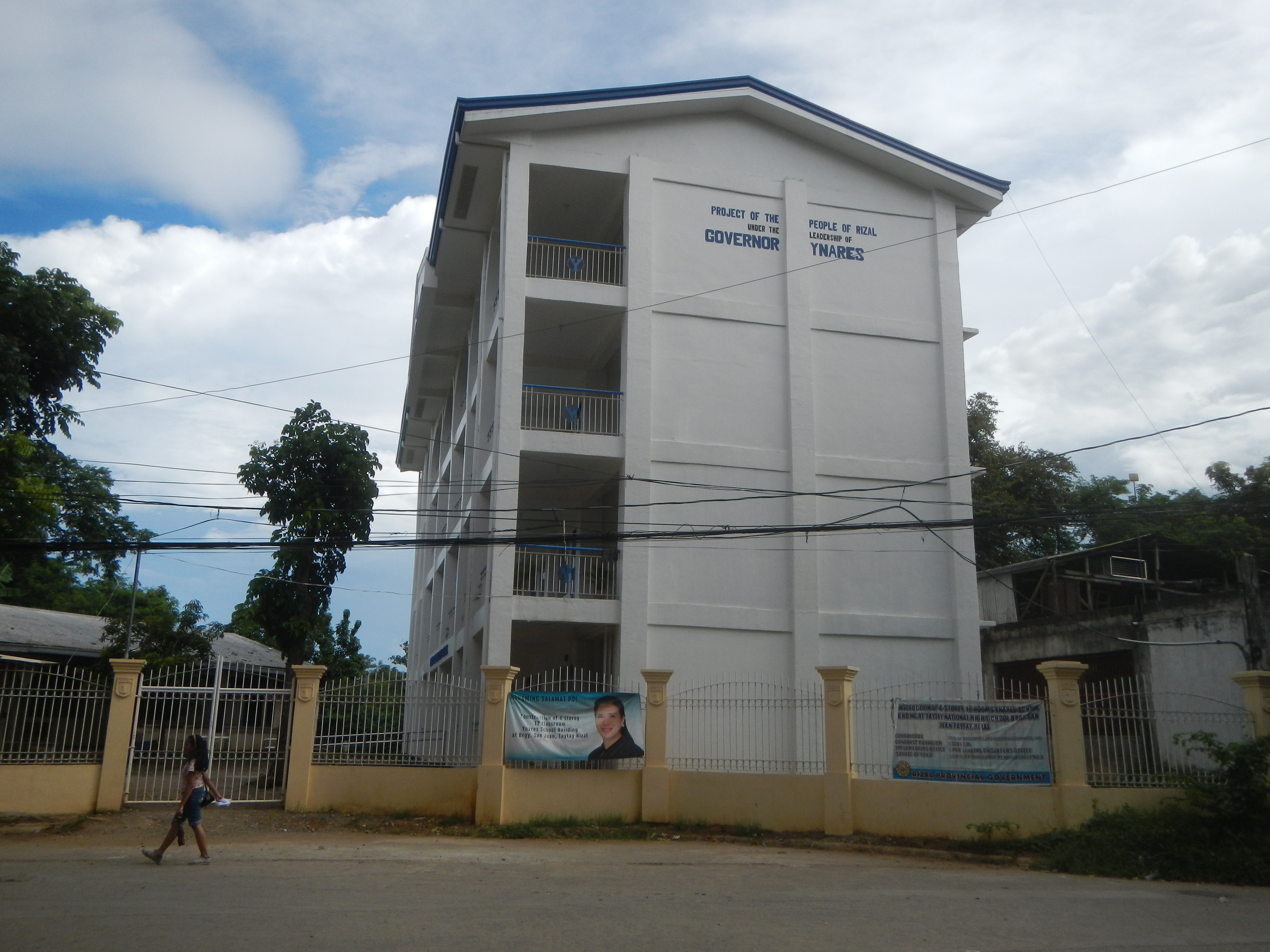
Taytay Integrated School

Taytay Integrated School (formerly known as Taytay National High School) is a public high school in Taytay, Rizal, Philippines. The school situated at Zloty St., Meralco Village of Barangay San Juan, was established in 1994.

== Programs in Taytay Integrated School ==
Special Science Program, a class from Junior High School that focuses on nurturing students ability and skills in science. 'Special Program in the Arts', a special program for students that wants to develop artistic skills. Regular Class, classes of Junior High School. Senior High School Programs'', the school offers multiple track and cluster in SHS Curriculum.

== Other Public Secondary Schools ==
Taytay Integrated School - TIS extensions consist of the following schools: Antonio C. Esguerra Memorial National High School, Benjamin B. Esguerra Memorial National High School, Casimiro A. Ynares Sr. Memorial National High School, Muzon National High School, Manuel I. Santos Integrated School and Simona National High School in random naming.

== Transition to the Integrated School Institution ==
In 2025, Taytay Integrated School announced their name change from their former name Taytay National High School for the first time in 30 years after their 1995 transition from their original name, Taytay Municipal High School. This change is a part of DepEd's Memorandum No. 184, Series of 2023's inclusion of schools to be part under the Special Program for Science, Technology, Engineering and Mathematics (SPSTEM), along with some of the mentioned school. In which, the Legislative Index of Municipality of Taytay has approved the change under the Resolution No. 413, Series of 2024 to support the transition of the campus, establishing the institution as Taytay Integrated School (TIS). With the change, the campus has introduced the Senior High School Curriculum as a part of the transition.
