= Taytay, Rizal =

Municipality in Calabarzon, Philippines

Taytay
- Municipality
- Municipality of Taytay
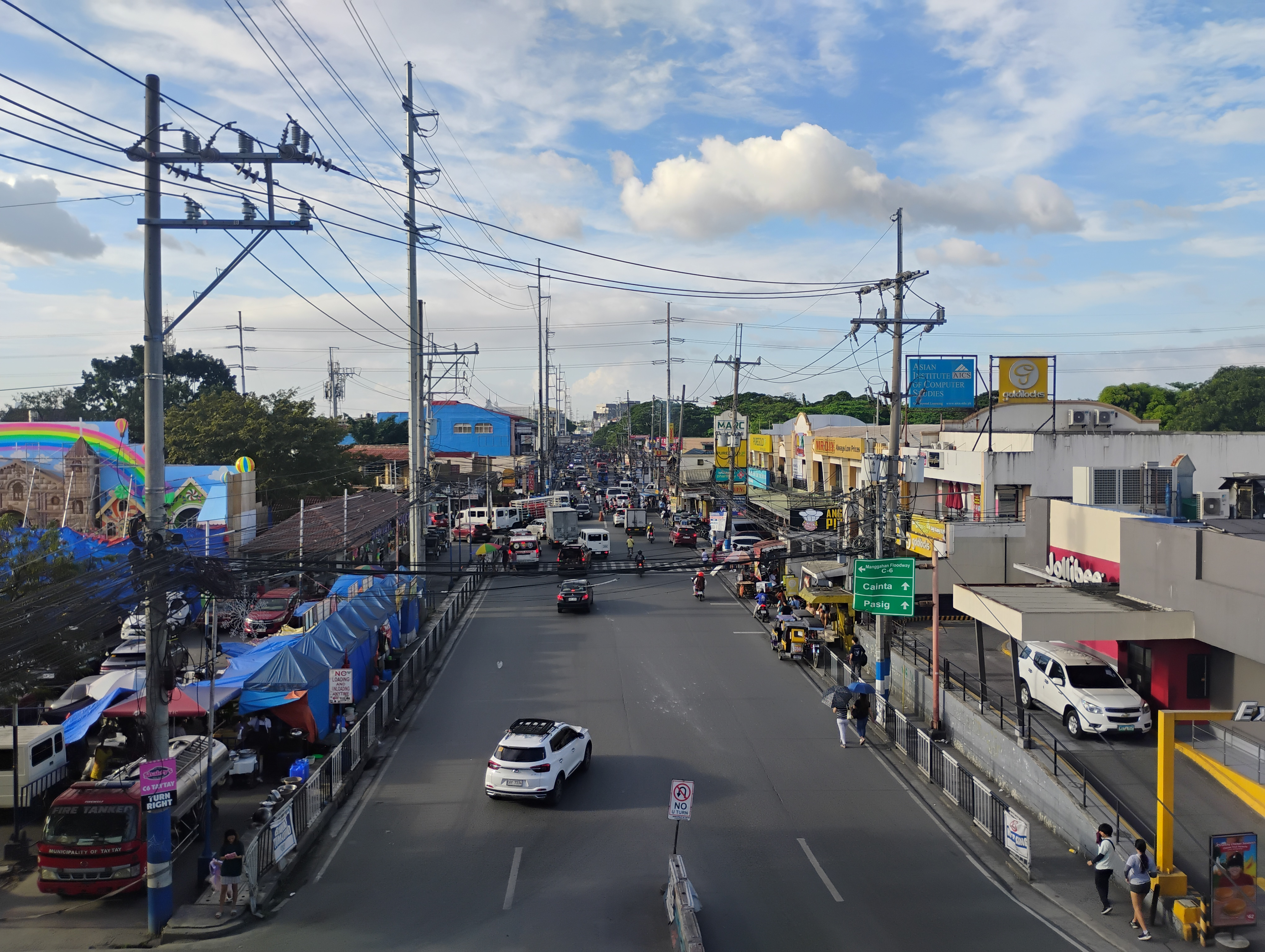
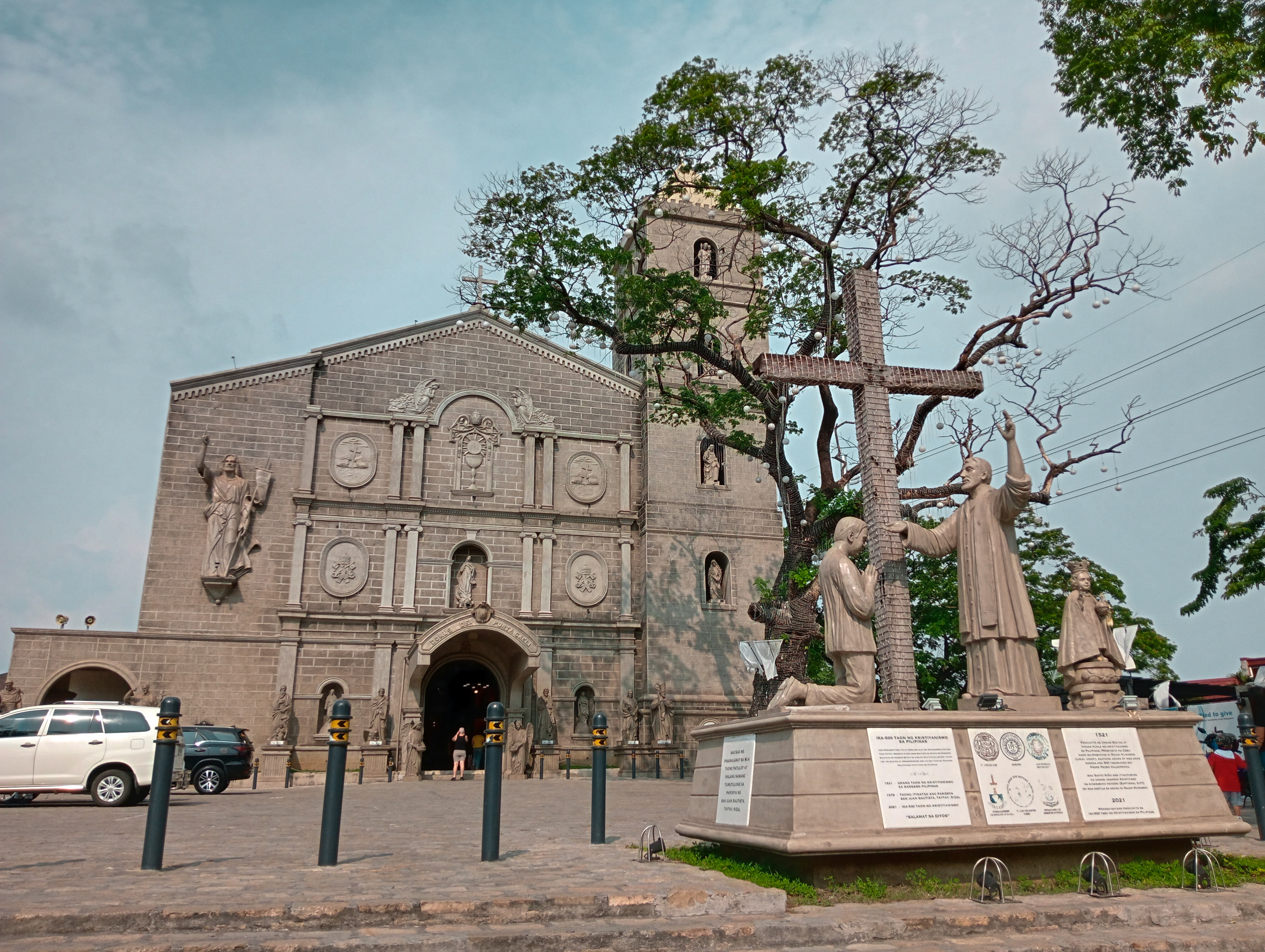
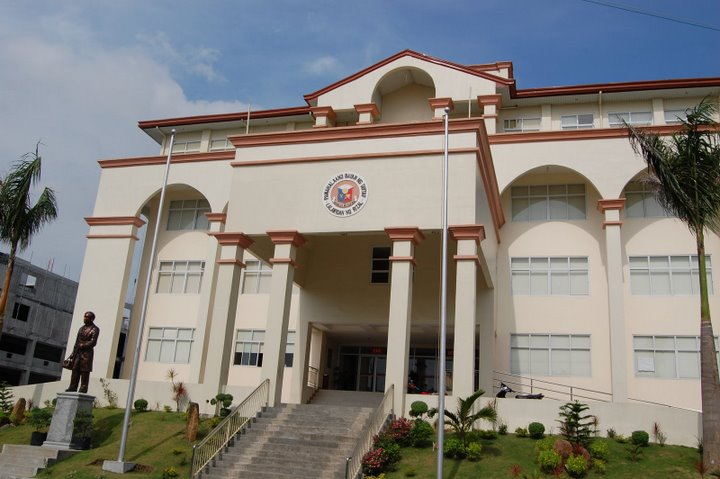
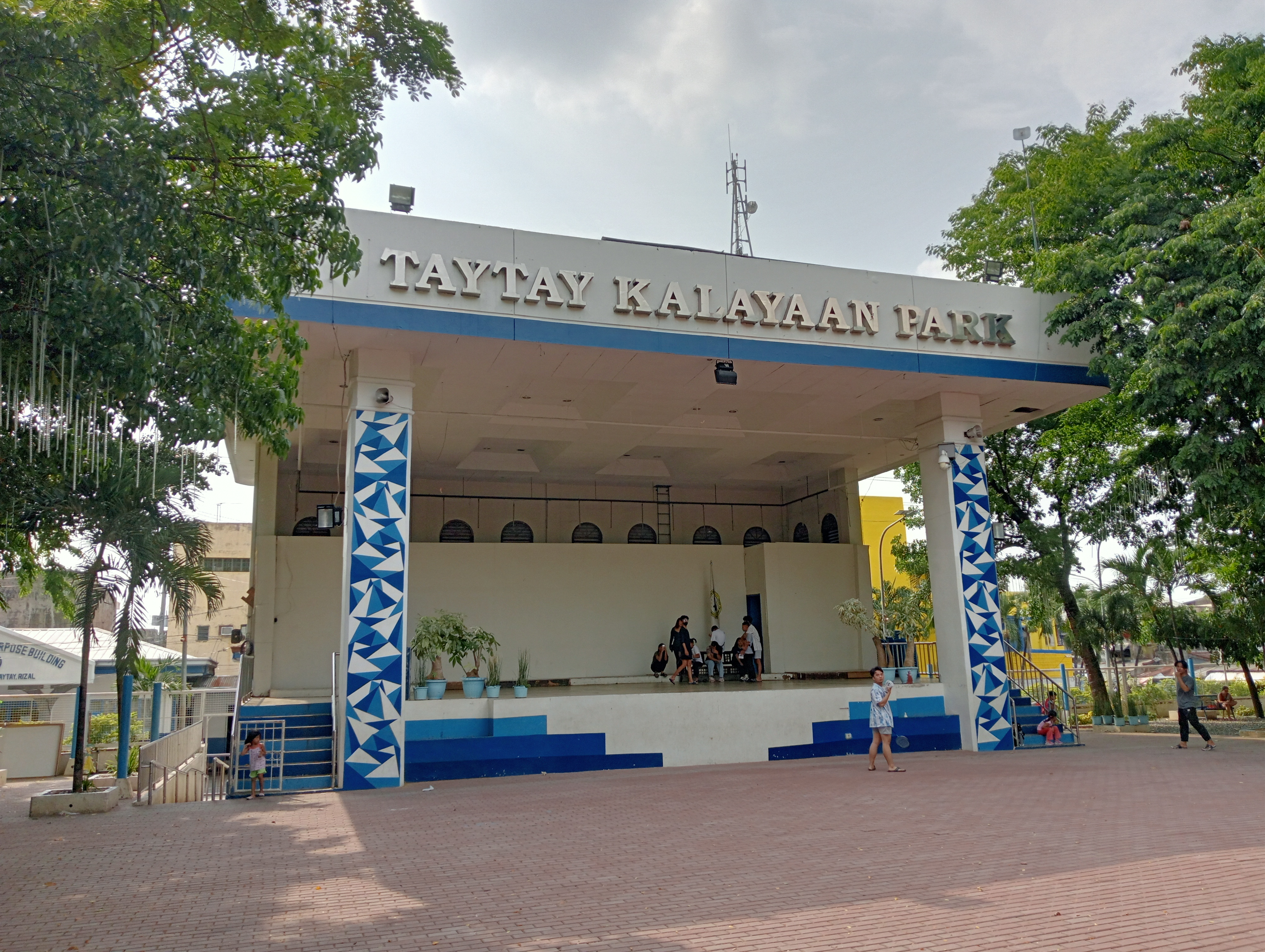
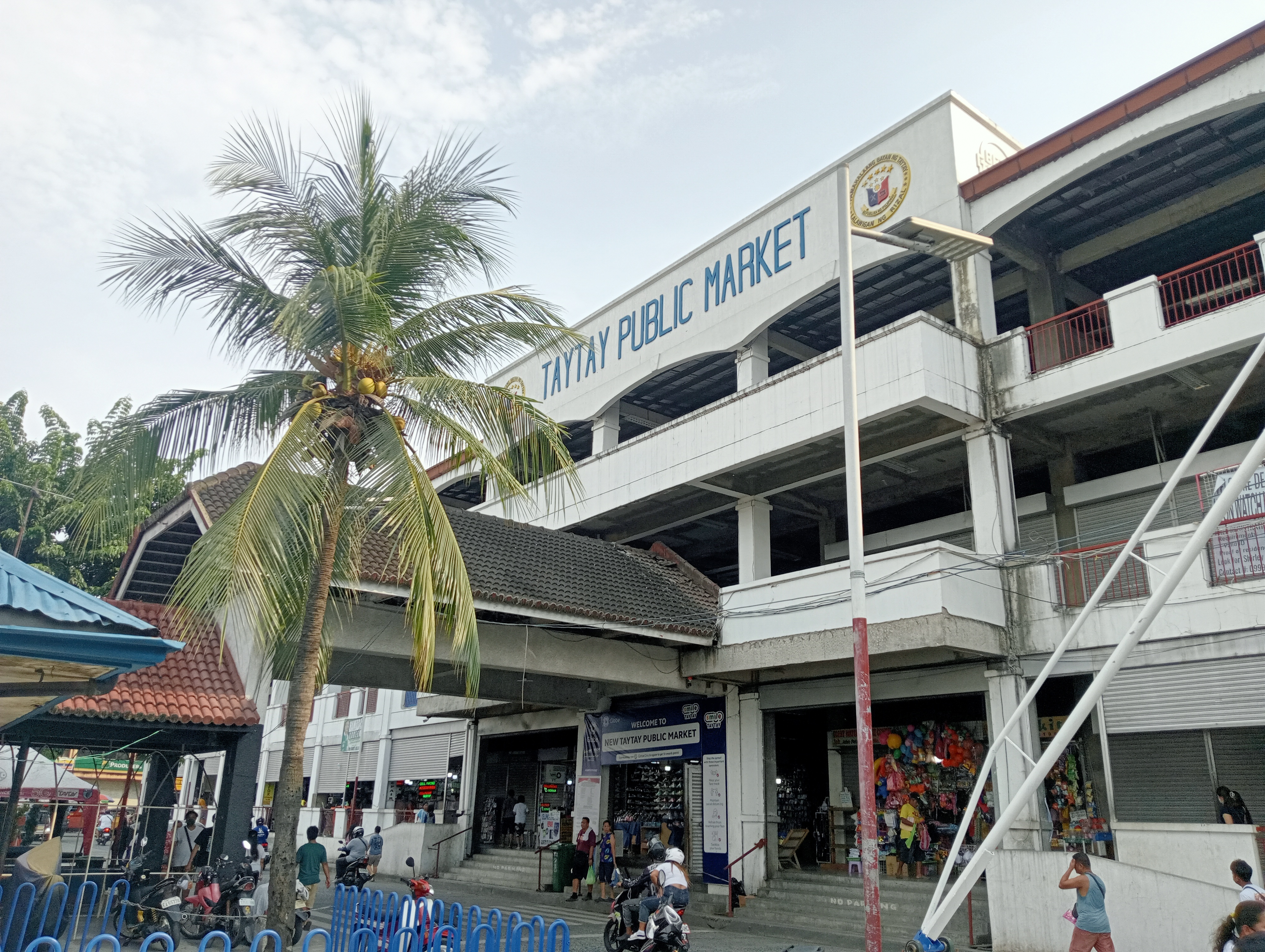
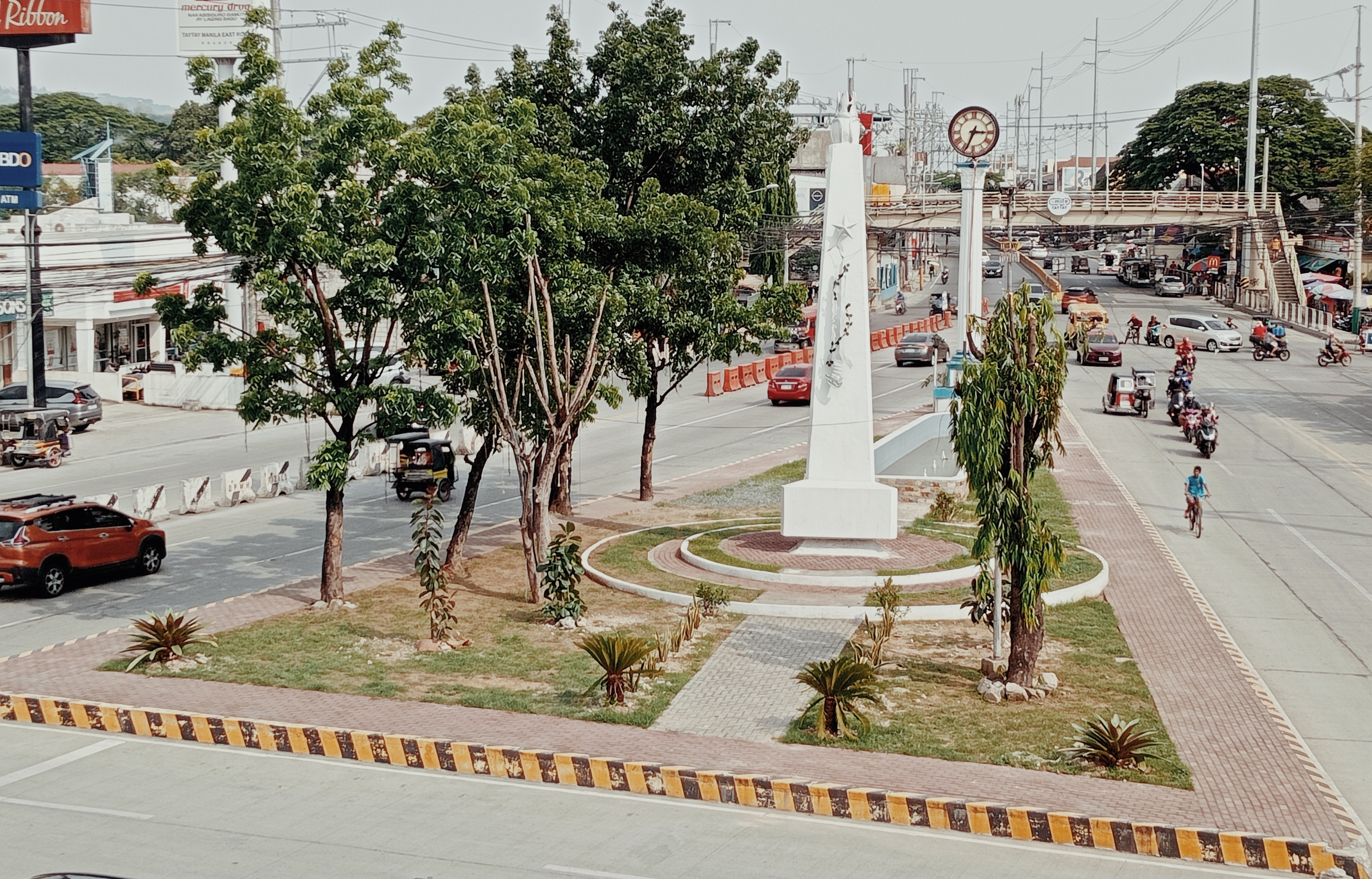
- (From top, left to right: Rizal Avenue • St. John the Baptist Church • New Taytay Municipal Hall • Taytay Kalayaan Park • Taytay Public Market • Veterans Memorial Park)

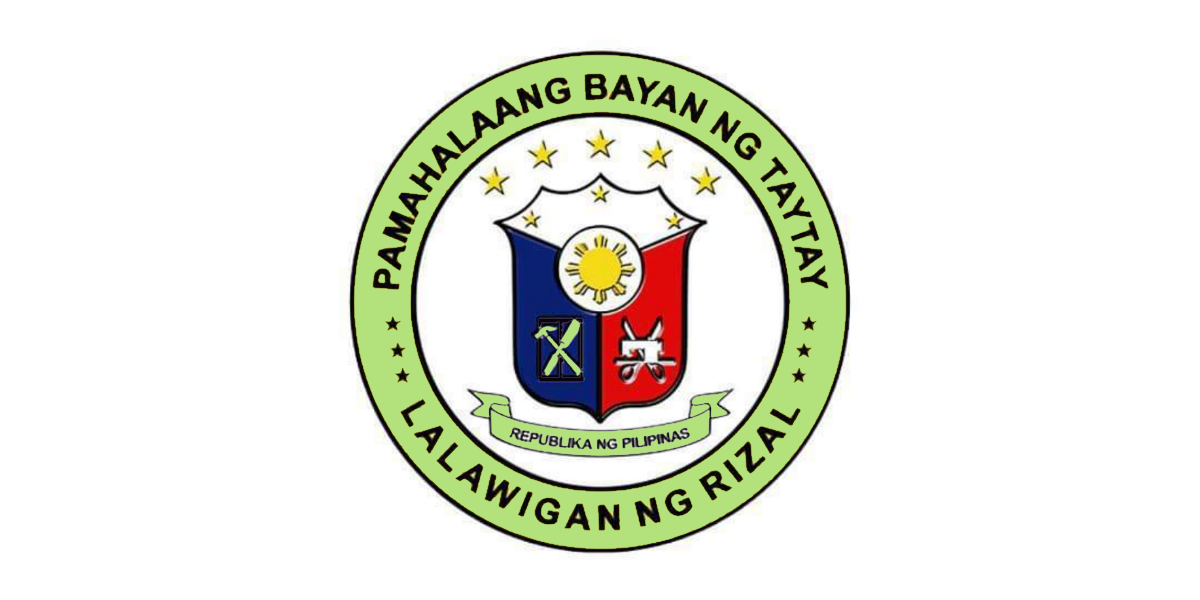
- Flag Seal
- Nickname: Woodworks and Garments Capital of the Philippines
- Motto: Smile Taytay!
- Anthem: Mabuhay Ang Taytay (Long live, Taytay)
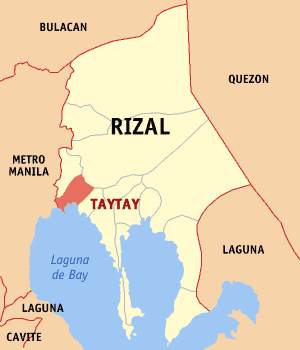
- Map of Rizal with Taytay highlighted
- Interactive map of Taytay
- Location within the Philippines
- Coordinates: 14°34′09″N 121°07′57″E
- Country: Philippines
- Region: Calabarzon
- Province: Rizal
- District: 1st district
- Founded: October 12, 1903
- Barangays: 5 (see Barangays)

Government
  - Type: Sangguniang Bayan
  - Mayor: Allan Martine S. De Leon
  - Vice Mayor: Jan Victor B. Cabitac
  - Representative: Rebecca Ma. A. Ynares
  - Municipal Council: Members: Patrick John P. Alcantara; Michell B. Bermundo; Joanne Marie P. Calderon; Carizza A. Cortez-Rkhami; John Tobit E. Cruz; Kristofer Charls S. Esguerra; Ma. Elaine T. Leonardo; Rulf Marius J. Valera
  - Electorate: 161,880 voters (2025)

Area
  - Total: 38.80 km^{2} (14.98 sq mi)
- Elevation: 50 m (160 ft)
- Highest elevation: 331 m (1,086 ft)
- Lowest elevation: 1 m (3.3 ft)

Population (2024 census)
  - Total: 397,111
  - Rank: 2 out of 1,489 Municipalities
  - Density: 10,230/km^{2} (26,510/sq mi)
  - Households: 92,234

Economy
  - Income class: 1st municipal income class
  - Poverty incidence: 5.41% (2023)
  - Revenue: ₱ 1,779 million (2024)
  - Assets: ₱ 3,743 million (2024)
  - Expenditure: ₱ 1,778 million (2024)
  - Liabilities: ₱ 71.41 million (2024)

Service provider
  - Electricity: Manila Electric Company (Meralco)
- Time zone: UTC+8 (PST)
- ZIP code: 1920
- PSGC: 0405813000
- IDD : area code: +63 (0)2
- Native languages: Tagalog
- Catholic diocese: Diocese of Antipolo
- Website: www.taytayrizal.gov.ph

Taytay, officially the Municipality of Taytay (Filipino: Bayan ng Taytay; IPA: [taɪˈtaɪ]), is a municipality in the province of Rizal, Philippines. According to the 2024 census, it has a population of 397,111 people. It is the 2nd most populous municipality in the country, after Rodriguez, Rizal. It is also known as the Garments and Woodcrafts Capital of the Philippines.

While economically, demographically and politically qualified, plans to convert it into a city was set aside, pending social and administrative reforms in the municipality.

According to the 2022 Commission on Audit (COA) Annual Financial Report, Taytay is the seventh richest municipality in the Philippines with a total asset of ₱3.67 billion.

In 2023, the National Competitiveness Council has named Taytay as the "2nd Most Competitive Municipality (1st & 2nd Class)".

== Etymology ==
Taytay is derived from taytáy, an archaic Tagalog word meaning "a small foot bridge made from bamboo or wooden poles".

== History ==
Taytay was a settlement situated along the coastline of the eastern side of Laguna de Bay that formed part of the Kingdom of Namayan, also known as the Kingdom of "Sapa", which was ruled by Lakan Tagkan. The said territory is now known as the district of Santa Ana, Manila.

Upon the arrival of the Franciscan missionaries on July 2, 1578, in Manila, they proceeded to evangelize the inhabitants of Namayan and organized it into a pueblo and named it Visita Santa Ana de Sapa. It comprised the communities of Meycatmon, Calatongdongan, Dongos, Dibag, Pinacauasan, Yamagtogon, Meysapan (Pasay), Malate, Dilao (Paco), Pandacan, Quiapo, Sampaloc, San Miguel, San Juan del Monte, San Felipe Neri (Mandaluyong), San Pedro Macati, and Taytay. Thence, the district of Santa Ana de Sapa became the Franciscan's central mission station.

In 1579, Taytay was formally established as a town and Church in a symbiotic relation, i.e., it presupposes that one could not have existed without the other. A church was built out of light materials and called it "Visita de Santa Ana de Sapa". Taytay—now a larger village, a pueblo, a town—came into being, as a juridical entity as well as an actual territorial unit.

Saint John the Baptist has since been the patron of the town and the parish under the ministry of the Franciscans.

The ecclesial jurisdiction of Taytay, including the visita of Cainta, which was an annex of Taytay, were transferred to the newly arrived Jesuit missionaries in 1591. They served until 1768—for 177 years.

Fray Pedro Chirino, a distinguished historian, became the first Jesuit parish priest of Taytay. He celebrated his first Holy Mass as a missionary in the swampy resettlement area on March 25, 1591, the feast of the Annunciation.

Due to incessant flood, the town was relocated to a higher ground. The people followed suit after the church was rebuilt atop a hill. Taytay town was dedicated to Saint John the Baptist and christened "San Juan del Monte" [which means “Saint John of the Mountain”]. "San Juan" got the "del Monte" tag in reference to the hilly terrain of the new relocation site of the town.

Nevertheless, the townspeople continued to call their town Taytay, and Taytay it has remained to this day.

This is the same location where the present St John the Baptist Parish Church still stands.

=== Encomienda in Taytay ===
Adelantado Miguel Lopez de Legazpi enforced the encomienda system into the Philippine Islands since his arrival in 1565. Taytay encomienda alone had 500 natives in 1582. There were about 400 households in Taytay, while only 100 households in Antipolo in 1591 [both encomiendas had already been granted to Juan Pacheco de Maldonado]; and in that same year, Taytay encomienda also listed 600 tributantes and inhabitants of 2,400 to 3,000.

The kinds of encomienda were those of the Royal Crown (encomienda de la real corona), and those of the private persons (encomienda de perticulares). In 1591, the encomienda of Taytay which was included in the vast district of Santa Ana de Sapa, belonged to the Royal Crown.

The lakeshore town of Taguig on the West was at the opposite side of Taytay on the East of Laguna de Bay. They were both encomiendas under the scope of Santa Ana de Sapa. They were separated by a narrow tip portion of Pasig town. Adjacent to Pasig was the area situated on the lakeshore of Barangay Santa Ana of Taytay. It was a tract of agricultural land considered as a "friar estate" which is still known today as "Lupang Arenda" which has now become a relocation and resettlement site.

“Arenda” is a lease of fixed assets or of prerogatives, such as land, or of special rights engaging in agriculture, mining, the collection of duties and taxes. “Arenda” rights are directly associated with the encomienda.

According to former Taytay Mayor Felix Sanvictores, who served from 1925 to 1931, "Lupang Arenda" was donated by Don Juan Valerio Gonzales and Don Cristobal Paramdam to the Municipio in 1740. Aside from their own farmlands, Taytay farmers were also benefiting from farming in the arenda as well as fishing in the wide rivers flowing down the lake and in the vast flooded farmlands near the lake during the rainy season.”

On February 23, 1853, a decree of the Superior Government created a new district composed of the towns of Taytay, Antipolo, Bosoboso, and Cainta from the Province of Tondo and the towns of Morong, Baras, Tanay, Pililla, Angono, Binangonan, Cardona, and Jalajala from the Province of La Laguna, with Morong as its capital town. It was later called Distrito Politico-Militar de Morong.

=== American occupation ===
Taytay suffered heavy casualties during the Philippine–American War in 1899, with the church almost burned down and most of the town razed to the ground.

On June 11, 1901, Taytay became part of the newly created Province of Rizal by virtue of an Act No. 137 enacted by the First Philippine Commission. In 1903, Taytay was merged with the neighboring towns of Cainta and Angono by virtue of Act No. 942. That did not last long as Angono was separated to be merged with Binangonan later that year and Cainta became an independent town again in 1914.

During the Second World War, Taytay was occupied by Japanese forces in 1942. Local soldiers of the pre-war 42nd Infantry Division of the Philippine Commonwealth Army and 4th Constabulary Regiment of the Philippine Constabulary liberated and entered Taytay in 1945 to help the recognized guerrilla fighter units to defeat and attack the Japanese Imperial Army.

=== Philippine independence ===
On November 7, 1975, by virtue of Presidential Decree No. 824, which created Metro Manila, Taytay was among the towns that remained within the province of Rizal.

=== Contemporary era ===
The National Competitiveness Council named Taytay as the "2nd Most Competitive Municipality (1st & 2nd Class) since 2016 until 2017", up from 10th place in 2014 and 3rd place in 2015. In The Year 2018, The Municipality of Taytay jumped from "2nd Most Competitive Municipality" to "1st Most Competitive Municipality (1st & 2nd Class)

== Geography ==
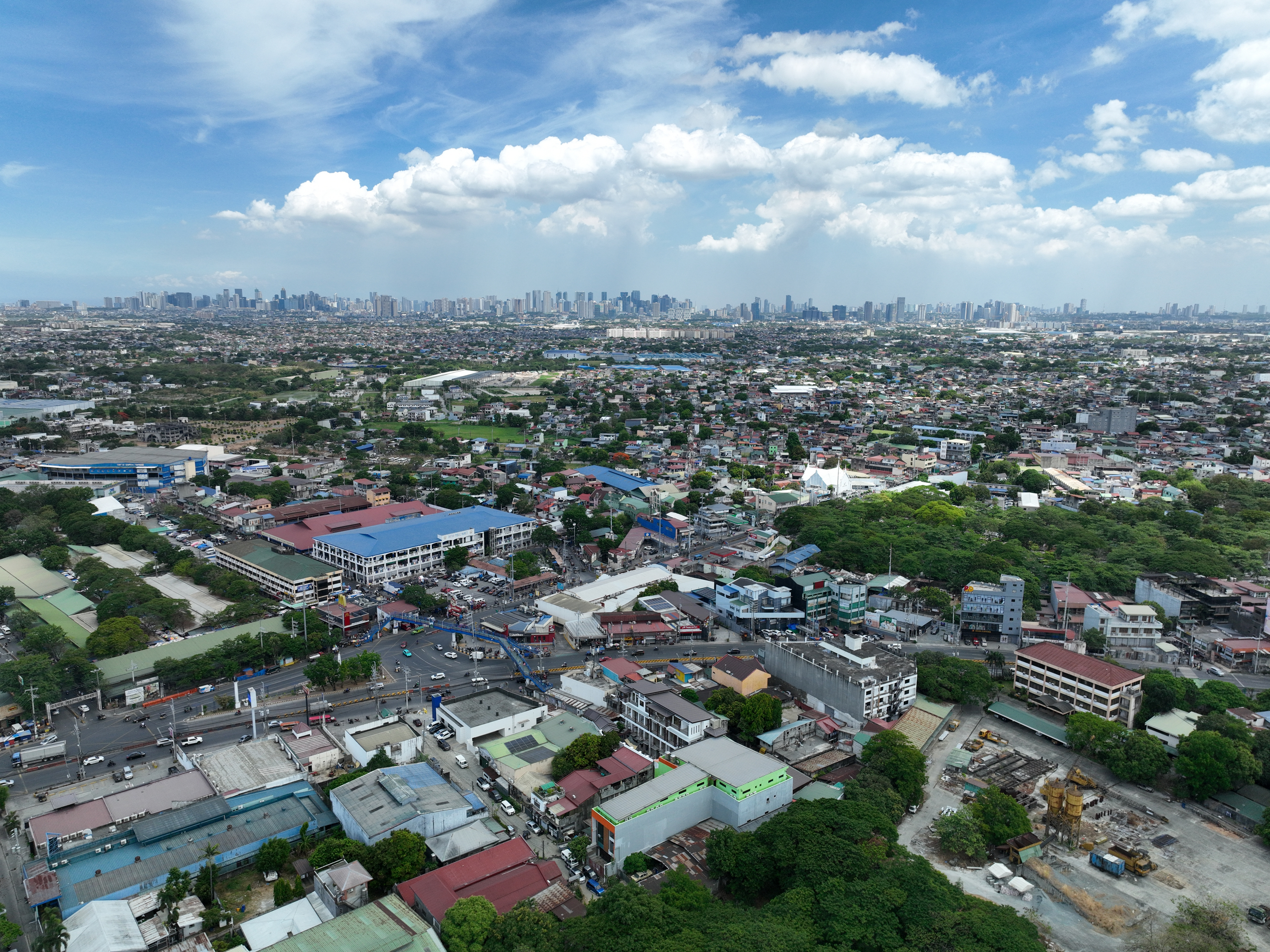
Aerial view of Taytay, 2026

Taytay is situated in Rizal province's western portion, bounded by the grids 14° 34’ 24" north latitude and 121° 07’ 48" east longitude. Conurbanated with Metro Manila, it shares boundaries with Cainta in the Northwest, Antipolo in the North-north-east, Angono in the East-southeast and Taguig in the Southwest. The municipality is sited to East of Pasig and to the North of Laguna de Bay. It has an area of 38.80 km^{2} (14.98 mi^{2}) representing 3.3% of Rizal Province's land area.

The shape of Taytay is rectangular – trapezoidal with gently hilly rolling terrain on its eastern side while relatively flat on its south-western side, including the poblacion. The municipality's highest elevation ranges from 200 to 255 meters (656 to 837 ft) which is situated along the inner north-eastern hills of Barangay Dolores, alongside the Antipolo Boundary. Its lowest points are from 5 to 20 meters (16 to 66 ft) along the southern portion of Barangay San Juan and Muzon towards Laguna Lake.

From Laguna de Bay, the Pasig River runs between Taguig, and Taytay, Rizal, before entering Pasig.

The Manggahan Floodway lessens flood conditions in Metro Manila by carrying flood waters to Laguna de Bay, but contributes to flooding of the coastal areas of Taguig, Taytay, and other towns in Laguna and Rizal along the lake.

The municipality is principally drained by south-west trending rivers such as Taytay River, Panghulo River, and Napindan Channel, all of which empties into Laguna Lake. Taytay River flows across Barangays Dolores and San Isidro and joins Antipolo River (present course of Manggahan Floodway) as it passes through the southern end of Barangays Santa Ana and San Juan. Panghulo River snakes its way from upper Taytay across Barangay San Juan towards the southern portion of Barangay Muzon. Napindan Channel crosses the southern boundaries of Barangay Santa Ana and San Juan as it empties into Laguna Lake. Bangiad Creek, found at the south-eastern limits of the municipality, flows south-west ward across Barangay Muzon, extending toward Laguna Lake.

=== Location ===
Taytay is 20 kilometers (12 mi) away from Manila. It is accessible from various points from Metro Manila through the Ortigas Avenue Extension, Manila East Road, Taytay Diversion Road (segments of Radial Road 5 or R-5), Felix Avenue (formerly Imelda Avenue), Manggahan Floodway, and Sumulong Highway.

=== Barangays ===
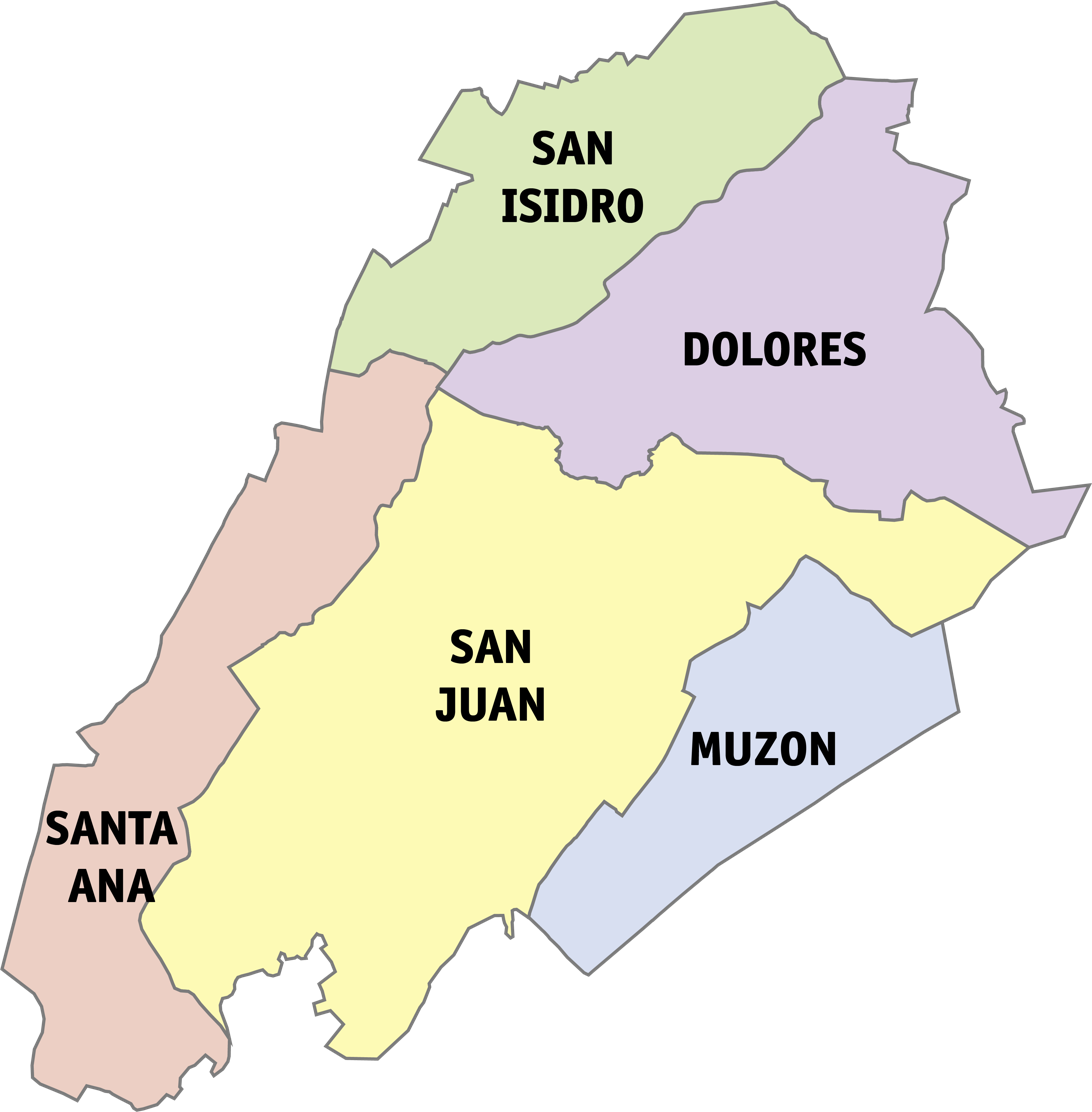
Political subdivisions

Taytay is politically subdivided into five barangays, as indicated in the matrix below and the image herein. Each barangay consists of puroks and some have sitios.

Taytay’s political subdivision has remained unchanged despite its continuous economic growth and increasing population density. Taytay conspicuously has the fewest barangays throughout the country. At present, residents are calling for the establishment of additional barangays to improve local administration and address the needs of the growing population..

San Juan is the largest and most populous barangay and is the center of the municipality and its local industries.

| Barangay | Population (2024) | Barangay Captain | Land Area (ha.) |
|---|---|---|---|
| Dolores (Poblacion) | 75,883 | Reinier Andrew "Inye" S. Pacleb | 1,237 |
| Muzon | 34,422 | Aniel "Bugloy" Cruz | 341 |
| San Isidro | 42,362 | Vivian Reyes-Yupangco | 442 |
| San Juan | 135,535 | Roseller "Rasel" Z. Valera | 1,490 |
| Santa Ana | 108,909 | Jean Lalaine "LengJoey" P. Calderon | 800 |

=== Climate ===
Climate data for Taytay, Rizal
| Month | Jan | Feb | Mar | Apr | May | Jun | Jul | Aug | Sep | Oct | Nov | Dec | Year |
|---|---|---|---|---|---|---|---|---|---|---|---|---|---|
| Mean daily maximum °C (°F) | 29 (84) | 30 (86) | 32 (90) | 34 (93) | 33 (91) | 31 (88) | 30 (86) | 29 (84) | 29 (84) | 30 (86) | 30 (86) | 29 (84) | 31 (87) |
| Mean daily minimum °C (°F) | 20 (68) | 20 (68) | 21 (70) | 23 (73) | 24 (75) | 25 (77) | 24 (75) | 24 (75) | 24 (75) | 23 (73) | 22 (72) | 21 (70) | 23 (73) |
| Average precipitation mm (inches) | 7 (0.3) | 7 (0.3) | 9 (0.4) | 21 (0.8) | 101 (4.0) | 152 (6.0) | 188 (7.4) | 170 (6.7) | 159 (6.3) | 115 (4.5) | 47 (1.9) | 29 (1.1) | 1,005 (39.7) |
| Average rainy days | 3.3 | 3.5 | 4.8 | 8.1 | 18.9 | 23.5 | 26.4 | 25.5 | 24.5 | 19.6 | 10.4 | 6.4 | 174.9 |
Source: Meteoblue

== Demographics ==
Population census of Taytay

| Year | Pop. | ±% p.a. |
|---|---|---|
| 1903 | 6,067 | — |
| 1918 | 7,429 | +1.36% |
| 1939 | 10,891 | +1.84% |
| 1948 | 14,144 | +2.95% |
| 1960 | 21,747 | +3.65% |
| 1970 | 46,717 | +7.94% |

| Year | Pop. | ±% p.a. |
|---|---|---|
| 1975 | 58,274 | +4.53% |
| 1980 | 75,328 | +5.27% |
| 1990 | 112,403 | +4.08% |
| 1995 | 144,748 | +4.85% |
| 2000 | 198,183 | +6.97% |
| 2007 | 262,485 | +3.95% |

| Year | Pop. | ±% p.a. |
|---|---|---|
| 2010 | 288,956 | +3.56% |
| 2015 | 319,104 | +1.91% |
| 2020 | 386,451 | +4.11% |
| 2024 | 397,111 | +0.66% |

Source: Philippine Statistics Authority

In the 2024 census, the population of Taytay was 397,111 people, with a density of 10,000 inhabitants per square kilometer or 26,000 inhabitants per square mile.

== Government ==
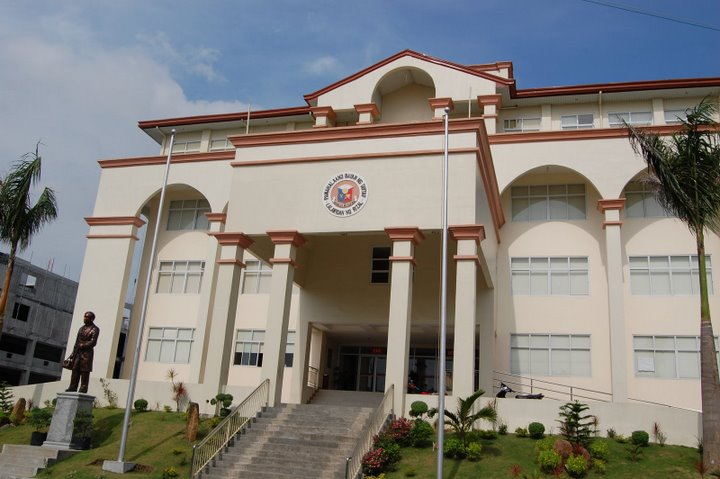
New municipal hall

=== Local government ===
The municipality is governed by a municipal mayor designated as its local chief executive and by a municipal council as its legislative body in accordance with the Local Government Code. The mayor, vice mayor, and the councilors are elected directly by the people through an election which is being held every three years.

=== Elected officials ===
List of government officials from June 30, 2025:

- Mayor: Allan Martine S. De Leon
- Vice Mayor: Jan Victor "JV" B. Cabitac
- Councilors:
1. Joanne Marie "Joan" P. Calderon
2. Rulf Marius "JV" G. Valera
3. Ma. Elaine "Boknay" T. Leonardo
4. Patrick John P. Alcantara
5. Carizza "Cai" A. Cortez
6. John Tobit E. Cruz
7. Michell "Mitch" B. Bermundo
8. Kristofer Charls "Kiko" S. Esguerra
- ABC President: Roseller "Rasel" Z. Valera
- SK President: Lucia Marie "Iya" D. Alcantara

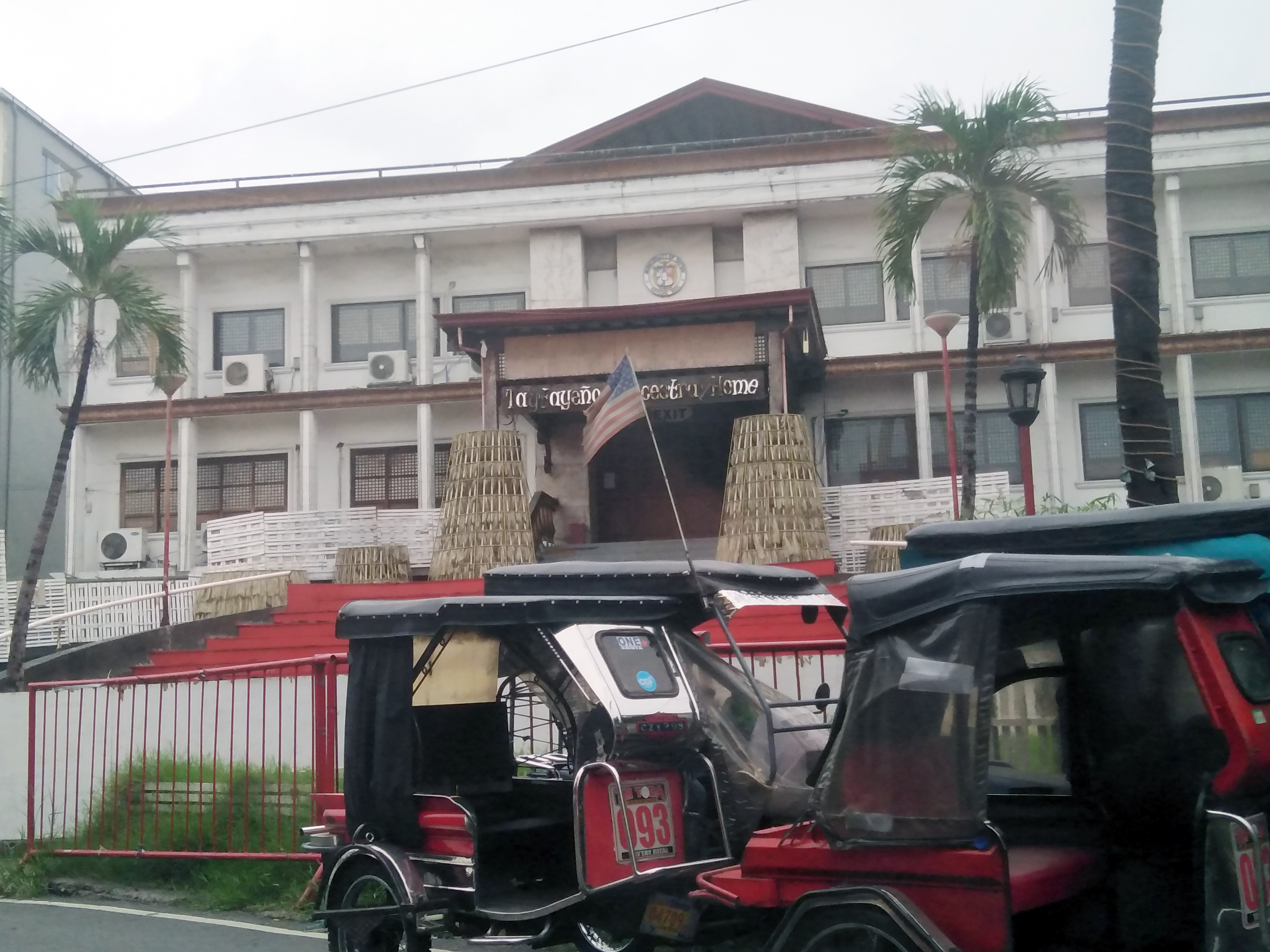
The Taytayeño Ancestral Home (formerly the Taytay Municipal Hall)

=== List of local chief executives ===
| No. | Name | Title | Served (From) | Until |
|---|---|---|---|---|
| 1 | Celdonio Javier | Mayor | 1901 | 1902 |
| 2 | Lorenzo Lacanienta | Mayor | 1902 | 1903 |
| 3 | Adaucto Ocampo | Mayor | 1903 | 1904 |
| 4 | Exequiel Ampil | Mayor | 1904 | 1907 |
| 5 | Honesto Gonzaga | Mayor | 1908 | 1911 |
| 6 | Jorge Basig | Mayor | 1912 | 1913 |
| 7 | Gonzalo V. Naval Sr. | Mayor | 1913 | 1918 |
| 8 | Ciriaco Valle | Mayor | 1918 | 1921 |
| 9 | Aquilino Velasquez | Mayor | 1922 | 1925 |
| 10 | Felix M. Sanvictores | Mayor | 1925 | 1931 |
| (9) | Aquilino Velasquez | Mayor | 1931 | 1934 |
| 11 | Eladio T. Alcantara | Mayor | 1934 | 1937 |
| 12 | Enrique L. Reyes | Mayor | 1938 | 1944 |
| 13 | Delfin R. Del Rosario | Acting Mayor | 1944 | 1945 |
| 14 | Manuel I. Santos | OIC Mayor | 1946 | 1947 |
| 15 | Emiliano I. Cruz | Mayor | 1948 | 1951 |
| (14) | Manuel I. Santos | Mayor | 1952 | 1963 |
| 16 | Antonio C. Esguerra | Mayor | 1964 | 1971 |
| 17 | Benjamin B. Esguerra | Mayor | 1972 | 1979 |
| (14) | Manuel I. Santos | Mayor | 1980 | 1981 |
| 18 | Ricardo J. Rufino | Mayor | 1981 | 1986 |
| 19 | Romeo C. De leon | Acting Mayor | 1986 | 1987 |
| 20 | Isidro T. Sanvictores | OIC Mayor | 1988 | |
| 21 | Godofredo C. Valera | Mayor | 1988 | 1998 |
| 22 | June V. Zapanta | Mayor | 1998 | 2004 |
| 23 | George Ricardo R. Gacula II | Mayor | 2004 | 2013 |
| 24 | Janet De Leon-Mercado | Mayor | 2013 | 2016 |
| (23) | George Ricardo R. Gacula II | Mayor | 2016 | 2022 |
| 25 | Allan Martine S. De Leon | Mayor | 2022 | Present |

=== Seal ===
The Municipal seal is composed of a gold-colored single circular arc, encrypted with the word "BAYAN NG TAYTAY" at the upper part and "LALAWIGAN NG RIZAL" at the lower part.

The emblem at the center represents the town, its colors came from the Philippine Flag. The left side resembles two-crossed hammers and grills, represents the Taytay's industrious workers while right side resembles a sewing machine and a scissor represents the People of Taytay which were marked in the field of Dress-making. Conspicuously, this also represents the HaMaKa (Hamba, Makina at Kabuhayan) that Taytay is celebrating annually.

The five stars at the most upper part, represents the five barangays that compose the municipality. Finally, the scroll at the bottom part encrypted with "Republika ng Pilipinas" basically pertains to the Philippine Republic.

== Economy ==
Poverty incidence of Taytay (%)

Source: Philippine Statistics Authority

=== Garment industry ===
The town of Taytay is considered as the Garments Capital of the Philippines. Garment industry is the main economic driver of the town known for its high quality ready-to-wear (RTW) clothing. The town's garment industry and its related downstream cottage industries provide livelihood and employment opportunities to people on its villages where subcontracting among household families is a cottage industry. It has also spawned small entrepreneurial brick-and-mortar stores and online sellers among its residents. The upstream industries created is the mushrooming of textile markets, sewing machine making, and cargo and delivery.

Taytay town is now the Philippines' production hub of cheaper ready-to-wear clothes. It enabled the country to resurrect its garment industry back after decades of hiatus due to competition from countries such as Bangladesh, Cambodia, Vietnam and to a certain extent China. It is now displacing imported clothing due to its highly competitive pricing, wide array designs and quality.

Today, various shops cluster in Kalayaan park every Friday or in Club Manila East Open Space every Saturday to take the advantage of low-cost ready-made clothing.

As of 2017, there are around 10 garments center operating in Club Manila East Compound. Each garment center has hundreds to thousands of stalls selling different clothes by family owned garment factories. Of these ten, the biggest are Taytay Municipal Tiangge, Bagpi Garment Center, Igpai Garment Center, MASUERTE 4JC Tiangge and Freedom bazaar. Each center has varying schedule of opening and closing but almost all are open on main market days of Monday and Thursday evenings.

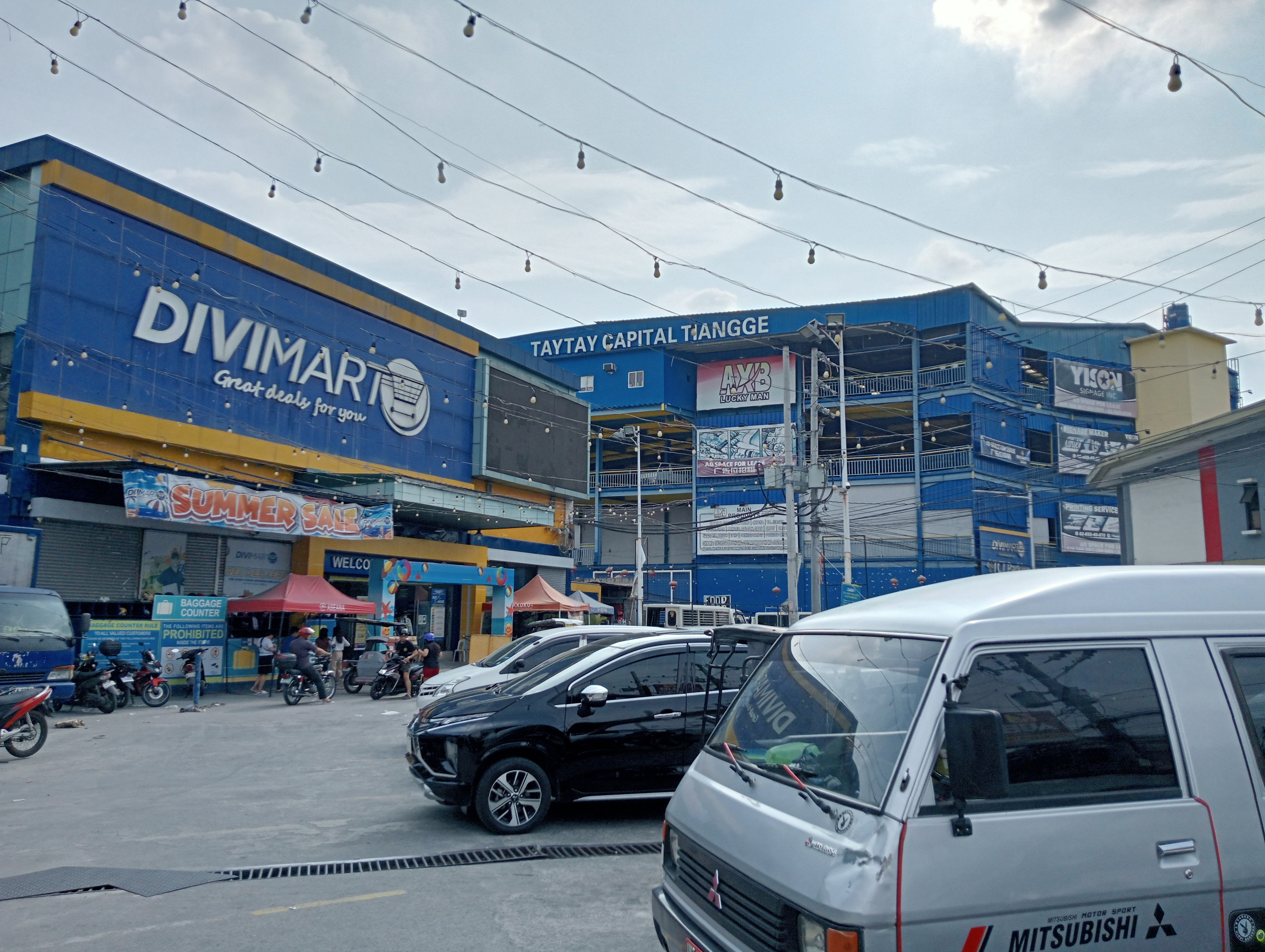
Taytay Capital Tiangge

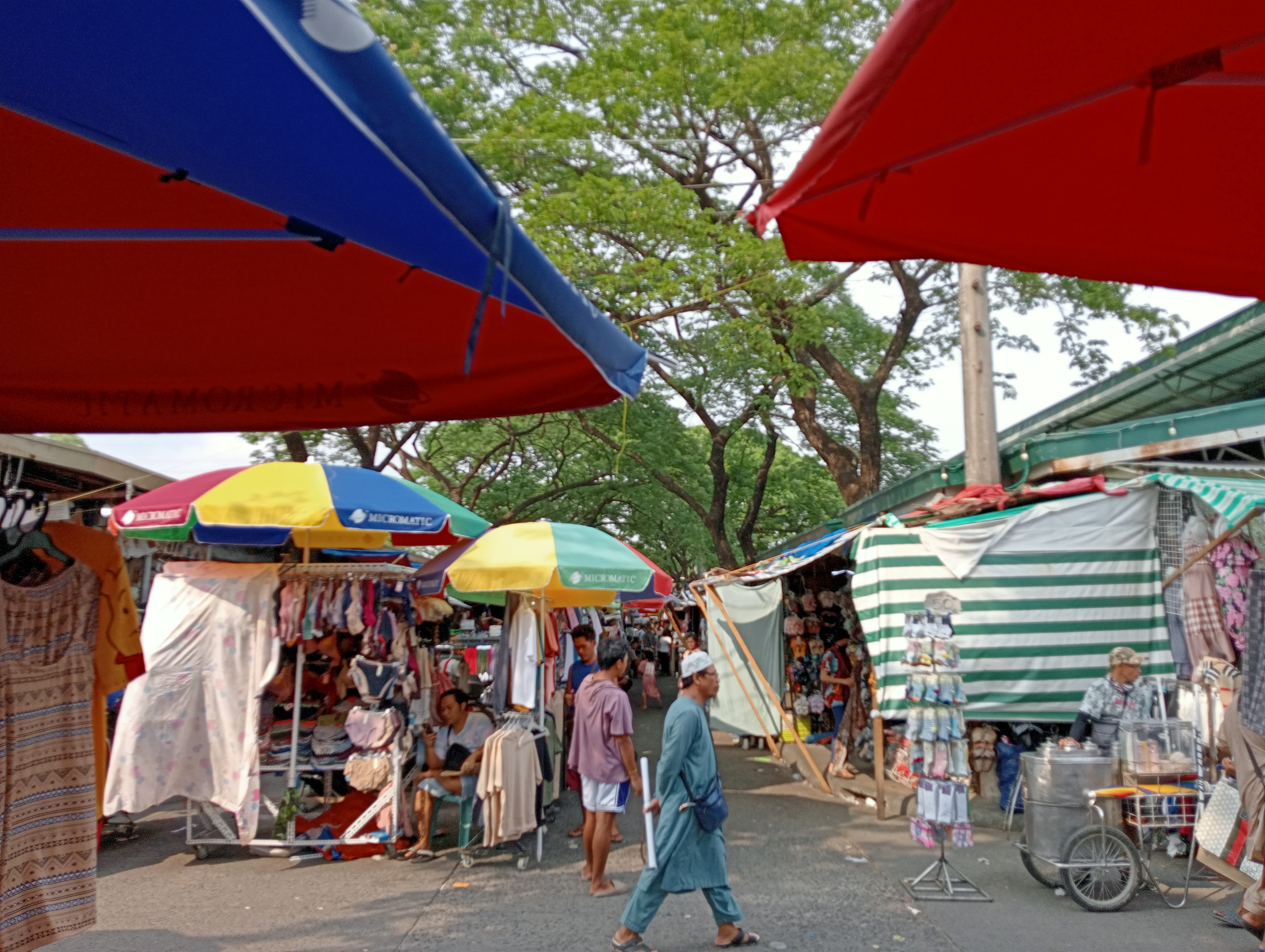
Taytay Tiangge

=== Wood-based industry ===
The smaller wood working industry is another contributor to its economy.

Woodworks continue to be a valuable source of income among the residents of this town. Several carving shops continue to survive despite the threats of cheaper imported products.

Among woodworks produced in the town are doors, furnitures, and other wood-based products.

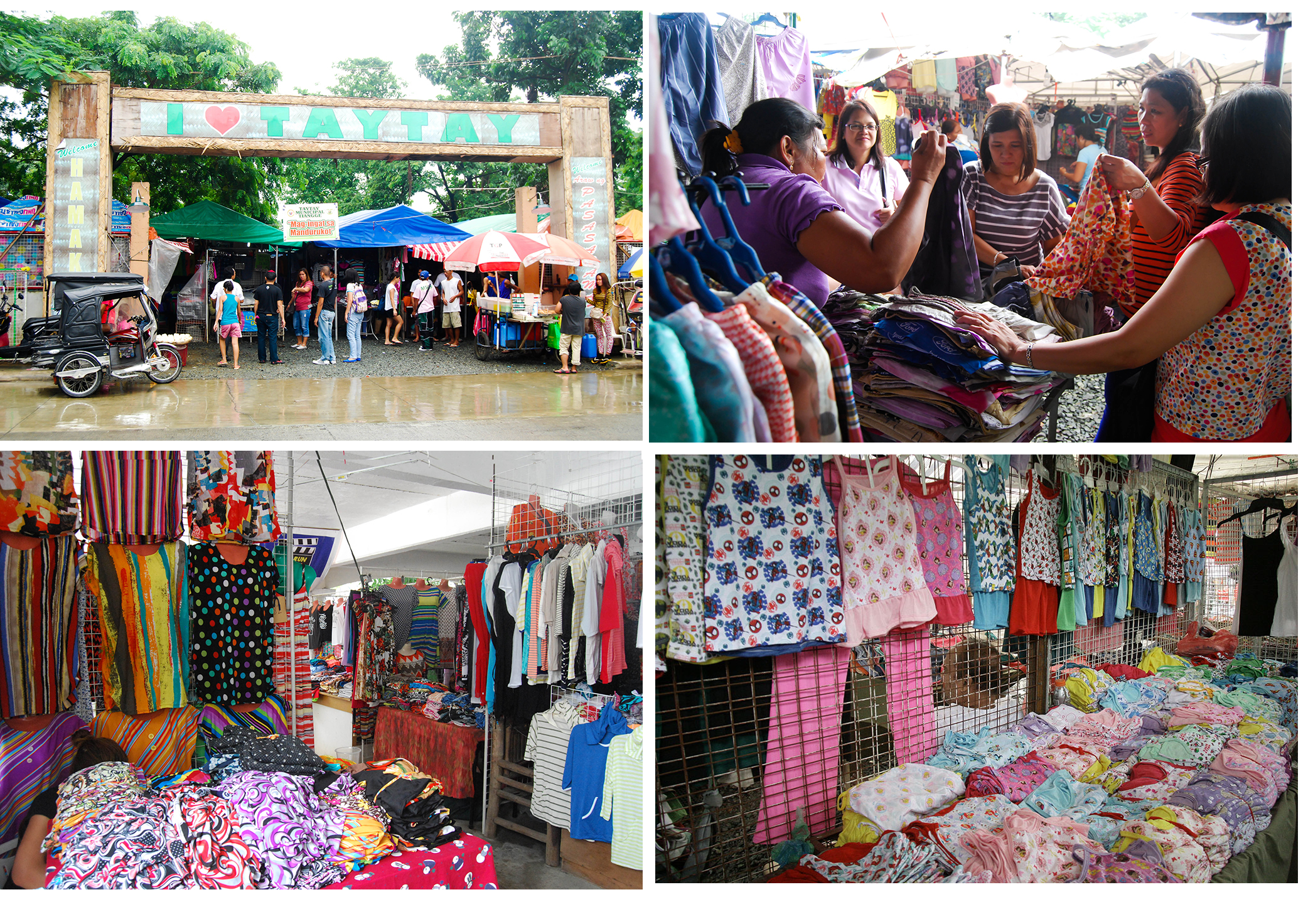
Taytay Wholesalers' Tiangge takes place every Monday until Tuesday morning and Thursday until Friday morning beside Taytay New Market, a 5-min walk from SM Taytay

Several multinational companies have also made their presence here, which include SM Prime Holdings, Puregold Price Club Inc., Wilcon Builders, Megaworld Constructions and several more.

Taytay's local income surged to Php 770 million during the first quarter in 2016, making it the second richest municipality in the province after Cainta. The economy is in transitory period from agricultural to a more pronounced commercial and industrial activities.

=== Commerce and industry ===
Commerce and industry is a very active economic sector in the municipality. This sector contributes a substantial income to the municipal coffers.

As of late 2009s, commercial activity dominated the economic landscape with 75% of the total number of economic establishments registered with the Business Permits and Licensing Division of the municipal government. There are more than 7000 commercial and industrial firms operating in the municipality.

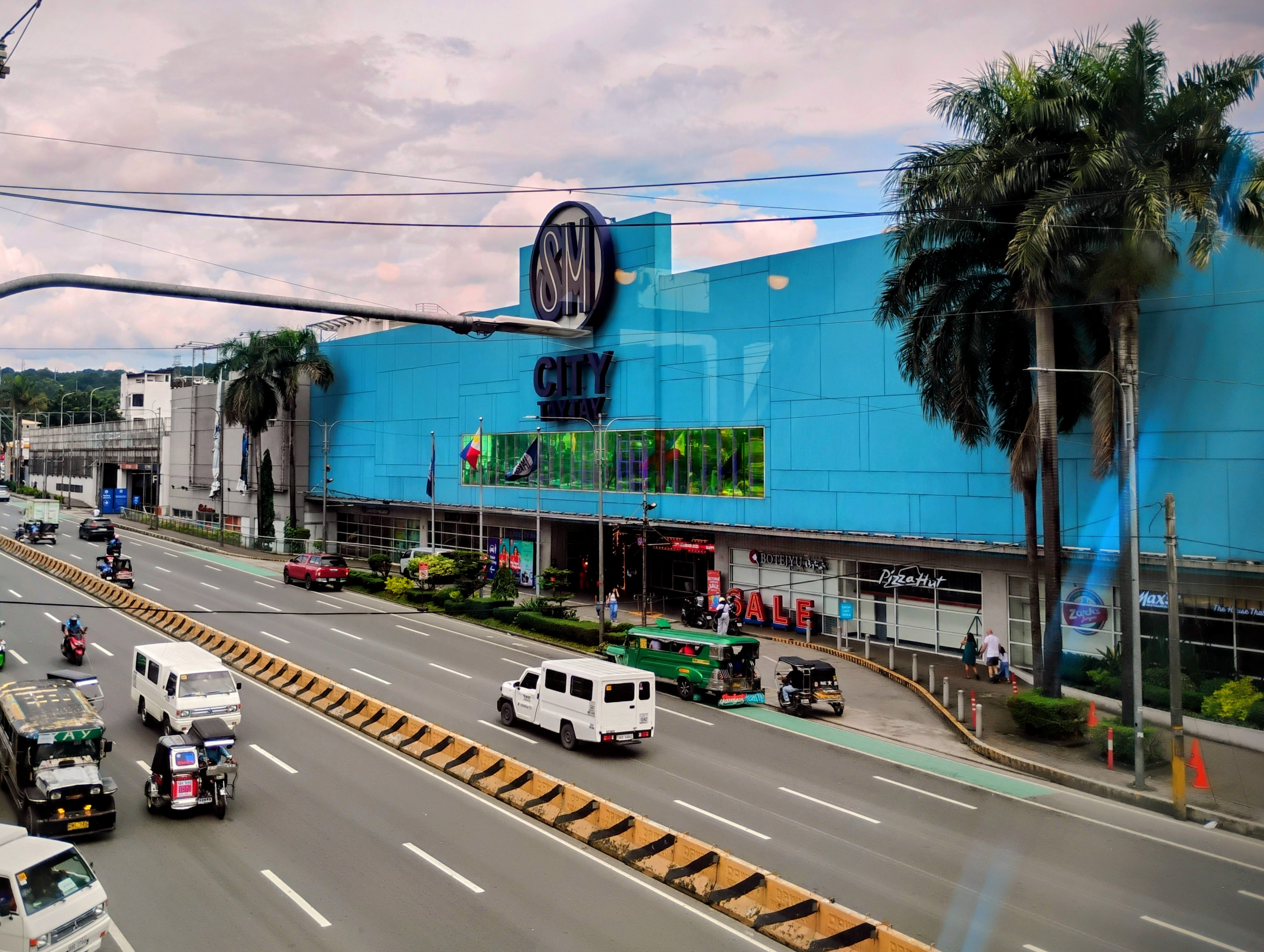
SM City Taytay

SM City Taytay is a shopping mall owned and constructed by SM Prime Holdings. It is the first SM Supermall in the province in Rizal. In 2014, SM Prime announced the expansion of the mall, with a four-storey mix commercial and office building set to rise in the newly acquired lot adjacent to the mall. In 2012, the town was ranked second after Cainta in the Philippines for the highest income.

=== Tourism and leisure ===
Club Manila East (CME) is another getaway destination in the heart of the municipality of Taytay. The resort-hotel has a 9,100 m^{2} (98,000 sq ft) "Funtasy Lagoon" pool which is a scaled-down model of Laguna de Bay. To date, CME has 70 overnight villas, and 4 big-room dormitories.

=== Real estate industry ===
In 2014, MySpace Properties, a Megawide Construction Corporation Subsidiary, has unveiled its newest mix-use commercial and residential complex along Ortigas Avenue in Barangay San Isidro, dubbed as The Hive Malls + Residences. The project sits beside Baltao compound and has a frontage of more than one hundred meters. It will host several commercial establishments and residential condominiums, providing a one-stop shop for Taytayenos who need not travel more to avail of some services and commercial goods. The project kicked off this October and is expected to be completed in the next one to two years.

=== IT industry ===
Taytay has a budding business processing outsourcing industry as it hosts some BPO locators. In 2016, Taytay was named as one of the 10 Next Wave Cities in the Philippines making it the next hub for the information technology and business process management (IT-BPM) sector. The location of Taytay was identified based on the 2015 assessment guided by the NWC scorecard, which includes the following criteria: talent, infrastructure, cost, and business environment.

Robinsons Companies are also conducting studies for the possibility of constructing another mall in the province. Coca-Cola Inc., San Miguel Breweries, Megaworld, Santa Lucia Realty, CityMall and Ayala Land have either planned or expanded its business portfolio in Taytay, citing reasons of economic viability, strong internal market and accessibility.

== Infrastructure ==
=== Waste management ===
Taytay has a current total fleet of only ten dump trucks that regularly collect the garbage generated by its five barangays. Their capabilities can haul the average generated solid waste of 50 to 60 metric tons (49 to 59 long tons; 55 to 66 short tons) per day based on population. These are dumped 3 kilometers (1.9 mi) away in a valley area near the boundary with Antipolo north-east of the town center and adjacent to Rosario Memorial Park.

=== Transportation ===
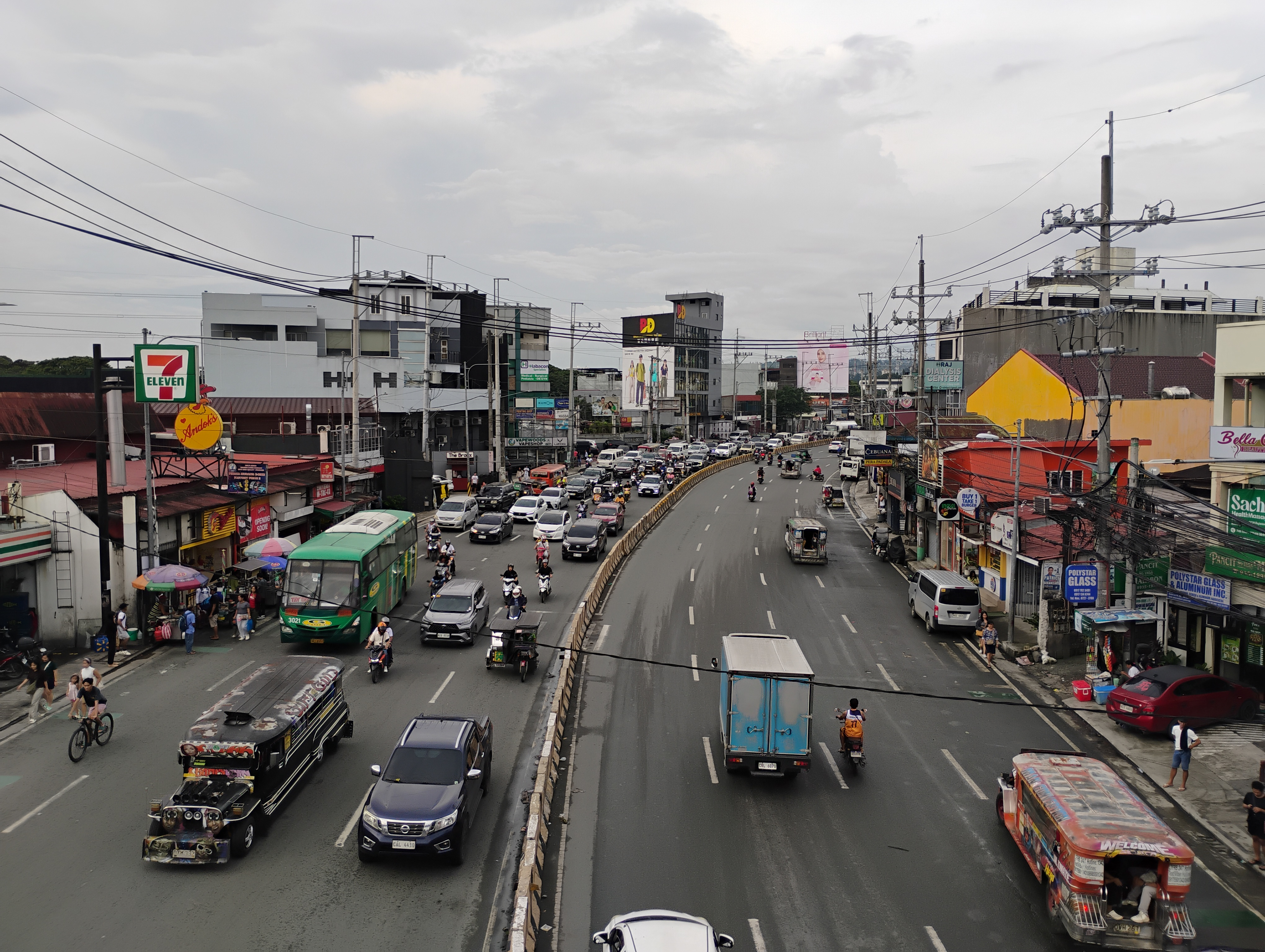
Taytay Diversion Road

Taytay has an existing road network with a total length of 139.666 kilometers (86.784 mi). The two main roads cutting through Taytay and serving as the main access from Metro Manila are Rizal Avenue which leads to the Poblacion and the Central Business district of the town and the Manila East Road connecting from Ortigas Avenue Extension which passes north and north-east of the town center. The roads meet at a junction just off the location of the New Taytay Public Market towards the adjacent town of Angono on its eastern boundary.

Before World War II, Taytay was also served by a railway system. Known as the Antipolo Line, this railroad line passed through Santa Mesa, Mandaluyong, Pasig, and Cainta, going all the way up to Antipolo near the Hinulugang Taktak Falls. Apart from a street named "Daangbakal" in Antipolo, no traces of this line presently survive especially in the Cainta and Taytay areas where the railway tracks used to be as roads have been paved over them.

Today, the town's transportation needs are served by tricycles, jeepneys, taxis, buses, and UV Express services, many of which serve to link the town to Metro Manila where many of the town's citizens work and study.

A proposed rapid transit line, MRT Line 4, to be built in Metro Manila and Rizal Province will link Taytay to Ortigas Center business center. When completed, it is expected to significantly reduce the volume of vehicular traffic along Ortigas Avenue and improve connectivity in the eastern parts of the metropolis, including the nearby municipalities in southern Rizal.

One exit point of the proposed Southeast Metro Manila Expressway will help decongest the existing roadways across Metro Manila, such as EDSA (C-4) and Circumferential Road 5 (C-5). SEMME is also known as the Metro Manila Skyway Stage 4. However, no right of way acquisition progress have made as of 2024.

=== Power ===
The provision of efficient power services is the linchpin of productivity Any area that envisions itself to modernize, to be more productive, and its product competitive needs to have ample power supply to engine its growth and development.

It has been recorded that Taytay is the third largest user of power among the towns of Rizal, which all have been energized and served the Meralco. This makes Taytay a town with sufficient power for domestic use. Added to this is the presence of a substation of the National Grid Corporation of the Philippines (NGCP) in Barangay Dolores.

=== Communications ===
Communication is another major and key infrastructure component. Its ample availability in an area is one of the essential requisites for economic progress and social integration.

Currently, majority of the communication needs of the people of Taytay are being served by the Philippine Long Distance Telephone Company (PLDT) with some availing of cellular phone and paging services. The number of telephones of the town is far beyond the minimum of one telephone line per 1000 residential population and also a single telephone line per 1500 population in industrial areas. Mobile services are also provided by Smart Communications, Globe Telecom, and Dito Telecommunity.

The town operates a telegraph services unit which issues an average of 116 transmissions and 5,483 telegrams of all kinds per month.

Taytay can be reached by all radio and television stations, printed communications such as newspapers and magazines are distributed from Metro Manila.

=== Medical and health care ===
The provision of primary health care is being undertaken by the Municipal Health Office which provides medical services to the Municipals five barangays. Taytay has seven health units with a total of 40 Barangay Health Centers. These are commonly staffed of doctors, nurses, dentists, midwives, etc. Only Taytay Emergency Hospital which is based at the Office of Municipal Health Officer at the Municipal Hall has daily schedule of 24/7 medical services. The other units are on scheduled basis.

The services offered by these hospitals and clinics to the municipal and provincial residents include out-patient treatment, child delivery, EENT treatment, surgery, internal medicine, pediatric, obstetrics and gynecological treatment and diagnosis of social diseases.

Some of the hospitals in Taytay are Taytay Emergency Hospital and Manila East Medical Center (MEMC), Taytay Doctors Hospital, and the Rizal Provincial Hospital System (RPHS) - Taytay Annex.

== Education ==
There are two schools district offices which govern all educational institutions within the municipality. They oversee the management and operations of all private and public, from primary to secondary schools. These are the Taytay I Schools District, and Taytay II Schools District.

=== Primary and elementary schools ===
- Academia de San Lorenzo Ruiz
- Angel Grace Academy
- Affordable Private Education Center
- Amazing Grace Christian Learning Center
- Angel of Wisdom Academy
- Bagong Pag-Asa Elementary School
- BBSI Christian Academy
- Bede & Benedict Multiple Intelligences Development Center
- Bridge Stone Learning Center
- Carmel KC Child Learning Center
- Child's Place Developmentally Appropriate Program School
- Christ's Wisdom Christian School
- Christian Heritage Academy
- Corazon C. Aquino Elementary School
- Cresdaville Elementary School
- Divine Child Jesus School
- Dolores Elementary School
- Felix M. Sanvictores Elementary School
- Funland Learning Center
- GB Knowledge Center
- Girls & Boys Knowledge Center
- Golden Faith Academy
- Golden Faith Academy with Special Education Center
- Hapay Na Mangga Elementary School
- Harris Development Center for Children
- Jewels of Heaven Learning Center
- Joy of Faith Integrated School
- Joyful and Creative Child Nurturing Tutorial Center
- Kapalaran Elementary School
- Kids Montessori
- Light Bearer Christian Academy
- Little Homes Montessori School
- Lord's Jewels Christian School
- Love Giver Christian Academy
- Lyncrest Christian Academy
- Mother of God Learning Center (Adhika St.)
- Mother of God Learning Center (San Juan)
- Muzon Christian Academy
- Muzon Elementary School
- Nagtinig Riverside Christian Academy
- Nazarene Child Development Academy
- Palmera Hills Six Children's Learning Center
- Palmera Homes II Learning Center
- Philippians Montessori School
- PJP Montessori Academy
- Precious Kesziah Learning School
- Precious Ones Kinderhome
- Raises Montessori Academe
- Rosario Ocampo Elementary School
- Sacred Heart of Jesus Academe
- San Francisco Elementary School
- San Isidro Elementary School
- San Juan A (Floodway) Elementary School
- San Lorenzo Ruiz Elementary School
- Shalom Learning Center
- Shekinah Christian School
- Shining Time Play Center
- Silver Gold Montessori Christian School
- Sitio Simona Elementary School
- Sitio Tapayan Elementary School
- Springs of Learning Child Development Center
- St. Anne Learning School
- St. John The Baptist Parochial School
- Sta. Ana Elementary School
- Star of Hope Christian School
- Tamayo Lavell Learning Center
- Taytay Elementary School
- Taytay United Methodist Christian School
- The Gift of Wings Learning and Development Center
- The Little Farm House Holistic Education & Development Center
- True Light Christian Academy
- Web tech International Academy
- Weensy Kids Learning Center

=== Secondary schools ===
- Antonio C. Esguerra Memorial National High School
- Benjamin B. Esguerra Memorial National High School
- Calabrian Formation School
- Casimiro A. Ynares Sr. Memorial National High School
- Manuel I. Santos Memorial National High School
- Master's Vineyard Academy
- Muzon National High School
- Silver Gold Integrated School
- Simona National High School
- Smart Creative Child Integrated School
- Taytay National High School
- Taytay Senior High School
- Virgo Ma. Regina Learning Center
- Word Integrated School East

=== Higher educational institutions ===
- Asia-Pacific Nazarene Theological Seminary
- Asian Institute of Computer Studies
- Baptist Bible Seminary and Institute
- Daehan College of Business and Technology
- ESRA Technical Training Foundation
- Grain of Wheat College
- ICCT Colleges
- Juan Sumulong Memorial Junior College
- Maritime Academy for Training and Education
- National College of Business and Arts
- San Beda College
- Siena College of Taytay
- Trent Information First Technical Career Institute
- University of Rizal System

== Notable personalities ==
- Alice Dixson - Actress, Philippines' representative for Miss International in 1986
- Toni Gonzaga-Soriano - Actress, Singer, TV Host, ("The Ultimatitan-sabay sabay Star")
- Alex Gonzaga-Morada - TV Host, Vlogger, Actress, Comedian, Book Author
- Rachel Daquis - Volleyball Athlete
- Xyriel Manabat - Child/Teen Actress
- Meg Imperial - Model, Actress
- Andrea Brillantes - Child/Teen Actress, Dancer (BFF 5 of ASAP)
- Jon Lucas - Teen Actor, Dancer, Rapper (former member of Hashtags of It's Showtime!)
- Oliver Barbosa - Chess Grand Master
- Rez Cortez - Res Septimo Cortez, better known as Rez Cortez, is a Filipino Veteran actor and assistant director
- Cai Cortez - Comedian Actress
- Rebecca Ynares - Former Politician, served as the Governor of Rizal Province in 2001–2004, and 2013–2022
