= Manuel I. Santos Memorial National High School =

Public high school in Rizal, Philippines

Manuel I. Santos Integrated School

Location
- Sitio Lambak, Barangay San Juan; Taytay, Rizal; Philippines
- Coordinates: 14°32′49″N 121°07′30″E

Information
- Type: Public
- Established: 2006
- Principal: Virgilio P. Ramos (2015-Present)
- Grades: 7 to 12
- Language: English and Filipino
- Color: Blue White
- Newspaper: "The Technopark"; "Ang Lambak"
- Hymn: MISMNHS Hymn

Manuel I. Santos Integrated School (formerly known as Manuel I. Santos Memorial National High School) is a public secondary school in Sitio Lambak, San Juan, Taytay, Rizal, Philippines. It was formerly an annex building of Taytay National High School and now an independent public secondary school. The school is named after Manuel Ignacio Santos who was then served as Municipal Mayor of Taytay (1946–1947), (1952–1960) and (1980–1981).

== History ==
Manuel I. Santos Integrated School was founded in 2000 as Taytay National High School - Manggahan Floodway Extension. It was located along the riverside at San Juan, Floodway, Taytay, Rizal.

In its first school year (2002–2003), the school was under the supervision of Mrs. Cynthia M. Cruz, as principal and Mrs. Mercidita L. Cu, as Teacher In-Charge. During that time, the school had only one unit building occupied by first year and second year students, while only ten dedicated teachers were serving the school. Due to rapid increase in the number of enrollees, another one-unit building with four classrooms was built to accommodate the students and staff. Under Cruz, with the support of the local government, stakeholders and teachers, continuous improvements and repairs of available school facilities were initiated.

In July 2003, Cruz, lobbied the initial separation of TNHS – MFE from its mother school. With the support and assistance of Mayor June V. Zapanta and PTCA officers, she made a proposal to Governor Casimiro M. Ynares regarding their desire to make the school an independent institution. The approval of the said request was denied until the end of 2003.

After a year, Miss Nerissa N. De Leon served as Teacher In-Charge from June 2003 to March 2004 while the school was under the supervision of the same principal Cruz. The absence of good facilities, insufficient instructional materials and teachers to address the far from ideal teacher-faculty ratio have plagued the new school administration.

In SY 2004–2006, Mrs. Mercidita L. Cu was replaced as Teacher In-Charge of the school and Mrs. Loida A. Alcantara served as the new principal. Over the years, the rapid and continuous growth of student population posted considerable problems. The new administrator pushed for construction of new building and procurement of supplies, books, and other instructional materials. These requests still failed to materialize.

DepEd approved the proposal regarding the separation of TNHS – MFE from its mother school and granted its new and permanent name – Manuel I. Santos Memorial National High School on June 13, 2006, in honor of the late Manuel I. Santos, former mayor of the Municipality of Taytay.

On January 22, 2006, during the term of office of Alcantara as principal and Cu as Teacher In-charge, the students and staff moved to their new and permanent location at Sitio Lambak, San Juan Floodway, Taytay, Rizal. The school that time had 12 classrooms. Its ground breaking ceremony was attended by government officials, PTCA officers and other stakeholders.

In May of school year 2005–2006, Mr. Celestino A. Santiago, took over as the Teacher In-charge of the school. Due to its growing population, additional buildings and facilities were constructed through the support of government officials and sponsorship of LGUs and NGOs. When Santiago was promoted as principal of the school in 2008, additional buildings and facilities as funds became available through government appropriations and donations from private institutions. He had been the school head until May 31, 2011.

At present, the school is under the supervision of the newly assigned principal, Mr. Virgilio P. Ramos. The school has a total of 3,601 students with 996 first year students, 899 second year students, 936 third year students, 770 fourth year students, 1 guidance counselor, 1 book keeper, 1 disbursing officer, 94 teaching staff, 3 non-teaching, and 6 maintenance personnel.

== Organizations ==
- Boy Scouts of the Philippines Rizal Council (Outfit 618)
- Red Cross Youth
- Supreme Student's Government (MISMNHS)
