= Muzon National High School =

Public high school in Rizal, Philippines

- Mataas na Paaralang Nasyonal ng Muzon (Filipino)
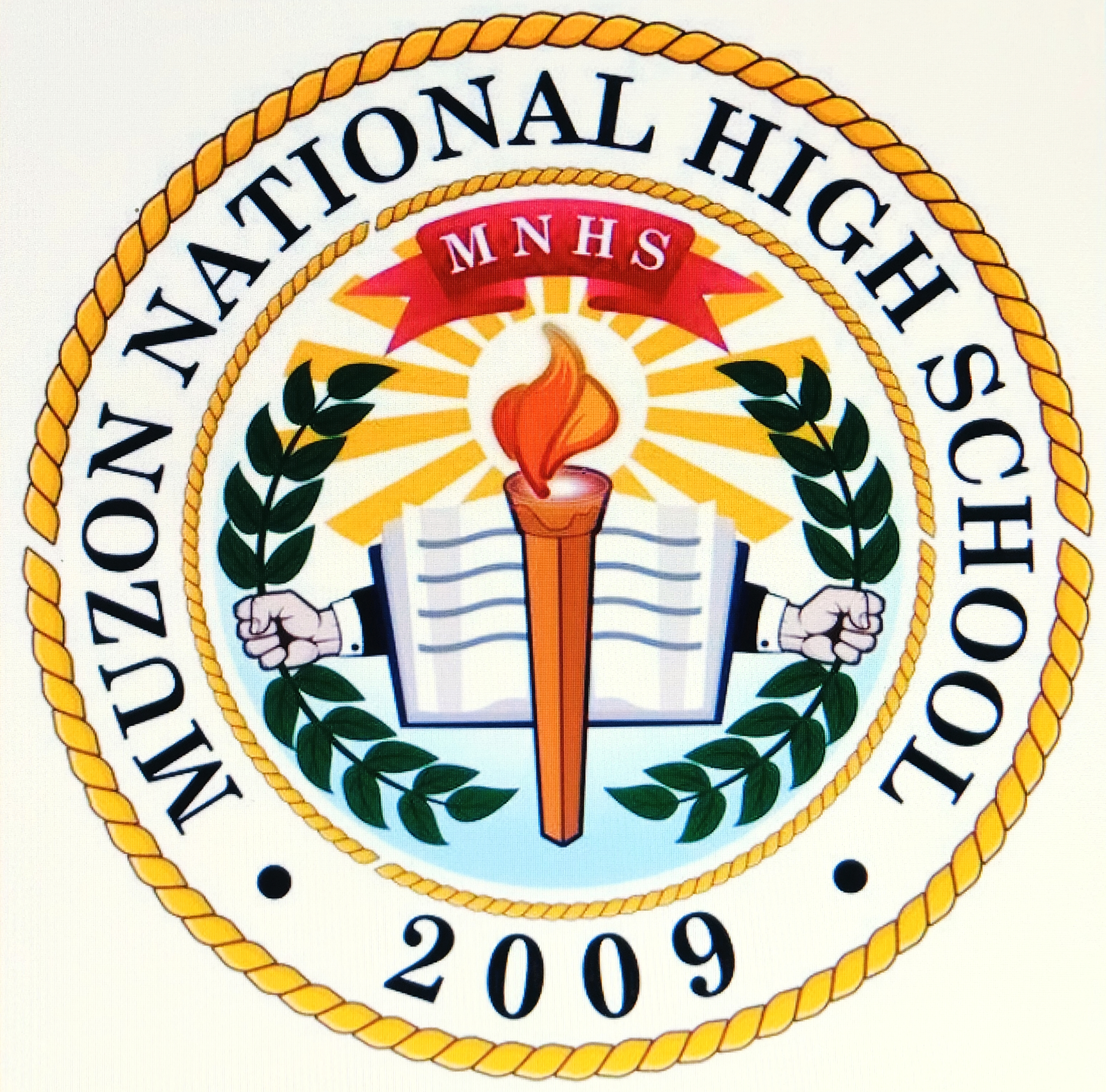
- New Official Muzon NHS

Location
- Sapphire Street, Ciudad Grande (main office) and Narra Street, San Miguel Subdivision, Barangay Muzon, Taytay, Rizal; Philippines; 14°32′26.8″N 121°08′27.6″E (Ciudad Building Campus); 14°32′27.78″N 121°8′36.7″E (Narra Building Campus)

Information
- School type: Public junior high school
- Motto: "Matapat at Maaasahan - tatak Muzonians 'yan!"
- Established: 2009
- School code: 308129
- Principal: Celestino A. Santiago (2025 - present)
- Grades: 7 to 10
- Language: Filipino; English
- Colors: Black, gray, and white
- Song: Muzon National High School Hymn
- Newspaper: "The Turning Point"
- Affiliation: Republic of the Philippines; Department of Education; Region IV-A CALABARZON; Division of Rizal
- Abbreviation: MuNHS; MuzonNHS
- Website: muzonnhs2009.weebly.com

Former Logo

Muzon National High School (abbreviated as MuzonNHS or MuNHS) is a public school in Taytay, Rizal, Philippines. It is situated in Sapphire Street, Ciudad Grande, Barangay Muzon, with a second building in Narra Street, San Miguel Subdivision.

It was established in 2009 and formerly known as "Noel Ireneo E. Reyes Memorial National High School". It is a government funded high school that offers junior high school education.

Muzon National High School was also known as "Taytay National High School - Muzon Annex".

== History ==
Muzon National High School was formerly known as 'Noel Ireneo E. Reyes Memorial National High School' and 'Taytay National High School - Muzon Annex.' The school was established in 2009 to accommodate the growing student population in Taytay. Initially, the infrastructure was set up, and the school operated from the second floor of the Talipapa building, located next to the Barangay Muzon hall, because there was no school-owned building at the time—two facilities were still under construction from 2009 to 2011. The first students, called Muzonians, were transferees from Angono National High School . They were 8th graders (K-12 Curriculum) or second-year high school students (Basic Education Curriculum of 2002). The initial faculty consisted of teachers from the school who held classes on the second floor of the Talipapa building. Later, selected teachers from Taytay National High School, the mother school, transferred to help complete the faculty.

During the 2009–2010 school year, Muzon National High School had students from 7th grade (first year), 8th grade (second year), and 9th grade (third year). The school was managed by a teacher-in-charge appointed by DepEd - Rizal, Mr. Nestor V. Capistrano, a former MAPEH department head under the administration of Mr. Morado B. Digma, a former principal of "TayNaHis" (Taytay National High School). Ten professional teachers taught eight subjects, including Filipino, English, Mathematics, Science, Social Studies - AP, Technology Livelihood Education - TLE, Values Education (Edukasyon sa pagpapahalaga), and MAPEH, using various teaching strategies. The student body is approximately 2,414 students of mixed genders on average. The school operated out of the Talipapa building until early 2011. The construction of two new school campuses—Ciudad building along Sapphire Street in Ciudad Grande and Narra building along Narra Street in San Miguel Subdivision—both within Barangay Muzon, was completed in June 2012. These campuses offer accessible locations for junior high school students living in Barangay Muzon and nearby areas of Taytay, Rizal.

As the student population increased, challenges arose. The administration pushed for building new facilities and acquiring books and learning materials to support the curriculum. This improved access to quality junior high school education for local students of Barangay Muzon, aligning with DepEd standards for Filipino youth. In 2011, the school held its first Commencement Exercises for the first graduating class. In subsequent years, graduation and recognition ceremonies have been held annually. Today, Muzon National High School (school ID - 308129) operates under the supervision of the DepEd Division of Rizal, led by the newly appointed School Principal III, Mr. Celestino Alegre Santiago.

== School administration ==
School Heads

Name	Designation	Year
Nestor V. Capistrano	O.I.C to Principal 1	2009 - 2014
Elvira R. Conese	Principal 3	2014
Ma. Asuncion B. Sierra	Principal 1	2015
Jonathan P. Esquierdo	Principal 3	2015 - 2018
Clarita C. Nocon	Principal 3	2018 - 2020
Amihan R. Fenis	Principal 3	2020 - 2025
Celestino A. Santiago	Principal 3	2025–present

== School organization ==
- Supreme Student Government Organization (S.S.G.)
- Muzonian Dance Crew (M.D.C.)
- Y.E.S. program
- Boy Scouts of the Philippines (B.S.P.)
- Girl Scouts of the Philippines (G.S.P.)
- Red Cross Youth (Philippines) Council
- drum and lyre
