= Professional Chess Association of the Philippines =

Professional chess league in the Philippines

Professional Chess Association of the Philippines (PCAP)
- Current season, competition or edition: 2026 Professional Chess Association of the Philippines season
- Sport: Chess
- Founded: 2020
- First season: 2021
- CEO: Michael Angelo Chua
- President: Paul Elauria
- Commissioner: Paul Elauria
- No. of teams: 18
- Country: Philippines
- Most recent champions: 2026 All-Filipino Cup: Pasig City King Pirates
- Most titles: Pasig City King Pirates (5 titles)

The Professional Chess Association of the Philippines (PCAP) is a professional chess league in the Philippines.

== History ==
The Professional Chess Association of the Philippines (PCAP) was formed by Filipino lawyer Paul Elauria who also became the league's first commissioner. The league was launched in 2020, although plans relating to the establishment of the first professional chess league in the Philippines has already been made years ago.

It was formed as a means of livelihood for Filipino chess players, since not all are part of the Philippine national team. It is reportedly the first professional chess league in Southeast Asia with its first season to be held in 2021 with games possibly to be held online due to the COVID-19 pandemic. The league was recognized by the Games and Amusements Board (GAB), a government body which regulates professional sports in the Philippines, in September 2020. PCAP held its first national try out online through on October 17, 2020.

For the inaugural season slated to start early 2021, 24 teams will participate in the league. The first ever draft was held on December 20, 2020.

In March 2021, PCAP secured a sponsorship of the San Miguel Corporation.

The third season shifted to a two conference tournament. The Reinforced Conference was not held.

== Teams ==
There are 18 teams in the PCAP as of the 2026 season, divided into two geographic groups.

North

- Cagayan Kings
- Isabela Knights of Alexander
- Manila AQ Prime Assets
- Manila Indios Bravos
- Pasig City King Pirates
- Quezon City Simba's Tribe
- Quezon City Stallions
- Rizal Batch Towers
- San Juan Predators

South

- Arriba Iriga Oragons
- Bacolod Blitzers
- Camarines Soaring Eagles
- Cebu Niños
- Cavite Spartans (Dasmarinas)
- Laguna 7Lakes
- Mindoro Tamaraws
- Toledo Xignex Trojans
- Zamboanga Sultans

=== Former teams ===
- Antipolo Cobras
- Cagayan De Oro
- Caloocan Loadmanna Knights
- Cebu City Machers
- Cordova Dutchess Dagami Warriors
- Davao Chess Eagles
- Iloilo Kisela Knights
- Laguna Heroes (Cabuyao)
- Lapu-Lapu City Naki Warriors
- Mandaluyong Tigers
- Misamis Occidental Bamboo Knights
- Olongapo Rainbow Team 7
- Pagadian PCL
- Palawan Queens' Gambit
- Surigao Fianchetto Checkmates
- Tacloban Vikings / Pawnmovers

Including teams on a leave of absence

=== Guest teams ===
Domestic teams

- CCE Sunrays (2021)
- Davao Executive Chess Society (2021)
- Koronadal Dream Weavers (2025)
- Manila-AQ Prime Assets (2025)
- Pampanga Checkers (2021)
- Parañaque City-PATTS-UKCC (2025)
- Philippine paralympic chess team (2021)
- Pasig Grassroots Knights (2022, 2024)
- Philippine Executive Chess Association (2022)

Foreign teams

- (China) Peng Cheng Dragons (2021)
- (Malaysia) Penang Blue Panthers (2021)
- (Singapore) Team SinQGApore (2021)
- (Thailand) Double Bishop Bangkok (2021, 2025)

== Format ==
=== Tournaments ===
The PCAP will have three tournaments or conferences in each season namely the All-Filipino, Reinforced and Open Conferences. Participating teams will be geographic-based, and will represent a particular local government unit although all teams will be privately owned. The participating teams will be divided into two geographic conferences or groups, North and South with teams initially playing other sides within their respective groups before playing against each other in inter-league matches in the elimination round.

Conferences (Tournaments)

- All-Filipino
- Reinforced
- Open

=== Players ===
Teams can have eight to ten players under contract; six of them being regular players. Among the regular players two must be rated players, one must be female, one must be senior and two must be homegrown players. All participating players including participants of the PCAP draft must be licensed by the Games and Amusements Board (GAB). A salary cap is imposed to protect the financial viability of the league. For the Reinforced conference, each team can field on foreign player who may fill a slot in all categories except the homegrown category. A rated player may not be recategorized as a homegrown player.

=== Matches ===
Each match in the PCAP include seven boards:

Player category	Boards
Homegrown (born or registered in the same city/town the team represents)	3
Rated	2
Lady	1
Senior (age 60+)	1

In a conference, each team plays twice against other teams within their group, and once against teams outside their group.

== Champions ==
Results by season

Season	Year	Champions		
Season	Year	All-Filipino	Reinforced	Open (Wesley So Cup)
1	2021	Laguna Heroes	Iloilo Kisela Knights	San Juan Predators
2	2022	San Juan Predators	Pasig City King Pirates	Pasig City King Pirates
3	2023	Pasig City King Pirates	Not held	Pasig City King Pirates
4	2024	Manila Indios Bravos	Not held	Manila Indios Bravos
5	2025	Toledo Xignex Trojans	Not held	Manila Loadmanna Knights
6	2026	Pasig City King Pirates	Not held	

== See also ==
- Filipino Chess Championship
