= Raven Sturt =

American chess grandmaster (born 1993)

Personal information
- Born: August 1, 1993 (age 32) Sedona, Arizona, U.S.

Chess career
- Country: United States
- Title: Grandmaster (2022)
- FIDE rating: 2459 (July 2026)
- Peak rating: 2501 (August 2021)

Raven Milos Sturt (born August 1, 1993) is an American chess grandmaster.

== Chess career ==
Sturt grew up in New York City and began playing in tournaments at the age of 8. He was the 2012 New York State Chess Champion.

He helped lead the Bronx High School of Science's chess team in placing first in the 2009 National Scholastic K-12 Chess Tournament in Dallas, Texas.

In October 2015, he defeated grandmaster Wang Hao in an upset in the first round of the Millionaire Chess Open tournament.

In 2017, he received the International Master title. In July 2022, he achieved his final norm to earn the Grandmaster title, which was later finalized in the fall.

== Personal life ==
Sturt graduated from McGill University with a major in economics and a minor in mathematics.
