= Caloocan Loadmanna Knights =

Professional chess club in the Philippines

- Sport: Chess
- Founded: 2020
- League: Professional Chess Association of the Philippines
- Region: North
- Based in: Caloocan
- Owner: Bong Velasco
- Manager: Arnel Batungbakal

The Caloocan Loadmanna Knights a professional chess club which plays in the Professional Chess Association of the Philippines (PCAP) based in Caloocan, Metro Manila.

== History ==
The Caloocan Loadmanna Knights owned by Bong Velasco was formed a few days prior to the start of the inaugural draft for the Professional Chess Association of the Philippines (PCAP). Arnel Batungbakal whose last involvement in chess was two decades ago was tasked to form a competitive team. The Knights topped the North division in the inaugural round of the All-Filipino Conference, ending with an 11-0 record. However they lost two South division teams Iloilo and Negros, and Camarines in the second round. The team also lost in the Armageddon play.
