= Palawan–Albay Queens' Gambit =

Professional chess club in the Philippines

- Sport: Chess
- Founded: 2020
- League: Professional Chess Association of the Philippines
- Region: South
- Location: Palawan and Albay
- Owner: Jojo Mitra
- Head coach: Susan Neri

The Palawan–Albay Queens' Gambit is a professional chess club which plays in the Professional Chess Association of the Philippines (PCAP) associated with the provinces of Palawan and Albay. It is noted for having an all-female roster in a professional league where most players are male.

== History ==
The Palawan Queens' Gambit was formed as a representative team of the province of Palawan at the Professional Chess Association of the Philippines (PCAP), the first professional chess league in the Philippines. Owned by Palawan-based businessman, Jojo Mitra they formed an all-female team, and deliberately picked female players at the inaugural PCAP draft. Palawan employed Susan Neri, daughter of an Aklan-based national master and international arbiter, as their coach who got enticed with the idea of mentoring an all-female team.

By the Open Conference of the 2022 PCAP season, the team's name was changed to the Palawan–Albay Queens' Gambit.

== Roster ==
The following is the Palawan–Albay Queens' Gambit roster for the 2021 PCAP season.

- Marie Antoinette San Diego (WIM)
- Mikee Charlene Suede (WIM)
- Catherine Pereña-Secopito
- Shania Mae Mendoza
- Carmelita Abanes (WNM)
- Cecilia Cuizon (WNM)
- Marife Dela Torre*
- Yanika Eli Seratubias*
- Jesibel Maberit*
- (*) Homegrown players

Coach: Susan Neri

== Team image ==
The Palawan–Albay Queens' Gambit is named after the Netflix series, The Queen's Gambit which features a female protagonist. The team features an all-female lineup as a means to give more opportunities for women in the Philippines to play competitive chess.
