= Casimiro A. Ynares Sr, Memorial National High School =

Public high school in Rizal, Philippines

Casimiro A. Ynares Sr. Memorial National High School
- Official logo of CAYSMNHS

Location
- Cabrera Road, KayTikling, Barangay Dolores; Taytay, Rizal; Philippines
- Coordinates: 14°34′27″N 121°08′53″E

Information
- School type: Public school
- Motto: "Ang Batang Casimiro, Disiplinado"
- Established: 2005
- Sister school: Taytay National High School
- Principal: Virgilio P. Ramos
- Grades: 7 to 12
- Language: English and Filipino
- Colors: Blue, Violet and Gray
- Song: CAYS Memorial National Hymn
- Newspaper: "The Echoes"; "Ang Sipol"
- Affiliation: Republic of the Philippines; Department of Education; Region IV-A; Division of Rizal
- Abbreviation: CAYSMNHS
- Website: CAYS Website

Casimiro A. Ynares Sr. Memorial National High School (also known as CAYSMNHS) is a public high school in Taytay, Rizal. situated at the Rizal Provincial Lot Hilltop, Cabrera Road, KayTikling, Barangay Dolores, Taytay, Rizal. Its mother school is Taytay National High School. The school is now an independent public secondary school. It offers a specialized curriculum specifically in English, Science, Mathematics, and ICT. The school is currently rolling out the new K-12 BEC program for students starting the school year 2012–2013. The school also has planned to carry out the new SHS program that will start in the school year 2016–2017 but out of all 3 choices for the new program, they will be implementing the Academics area of the curriculum.

== History ==
Casimiro A. Ynares Sr. Memorial National High School is situated at the Rizal Provincial lot in Hilltop, Cabrera Road, Kaytikling, Taytay, Rizal. It has a total lot area of 4260 square meters which was donated by the Rizal Provincial Government through Gov. Casimiro Ynares Jr.

In 2002, the original plan was to build a three-storey building with 12 classrooms at Hapay na Mangga across the existing Hapay na Mangga Elementary School with a lot area of 3.5 hectares slope site. However, the project did not materialize due to a landslide that affected many residents in the area. Governor Rebecca Ynares offered instead a provincial lot located between the Rizal Provincial Jail and Provincial PNP Headquarters beside the DepEd Division of Rizal Office as the new site of the school.

In 2004, through the initiative of People's Economic Council, the barangay officials of Barangay Dolores headed by former Barangay Captain Magtanggol E. Macabuhay Jr., and the municipal officials of Taytay through the leadership of Mayor George Ricardo R. Gacula, the construction of the four-storey building with 15 rooms started. It was turned over to DepEd Rizal with Dr. Edith A. Doblada, the School's Division Superintendent of the Division of Rizal during that time.

Mrs. Cynthia M. Cruz, the principal of Taytay National High School, processed the construction of the building and the opening of classes in June 2005. The school operation started in June 2004 through the supervision of Mrs. Loida Alcantara, the newly installed principal of Taytay National High School. The school was then regarded as an annex school of Taytay National High School catering students from Hapay na Mangga and other places near the school. Mrs. Nenita N. de Leon, department head of Mathematics in TNHS, served as the first officer-in-charge. Six teachers were also borrowed from TNHS: Mrs. Viernalyn M. Nama, Ms. Ma. Theresa Punzalan, Mrs. Elisa Regino, Mrs. Emily Ocampo, Mrs. Mercedes Mendenilla and Mr. Alejandro Jose. On its first year of operation, the school has a total enrollment of 212 students classified as Pilot and Regular sections.

Later, the school was eventually considered an independent school and named "Casimiro A. Ynares Sr. Memorial National High School" in honor of Casimiro A. Ynares Sr., the father of the then governor of Rizal, Casimiro Ynares Jr.

The first teacher in charge was Mrs. Marlene R. Nepomuceno, a master teacher in math from Malaya, Pililla, Rizal.

In May 2006, Mrs. Gloria C. Roque became the first full-fledged principal of CAYSMNHS.

On July 17, 2011, Dr. Maribeth R. de Dios, principal of Don Jose Ynares Memorial National High School, assumed office and became the principal of CAYSMNHS after Mrs. Roque. The school used an enhanced curriculum focused on English, Science, Math, and Information and Communication Technology (ICT) subjects. Being a Special Education (SpEd) advocate, she took the initiatives of opening the school's door to students with special needs. The first Special Education class was opened in the school year 2012–2013 catering the hearing impaired students and students with learning disabilities.

On September 16, 2013, Mr. Magno R. Abueme, a master teacher from Francisco P. Felix Memorial National High School, officially took over Dr. de Dios. Being a neophyte in this field, his projects were to improve Dr. de Dios' programs, maintain cleanliness and orderliness, and lessen school-based activities to enhance the academic performance of students.

Since 2005, 5 more school buildings were built. A Ynares-type Multi-Purpose covered court was constructed and inaugurated on March 26, 2014.

In 2015, CAYSMNHS celebrated its 10th year as an academic institution.

== Principals ==
Name	Year
Gloria C. Roque	2006 - 2011
Maribeth R. de Dios	2011 - 2013
Magno R. Abueme	2013 - 2018
Ma. Asuncion C. Sierra	2018 - 2023
Michael A. Garrovillas	2023 - 2024
Virgilio P. Ramos	2024–present
