= Oliver Barbosa =

Filipino chess grandmaster (born 1986)

Personal information
- Born: September 29, 1986 (age 39) Pasig, Philippines

Chess career
- Country: Philippines
- Title: Grandmaster (2011)
- Peak rating: 2596 (May 2012)

Oliver Barbosa (born September 29, 1986) is a Filipino chess grandmaster. He earned his International Master title in 2008 and his grandmaster title in 2011. Barbosa won the 10th Parsvnath International Grandmasters Tournament in New Delhi, with 9.5/11 and an astounding Tournament Performance Rating (TPR) of 2710. By winning the said tournament, he also raised his ELO Live Rating from 2573 to 2627 as he gained 53.8 ELO rating points. He earned his first GM norm in the Asian Individual in Mashad, Iran and his second norm in the Philippines National Championships. In 2014, he tied for 1st–2nd with Francisco Vallejo Pons in the Thailand Open Chess Championship.

He has trained with Wesley So and John Paul Gomez. These days, he coaches kids at the Speyer School.

== Chess career ==
=== World Junior Chess Championship ===
GM Barbosa joined the 43rd edition of the World Junior Chess Championship held at Kochi, Kerala, India in 2004 won by Indian GM Pentala Harikrishna. The then untitled Barbosa but with an ELO of 2311 (36th seed among 72 players) tied for 15th-21st places eventually ending up in 19th place after tie-breaks just behind compatriot Mark Paragua who placed 18th. Barbosa and Paragua both scored 7.5/13 posting identical records of 6 wins, 3 draws and 4 losses with Barbosa posting a TPR of 2423.

=== FIDE World Cup ===
Barbosa took part in the 2013 Tromsø, Norway Chess World Cup where he was seeded No. 100 with his ELO Rating of 2572. He met Vietnam's Super GM Lê Quang Liêm (seeded 29) who defeated him 2–0 in the Round of 128. He was joined in this tournament by fellow Filipinos Super GM Wesley So (2708) who was still representing the Philippines and GM Mark Paragua (2569).

=== Men's Olympiad ===
Barbosa played in the 40th Chess Olympiad where he manned Board 2 due to his 2nd-best ELO of 2554 and scored 7/11 (63.6% winning rate), with an overall TPR of 2668. He posted 5 wins, 4 draws and 2 losses.

=== Asian Individual Chess Championship ===
GM Barbosa was a participant in four (4) consecutive editions of the Asian Individual Chess Championship also known as the Asian Continental Championship, from 2010 to 2013 where he has already scored 22.5/36 broken down as follows: 16 wins, 13 draws and 7 losses for a 62.5% winning percentage copping a silver medal in the 2013 Manila edition.:

Event	ELO Rating	Result / # of Participants	Record	TPR
Subic Bay Freeport Zone Asian Chess Championship (8th) 2010	2452	5.0/9 (31st/90)	+4 =2 -3	2509
Mashhad Asian Chess Championship (9th) 2011	2506	5.0/9 (13th/50)	+2 =6 -1	2606
Ho Chi Minh City Asian Chess Championship (10th) 2012	2550	6.0/9 (5th/72)	+5 =2 -2	2640
Subic Bay Freeport Zone Asian Chess Championship (11th) 2013	2566	6.5/9 (Silver/77)	+5 =3 -1	2605

=== Asian Cities Chess Championship ===
Barbosa also played in the 18th edition of the Asian Cities Chess Championship held in Tagaytay City, Cavite, Philippines where he manned Board 1 for Team Tagaytay and scored 7.0/9, second-best for the team behind GM John Paul Gomez, going undefeated with 5 wins and 4 draws for a high 77.8% winning rate. He had a very high TPR of 2680 way higher than his ELO then of 2567 on the way to securing the bronze medal among Board 1 participants. He led the team to the gold medal in the team competitions.

=== PRO Chess League ===
Barbosa took part in the 2018 and 2019 editions of the PRO Chess League for the Montclair Sopranos:

- In the 2018 edition, Barbosa played four (4) games scoring 2.0/4 games with wins over IMs Maximiliano Perez and Mario Villanueva but lost to IM German Della Morte and Andres Carlos Obregón in their match against the Argentina Krakens.
- In the 2019 edition, Barbosa played 8 games scoring 3.0 points recording 2 wins, 2 draws and 4 losses. He won against GM Djurabek Khamrakulov of the New York Marshalls and IM Shiyam Thavandiran of the Montreal Chessbrahs but lost to Grant Xu (New York Marshalls), GM Anton Demchenko (New York Marshalls), IM Krishna G V Sai (Montreal Chessbrahs) and IM Nikolay Noritsyn (Montreal Chessbrahs). He drew his games opposite GM Sergei Azarov (Montreal Chessbrahs) and GM Ivan Šarić (Montreal Chessbrahs).

=== Bangkok Chess Club Open and Blitz ===
Barbosa took part in the 2013 and 2014 editions of the Bangkok Chess Club (BCC) Open where he registered good results: tying for 2nd-7th places in the 13th (2013) BCC Chess Open alongside fellow Filipino GM Darwin Laylo among others; and 2nd place in the 14th (2014) BCC Chess Open behind eventual winner GM Francisco Vallejo Pons of Spain who won the title after the tie-breaks as both scored 7.5/9.

Barbosa has won the Bangkok Chess Club (BCC) Open Blitz for two (2) years running, in 2013 (13th BCC Blitz) and 2014 (14th BCC Blitz). In the 13th BCC Blitz, he edged out Chinese GM Lu Shanglei on better tie-breaks as both scored 12.0 points in 14 games. In the 2014 edition, Barbosa was a clear winner with a score of 12.0/14, 1.5 points clear of Polish GM Bartosz Soćko.

=== Other notable tournaments ===
Barbosa copped first place in the 6th Kolkata Open (also called the 19th International Open Grandmasters Chess) held from March 18–27, 2014 at Gorky, Sadan, Kolkata, West Bengal, India where he ended up tied with GM Lalith Babu of India both with 7.5/10 but won the title due to superior tie-breaks (56.5-55.0) where he registered a TPR of 2688. He went unbeaten registering 5 wins and 5 draws and gained 15.8 ELO rating points. Among his wins were against Super GM Levan Pantsulaia of Georgia (2606) in Round 7 and Russian Super GM Konstantin Landa (2645) in Round 9.

Barbosa took part in the 3rd Millionaire Chess Open that took place at Harrah's Resort, Atlantic City from October 6–10, 2016. Barbosa ended up in a tie for 7th-16th places where he ultimately ended up in 13th place scoring 5.0/7 (+5 =0 -2) which did not qualify him for the next round.

In 2017, Barbosa took part in the 45th Annual World Open held from June 29 – July 4, 2017 in Philadelphia, where he landed in the top ten finishing in a tie for 7th place with a score of 6.5/9. It was the highest place achieved so far by a Filipino chess player in the annual Open. He could have won the overall title as he was tied with the eventual winner GM Tigran L. Petrosian of Armenia going into their last round match. However, he lost against Petrosian who went on to win the title with a score of 7.5/9. His victory in the penultimate round against countryman and fellow GM Julio Sadorra proved to be a factor as it ended at 4 p.m. while his last round match against Petrosian started immediately at 4:30 p.m.

Barbosa won the 6th Washington Int 2017 held from August 12–16, 2017 at Rockville, USA with a score of 7.0/9 bagging the US$4,400 first prize along the way. He was a half point ahead of joint second-placers GMs Joshua Friedel and Eugene Perelshteyn, both of the US, and IM Kaiqi Yang of China, all with 6.5 points.

Barbosa participated in the 103rd ch-Marshall CC 2019 held from November 14–18, 2019 in New York where he ended up in a tie for 4th-5th places with IM Raven Sturt eventually placing 5th with a score of 5.0/9 where he posted 3 wins, 4 draws and 2 losses with a TPR of 2520 in this Category 10 tournament with an ELO average of 2482.

In 2018, GM Barbosa won the 48th Continental Open.

In 2019, Barbosa won the 141st New York State Championship held from August 30 – September 2, 2019, at the Albany Marriott, 189 Wolf Road, Albany, New York. He scored 5.0/6 registering 4 wins and 2 draws and won the first prize amounting to US$2,100.00. He actually led a 1-2 finish by Filipinos in this tournament as GM Mark Paragua won the runner-up honors via tie-break although those who tied for 2nd-4th places all won US$600.00 each.
