= 2020 Professional Chess Association of the Philippines draft =

General information
- Sport: Chess
- Date(s): December 20, 2020
- Location: Quezon City Sports Club, Quezon City

Overview
- 96 total selections in 4 rounds
- League: Professional Chess Association of the Philippines
- First selection: Eugene Torre (Rizal Towers)

The 2020 Professional Chess Association of the Philippines draft was held on December 20, 2020 at the Quezon City Sports Club.

It is the first-ever draft held by the Professional Chess Association of the Philippines (PCAP). The draft was held to determine the initial composition of PCAP's 24 teams for its inaugural 2021 season.

The draft had around 350 applicants. The draft lasted around four hours and had four rounds.

Grandmaster Eugene Torre was the first pick of the draft. The Rizal Towers selected Torre to play for them.

== Draft order ==
All 24 teams of PCAP participated in the draft, with the draft order determined through the drawing of lots. Antipolo was drawn as the first team to select a player in the draft but they made a deal with 7th team Rizal Towers to swap places in the first round in order for Rizal to be able to select Eugene Torre. Torre is a friend of the Rizal Towers owner, Ed Madrid.

Draft order	Team	Group
1st	Antipolo Cobras	North
2nd	Iloilo Kisela Knights	South
3rd	Team Quezon City	North
4th	Team Iriga	South
5th	Negros Kingsmen	South
6th	Cordova Dutchess Dagami Warriors	South
7th	Rizal Batch Towers	North
8th	San Juan Predators	North
9th	Mindoro Tamaraws	South
10th	Lapu-Lapu City Naki Warriors	South
11th	Surigao Fianchetto Checkmates	South
12th	Manila Indios Bravos	North
13th	Camarines Soaring Eagles	South
14th	Olongapo Rainbow Team 7	North
15th	Team Cabuyao	North
16th	Toledo City Chess Miners	South
17th	Cagayan Kings	North
18th	Zamboanga Sultans	South
19th	Cavite Spartans	North
20th	Isabela Knight Raiders	North
21st	Cebu City Machers	South
22nd	Caloocan Loadmanna Knights	North
23rd	Pasig City King Pirates	North
24th	Palawan Queens' Gambit	North

== Draft selection ==
=== First round ===
Pick	Player	Title	Team
1	Eugene Torre	GM	Antipolo Cobras (traded to Rizal (Note: December 20, 2020: Antipolo Cobras to Rizal Batch Towers: Rizal acquired Antipolo's first-round pick (No. 1 - Eugene Torre); Antipolo acquired Rizal's first-round pick (No. 7 - Jose Aquino)))
2	Joey Antonio	GM	Iloilo Kisela Knights
3	Michaela Concio	–	Team Quezon City
4	Glenn Altuz	NM	Team Iriga
5	Joel Pimintel	IM	Negros Kingsmen
6	Edsel Montoya	–	Cordova Dutchess Dagami Warriors
7	Jose Aquino	–	Rizal Batch Towers (traded to Antipolo)
8	Ricky de Guzman	IM	San Juan Predators
9	David Elorta	NM	Mindoro Tamaraws
10	Merben Roque	NM	Lapu-Lapu City Naki Warriors
11	Vince Alaan	FM	Surigao Fianchetto Checkmates
12	Julio Sadorra	GM	Manila Indios Bravos
13	Mark Paragua	GM	Camarines Soaring Eagles
14	Jefer Embuido	NM	Olongapo Rainbow Team 7
15	John Paul Gomez	GM	Team Cabuyao
16	Rico Mascarinas	IM	Toledo City Chess Miners
17	Jake Tumaliwan	–	Cagayan Kings
18	Chito Garma	IM	Zamboanga Sultans
19	Marlon Bernardino	NM	Cavite Spartans
20	Joel Balico	FM	Isabela Knight Raiders
21	Elwin Retanal	NM	Cebu City Machers
22	Paolo Barsamina	IM	Caloocan Loadmanna Knights
23	Darwin Laylo	GM	Pasig City King Pirates
24	Shania Mae Mendoza	–	Palawan Queens' Gambit

Source: Spin.ph

== Trades involving draft picks ==
=== Draft-day trades ===
Draft-day trades were made on December 20, 2020, the day of the draft.
