= Libid, Binangonan =

Mainland barangay and poblacion in the Philippines

Libid
- Mainland Barangay
- Poblacion of Libid
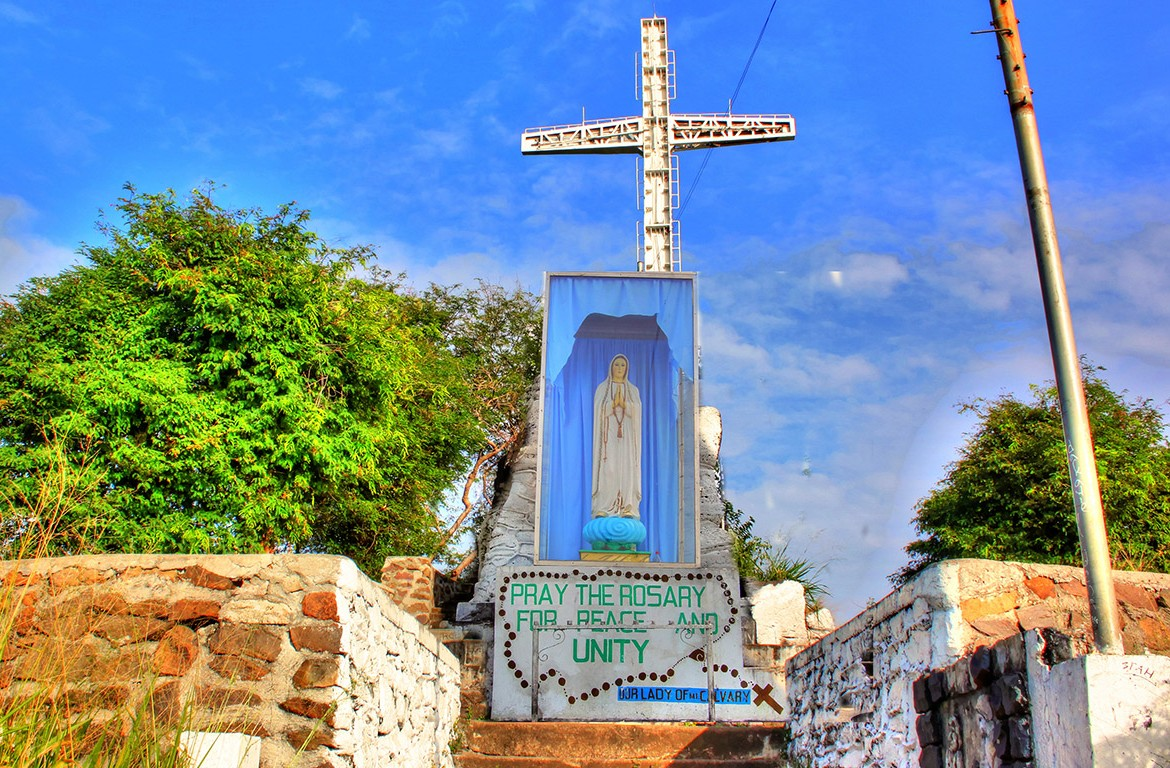
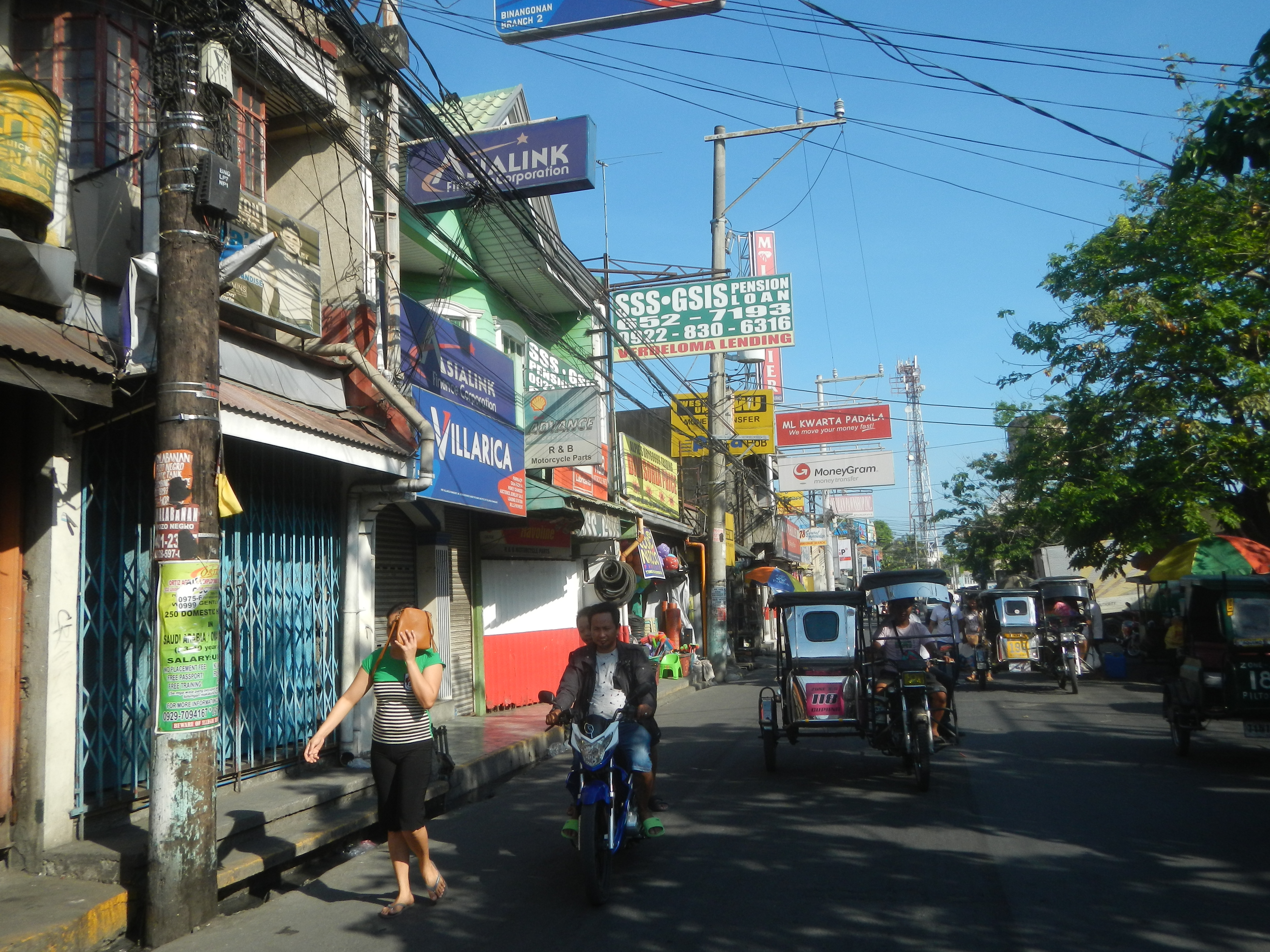
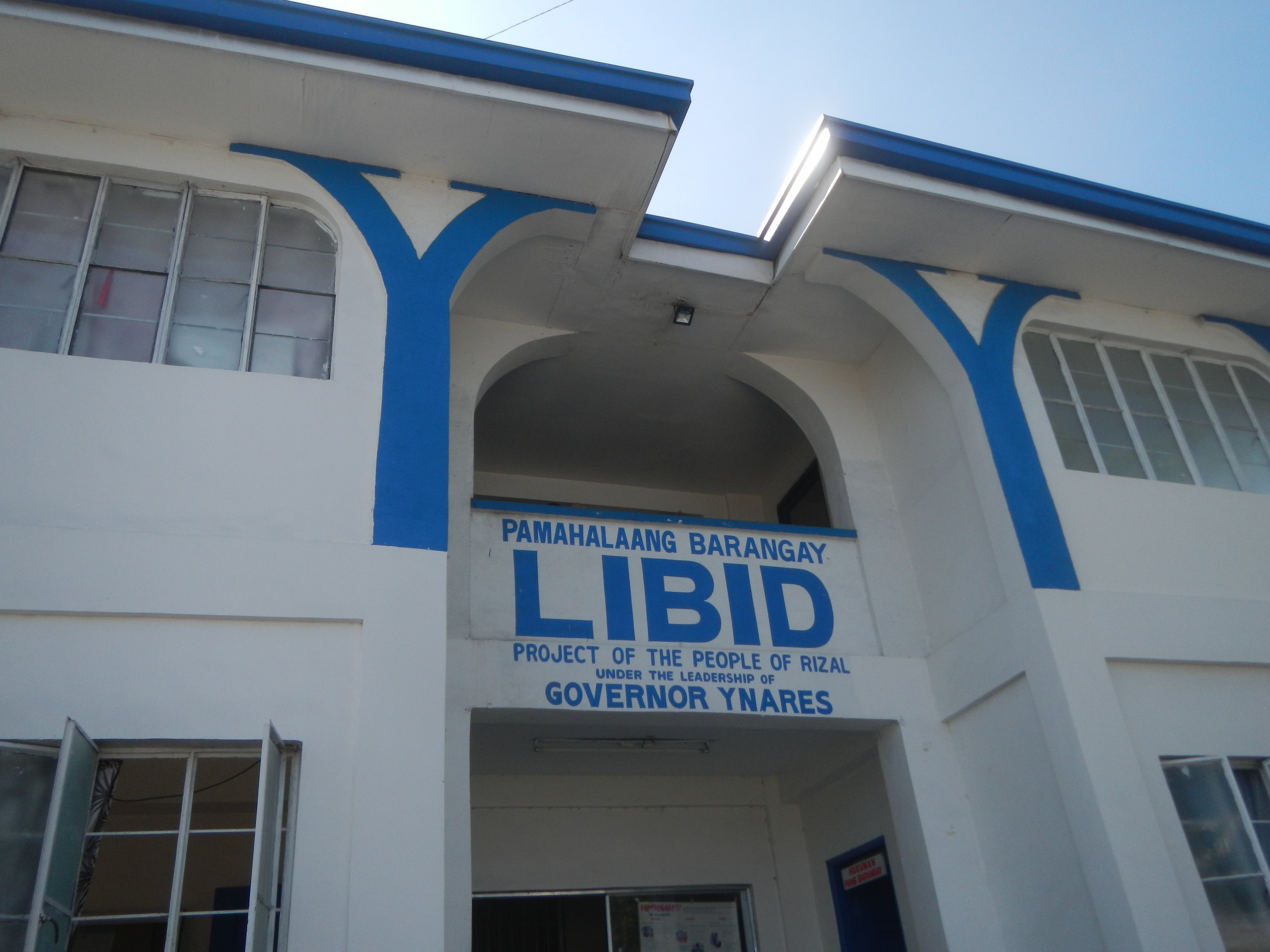
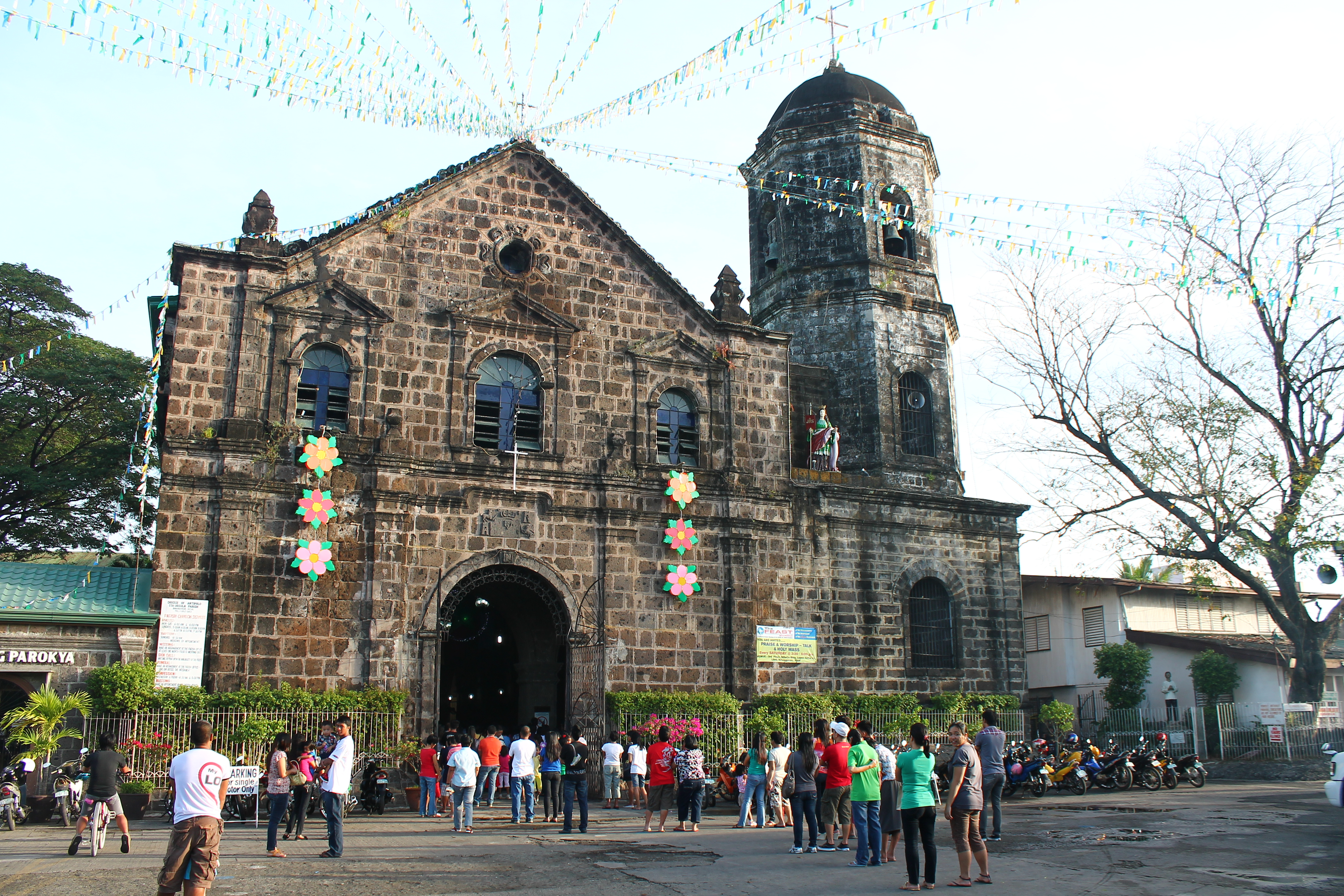
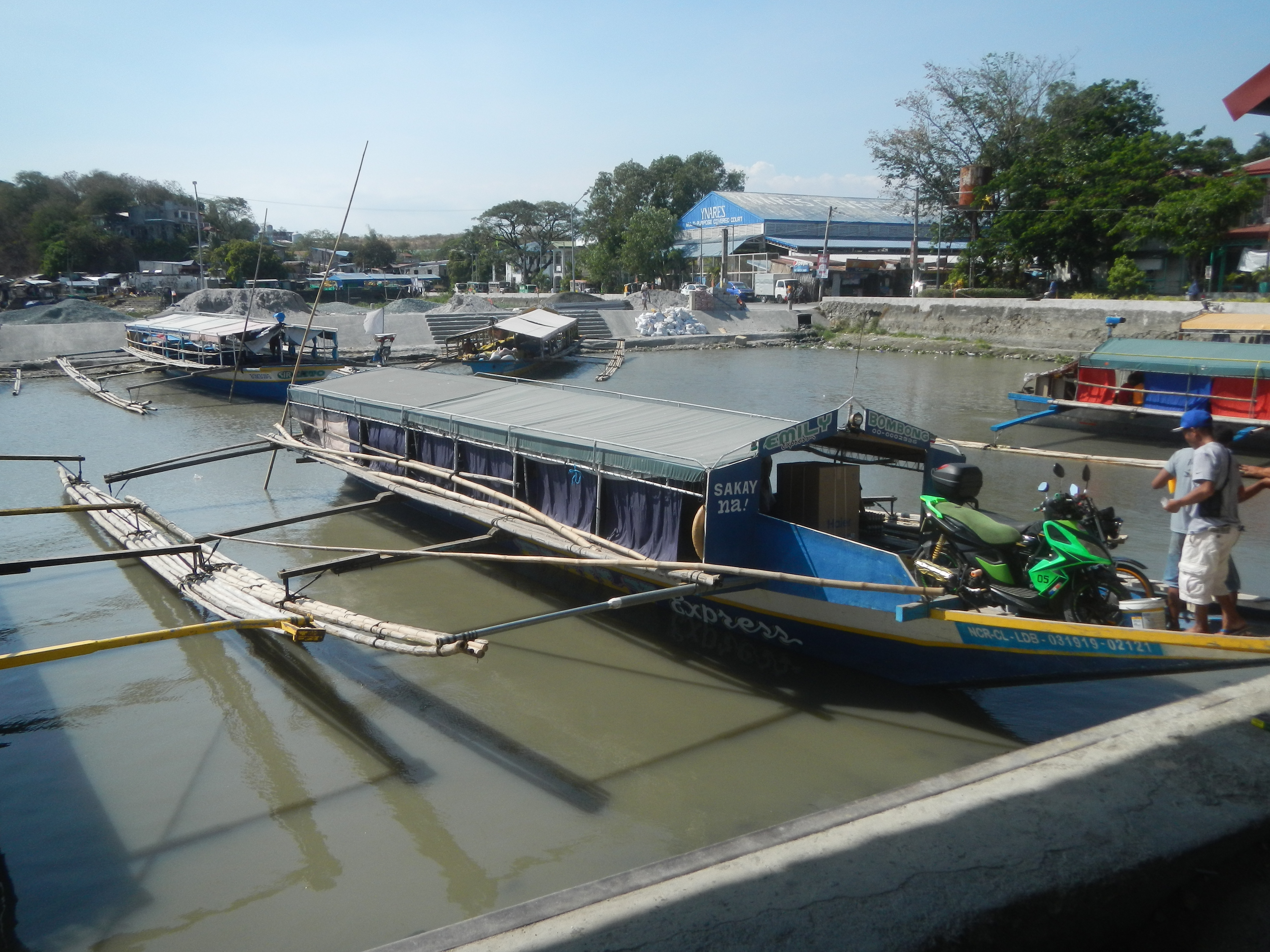
- Ang Kalbaryo Town Proper Barangay Hall Santa Ursula Parish Church Wharf Proper at Fish Port

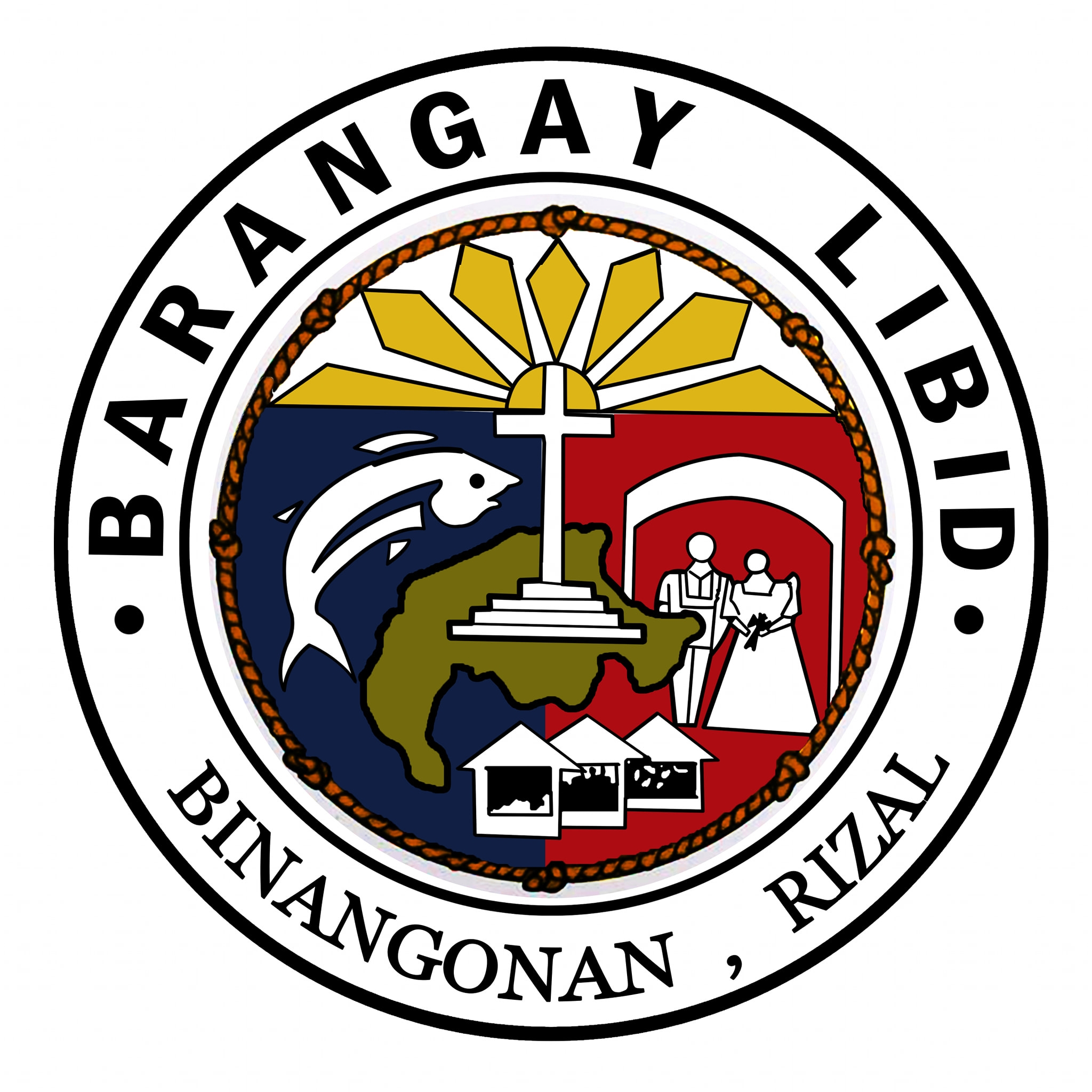
- Seal
- Nickname: Heart of the Poblacion
- Location of Libid in the Philippines
- Coordinates: 14°27′45.7″N 121°11′35.2″E
- Country: Philippines
- Region: Region IV-A, Calabarzon
- Municipality: Binangonan, Rizal
- Barangay: Libid
- Seat: Barangay Hall

Government
  - Barangay captain: Hon. Gil C. Anore

Area
  - Land: 2.53 km^{2} (0.98 sq mi)
- Elevation: 5.3 m (17 ft)

Population (2020)
  - Total: 8,068
  - Density: 3,188.93/km^{2} (8,259.3/sq mi)
- Time zone: UTC+8 (PST)
- ZIP code: 1940

Libid, officially Barangay Libid is one of the mainland barangays and part of the poblacion of Binangonan, in the province of Rizal. It is also regarded as one of the main urban areas or propers of Binangonan, along with Layunan and Libis. Its population as determined by the 2010 census was 7,085. By the 2020 census, it had increased to 8,068, representing 2.57% of the total population of Binangonan.

== History ==
During the Spanish colonial period, the town head was known as the capitán, and the seat of government, the tribunal, was located in Libid, regarded as the "heart of the poblacion". The second highest town official was the teniente mayor, followed by the teniente de ganado, whose main responsibility was to register carabaos, horses, and other livestock while also collecting related fees and taxes. The teniente de montera oversaw real estate matters within the municipality. In 1772, a Spanish priest from Aliaga, Pampanga, requested the local captain to send delinquent taxpayers to work on the construction of the church (Santa Ursula Parish Church). Male delinquent taxpayers were assigned to the project until its completion in 1800. During this period, local accounts claimed that a cross in the Mount Calvary (Ang Kalbaryo) area of Libid grew out of the hill's summit.

== Demographics ==
According to the 2015 Census, Libid had a population of 7,089 people in 1,550 households, or an average of 4.57 members per household. The largest age group was 20 to 24 years old, with 706 individuals, while the smallest was 80 years and older, with 46 individuals. The population of Libid increased from 5,796 in 1990 to 8,068 in 2020, reflecting a growth of 2,272 people over 30 years. The 2020 Census recorded a population of 8,068, representing an annual growth rate of 2.76 percent, or an increase of 979 people since 2015.

== Education ==
Libid has only one public elementary school, Libid Elementary School. It also has two private schools such as Right Step School of Learning and PBTS Academy Inc.

== Festivals ==
The Libid Grand Santacruzan is an annual parade held every May during the feast of the Holy Cross in Libid. The event reenacts the search and discovery of the True Cross by Queen Helena (Reina Elena) and Constantine (Prinsipe Constantino). The tradition was introduced in 1975 by Gomer Celestial of Libid, with celebrities and models initially participating as Reina Elena and Emperatriz.

== Tourism ==
=== Santa Ursula Parish Church (Binangonan Church) ===
The Santa Ursula Parish Church, located in Libid, is a Roman Catholic church constructed between 1792 and 1800. Considered one of the oldest religious structures in Binangonan, it has undergone several renovations, including a major reconstruction in 1853, while retaining elements of its original design. In 2025, it was designated as one of the Jubilee Pilgrim Churches in the Philippines.

=== Mount Calvary (Ang Kalbaryo) ===
Mount Calvary, locally known as Ang Kalbaryo, is situated in Libid and serves as a pilgrimage site in Binangonan. The site features approximately 288 steps leading to a summit marked by a large cross, where devotees conduct prayers and reflections, particularly during Holy Week.

== Location ==
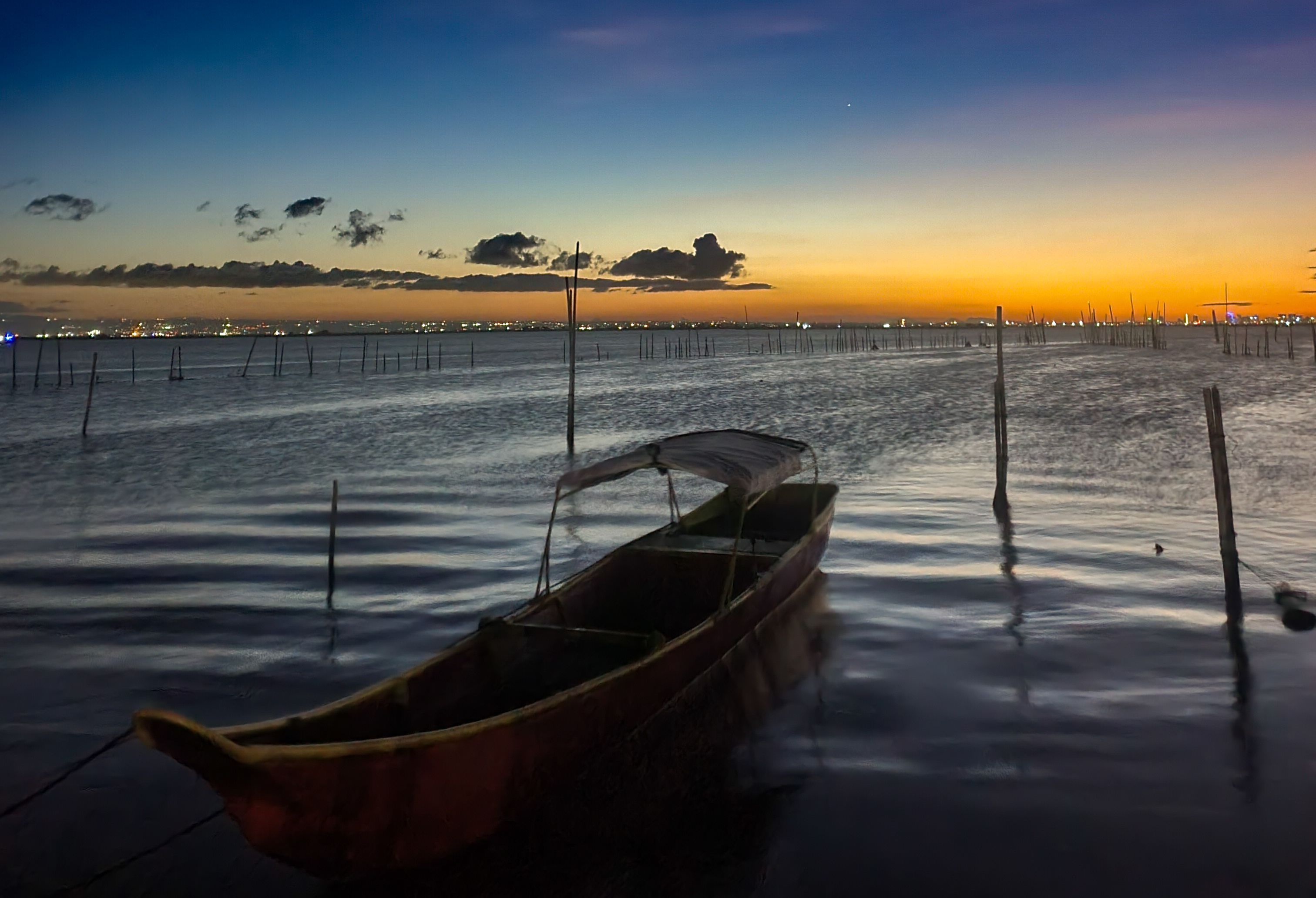
A boat anchored near the shores of Laguna de Bay

Libid is a mainland proper in Binangonan and situated approximately 36 kilometers from Manila and 21 kilometers from Pasig, nestled between the Sierra Madre foothills and Laguna de Bay. Libid borders the following barangays: Lunsad and Libis to the south, Mahabang Parang to the east, Batingan and Layunan to the northeast, and Calumpang to the west.

== See also ==
- Mambog, Binangonan
- Layunan, Binangonan
- Batingan, Binangonan
