= Video games in the Philippines =

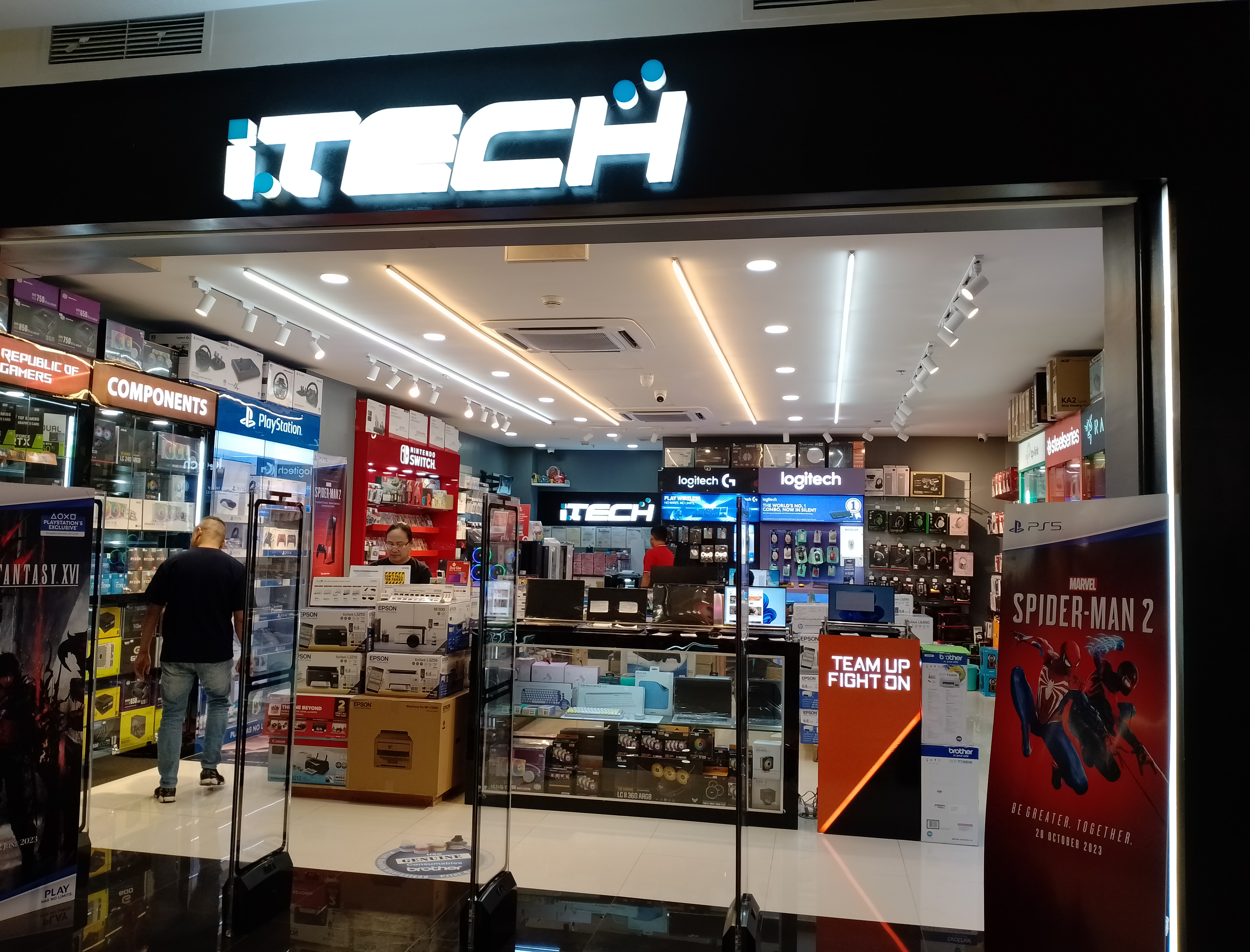
iTech store at Ayala Center Cebu

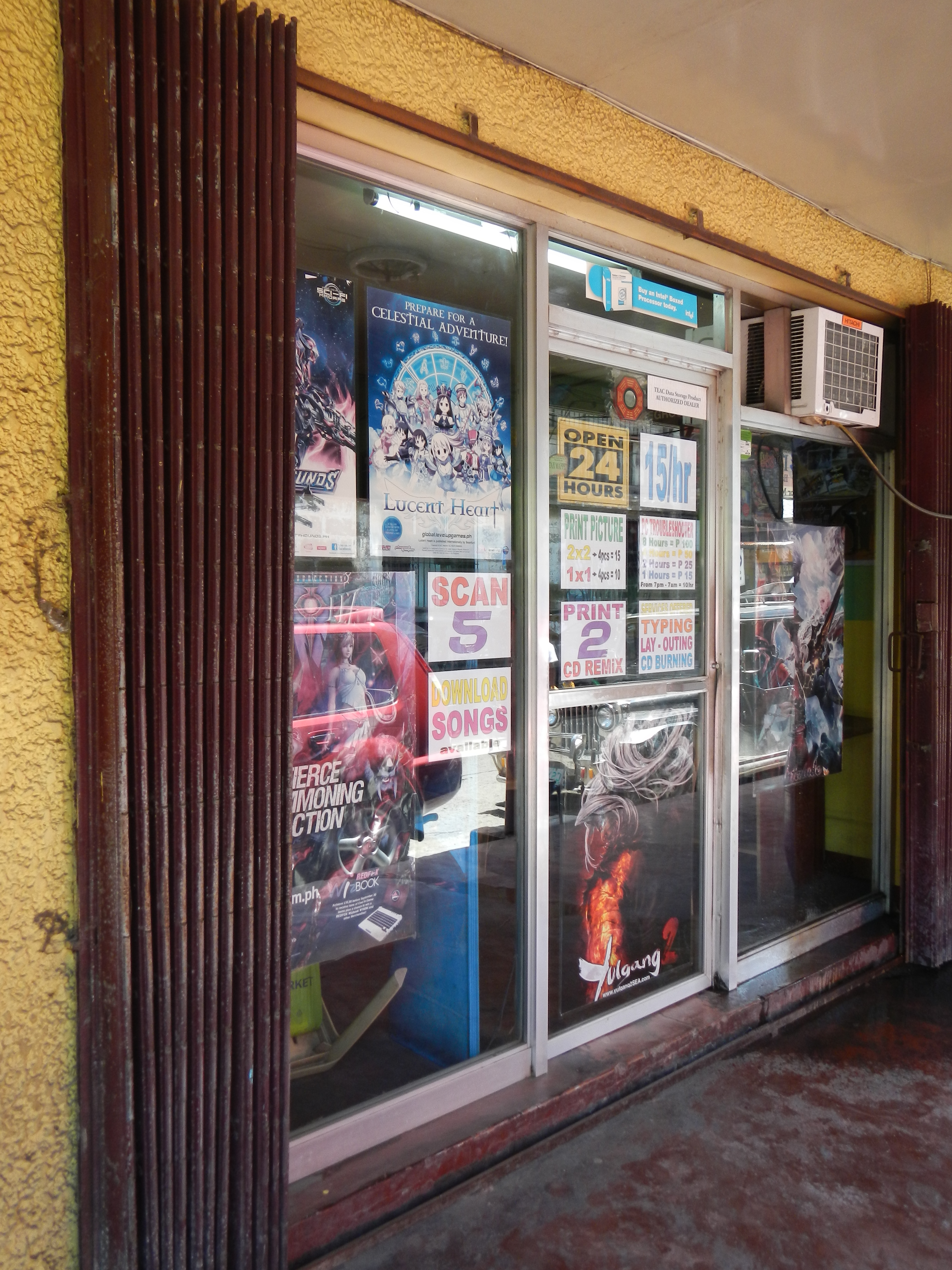
An internet café in Baliwag, Bulacan with posters of MMORPGs

Video gaming in the Philippines is an emerging industry and pastime that includes the production, sale, distribution, and playing of video games. People who enjoy this pastime in the Philippines typically do so on their smartphones or in internet cafes. While the Philippines is a minor player in the video game development industry, trends show that the population of people who play video games in the Philippines is very high compared to other countries and is expected to continue growing.

== Demographics ==
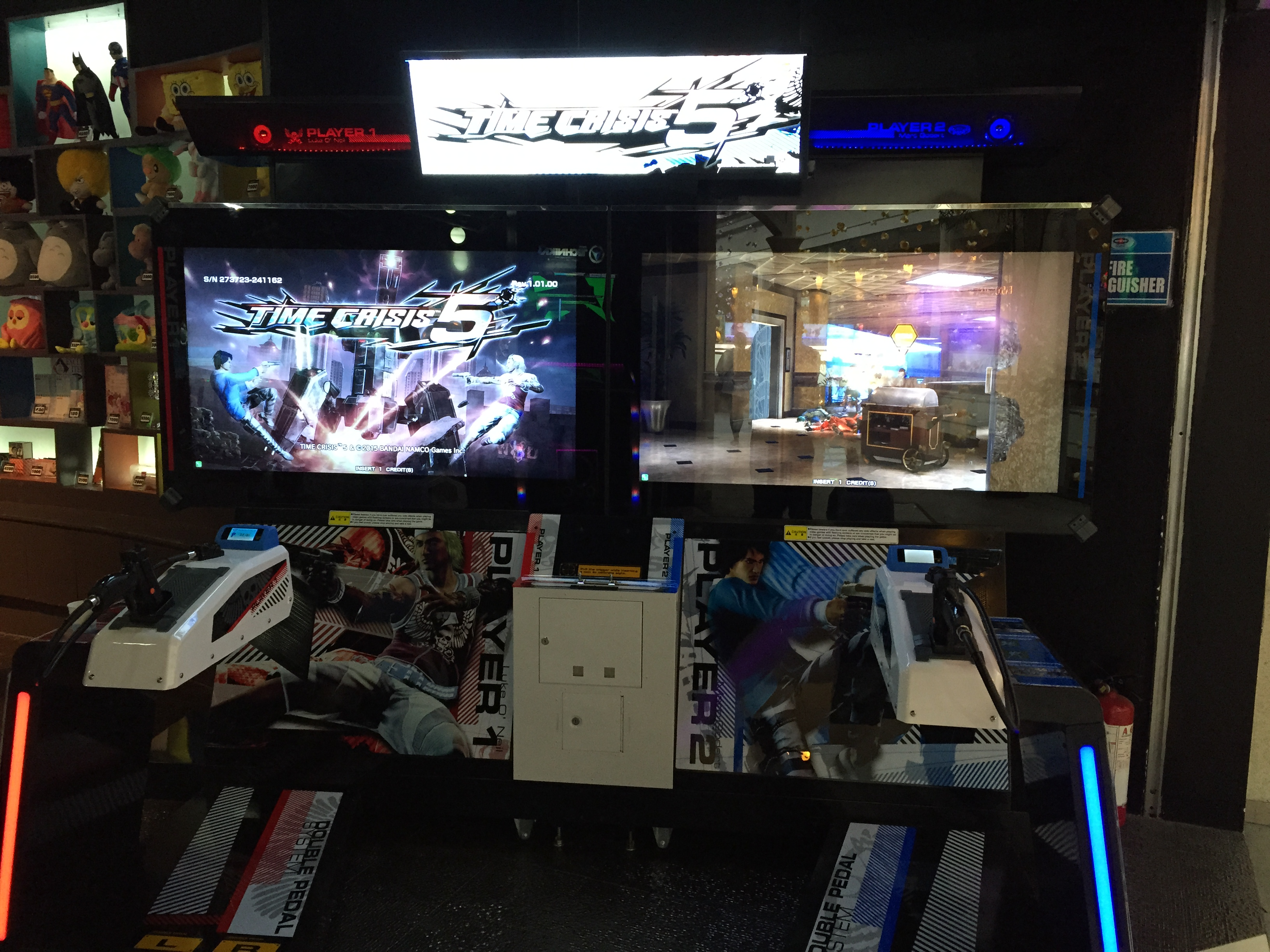
An arcade video game in Makati.

The Philippines' video game player base is very populated in the Philippines, with reports in 2023 finding that approximately 95% of people who use the internet play video games. The devices used to access video games on the internet are mainly smartphones, ranking at the top with 98% of video game players followed by a large gap with the second most popular device, laptops or desktops, at 50% of video game players. These high percentages paired with the Philippines' population density led to the Philippines ranking 6th out of 49 countries studied in time spent playing video games in 2024.

This distribution of devices is likely due to the accessibility of mobile phones compared to PCs. Before smartphones became more widespread in the Philippines, internet cafes were the hub of gaming communities. With home internet not being very reliable or fast, having an average speed of 5.5 Mbps in the Philippines compared to South Korea's 28.6 Mbps, Filipinos used internet cafes to fulfill their technological needs such as video calling or gaming. However, in recent years due to smartphones having more features and being cheaper to produce, smartphones became the most common device for fulfilling tasks that require technology instead of computers. The video game industry has taken note of this trend in the Philippines, with the most popular games in the Philippines being mobile games.

== Game development industry ==
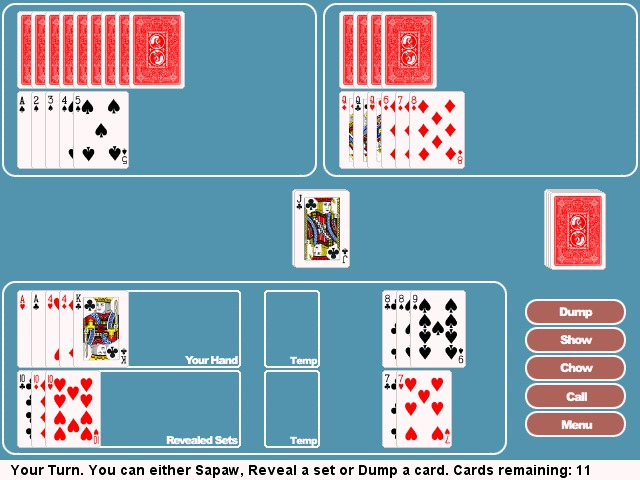
Tong-its game released in November 2003 by Rico Zuñiga

The Philippines is a minor player regarding the game development industry. In 2011, it was reported that the local industry only has a 0.02% market share of the $90 billion global industry. The majority of the game development industry is focused on outsourcing to foreign companies rather than creation of local content. According to the Game Developers Association of the Philippines (GDAP), there are about 4,000 professionals representing about 60 companies involved in the game development industry as of 2013. The Philippines' primary competitors in this field are China, Singapore, Malaysia and Vietnam.

The first Filipino-developed commercial computer game was Anito: Defend a Land Enraged which was released in November 2003. 2 months prior to the release of Anito, in September 2003, a free and open source Solitaire card game named Drac was also released by Rico Zuñiga, which makes Drac the first Filipino-developed computer game and game development framework. Drac was also used to create another card game based on the rules of the popular Filipino game, Tong-its which was released in November 2003.

In 2016 the French video game development company Ubisoft announced plans to establish a subsidiary in the country, which opened on March 28, 2016, in Santa Rosa, Laguna in partnership with De La Salle University.

The University of The Visayas New School (UVNS) offers esports and game development through their Senior High Arts and Design track. UVNS offers subjects like game theory, mechanics, strategy, and game awareness. Students can also pick up game design, branding, and shoutcasting as well as entrepreneurship.

After the return qualification of two Filipino teams for the world DOTA 2 tournament in 2017, esports backers like Sen. Bam Aquino see the potential of the online gaming industry to bring honor to the country while creating jobs and ushering in investments.

== In esports ==
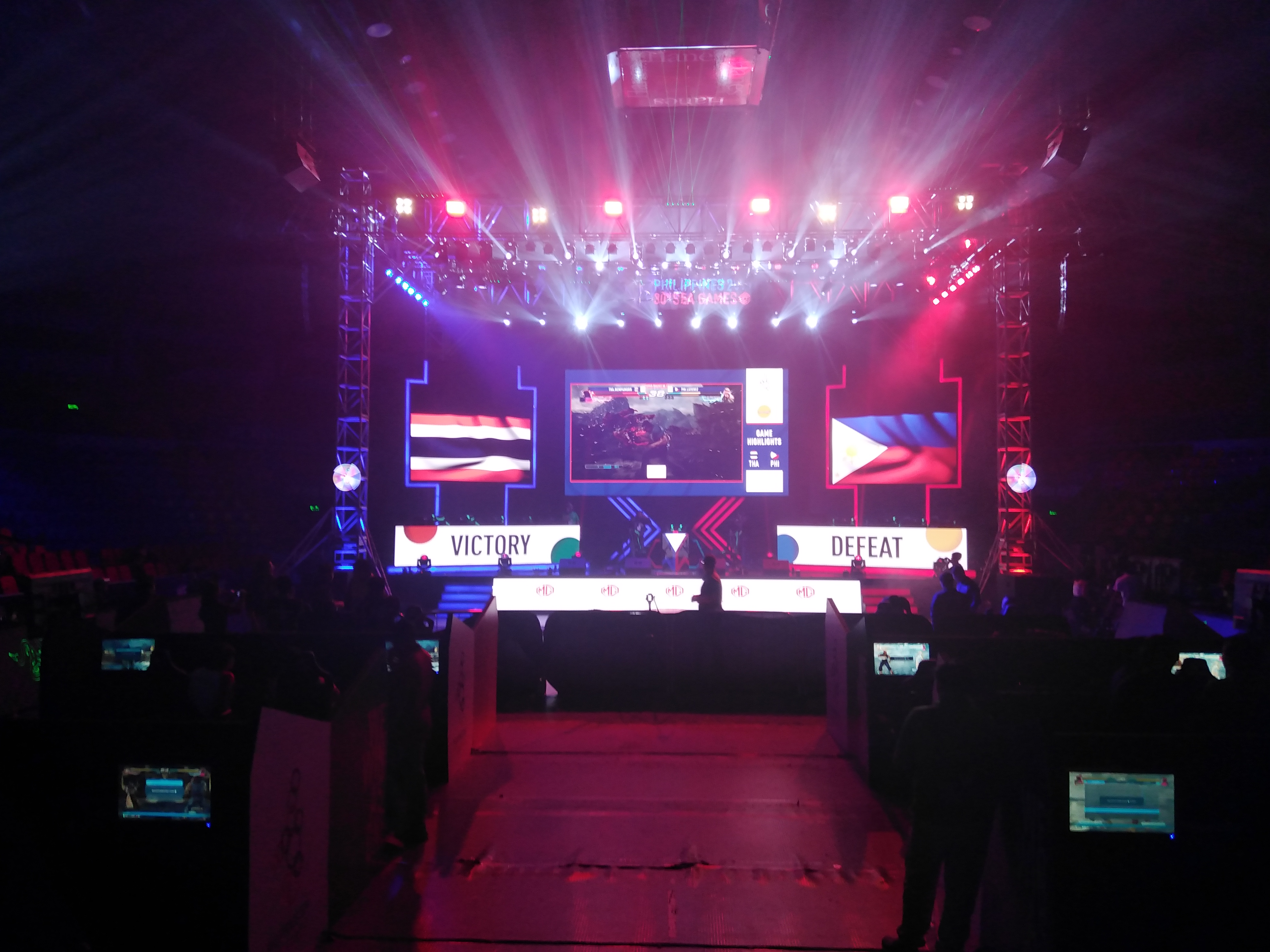
Esports match during the 2019 Southeast Asian Games.

Due to the popularity of video gaming in the Philippines, various outlets have conducted tournaments from local to international levels. In 2016 the Manila Cup held various gaming competitions with participation by local and international players, featuring games such as Mortal Kombat XL, BlazBlue Chronophantasma and Street Fighter. Big name conventions such as the Asia Pop Comic Convention and eSports and Gaming Summit hold various video game tournaments as part of their programs.

The surging popularity of esports in the Philippines has led to various Filipino teams competing in renowned eSports tournaments worldwide, even producing champions over different tournaments.

In 2017, a national eSports league was established which is called The Nationals.

Esports was introduced for the first time as a medal event in the 2019 Southeast Asian Games in which the Philippines hosted. Esports would be subsequently featured in succeeding editions of the regional games.

The Philippine Esports Organization (PeSO) is an esports entity that is the official Philippine representative to the International eSports Federation (IeSF), which is one of the largest esports associations in the world. It carries the interests of the Filipino esports community in the international arena.

== Companies ==
=== Game developers from Philippines ===
- Maccima Games LLC
- Polychroma Games
- Squeaky Wheel Studio
- TOSE Philippines, Inc (Filipino branch)
- Ubisoft Philippines
- Unicellular Games

==== Misc games ====
- Altitude Games (Mobile games)
- Anino Inc. (Ex-Anino Playlab, Anino Games, Inc. Slots games.)
- Digital Art Chefs (Art/illustration, comic books, storyboards, fashion design)
- Komikasi Games and Entertainment (Online & mobile games; art/illustration, web & mobile app development)
- Ranida Games (Primarily mobile games. Advergames & gamification.)
- Synergy88 Digital (Animation & interactive entertainment)

==== Co-development services ====
- CMD Studios (2D, animation. Also publisher.)
- FunGuy Studio (Mobile games. Also web/digital marketing.)
- Holysoft Studios Inc. (Game dev, art, animation, VFX. Also dev.)
- Secret 6, Inc. (Game & art)
- Whimsy Games (Filipino branch. Co-development, monetization, marketing.)

=== Defunct video game developers ===
- Zeenoh Inc. (Founded 2008. Inactive after 2018.)

=== Video game publishers of Philippines ===
- Level Up! Games

==== Publisher and developer firms ====
- Drix Studios (Ex-jujaswe in 2013-2016)
- GoldenGratus
- Monstronauts Inc.
- Spacezero Interactive
- Yangyang Mobile

==== Defunct video game publishers ====
- CatHuntTree (Publisher & dev)
- IP E-Games (Founded 2005. Merged with Level Up! Games in 2012.)
- Orc Chop Games (Manila studio. Publisher & dev. 2017-2024.)
- Coem (magic)

== Controversies and issues ==
=== 1981 ban on video games ===
On November 19, 1981, President Ferdinand Marcos banned video games in the country through a combination of Presidential Decree 519 and later Letter of Instruction No. 1176 s. 81 making the Philippines the first nation to ban video games. The decree was a response to complaints from parents and educators who alleged that games such as Space Invaders and Asteroids were detrimental to youth morals, viewing them as a "destructive social enemy" and existing "to the detriment of the public interest". Marcos also decreed the ban of pinball machines, slot machines, and other similar gaming devices. Filipinos were given two weeks to either destroy their video games and devices or surrender the materials to the police and army. Violators had to pay a fine amounting to about $600 and face 6 months to 1 year of prison. Playing video games in the country went underground. The ban was effectively lifted following the 1986 People Power Revolution.

=== Piracy ===
Unauthorized distribution of video games is a complex issue in the Philippines. Despite legislation against copyright violation, enforcement and cultural factors remain an obstacle in the country. Bootleg video games, along with warez, contribute to the underground economy of the country where video gaming is a popular form of entertainment among Filipino families. The inability of many Filipino families to afford video game software and hardware at legitimate prices leads them to turn to unlicensed goods. The Optical Media Board in cooperation with the police enforces intellectual rights law in the country. Due to the increased accessibility of the internet in the Philippines though smartphones, many Filipinos have found piracy resources more easily, with social media sites and apps such as TikTok, Viber, and Facebook being used to distribute links or files to others.

=== 2020s incidents ===
Incidents under the influence of video games increased media attention.

Due to being an "extremely rare" case of a school shooting within the country, one of the suspects previously played a violence-themed sandbox-type video game named GoreBox, according to the official investigation.
