= CIIT =

CIIT may refer to:

- CIIT College of Arts and Technology, an educational institution in Philippines
- CIIT-DT, a religious television station in Winnipeg, Manitoba
- Interoceanic Corridor of the Isthmus of Tehuantepec (abbreviated as CIIT), an under-construction trade route in Mexico
