= CIIT College of Arts and Technology =

Private college in Quezon City, Philippines

CIIT College of Innovation and Integrated Technology
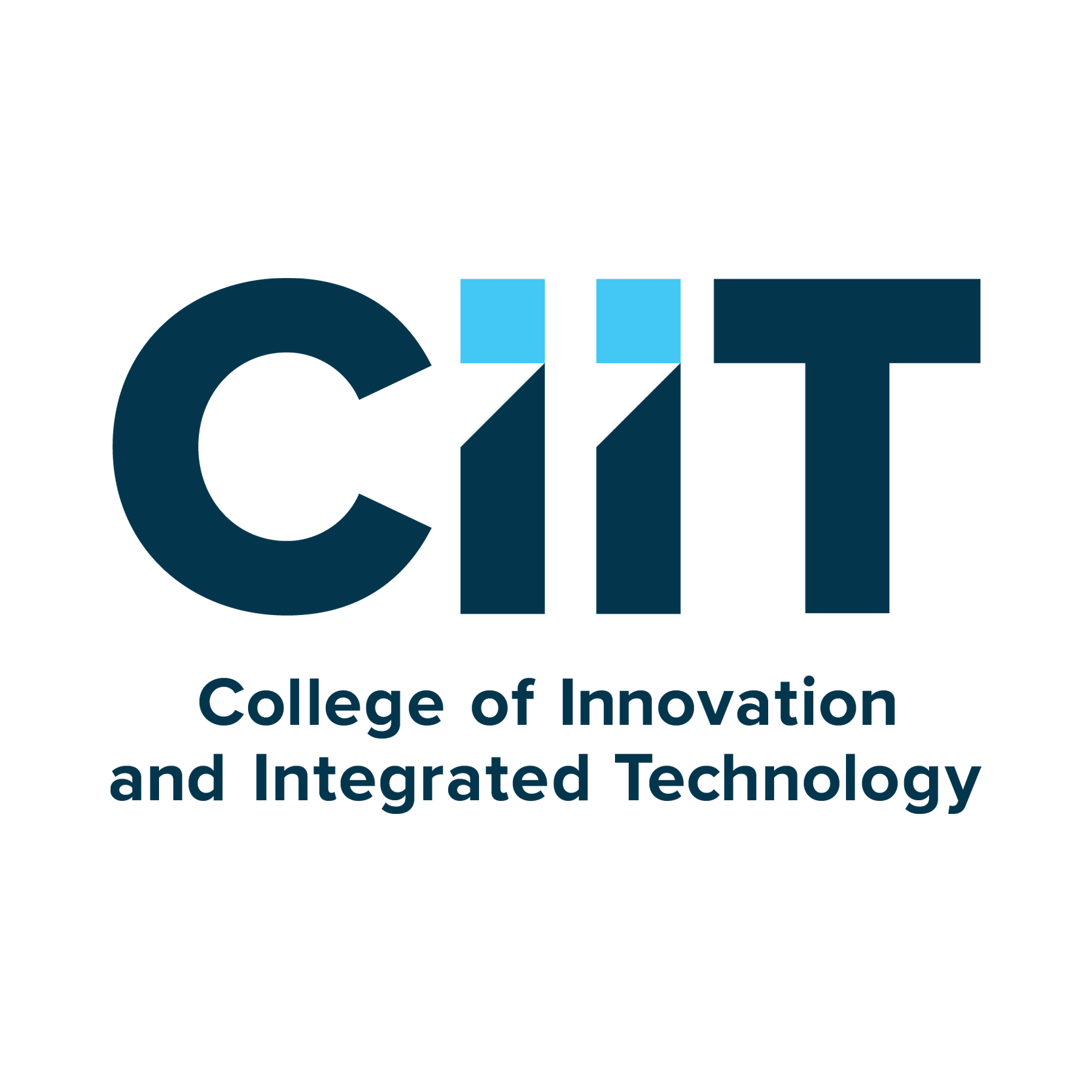
- Former names: Cosmopoint International Institute of Technology (2007–2013)
- Type: Private
- Established: 2007
- Chairman: Niel Dagondon
- President: Sherwin O
- Location: Quezon City, Metro Manila, Philippines; 14°37′46″N 121°02′31″E
- Website: www.ciit.edu.ph
- Location in Metro Manila Location in Luzon Location in the Philippines

CIIT College of Innovation and Integrated Technology (formerly Cosmopoint International Institute of Technology, College of Arts and Technology) is a private, non-sectarian institution in Quezon City, Philippines. The college provides programs in digital arts, information technology, and related fields, including web design, multimedia arts, computer graphics, 3D animation, mobile app development, game development, and software engineering.

The institution operates two campuses: the Senior High School Campus at Ignacia Place and the Interweave Campus on Kamuning Road, which houses college programs.

== History ==
CIIT College of Innovation and Integrated Technology was established in 2007 as Cosmopoint International Institute of Technology by Niel Dagondon. He established the school after that he found out that there is a shortage of skilled game developers after he established Anino Games in 2001.

In 2008, CIIT introduced itself as a technical-vocational school offering two-year diploma courses and specialist programs to students in digital arts and IT. Its first diploma programs include Computer Graphic Design, Multimedia Application, Software Engineering, Network Design, and E-business. Three years later, 3D Animation and Game Development were added to its list of course offerings.

CIIT is a previous member of the Cosmopoint Education Group from Kuala Lumpur, Malaysia and a partner of Kuala Lumpur Metropolitan University (KLMU). Through these connections, students were given the option to proceed with their diploma courses, continue their studies in KLMU, and earn an international bachelor's degree in Malaysia.

== Academic programs ==
In 2013, however, the college developed its own curriculum and acquired certification from the Commission on Higher Education to have its own bachelor's degree programs. These are Bachelor of Arts in Multimedia Arts with specializations in Digital Graphics Design, 3D Visualization, and Video and Motion Graphics, and Bachelor of Science in Computer Science with specializations in Software Engineering, Game Development, and Network Design.

Along with the two bachelor's degree programs, it also offers a diploma course based on the bachelor's degree courses.

Besides diploma and degree programs, the school also offers short courses in multimedia, web design, 3D animation, and game development. In addition, CIIT offers corporate training to companies needing customized instruction regarding the use of the latest software applications.

In January 2014, its BA Multimedia Arts Program was accredited by the Commission on Higher Education.

As part of the implementation of K-12 education system, CIIT Philippines also has a Senior High School program. Under the program, the students can specialize in multimedia arts, animation or programming. These specializations may then be transitioned into CIIT's corresponding college degree programs. In addition to being created to ensure a smooth transition, the SHS programs are also formed in such a way that the students will be able to pass the national certification exams for their chosen programs.

To cater to its growing population, CIIT moves to a new six-floor building (Interweave Campus) in Kamuning, Quezon City in January 2018. The Interweave Campus houses the college, senior high school, and specialist students and school employees.

== Student life and culture ==
=== Industry-based education ===
The college adopted an industry-based curriculum to expose and prepare students for real-life career activities. Its curriculum, which was co-designed by CIIT, Anino Games, and other industry partners, provides a specialized teaching method that conforms to the technical needs of contemporary companies for digital arts and information technology in the Philippines.

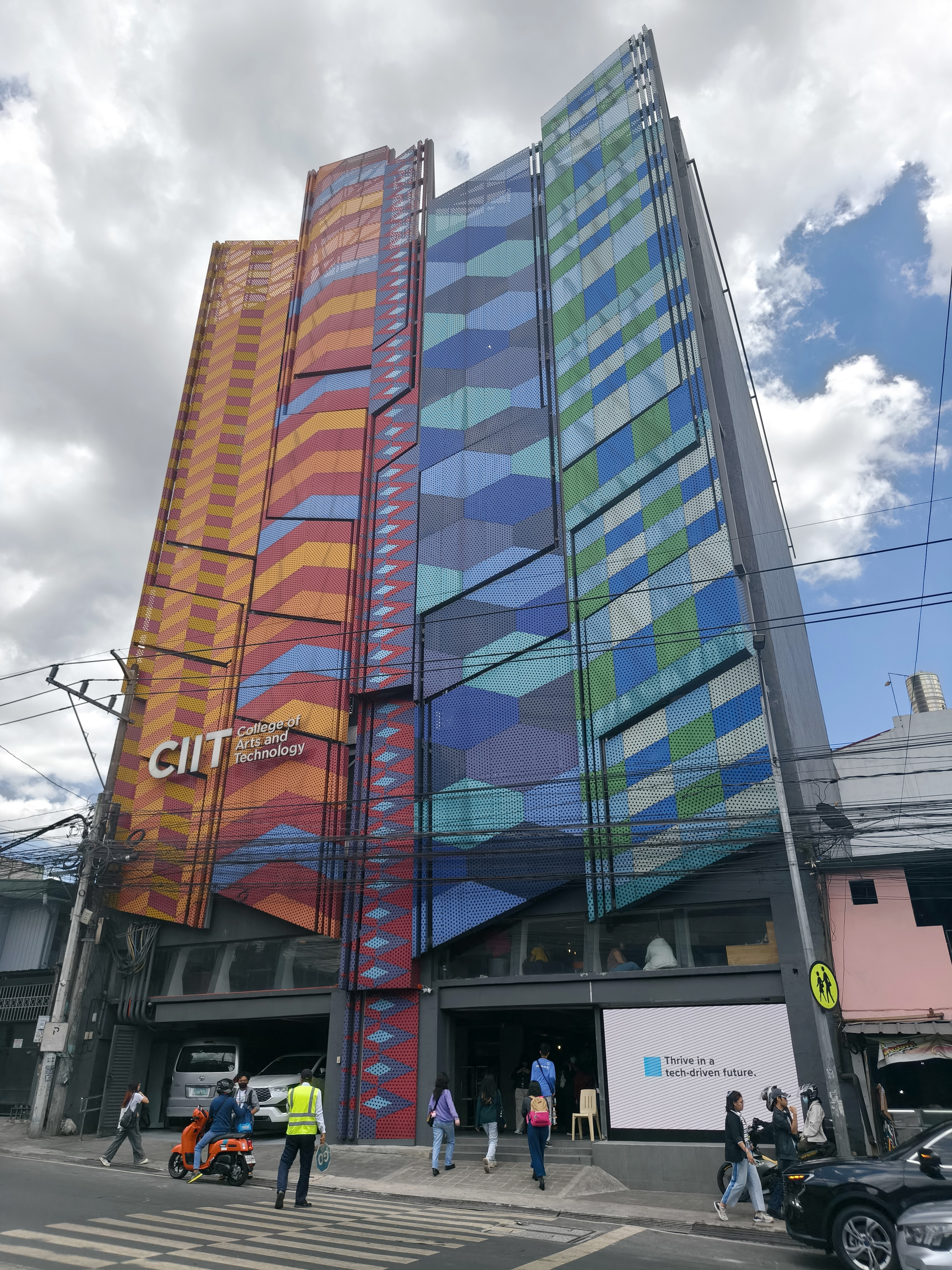
Facade

=== Events and traditions ===
- Inabel Awards - held twice a year to celebrate students and industry partners.
- Acquaintance Celebration - which held every first trimester of the academic year.
- Phantasya - annual art contest developed by CIIT, which aims to encourage and recognize students with individual passions for arts and design. The art competition is open to all graduating Filipino high school students and is composed of three categories (traditional arts, digital arts, game development) with two or three winners per category.
- Video Music Awards - encouraging students to showcase their talents through video production.
- First stop - An orientation/acquaintance party for new college students.
- Sportsfest - Annual week-long sporting events.

=== Population ===
From 21 students in 2008, the school's student population increased by 500% in its second year of operation. In 2014, there were more than 500 students in all of its courses. As of February 2017, there were 577 students. There were 1,628 students in college and 273 students in Senior High School as of August 2022.

== Partners ==
- Game Developers Association of the Philippines – CIIT has been an academic member of GDAP since 2008, along with De La Salle University-Manila, Mapua Institute of Technology, and San Sebastian College- Recoletos de Manila.
- Anino Games is a leading game developer in the Philippines and a partner of CIIT since 2008.
- IBM Philippines – CIIT signed a partnership with IBM Philippines on October 19, 2011.
