= Binangonan Church =

Roman Catholic Church in Rizal, Philippines

- Santa Ursula Parish Church
- Simbahan ng Parokya ni Santa Ursula (Filipino)
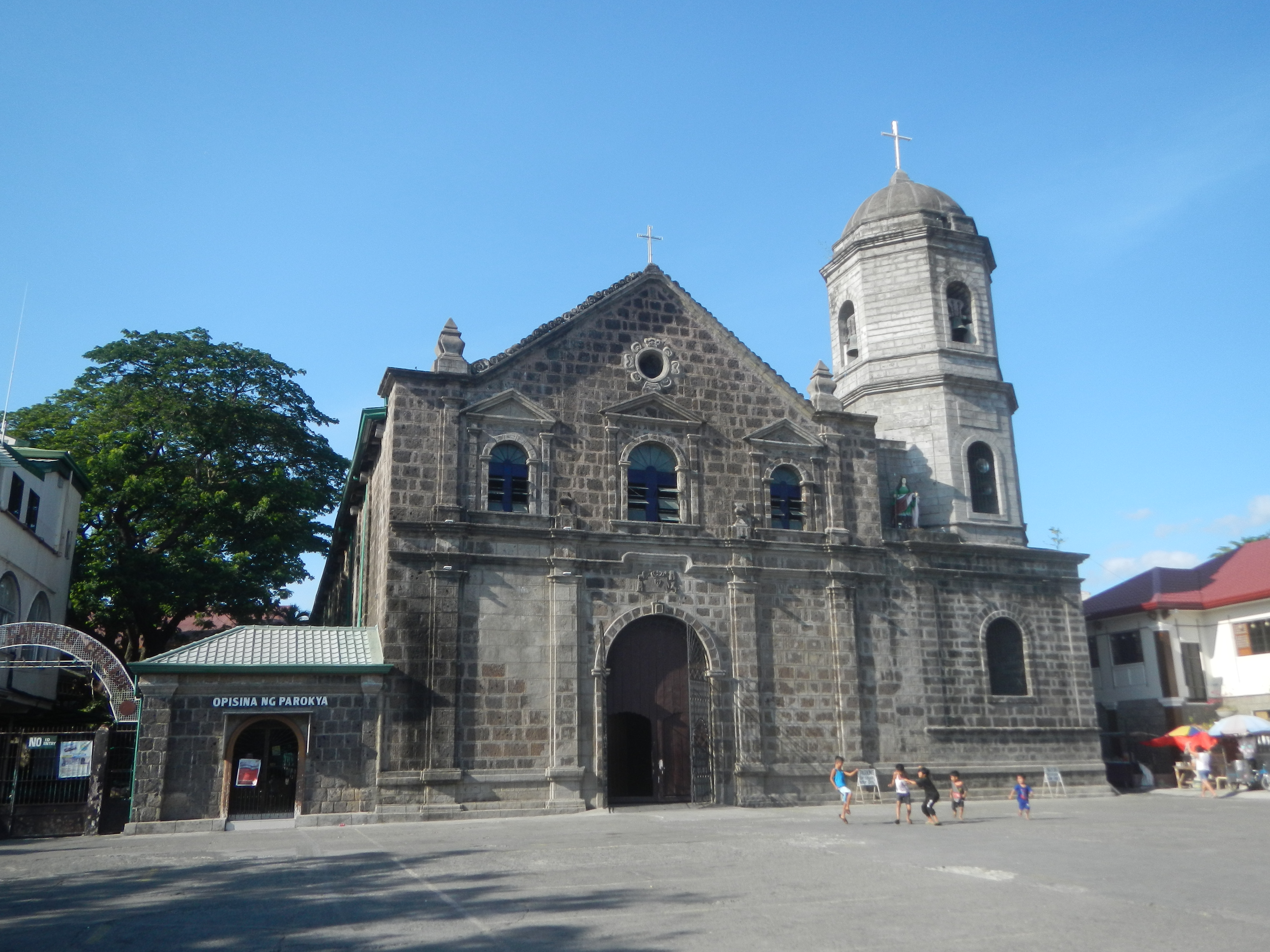
- Church facade in 2019

- Location in Luzon Location in the Philippines
- 14°27′53″N 121°11′35″E
- Location: Libid, Binangonan, Rizal
- Country: Philippines
- Denomination: Roman Catholic

Architecture
- Functional status: Active
- Heritage designation: National Cultural Treasure
- Designated: March 2, 2025
- Architectural type: Church building

Administration
- Archdiocese: Manila
- Diocese: Antipolo

National Cultural Treasures
- Designated: March 2, 2025
- Region: Calabarzon

Santa Ursula Parish Church, also known as Binangonan Church, is a 225-year-old church located in Barangay Libid, Binangonan, Rizal, in the Philippines. It is under the jurisdiction of the Diocese of Antipolo and is among the diocese's seven Jubilee churches.

== History ==
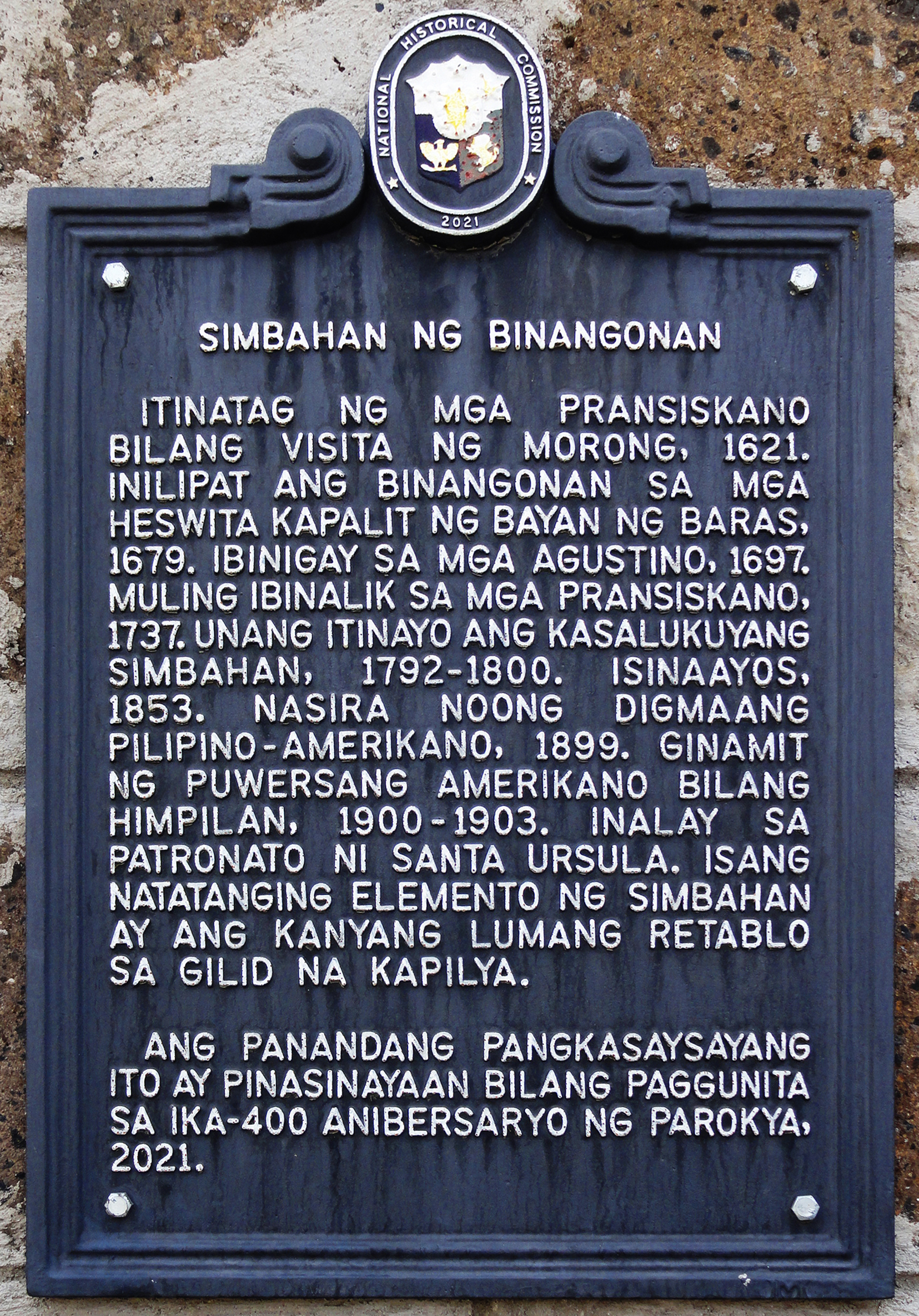
Church NHC historical marker installed in 2021

By the year 1571–1602, the municipality of Binangonan was founded by Spanish missionaries. It was only a part of Morong at that time, but on 1621, it was separated. The Spanish missionaries then decided to create an independent parish and chose St. Ursula as the parish's patron.

The parish of Binangonan was founded in 1621. In 1679, its administration was handed over to the Jesuits, who in 1697 transferred administration to the Augustinians. In 1737, Binangonan returned to the administration of the Franciscans, who had founded it in the first place. The church was built from 1792 to 1800, renovated in 1853. At the same time, the adjacent convento was rebuilt, under Fr. Francisco de Paula Gomez.

In 2025, the church was officially declared a national cultural treasure by the National Commission for Culture and the Arts.

== Gallery ==
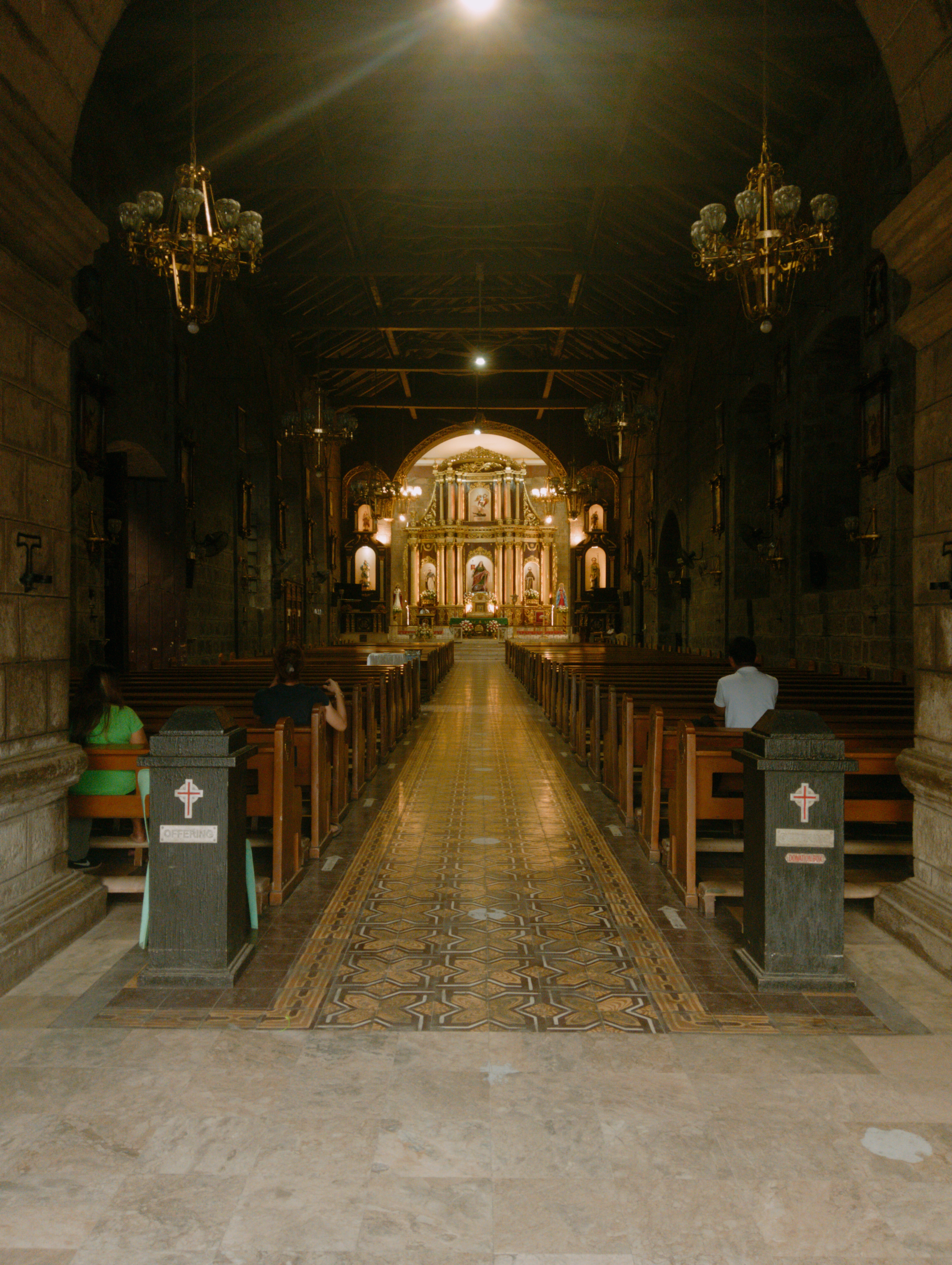
Nave in 2026

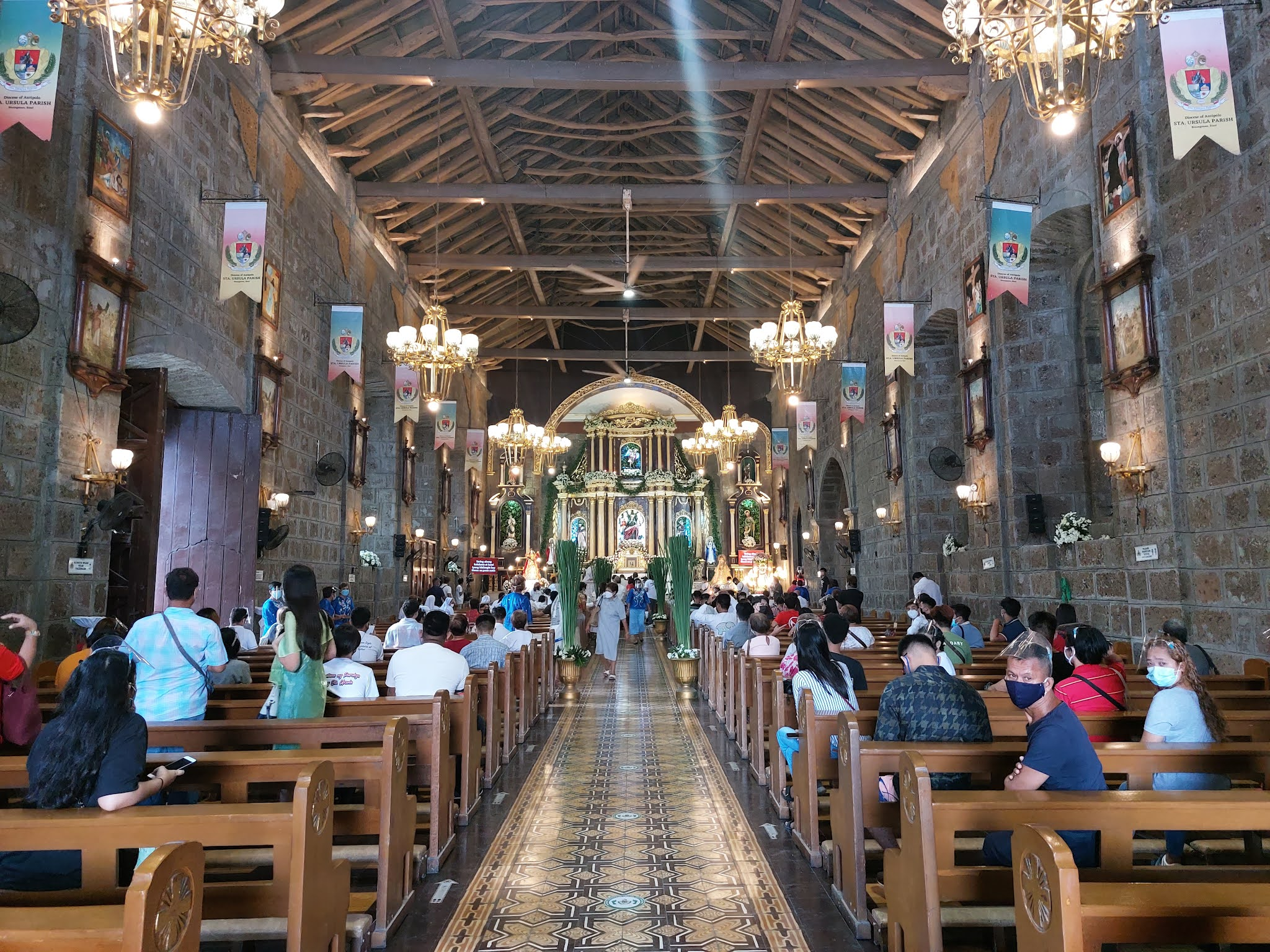
Church interior in 2021

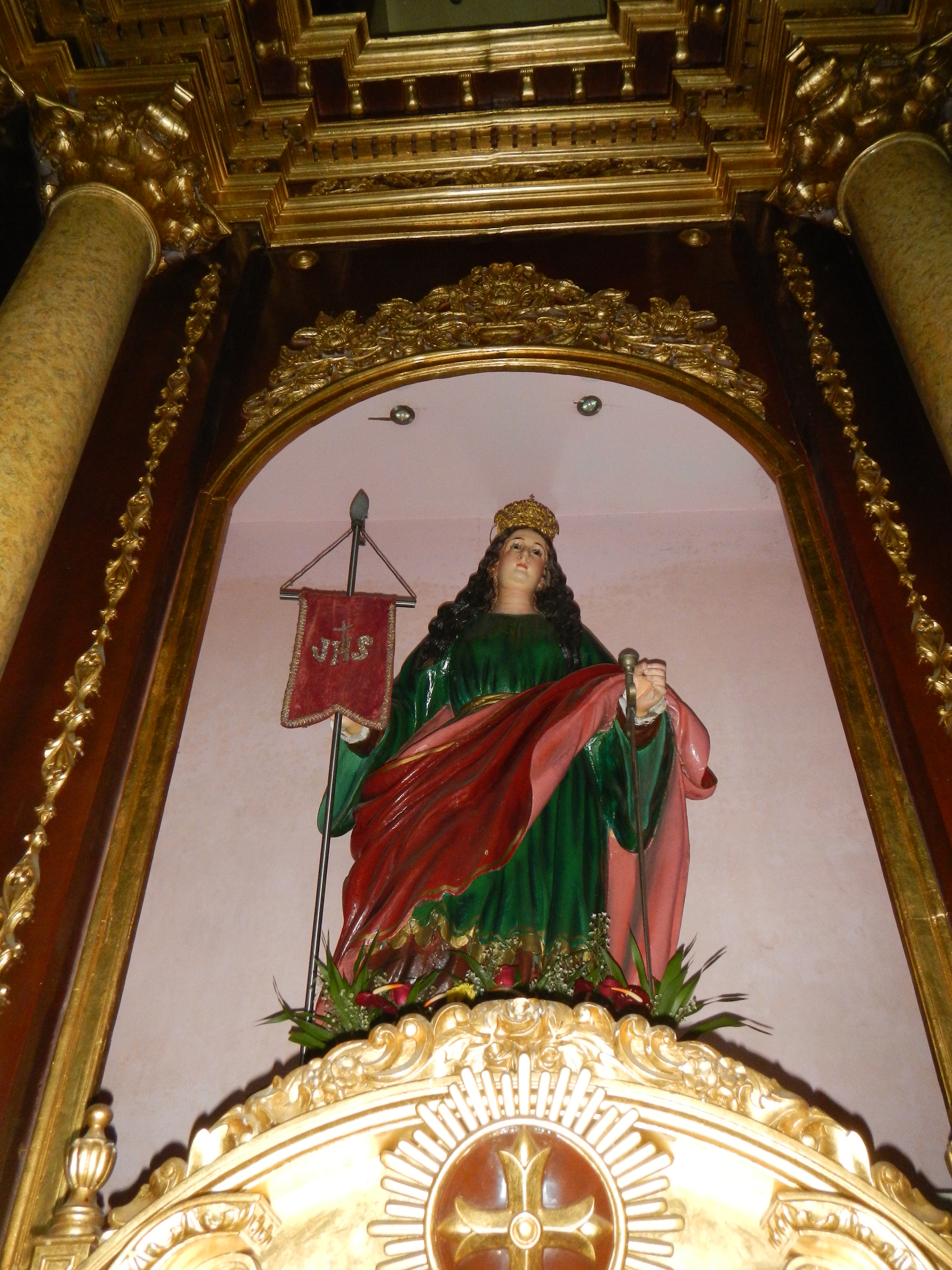
Patron St. Ursula in the sanctuary

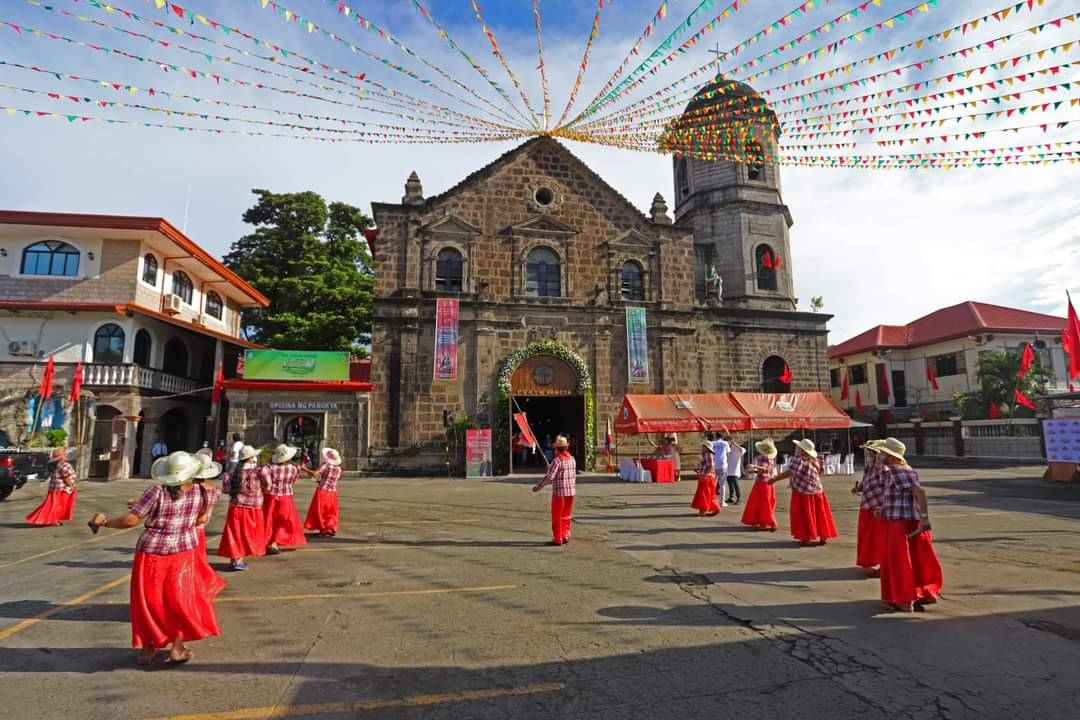
Main facade with a group of fiesta dancers in front

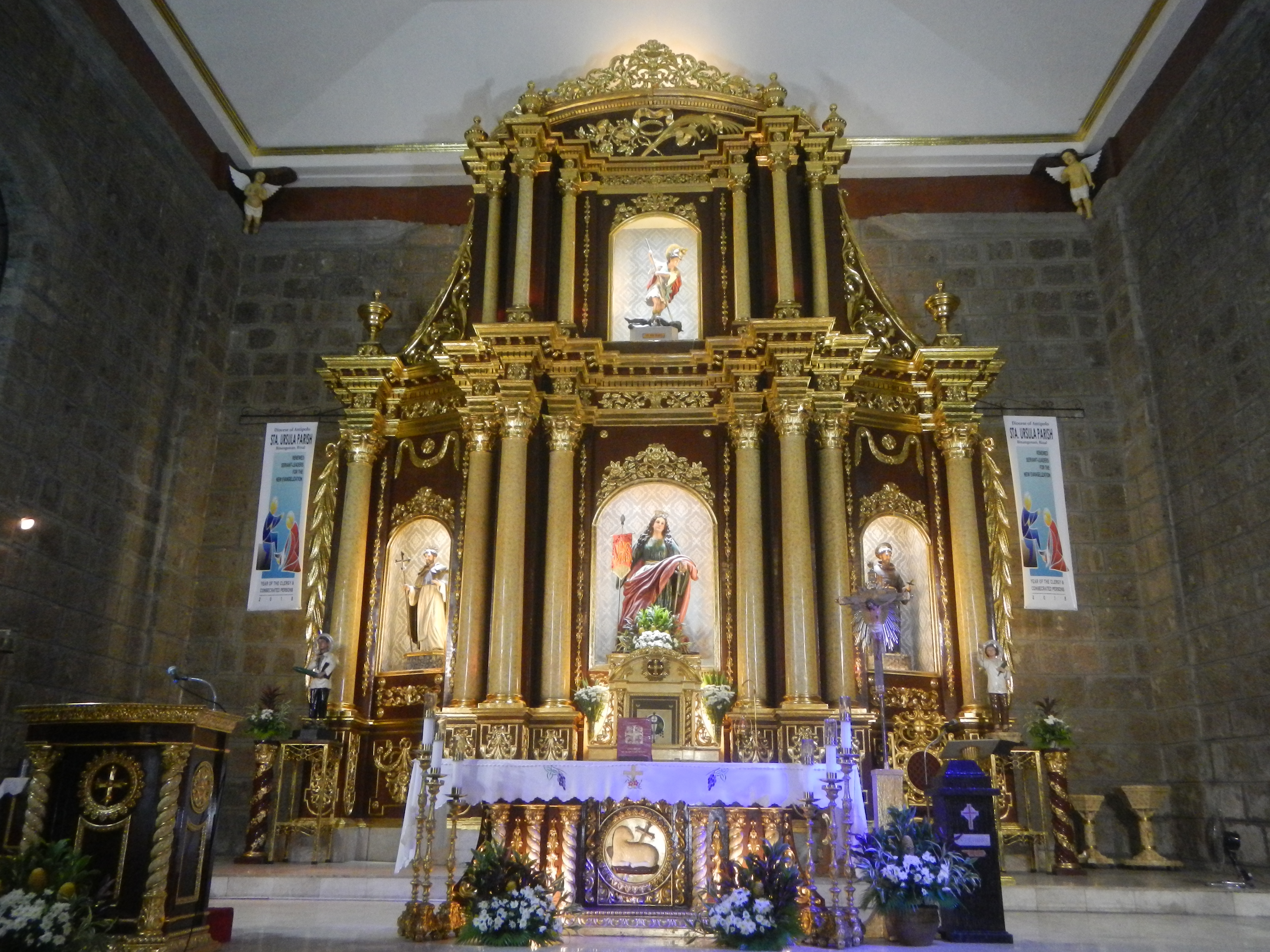
Church altar and reredos

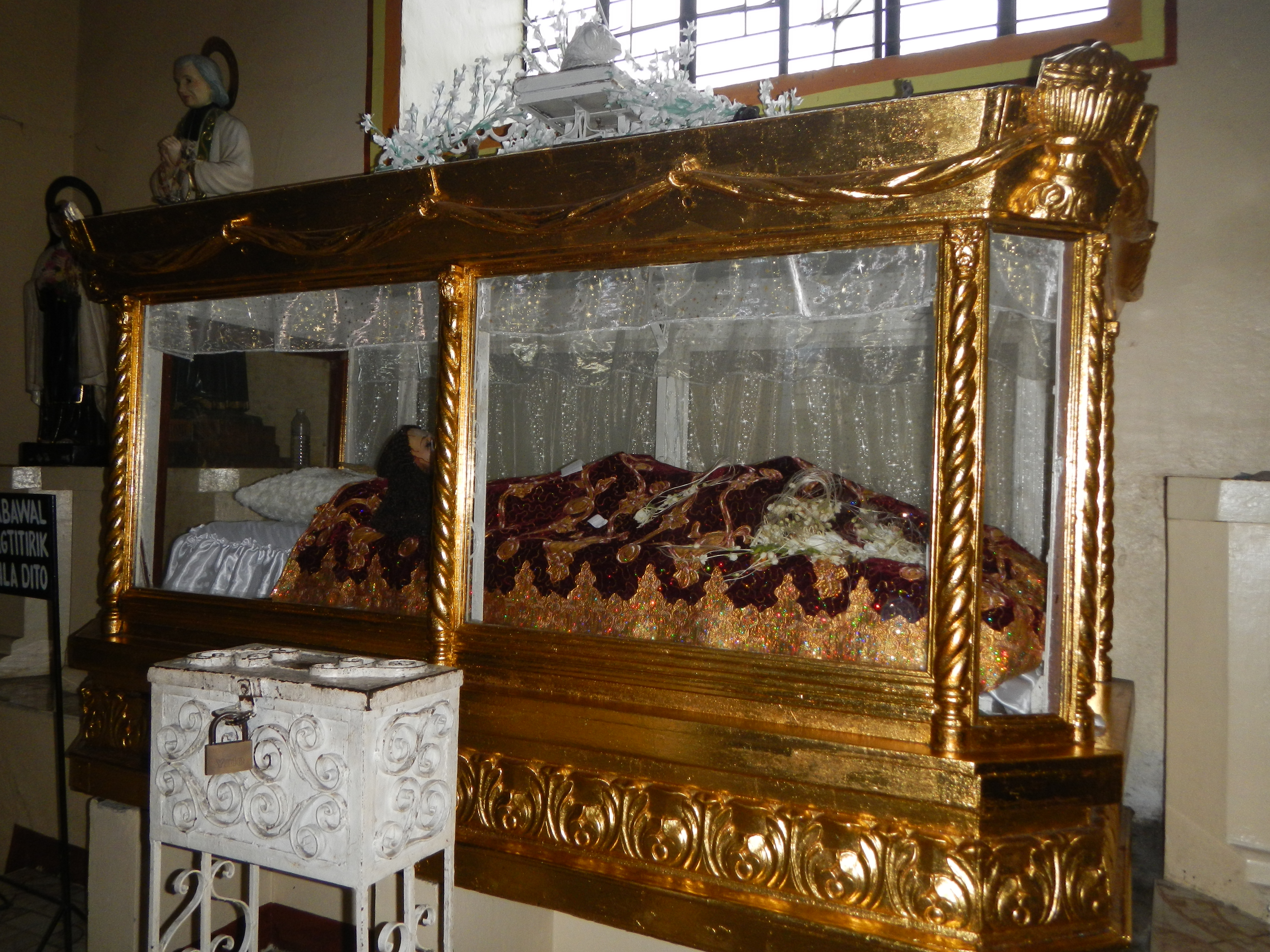
Santo Entierro
