= Multimedia studies =

Multimedia studies is an interdisciplinary field of academic discourse focused on the understanding of technologies and cultural dimensions of linking traditional media sources with ones based on new media to support social systems.

== History ==
Multimedia studies as a discipline came out of the need for media studies to be made relevant to the new world of CD-ROMs and hypertext in the 1990s. Revolutionary books like Jakob Nielsen's Hypertext and Hypermedia lay the foundations for understanding multimedia alongside traditional cognitive science and interface design issues. Software like Authorware Attain, now owned by Adobe, made the design of multimedia systems accessible to those unskilled in programming and became major applications by the end of the 1990s.

=== Recent challenges ===
The Internet age that has been growing since the launch of Windows 98 has brought new challenges for the discipline including developing new models and rules for the World Wide Web. Areas such as usability have had to develop specific guidelines for website design and traditional concepts like genre, narrative theory, and stereotypes have had to be updated to take account of cyberculture. Cultural aspects of multimedia studies have been conceptualised by authors such as Lev Manovich, Arturo Escobar and Fred Forest.

The increase in Internet trolling and so-called Internet addiction has thrown up new problems. Concepts like emotional design and affective computing are driving multimedia studies research to consider ways of becoming more seductive and able to take account of the needs of users.

==== Media studies 2.0 ====
Some academics, such as David Gauntlett, have preferred the neologism, "Media Studies 2.0" to multimedia studies, in order to give it the feel of other fields like Web 2.0 and Classroom 2.0. The media studies 2.0 neologism has received strong criticism. Andy Medhurst at Sussex University for instance wrote of the media studies 2.0 neologism introduced by David Gauntlett, "Isn't it odd that whenever someone purportedly identifies a new paradigm, they see themselves as already a leading practitioner of it?"

== Issues and concepts ==
1. Media ecology and information ecology
2. Cybercultures and new media
3. Online communities and virtual communities
4. Internet trolling and Internet addiction
5. Captology

== Universities offering degrees in multimedia studies ==
- University of the Philippines Open University (BArts multimedia studies)
- CIIT College of Arts and Technology (BArts multimedia arts)
- iAcademy (BArts multimedia arts and design)
- De La Salle–College of Saint Benilde (BArts multimedia arts)
- Arizona State University (BS multimedia writing & technical communication)
- Aston University (BSc multimedia computing)
- Birmingham City University (BSc multimedia technology)
- University of East London (BSc multimedia studies)
- Glyndwr University (BA graphic design and multimedia)
- University of Mary Hardin-Baylor (BS multimedia & information technology)
- Middlesex University (BSc multimedia computing)
- Robert Gordon University (BSc multimedia development)
- University of Westminster (multimedia computing)
