= Rizal National Science High School =

Public high school in Rizal, Philippines

- Mataas na Paaralang Nasyonal na Pang-Agham ng Rizal (Filipino)

Location
- Jose P. Rizal Ave., Dalig, Batingan, Binangonan, Rizal; Philippines
- 14°28′20.55″N 121°11′49.76″E

Information
- Type: Public Science
- Motto: 'Home of scholars, where excellence is a way of life'
- Established: 1998
- School number: 301455
- Principal: Dr. Shiela B. Peñano
- Grades: 7 to 12
- Enrollment: 933 (as of S.Y. 2024-2025)
- Colours: Green, White, Maroon
- Nickname: Rizal Science, RiSci, RNSHS
- Team name: Spartans
- Newspaper: The Isotopes; Ang Aghamanon
- Affiliation: Republic of the Philippines; Department of Education; Region IV-A (CALABARZON); Division of Rizal
- Website: www.rizalnationalsciencehighschool.com

The Rizal National Science High School (Filipino: Mataas na Paaralang Nasyonal na Pang-Agham ng Rizal), commonly known as RNSHS, RiSci, or Rizal Science is a public science high school on Jose P. Rizal Ave., Brgy. Batingan, Binangonan, Rizal, Philippines. It was founded in 1998.

== History ==
The Rizal National Science High School first opened for the school year 1998–99. It was established to provide for more intensive and advanced secondary education program with special reference to science and technology.

The establishment of the Rizal National Science High School was conceived and proposed by then Cong. Gilberto M. Duavit of the First District of Rizal who envisioned Rizal to be "the knowledge center in Asia" in coordination with Department of Education, Culture, and Sports (DECS) Division of Rizal under the leadership of the superintendent, Dr. Edith A. Doblada. Congressman Duavit then introduced House Bill No. 3910, for "the purpose of establishing a National Science School in Taytay, Rizal to be known as Rizal National Science High School and appropriating funds therefore." Later, Board Members Virgilio Esguerra and Felipe Vital filed Resolution No. 97 – 140 requesting Congressman Duavit to transfer the site from Antipolo to Binangonan.

On January 19, 1998, Republic Act No. 8724, "AN ACT ESTABLISHING A NATIONAL SCIENCE HIGH SCHOOL IN THE MUNICIPALITY OF BINANGONAN, PROVINCE OF RIZAL, TO BE KNOWN AS THE RIZAL NATIONAL SCIENCE HIGH SCHOOL, AND APPROPRIATING FUNDS THEREFORE" was approved.

The establishment of RNSHS was in response to DECS Order No. 69, s 1993 where the Department of Education, Culture and Sports encourages the establishment of science high schools, initially among the public high schools in coordination with the Department of Science and Technology starting school year 1994−95.

On its initial operation (school year 1998−99), 90 scholars (34 boys and 56 girls), six mentors, and two non-teaching personnel from the local government were housed at the Rizal State College Binangonan Campus under the supervision of Remedios C. Gervacio, head teacher III, and Dr. Remedios G. Aquino, science supervisor, as monitoring official.

Three classrooms, one computer laboratory room, one science laboratory room, one library room, one guidance center, one canteen, 10-seat comfort rooms and principal's office were on the ground floor of the RSC building. Science equipment, instructional materials like books, charts, audio-visual resources, tables, chairs etc. were given by the DECS Division and Regional offices and the provincial government.

Students joined municipal, provincial, regional and national academic competitions and have brought several major awards. Likewise, in the division achievement test, the school ranked first in almost all subjects.

On June 4, 1999, before the start of school year 1999−2000, RNSHS moved to its permanent site at Brgy. Batingan occupying the Ynares type building with six classrooms completed, just enough for six sections.

In December of school year 2001−02 (After the terror attacks on September 11), Genesius Fulgeras took over as the principal. After eight months, Marissa SJ. Gatapia, Education Supervisor I in Secondary Science, was designated as the Officer-in-Charge. From May 2, 2002, to May 15, 2003, Cristina C. Camarse, principal took over from Fulgeras. From May 16, 2003, until the early 2010s, Elena V. Bernardo was the principal. She was followed by Elvira R. Conese, and Edna H. Villamayor. From August 1, 2022, the school head has been Dr. Edith SA. delos Santos.

On April 13, 2024, RNSHS's longest-serving Officer-in-Charge and SHS Registrar (with 23 years of active service), Mrs. Alma Abuacan-Casas, has retired.

== Admission ==
In conformance to the Division Memoranda issued by the Division of Rizal annually, these are the students who are eligible to take the RiSci entrance examination:

- The applicant must belong to the upper 10% of the graduating class in public or private elementary school in:
  - Division of Rizal; and
  - Any division provided he/she have maintained residency in the Province of Rizal for at least one year before his/her application.

Students who seek admission to the school must pass two written examinations. Later, the students must undergo interviews with the school's board of members and faculty.

The examination consists of mental ability test and achievement test covering verbal and non-verbal analogy, biology, physics, and mathematics. The first entrance examination is held in January, the second in February, and the interview in March–April.

The top 120 students are admitted and announced weeks after the interview process.

== Academic regulations ==
=== Academic performance requirements ===
A student should maintain grades of 85% or higher in all the subjects, in every grading period. A grade of 84% or below in any subject, in any grading period of the school year will lead the student to a probationary status. A final grade of 84% (flat) or below in any subject indicates failure.

=== Grading system ===
The grades of the students are based on the guidelines and criteria prescribed by the Department of Education.

There are four grading periods. The grades in each period are computed based on 'Percentage Distribution of the Components of Students' Grade' (Enclosure no. 2 to DepEd Order no. 33, s. 2004). The final grade for each subject area will be computed by averaging.

== Student life ==
The learning environment of RiScians is not limited to its walls. Students are exposed to extracurricular activities such as science fairs, school press conferences, quiz bees, seminars, training, student organizations and clubs.

=== Extracurricular activities ===
RNSHS actively participates annually in contests like Schools Press Conferences, Science Fairs, Essay Writing Contest, Patimpalak ng Sabayang Pagbigkas, Speech Choir Competitions, Oratorical and Extemporaneous Speaking, Water Rocket Events, Tagisang Robotics of the Department of Science and Technology, and other events sponsored by schools, government agencies/units and non-government organizations.

=== Culture ===
==== Sablay/Sakbay ====
Inspired from the University of the Philippines' Sablay, RNSHS has its version of garb worn during commencement exercises. It is worn before the gala (long sleeves) uniform. The colors of the garb were based on the school's colors—red and green. Running through the sablay are Baybayin figures of the batch number (in Filipino language) of which a member is a graduate.

==== Mr. and Ms. RiSci ====
Launched by the RNSHS Parents and Teachers' Association (PTA) annually, Mr. and Ms. RiSci is one of the school's most-awaited event. Its objectives are to showcase the students' beauty, intelligence and talent to the RiSci community and to raise funds for school projects. The pageant is divided into two parts: pre-pageant and coronation.

==== Family Day ====
Emphasizing the words Kakaiba ang Pamilyang Iskolar, RNSHS holds its annual Family Day event to strengthen the relationships of the families of students and faculty. It is held in December.

==== Risci Got Talent ====
Inspired by popular talent shows, each year, RNSHS holds a talent show where students of all grade levels can participate. It is held after classes and is something many students look forward to each year.
