= Layunan, Binangonan =

Mainland barangay in the Philippines

Layunan
- Mainland Barangay
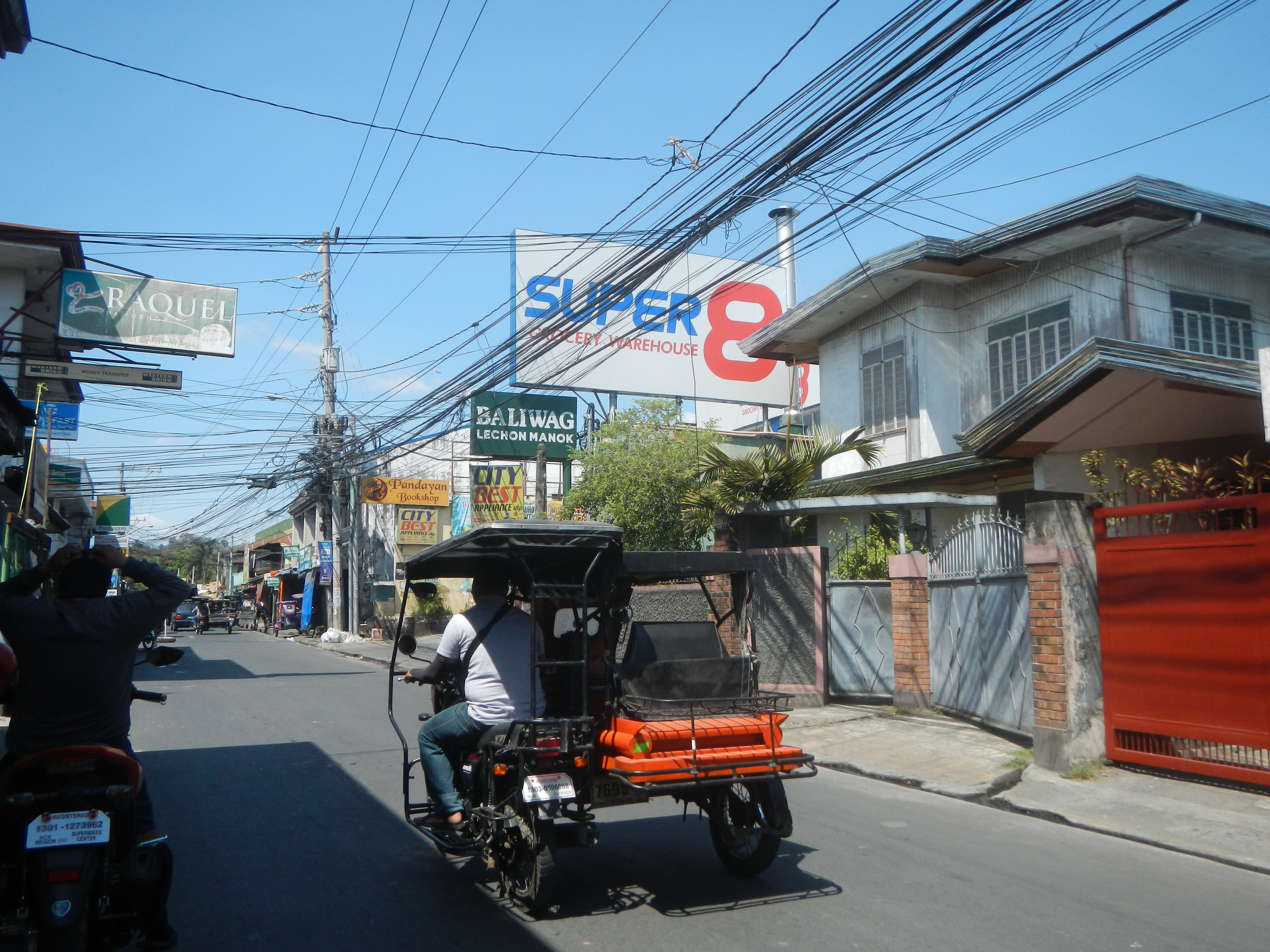
- Layunan in 2019.
- Interactive map of Layunan
- Location of Layunan in the Philippines
- Coordinates: 14°28′06.4″N 121°11′36.5″E
- Country: Philippines
- Region: Region IV-A, Calabarzon
- Province: Rizal
- District: 1st District
- Municipality: Binangonan, Rizal
- Barangay: Layunan

Government
  - Barangay captain: Arnel V. Chulvo

Area
  - Land: 0.12 km^{2} (0.046 sq mi)
- Elevation: 9.4 m (31 ft)

Population (2020)
  - Total: 2,575
  - Density: 1,013.78/km^{2} (2,625.7/sq mi)
- Time zone: UTC+8 (PST)
- ZIP code: 1940

Layunan, officially Barangay Layunan is one of the mainland barangays of Binangonan, in the province of Rizal. Its population as determined by the 2020 Census was 2,575. This represented 0.82% of the total population of Binangonan.

== History ==
Layunan is part of the Poblacion barangays together with Barangay Libid and Libis.

== Education ==
Layunan currently does not hold any public high school, though it only has one public elementary school. Namely, the Binangonan Elementary School. Layunan also has a private school, the Bon Jasper Angels Academy School.

== Festivals ==
Layunan shares a festival with Barangays Calumpang, Libis and Libid. The barangay celebrates the annual town festival of Binangonan, Santa Ursula being its patron. The annual festival is usually celebrated with the Binalayan Festival wherein people would dance in the street representing the town's culture. People would also splash water to incoming vehicles.

== Geography ==
Layunan is located inside the town proper, and it is 1.61 kilometers away from the municipal hall. It borders Barangay Calumpang as its north and west, Batingan as its northeast, Mahabang Parang as its east, Libid as its southeast, and Libis as its southwest. Average elevation in this area is estimated to be 9.4 meters (30.8 ft) above sea level.

== Demographics ==
Population Census of Layunan
Year	Pop.	±% p.a.
1990	3,337	—
1995	3,363	+0.15%
2000	3,465	+0.64%
2007	3,353	−0.45%
2010	3,370	+0.18%
2015	2,491	−5.59%
2020	2,575	+0.70%

According to the 2015 census, the barangay of Layunan had a population of 2,491 subdivided into 488 households or 5.10 people per household. The age group with the highest population are from ages 5 to 9, representing 10% of the total population. The age group with the lowest population are from ages 80 and above, representing only 0.80% of the total population.

According to the 2020 census, the population of Layunan fell from 3,337 in 1990 to 2,575 in 2020, a decrease of 762 people over the course of 30 years. The figures in 2020 denote a growth rate of 0.70%, or an increase of 84 people, from the previous population of 2,491 in 2015.

== See also ==
- Binangonan
