= Anito: Defend a Land Enraged =

2003 video game

- Game title art
- Developer: Anino Entertainment
- Publisher: Anino Entertainment
- Platform: Windows
- Release: EU/NA: November 20, 2003; PHI: November 22, 2003
- Genres: Adventure, role-playing
- Mode: Single player

Anito: Defend a Land Enraged is a role-playing video game based on Filipino mythology and folklore developed by Anino Entertainment, an independent video game company based in Manila, Philippines. It was released on November 22, 2003, for Microsoft Windows.

Anito: Defend a Land Enraged is the first video game that was produced and designed entirely by a team of Filipino game developers. The game also became a turning point that spawned the birth of game development industry in the Philippines.

== Gameplay ==
The gameplay in Anito: Defend a Land Enraged is centered around combat and exploration. Players navigate the game's open-world environment using a combination of keyboard and mouse controls. They can engage in combat with various enemy types using a variety of weapons and abilities, including swords, shields, and ranged weapons. Players can also interact with non-playable characters (NPCs) and complete quests to progress through the story and unlock new abilities and equipment.

In addition to combat and exploration, Anito: Defend a Land Enraged features a variety of other gameplay elements, including puzzle-solving and resource management. Players must gather resources and craft items to survive and progress through the game, and they can also upgrade their character's abilities and equipment as they progress.

== Plot ==
Anito is set in the 16th century on the island Maroka in Asia. Maroka is besieged both by internal conflict and armored invaders from a faraway place who are slowly turning the land into their monarch's colony. Datu Maktan – leader of the Mangatiwala tribe and the land's most influential peacemaker – mysteriously disappears, and it is up to his children Agila and Maya to find him and restore delicate peace that their father has kept in balance before conflicting forces tear the land apart.

== Development ==
Anito is the first Filipino-made PC game. Its production started in October 2001. After two years of development, Philippine indie game developer Anino Entertainment launched its pioneering project, Anito: Defend A Land Enraged. The game was released in the US on November 20, 2003, and in Europe on November 20, 2003. It was made available in stores and for online purchase in the Philippines on November 22, 2003.

=== Development team ===
Developer	Position
Niel Dagondon	Producer and Programmer
Michael Rivero	Creative Art Director
Gabby Dizon	Designer

== Reception and awards ==
Anito: Defend a Land Enraged has received average to negative reviews, with a score of 63 on Metacritic and 55.80% on GameRankings.

Anito won in the Innovation in Audio category at The 12th Annual Independent Games Festival in 2004.
