= Batingan, Binangonan =

Mainland barangay in the Philippines

Batingan
- Mainland Barangay
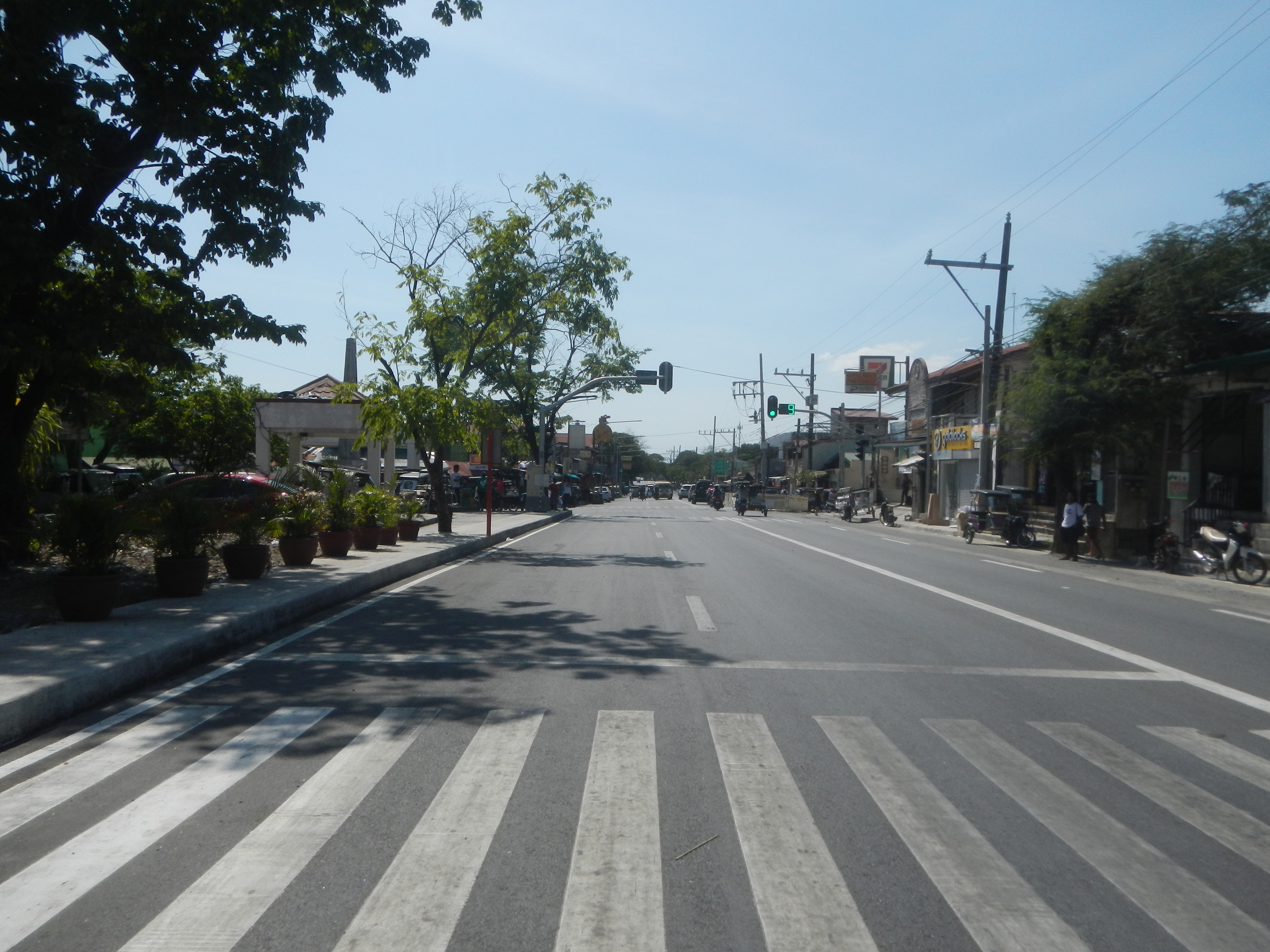
- Batingan in 2019.

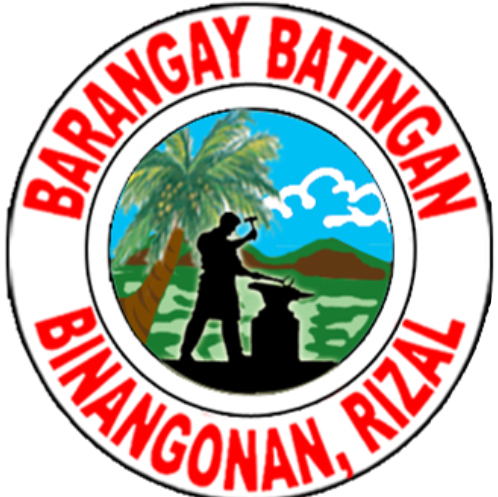
- Seal
- Interactive map of Batingan
- Location of Batingan in the Philippines
- Coordinates: 14°28′19.4″N 121°11′48.1″E
- Country: Philippines
- Region: Region IV-A, Calabarzon
- Province: Rizal
- District: 1st District
- Municipality: Binangonan, Rizal
- Barangay: Batingan

Government
  - Barangay captain: Guillermo T. Anore

Area
  - Land: 1.09 km^{2} (0.42 sq mi)
- Elevation: 24.6 m (81 ft)

Population (2020)
  - Total: 16,280
  - Density: 14,800/km^{2} (38,000/sq mi)
- Time zone: UTC+8 (PST)
- ZIP code: 1940

Batingan, officially Barangay Batingan is one of the mainland barangays of Binangonan, in the province of Rizal. Its population as determined by the 2020 Census was 16,280. This represented 5.19% of the total population of Binangonan.

== History ==
Batingan is known to be a rapidly developing barangay, it has contributed a large portion in the local economy of Binangonan.

== Education ==
Batingan currently does not have any public elementary school, though it only has one public high school. Namely, Rizal National Science High School (RiSci). Batingan also has several private schools such as D, Spring of Wisdom Learning Center, Binangonan Garden of Learners, Child Jesus of Prague School (Batingan Campus), and Shining Light Christian College Inc.

== Festivals ==
Batingan's local patron is Saint Roque, it celebrates its patron every August 16. Batingan also celebrates the annual town festival of Binangonan, Santa Ursula being its patron. The annual festival is usually celebrated with the Binalayan Festival wherein people would dance in the street representing the town's culture. People would also splash water to incoming vehicles.

== Geography ==
Batingan is located a kilometer away from the town proper, and 1.42 kilometers away from the municipal hall. It borders Barangay Tatala as its north, Mambog as its northeast, Mahabang Parang as its south, Layunan as its southwest, Calumpang as its west, and Macamot as its northwest. Average elevation in this area is estimated to be 24.6 meters (80.7 ft) above sea level.

== Demographics ==
Population Census of Batingan
Year	Pop.	±% p.a.
1990	6,473	—
1995	7,294	+2.26%
2000	10,390	+7.88%
2007	12,016	+2.03%
2010	12,999	+2.90%
2015	13,931	+1.33%
2020	16,280	+3.33%

According to the 2015 census, the barangay of Batingan had a population of 13,931 subdivided into 3,254 households or 4.28 people per household. The age group with the highest population are from ages 15 to 19, representing 10.55% of the total population. The age group with the lowest population are from ages 80 and above, representing only 0.50% of the total population.

According to the 2020 census, the population of Batingan grew from 6,473 in 1990 to 16,280 in 2020, an increase of 9,807 people over the course of 30 years. The figures in 2020 denote a growth rate of 3.33%, or an increase of 2,349 people, from the previous population of 13,931 in 2015.

== See also ==
- Binangonan
