= Mambog, Binangonan =

Mambog
- Mainland Barangay
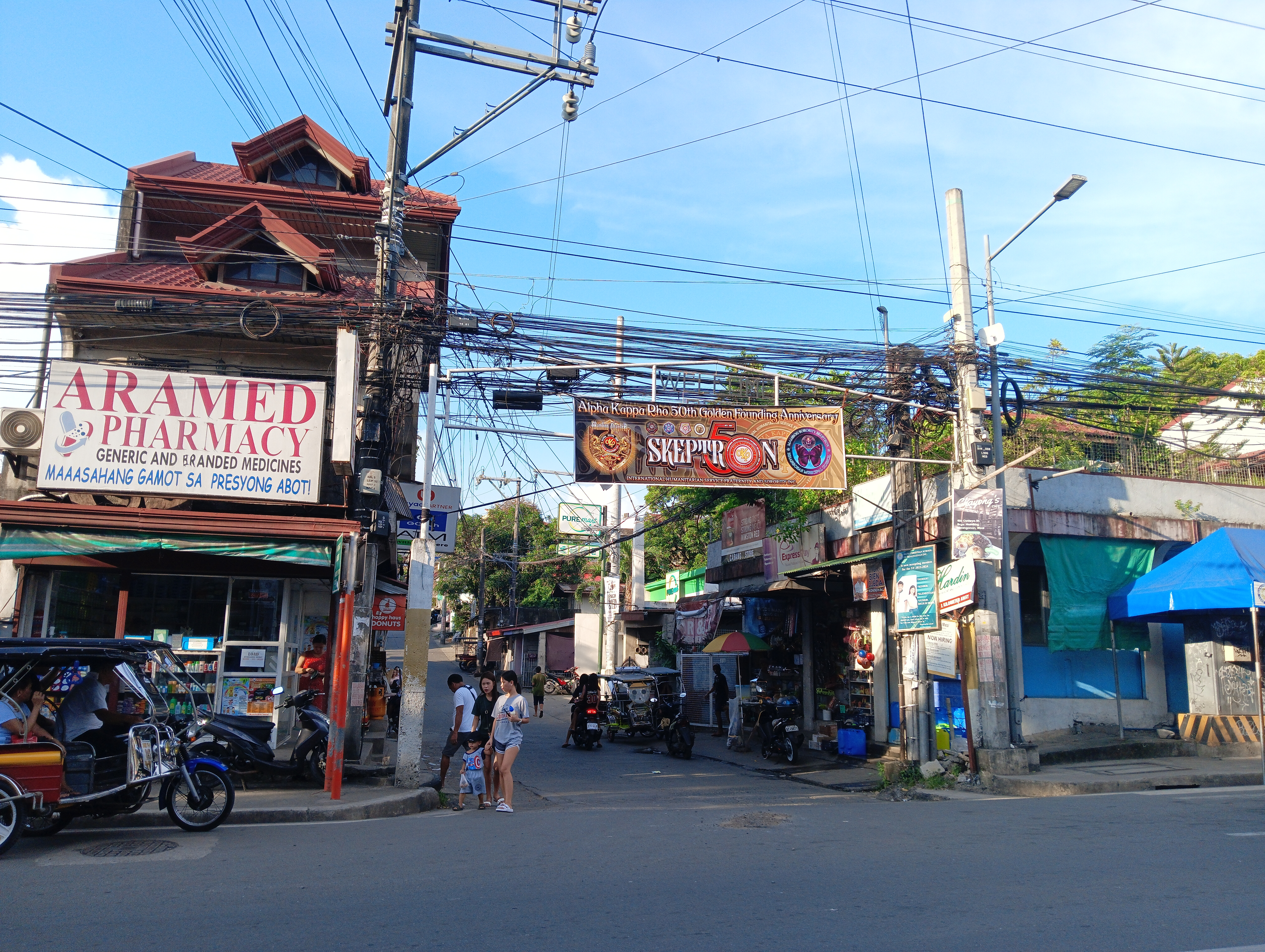
- Mambog in 2023

- Location of Mambog in the Philippines
- Coordinates: 14°28′53.2″N 121°12′43.3″E
- Country: Philippines
- Region: Region IV-A, Calabarzon
- Municipality: Binangonan, Rizal
- Barangay: Mambog

Government
  - Barangay captain: Leilani G. Pereira

Area
  - Land: 1.32 km^{2} (0.51 sq mi)
- Elevation: 85 m (279 ft)

Population (2020)
  - Total: 11,372
  - Density: 8,550.38/km^{2} (22,145.4/sq mi)
- Time zone: UTC+8 (PST)
- ZIP code: 1940

Mambog, officially Barangay Mambog is one of the mainland barangays of Binangonan, in the province of Rizal. Its population as determined by the 2020 Census was 11,372. This represented 3.63% of the total population of Binangonan.

== History ==
In 1898, the people of Mambog planned attacks against invading Americans. They've intercepted horse riding Americans killing 12 of them. In retaliation, Americans captured native males and turned the place into a concentration camp. The population of Mambog grew from 2,365 in 1990 to 11,372 in 2020, an increase of 9,007 people over the course of 30 years. The figures in 2020 denote a growth rate of 2.77%, or an increase of 1,384 people, from the previous population of 9,988 in 2015.

== Education ==
Mambog has only one public elementary school, Casimiro Ynares Elementary School. It also has several private schools such as Elim Christian School of Binangonan, and Bridge of Light Grace Christian Academy Inc.

== Festivals ==
Mambog's patron saint is Saint Joseph, it celebrates its patron every May 1. Mambog also celebrates Barangay Macamot's patron Saint Francis de Assisi every October.

== Location ==
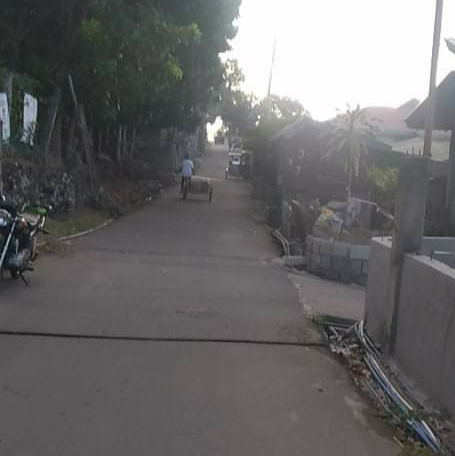
Catleya Street, Mambog in 2020

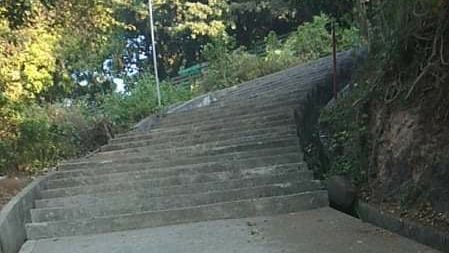
The uphill called "25 Ups" from Mambog

Mambog is located 2.87 kilometers away from the town proper, and 2.58 kilometers away from the municipal hall. It borders Barangay Tatala as its north and west, Batingan as southwest, and Mahabang Parang as its south. Mambog borders Barangay Looc of Cardona, Rizal as its east.

== See also ==
- Binangonan
- Rizal
- Batingan, Binangonan
