= Anino Games =

Video game developer

- Formerly: Anino Playlab, Anino Games, Inc
- Type: Private
- Industry: Interactive entertainment
- Founded: November 2001; 25 years ago
- Founder: Thomas Andreasen
- Headquarters: Makati, Metro Manila, Philippines
- Area served: Philippines
- Key people: Thomas Andreasen (CEO)
- Products: 60+ Games (as of 2026)
- Number of employees: 50
- Parent: Anino Pte Ltd
- Subsidiaries: Anino Limited
- Website: www.anino.co

Anino Games is a Philippine third-party game developer for different platforms founded by Niel Nagondon who is often acknowledged as the pioneer of the gaming industry in the Philippines. It is composed of two sister companies – Anino Entertainment, which focuses on PC, console, and virtual reality games, and Anino Mobile, which develops mobile games. The company takes its name from anino, a Tagalog word meaning "shadow".

Anino is often credited to be the first game development company in the Philippines. Among their award-winning original IPs are Anito: Defend a Land Enraged (IGF 2004), Anima Wars (IMGA 2006), Anito: Tersiago’s Wrath (Nokia Series60 challenge, Singapore 2003), Deep Interactive Pursuit (Best Casual Game nominee, IMGA 2007), and Word Archery (Indie Game Showcase 2007).

Anino Games is now known as Anino Inc. It currently focuses on developing a range of Social Casino Slots for mobile and PC.

In August 2014, Anino Games was acquired by Bangkok-based developer Pocket PlayLab and was renamed as Anino PlayLab.

== List of games ==
- Grave Mania: Pandemic Pandemonium
- Grave Mania: Undead Fever
- Dream Inn: Driftwood
- Cake Mania 4: Main Street
- Deal or No Deal: Vegas Gold
- Despicable Me: Minion Mania
- Pet Resort
- Mind's Eye: Secrets of the Forgotten
- Shutter Island
- Littlest Pet Shop
- Mysteries of Cleopatra
- Dream Day Wedding iPhone
- Turbo Subs iPhone
- Jumble Classic iPhone
- Flipper Deluxe
- Jumble Madness
- Moorhuhn Star Karts
- Pat Sajak’s Linked Letters
- ESPN’s Winter X Mobile
- Timothy and Titus
- Anito: Defend a Land Enraged

== Anino Entertainment ==
Established in November 2001, Anino Entertainment is a third-party game developer of PC and console games. In 2003, Anino released the first Filipino-made game, Anito: Defend A Land Enraged, a single-player role-playing game for the PC. Anito placed the Philippines on the video game industry world map and won two international awards: 2003 Gametunnel Role-Playing Game of the Year, and Innovation in Audio at the Independent Games Festival 2004 (also a finalist in all categories).

Anino Entertainment has also created numerous titles for various platforms including PDAs, TV games, and serious games for business applications such as virtual reality and industrial design. They finished production on their second PC game, Timothy and Titus, a Christian-themed casual game for children, which was released internationally at the end of 2006.

Anino Entertainment’s first casual game for PC called Word Archery won 2nd place at the Indie Game Developers Showcase in 2017.

== Anino Mobile ==
Anino Mobile was established in April 2005 by Anino Entertainment and develops games for mobile phones. Their games include Black Ops, Anito: Call of the Land, The One Hope, and Snakes On A Plane.

In October 2006, Anino Mobile was named a finalist in the International Mobile Gaming Awards. Their game Anima Wars was one of 25 finalists, chosen out of 400 studios from 42 countries around the world.

== See also ==
- Anito: Defend a Land Enraged
