= Armed Forces of the Philippines =

Military forces of the Philippines

- Sandatahang Lakas ng Pilipinas
- Seal of the Philippine Armed Forces

- Flag of the Armed Forces of the Philippines
- Motto: "Protecting the People, Securing the State"
- Founded: December 21, 1935 (90 years old)
- Service branches: Philippine Army; Philippine Air Force; Philippine Navy; Philippine Marine Corps
- Headquarters: Camp Aguinaldo, Quezon City, Philippines
- Website: www.afp.mil.ph/index.php

Leadership
- Commander-in-Chief: President Bongbong Marcos
- Secretary of National Defense: Gilbert Teodoro
- Chief of Staff: GEN Antonio Nafarrete, PA
- Vice Chief of Staff: LTGEN Rommel P. Roldan, PAF
- The Deputy Chief of Staff: LTGEN Edmundo G. Peralta, PA
- Armed Forces of the Philippines Sergeant Major: FCMS Feliciano M. Lazo, PA

Personnel
- Military age: 18–56 years old
- Conscription: Optional through Reserve Officers' Training Corps (ROTC), Basic Citizen's Military Training (BCMT) or voluntary service
- Active personnel: 154,870
- Reserve personnel: 71,000 Ready Reserve; 1,231,000 Standby Reserve (2026)

Expenditure
- Budget: ₱395.872 billion US$ 6.739 billion (2026)
- Percent of GDP: 1.35% (2026)

Industry
- Domestic suppliers: List: Government Arsenal; Philippine Aerospace Development Corporation; Steelcraft Industrial and Development Corporation; Asian Armored Vehicle Technologies Corporation; FERFRANS; Armscor (Philippines); Joavi Philippines Corporation; United Defense Manufacturing Corporation; Propmech Corporation; Colorado Shipyard; Philippine Iron Construction and Marine Works, Inc.; Aces Marine & Links Industrial Corporation; Scan Marine Inc.; Pacificfortia Marine Technologies, Inc.; Stone of David Corporation; Stoneworks Specialist International Corporation

Related articles
- History: Military history of the Philippines; List of wars involving the Philippines; List of conflicts in the Philippines List of engagements: Philippine Revolution; Spanish–American War; Philippine–American War; World War II; Korean War; Hukbalahap Rebellion; Communist Insurgencies; Vietnam War; Civil conflict in the Philippines; New People's Army rebellion; Gulf War; 1989 Coup d' Etat; United Nations Peacekeeping; War on terror; International Force East Timor; Operation Enduring Freedom - Philippines; Multi-National Force – Iraq; Iraq War; Oakwood mutiny; Manila Peninsula siege; Spratly Islands Dispute; Scarborough Shoal standoff; Moro conflict; Operation Darkhorse; War against the Islamic State; Battle of Camp Abubakar; Battle of Zamboanga; Philippine drug war; 2016 Butig clashes; Battle of Marawi; Anti-piracy operations in Sulu and Celebes Sea
- Ranks: Military ranks of the Philippines; Cadet rank in the Philippines

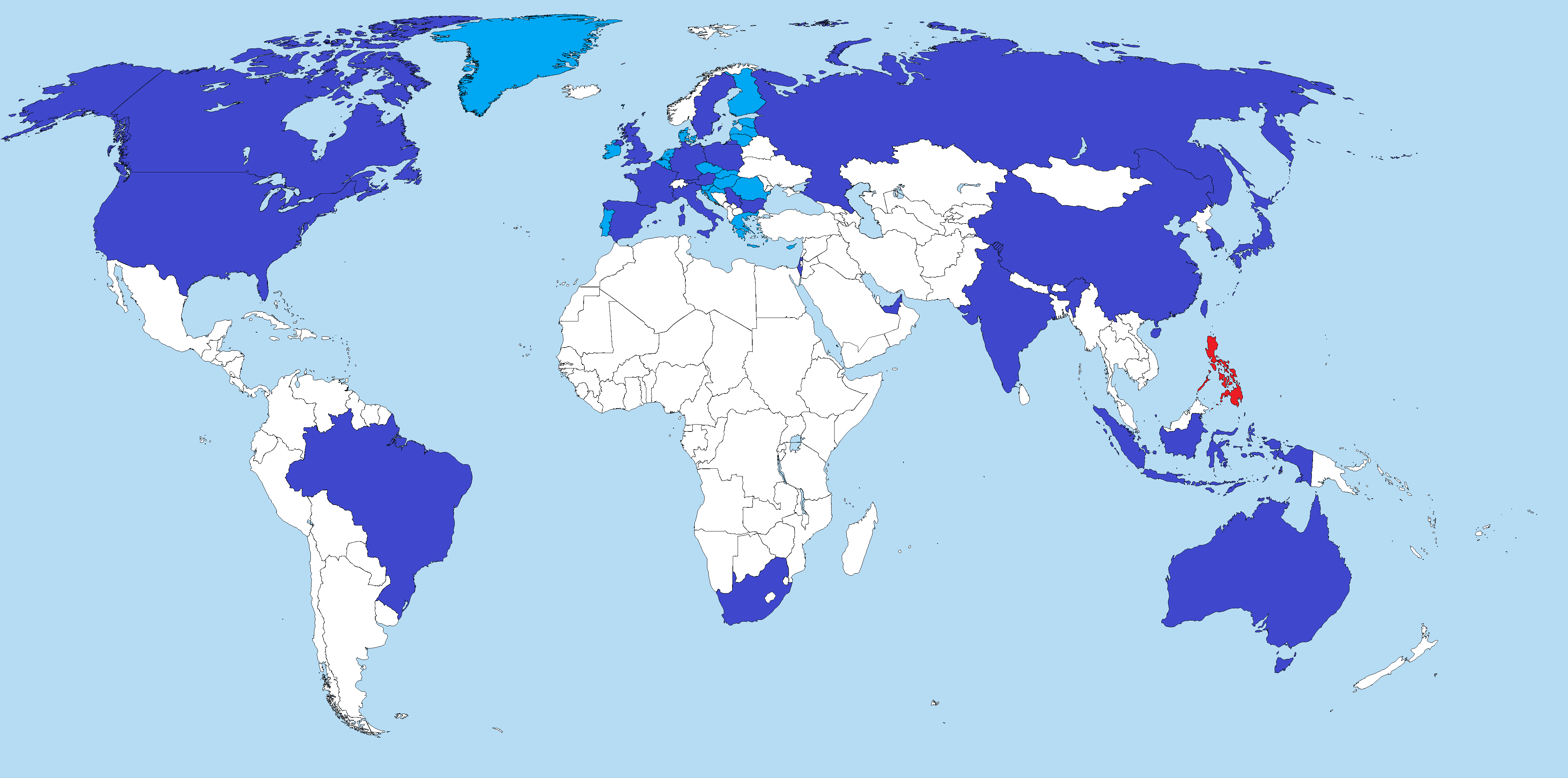
AFP foreign supplier countries (blue), including European Union members (light blue)

The Armed Forces of the Philippines (AFP) (Filipino: Sandatahang Lakas ng Pilipinas) are the military forces of the Philippines. It consists of three main service branches; the Army, the Air Force, and the Navy (including the Marine Corps). The President of the Philippines is the Commander-in-Chief of the AFP and forms military policy with the Department of National Defense, an executive department acting as the principal organ by which military policy is carried out, while the Chief of Staff of the Armed Forces of the Philippines serves as the overall commander and the highest-ranking officer in the AFP.

Founded under the National Defense Act of 1935, while tracing its roots to the Philippine Revolutionary Army, the AFP has played an integral part in the country's history. The AFP has also been involved in various conflicts, such as combatting rebellion against the Communist Party of the Philippines (CPP) and its attached organizations, the New People's Army (NPA) and the National Democratic Front of the Philippines (NDF), and operations against local Islamic terrorists in Mindanao. The AFP has also been part of various peacekeeping operations around the world, as part of its contribution to the United Nations. At present, military service is entirely voluntary.

As a result of the diminished number of active communist rebels and jihadist groups in the 2020s, the AFP has been shifting its primary focus from handling internal threats such as insurgency and local terrorism to defending the Philippine territory from external threats.

== Leadership ==
- Commander-in-Chief: President Bongbong Marcos
- Secretary of National Defense (SND): Secretary Gilberto C. Teodoro Jr., PAF (Res.)
- National Security Adviser: Secretary Eduardo SL. Oban Jr.
- Presidential Adviser on the West Philippine Sea: Secretary Andres C. Centino
- Presidential Adviser for Peace, Reconciliation and Unity: Sec. Mel Senen S. Sarmiento

Chief of Staff of the Armed Forces of the Philippines (CSAFP)	Appointed	Branch
General Antonio G. Nafarrete	July 21, 2026 (120 days)	Philippine Army
Vice Chief of Staff of the Armed Forces of the Philippines (VCSAFP)	Appointed	Branch
Lieutenant General Rommel P. Roldan	March 11, 2026 (252 days)	Philippine Air Force
The Deputy Chief of Staff of the Armed Forces of the Philippines (TDCSAFP)	Appointed	Branch
Lieutenant General Edmundo G. Peralta	May 19, 2026 (183 days)	Philippine Army
Commanding General of the Philippine Army (CGPA)	Appointed	Branch
Lieutenant General Donald M. Gumiran	July 21, 2026 (120 days)	Philippine Army
Flag Officer-in-Command of the Philippine Navy (FOIC-PN)	Appointed	Branch
Vice Admiral Alan M. Javier	November 13, 2026 (5 days)	Philippine Navy
Commanding General of the Philippine Air Force (CGPAF)	Appointed	Branch
Lieutenant General Arthur M. Cordura	December 19, 2024 (1 year, 334 days)	Philippine Air Force
Commandant of the Philippine Marine Corps (CMDT-PMC)	Appointed	Branch
Major General Bob R. Apostol	October 5, 2026 (44 days)	Philippine Marine Corps
Armed Forces of the Philippines Sergeant Major (AFPSM)	Appointed	Branch
First Chief Master Sergeant Feliciano M. Lazo	August 22, 2023 (3 years, 88 days)	Philippine Army

== History ==
Pre-colonial Philippines maintained local militia groups under the barangay system. Reporting to the datu, these groups, aside from maintaining order in their communities, also served as their defense forces. With the arrival of Islam, the system of defense forces in the Mindanao region's sultanates under Muslim control mirrored those other existing sultanates in the region. These local warriors who were in the service of the Sultan were also responsible to qualified male citizens appointed by him.

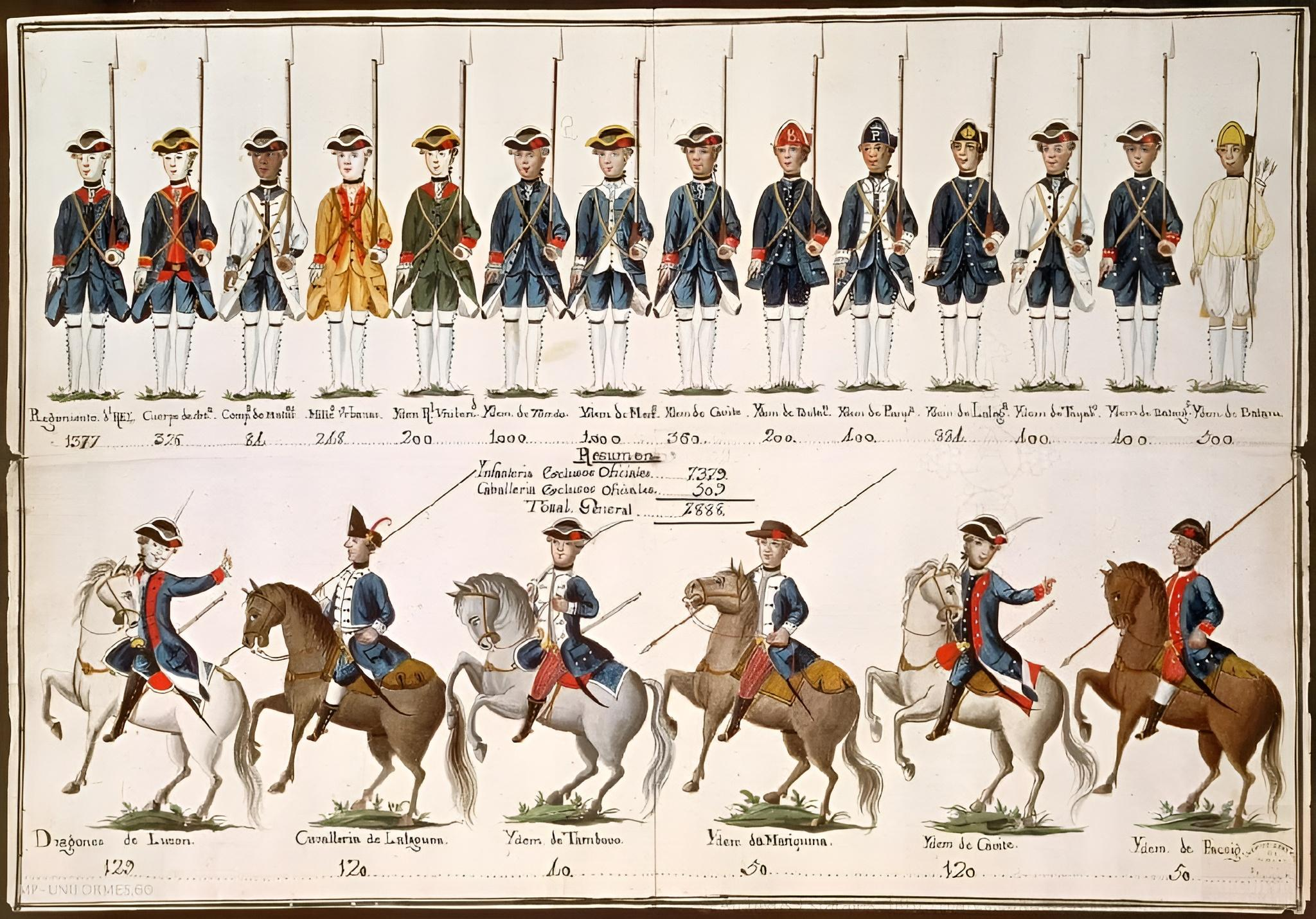
Designs of 20 uniforms of the Infantry Troop, Dragoons and Cavalry of the Philippines. 1780.

During the Spanish colonial period, the Spanish Army was responsible for the defense and general order of the archipelago in the land, while the Spanish Navy conducts maritime policing in the seas as well as providing naval logistics to the Army. The Guardia Civil took police duties and maintaining public order in villages and towns. In the early years of Spanish colonial era, most of the formations of the army were composed of conquistadors backed with native auxiliaries. By the 18th and 19th centuries, line infantry and cavalry formations were created composed of mixed Spanish and Filipino personnel, as well as volunteer battalions composed of all-Filipino volunteers during the later half of the 19th Century. Units from other colonies were also levied to augment the existing formations in the Philippines. Almost all of the formations of the Spanish Army in the archipelago participated in the local religious uprisings between 17th and 19th centuries, and in the Philippine Revolution in 1896 fighting against the revolutionary forces. At the peak of the revolution, some Filipinos and a few Spaniards in the Spanish Army, Guardia Civil, and Navy defected to the Philippine Revolutionary Army.

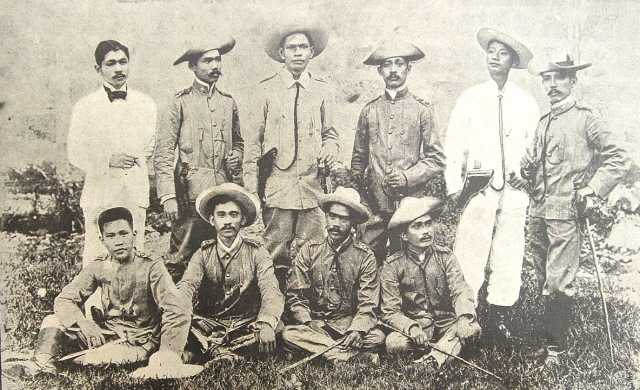
General Emilio Aguinaldo's aides wearing Rayadillo and white drill military uniforms.

The Spanish cession of the Philippines in the 1898 Treaty of Paris put the independence of the newly declared Southeast Asian republic in grave danger. The revolutionaries were fighting desperately as the American forces already landed in other islands and had taken over towns and villages. The Americans established the Philippine Constabulary in 1901 manned by Filipino fighters and used against Gen. Aguinaldo who was later captured. The Philippine-American War was officially ended on April 16, 1902, with the surrender of General Miguel Malvar. This date of official ending of the war was affirmed President Gloria Macapagal Arroyo on April 9, 2002, during the centennial celebration of the end of war. Since the beginning of American rule in the Philippines, the United States Army had taken the responsibility for the defense of the country in the land, and the United States Navy in the seas until the passage of the National Defense Act of 1935 which called for a separate defense force for the Philippines.

=== Creation and the Commonwealth Era ===
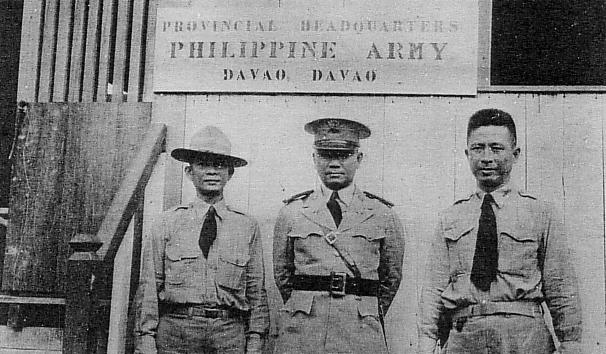
Philippine Commonwealth Army personnel

In accordance with the National Defense Act of 1935, the Armed Forces of the Philippines was officially established on December 21, 1935, when the act entered into force. Retired U.S. General Douglas MacArthur was asked to supervise its foundation and training. MacArthur accepted the offer and became a Field Marshal of the Philippines, a rank no other person has since held. Jean MacArthur, his wife, found the situation amusing and remarked that her husband had gone from holding the highest rank in the United States Army to holding the highest rank in a non-existent army. President Quezon officially conferred the title of Field Marshal on MacArthur in a ceremony at Malacañan Palace on August 24, 1936, when he appeared with a gold marshal's baton and a unique uniform.

The Army of the Philippines included naval and air assets directly reporting to Army headquarters, and the Philippine Constabulary, later part of the ground forces proper as a division. In 1938 the Constabulary Division was separated from the army and reorganized into a national police force.

The administration of the military throughout the islands was divided into ten "military districts."

Military District	Areas Covered
1st	North Luzon
2nd	Lingayen and the Central Plain
3rd	East Central Luzon, Bataan, and Zambales
4th	South Central Luzon, including Manila, Batangas, Palawan, and Mindoro
5th	East and Southeast Luzon and Catanduanes
6th	Tablas, Panay, and Marinduque
7th	Negros
8th	Bohol and Cebu
9th	Samar and Leyte
10th	Mindanao and Sulu

MacArthur expanded the Army of the Philippines with the revival of the Navy in 1940 and the formation of the Philippine Army Air Corps (formerly the Philippine Constabulary Air Corps), but they were not ready for combat at the start of the Pacific War in December 1941 and unable to defeat the 1941–42 Japanese invasion of the Philippines.

=== World War II ===
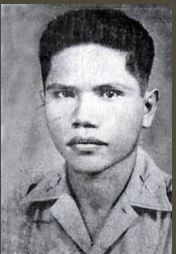
Captain Juan Pajota.

In 1940–41, most soldiers of the Philippine military were incorporated in the U.S. Army Forces Far East (USAFFE), with MacArthur appointed as its commander. USAFFE made its last stand on Corregidor Island, after which Japanese forces were able to force all remaining Filipino and American troops to surrender. The establishment of the general headquarters of the Philippine Commonwealth Army are military station went to the province during the occupation. Those who survived the invasion but escaped from the Japanese formed the basis of recognized guerrilla units and ongoing local military force of the Philippine Commonwealth Army that continued the fighting against the enemy all over the islands. The Philippine Constabulary went on active service under the Armed Forces of the Philippines during liberation.

=== Postwar Era ===
After Japan was defeated in World War II, the Philippines gained its independence in 1946. (This was its second independence after the Philippine Declaration of Independence in 1898).

The pre-war military districts briefly continued to be used for administering the military, until they were reorganized into Military Area Commands in 1946.

In 1947 the modern AFP first emerged with the upgrade of the PAAC to the Philippine Air Force.

1950 saw the creation of the Philippine Marine Corps, a naval infantry force under the command of the Philippine Navy, after then-Defense Secretary Ramon Magsaysay ordered Commodore Ramon Alcaraz to go to study the organization of the U.S. Marines. Alcaraz recommended the creation of the new service, earning him the distinction of being the "Father" of the Philippine Marine Corps.

=== 1950 delineation of service commands ===
A major revamp in the Armed Forces was effected on March 30, 1950, when President Elpidio Quirino issued Executive Order No. 308 which called for the merger of the Philippine Constabulary with the Armed Forces, making it one more major service command. This was the second time the PC returned to a military force. Due to the unstable peace and order conditions existing in the countrysides brought about by the resurgence of the Hukbalahap (Huk) which require more personnel strength, the Philippine Army was called upon to assist in the pacification drive with the employment of its combat arms – the Battalion Combat Teams or BCTs, with PC men absorbed by the BCTs. It was under E.O. 308 and according to Administrative Order No. 113, dated April 1, 1950, the PC was formally merged with the Armed Forces of the Philippines; the merger was completed on July 27, the same year. 12,000 men from the MPC to the PC.

Under the E.O., the power of executive supervision and all authority and duties exercised by the Secretary of Interior concerning the PC or its members were transferred to and exercised by the Secretary of National Defense. With the appointment, on American advice, of former USAFFE guerilla Rep. Ramon Magsaysay as Secretary of National Defense in September 1950 and the subsequent appropriation by Congress of more funds for the drive against the Communist movement in the Philippines, more BCTs were formed.

The delineation of the missions of the then four major service commands – Philippine Army, Philippine Constabulary, Philippine Navy, and Philippine Air Force – were underlined by EO No. 389 dated December 23, 1950, which abolished the Philippine Service Command and the Philippine Ground Force. Headquarters Armed Forces of the Philippines became known as "General Headquarters, Armed Forces of the Philippines"; while General Headquarters, Philippine Constabulary became known as "Headquarters, Philippine Constabulary", the nomenclature it had in the prewar years. Also, the major commands were abolished and in their places were activated the four major services. As defined in Executive Order (E.O.) No. 389, the main function of the PC was maintaining peace and order within the country and to be the country's national police force even though it was a branch then of the military.

In the reorganization that followed, the four military areas created under EO No. 94, series 1947, were not altered substantially but were nevertheless placed under the administrative and operational control of the AFP General Headquarters.

=== Operations in Korea, Vietnam, and against the Hukbalahap ===
During the Korean War from 1951 to 1953, the Philippines sent various AFP battalions, known as the Philippine Expeditionary Forces to Korea (PEFTOK) to fight as part of the US-led United Nations Command in liberating South Korea from the invading North Korean troops.

Throughout this time, the AFP had been in conflict with various elements of the Hukbalahap which, still known as the "huks", were reconstituted as the Hukbong Mapagpalaya ng Bayan ("Peoples' Liberation Army")the armed wing of the Marxist–Leninist Partido Komunista ng Pilipinas of 1930 (PKP-1930). This conflict effectively ended in 1954, with the huks becoming a spent force during the presidency of Ramon Magsaysay.

In 1966, an AFP battalion was also sent into South Vietnam during the Vietnam War to ameliorate the economic and social conditions of its people there. AFP units were also sent at the same time to the Spratly Islands.

1963 would see the first women join the ranks of the armed forces with the raising of the Women's Auxiliary Corps.

=== Martial law ===
President Ferdinand Marcos sought to have a strong personal influence over the Armed Forces as soon as he became president in 1965, holding on to the portfolio of defense secretary in the first thirteen months of his presidency to develop what scholars have noted to be "a patronage system within the defense establishment." The portfolio afforded him direct interaction with the AFP's leadership, and to have a hand in the AFP's day-to-day operationalization.

Upon the declaration of martial law in 1972, Marcos used the AFP as what the Davide Commission Report would later call his "martial law implementor," and "one of the vital supports of the regime." Upon the announcement of Martial Law in 1972, one of their earliest tasks was that of quickly arresting and containing Marcos' political opponents, and Marcos' hold on power was effectively broken once enough of the Military withdrew their support from him in February 1986. Antonio Parlade notes that to get the military to ensure their cooperation, Marcos "had to expand the military organization and patronize the generals to buy their loyalty."

Marcos oversaw a significant expansion of the AFP, which grew from a force of 57,100 in 1971 to a 97.89 percent increase of 113,000 personnel in 1976 - a significant increase of over a five-year period. He also increased the military budget from P880 million in 1972 to P4 billion in 1976. Marcos also instituted the AFP Self Reliance Defense Posture (SRDP) program, which was supposed to enable the AFP to construct its own weapons, tanks, armored vehicles, ships, gunboats, and aircraft locally instead of buying from foreign sources. This included "Project Santa Barbara" under the Philippine Navy, which saw the testing of the Bongbong II MLRS - named after Marcos' son - in 1972. However, the project was discontinued before the Marcos administration ended.

The military was given many functions aside from its task of national defense, including assisting in the implementation of price controls imposed on key products like corn and rice, enforcing the rules of the national corn procurement program, assisting in the collection of rural and government bank loans, implementing the agrarian reform law, and various police functions such as collecting unlicensed firearms and enforcing curfews, and suppressing strikes, rallies, and other demonstrations.

Marcos carried out the "largest reshuffle in the history of the armed forces" when he forcibly retired fourteen of the AFP's twenty-five flag officers, including the AFP Chief of Staff, the AFP Vice Chief of Staff, the commanding general of the Philippine Army, the Chief of the Philippine Constabulary, the commanders of all four Constabulary Zones, and one third of all Provincial Commanders of the PC. Other key officers critical of Marcos, such as Commodore Ramon Alcaraz, were compelled to leave the service. In their place, Marcos appointed officers from his home region, the Ilocos, the most significant of whom had familial connections to Marcos – ensuring their familial and regionalistic loyalties to him.

Among the most prominent such appointments were that of General Fabian Ver as commander of the Presidential Security Command in 1965, and AFP chief of staff in 1981; Juan Ponce Enrile as Secretary of Defense from 1970 to 1986; and General Fidel Ramos as chief for the Philippine Constabulary, and later as Armed Forces Vice Chief from 1981 to 1986.

Generals loyal to Marcos were allowed to stay in their positions past their supposed retirement age, or were rewarded with civilian government posts. This led to a loss of morale among the middle-ranks of the AFP, because it meant a significant slowdown in promotions and caused many officers to retire with ranks much lower than they would otherwise have earned.

Several cabals of dissatisfied officers eventually formed among the middle-ranks of the AFP, most notably the Reform the Armed Forces Movement in the early 1980s.

The Marcos administration is thus considered to have marked a decline for AFP in terms of its traditional values of civilian supremacy and professionalism, leading to a need for security sector reform during later administrations, as per the recommendations of the Davide Commission in 1990 and the Feliciano Commission in 2003.

Civilian and military historians alike agree that "human rights abuses by the troops became rampant" during the Marcos administration, as documented by international monitoring entities such as Amnesty International. Units often specifically cited in these reported incidents include the Metrocom Intelligence and Security Group (MISG), and the 5th Constabulary Security Unit (5CSU) of the Philippine Constabulary, as well as the Intelligence Service Armed Forces of the Philippines (ISAFP). The Presidential Security Unit and the National Intelligence and Security Agency (NISA) were also accused of aiding these activities. Aside from human rights abuses, these units were also accused of hounding media entities, corporate management, and opposition groups with threats, intimidation, and violence.

The Marcos administration also marked the beginnings of at least two long-running conflicts that continued to plague later administrations: the Moro conflict and the New People's Army conflict.

The Moro conflict, began in earnest in 1968 when short-lived organizations such as the Muslim Independence Movement and the Bangsamoro Liberation Organization formed in reaction to news about the Jabidah Massacre, with many of their forces eventually coalescing as the Moro National Liberation Front was formed in 1972.

Meanwhile, the Communist Party of the Philippines (CPP) was formed in 1968, while the New People's Army (NPA), founded in 1969, grew nationwide to a 200,000 strong force.

=== EDSA Revolution ===
Due to what was popularly believed to be electoral fraud during the 1986 Philippine presidential election, February 1986 saw a period of uncertainty. A boycott movement and plans for massive civilian protests were in place.

During the chaos, the Reform the Armed Forces Movement headed by then Defense Minister Juan Ponce Enrile decided to stage a military coup against Marcos. The plot was uncovered, however, and the forces involved became trapped in Camp Aguinaldo in Quezon City. They then sought and received the support of Philippine Constabulary chief and AFP Vice-Chief of Staff LtGen Fidel V. Ramos in the neighboring Camp Crame, but even with Ramos' defection, their forces were trapped in the two neighboring camps.

Manila's Catholic Archbishop, Jaime Sin, went on Radio Veritas and called for people to go to the section of Epifanio de los Santos Avenue in between the two camps and help protect the rebel forces. Since civilian groups were already planning massive protests in relation to the election results, a large crowd was able to gather and prevent Marcos' forces from attacking camps Aguinaldo and Crame. This civilian uprising, which would come to be known as the People Power Revolution, led to various units of the AFP refusing orders to fire on the camps and the civilians protecting them, and led to the removal Marcos from power. Corazon Aquino was then installed as the new president of the Philippines.

Shortly after midnight on February 26, five army trucks of troops under the command of Fidel Ramos arrived in Malacañang Palace to secure it after Ferdinand Marcos had left, and various individuals had entered it, marking the end of Marcos' reign, and placing the palace under the control of the Provisional Government of the Philippines until a new constitution could be enacted a year later, in 1987.

=== Later 20th century ===
During Corazon Aquino's administration, most of the military units remained loyal to her as she dealt with various coup attempts against her, either by military factions that remained loyal to the former dictator, or by the Reform the Armed Forces Movement. The 1989 coup attempt, the bloodiest of all coup attempts against her, was crushed with US help.

Following the 1989 coup attempt, President Aquino established a Fact-Finding Commission headed by COMELEC Chairman Hilario Davide Jr. to investigate and provide a full report on the series of coup attempts. When it came out, The Davide Commission Report recommended several short-term and long-term counter-measures, including the establishment of a civilian national police force, a crackdown on corruption in the military, a performance review of appointive government officials, reforms in the process of military promotions, a review of election laws in time for the 1992 presidential elections, and a definitive statement on the part of Aquino on whether she intended to run for re-election in 1992. The publication of the recommendations of the report is considered one of the key starting points of security sector reform in the Philippines.

The AFP, during her term also launched a massive campaign against the CPP-NPA after a brief hiatus and also against the Moro National Liberation Front (MNLF) in the south.

In 1991, the major services of the AFP were reduced from four to three, when the Philippine Constabulary or PC, an AFP major service tasked to enforce the law and to curb criminality, was formally merged with the country's Integrated National Police, a national police force on the cities and municipalities in the country attached to the PC to become the Philippine National Police, thus removing it from AFP control and it was civilianized by a law passed by Congress, therefore becoming under the Department of the Interior and Local Government as a result.

=== Contemporary history ===
In 2000, on President Joseph Estrada's orders, the AFP launched an all-out offensive against the Moro Islamic Liberation Front, a breakaway group of the MNLF that wants to proclaim Mindanao an independent state. The AFP succeeded in capturing the MILF's main headquarters, Camp Abubakar on July 9.

The AFP played a key role in the two-day Edsa Dos People Power revolt in 2001; the revolution removed Estrada from power and installed then vice-president Gloria Macapagal Arroyo as president.

Since 2001, the Armed Forces of the Philippines has been active in supporting the war on terror and has been attacking terrorist groups in Mindanao ever since. In 2012, the AFP Chief of Staff said that there had been no increase in the number of soldiers over a long period, and that the military aimed to hire 30,000 troops in three years.

In 2013, the AFP successfully quelled the Zamboanga City attacks of the Moro National Liberation Front, which proclaimed the independence of the short-lived Bangsamoro Republik.

After the signing of the Comprehensive Agreement on the Bangsamoro in 2014, the AFP has played a key part in the normalization process with the MILF, which includes "the decommissioning of MILF combatants and their weapons and the transformation of several camps into productive and resilient communities," developing a close working relationship with the Philippine National Police and the MILF-Bangsamoro Islamic Armed Forces (BIAF) in the pursuit of peace in the Bangsamoro.

In 2016, the AFP clashed with the Maute group on Butig on February, late May to early June, and on November of 2016.

Under President Rodrigo Duterte in May 2017, the AFP thwarted the ISIS militants' attempt to establish a foothold in the Philippines in the five-month-long siege to retake Marawi from militant occupation. The AFP called President Duterte to declare Martial Law under Proclamation No. 216. Additionally, the AFP and the NTF-ELCAC were at the forefront of Duterte's intensified campaign against the communist rebellion; by the end of Duterte's term, the AFP reported the reduction of NPA guerrilla fronts from 89 to 23, and only 2,000 remained of more than 25,000 "members, supporters, and sympathizers of the underground movement".

In 2024, the number of active communist rebels in the NPA reached a low of 1,500, with the AFP aiming to neutralize them by the end of the year. As a result of the development, the AFP under the Bongbong Marcos administration has been shifting its focus away from handling internal threats towards defending Philippine territory from external threats such as China's encroachment in the West Philippine Sea.

== Organization and branches ==
Department of National Defense Building, Camp Aguinaldo

The 1987 Philippine Constitution placed the AFP under the control of a civilian, the President of the Philippines, who acts as its Commander-in-Chief. All of its branches are part of the Department of National Defense, which is headed by the Secretary of National Defense.

The AFP has three major services:

- Philippine Army (PA) – Hukbong Katihan ng Pilipinas
- Philippine Navy (PN) – Hukbong Dagat ng Pilipinas
  - Philippine Marine Corps (PMC) – Hukbong Kawal Pandagat ng Pilipinas
- Philippine Air Force (PAF) – Hukbong Himpapawid ng Pilipinas

These three major services are unified under the Chief of Staff of the Armed Forces of the Philippines (CSAFP) who normally holds the rank of General/Admiral. The AFP Chief of Staff is primarily assisted by:

- The Vice Chief of Staff of the AFP (VCSAFP)
- The Deputy Chief of Staff of the AFP (TDCSAFP)

Both normally holding the rank of Lieutenant General/Vice Admiral.

The three highest posts of the AFP are also assisted by the Secretary Joint Staff (SJSAFP), who serves as the primary executive officer for the AFP Chief of Staff, the Vice Chief of Staff, and The Deputy Chief of Staff.

Each of the three major branches and key major commands are headed by an officer with the following titles:

- Commanding General of the Philippine Army (CG, PA) - Lieutenant General
- Flag Officer in-Command of the Philippine Navy (FOIC, PN) - Vice Admiral
- Commanding General of the Philippine Air Force (CG, PAF) - Lieutenant General
- Commander, Combatant Commands (Lieutenant General/Vice Admiral)
- Superintendent, Philippine Military Academy (Lieutenant General/Vice Admiral)
- The Inspector General (Lieutenant General/Vice Admiral)
- Commander, AFP Intelligence Command (Lieutenant General/Vice Admiral)
- Commander, AFP Joint Sustainment Command (Lieutenant General/Vice Admiral)
- Commander, AFP Strategic Command (Lieutenant General/Vice Admiral)
- Commander, Civil-Military Operations Command, AFP (Lieutenant General/Vice Admiral)

Meanwhile, the Chief of Staff of the AFP is also assisted by the 10 following office holders carry the rank of Major General/Rear Admiral, who serves as the members of the Joint Staff Divisions, at the General Headquarters in Camp Aguinaldo. These Joint Staff Divisions are also part of the Joint Staff, which is composed of the AFP Chief of Staff, the Vice Chief of Staff and The Deputy Chief of Staff.

- Deputy Chief of Staff for Personnel, J1
- Deputy Chief of Staff for Intelligence, J2
- Deputy Chief of Staff for Operations, Organization & Training, J3
- Deputy Chief of Staff for Logistics, J4
- Deputy Chief of Staff for Plans, J5
- Deputy Chief of Staff for Command, Control, Communications, Computers, Intelligence, Surveillance, Targeting Acquisition and Reconnaissance, J6
- Deputy Chief of Staff for Civil-Military Operations, J7
- Deputy Chief of Staff for Education, Training and Doctrine, J8
- Deputy Chief of Staff for Reserve Force Development, J9
- Deputy Chief of Staff for Financial Management, J10

The AFP also comprises the Special Staff, which is divided into two separate groups. These groups also assist the AFP Chief on their designated fields:

- The Administrative Staff:
  - The Inspector General of the AFP (TIG)
  - The Adjutant General (TAG)
  - The Judge Advocate General (TJAG)
  - The Chief, Chaplain Service (TCCS)
  - The Provost Marshal General (TPMG)
  - The Chief, Special Services (TCSPS)
  - The Chief, Historical Activities (TCHA)
  - The Chief, Doctrines Development (TCDD)
- The Technical Staff:
  - The Chief Engineer
  - The Chief for Ordnance and Chemical Service
  - The Quartermaster General
  - The Surgeon General
  - The Chief Nurse

The AFP Chief of Staff is also assisted by the following office commanding division-sized troops holders carry the rank of Major General/Rear Admiral:

- Army Division Commanders
- Naval Command Commanders
- Air Command Commanders
- The Commandant of the Philippine Marine Corps

On June 19, 2020, under the DND Order no. 174, the AFP had major changes in renaming its positions in high-ranking officials, such as the following:

- Chief of Staff of the AFP - Chairman of the Joint Chiefs
- Vice Chief of Staff of the AFP - Vice Chairman of the Joint Chiefs
- The Deputy Chief of Staff of the AFP - Chief of the Joint Staff
- Commander, Unified Command - Joint Forces Commander, Unified Command
- Deputy Chief of Staff for (functional area) (J-staff) - Deputy Chief of the Joint Staff for (functional area)
- Commanding General of the Philippine Army - Chief of the Army
- Flag Officer in-Command - Chief of the Navy
- Commanding General of the Philippine Air Force - Chief of the Air Force

However, the AFP has deferred these title changes a few months later as President Rodrigo Duterte revoked the usage of the position titles, and decided to maintain the traditional position titles.

=== Geographical Combatant Commands ===
Units from these three services may be assigned to one of six "Combatant Commands" led by each Commander; consisting of units from the three branches of the AFP, which are multi-service, regional entities. The Combatant Commands are responsible in monitoring, securing and defending their specific geographical area of operations within the Philippines. There are currently six Combatant Commands in the AFP, with each Commander of the Combatant Commands hold the rank of Lieutenant General/Vice Admiral, and reports directly to the office of the Chief of Staff of the Armed Forces of the Philippines.

- Northern Luzon Command (NOLCOM) (Ilocos Region, Cordillera Administrative Region, Cagayan Valley, and Central Luzon, including the Scarborough Shoal and the Benham Rise)
- National Capital Region Command (NCRCOM)
- Southern Luzon Command (SOLCOM) (Calabarzon; Mimaropa excluding Palawan, and Bicol Region)
- Visayas Command (VISCOM) (Western Visayas, Central Visayas, Eastern Visayas)
- Western Command (WESCOM) (Palawan and the Spratly Islands)
- Eastern Mindanao Command (EASTMINCOM) (Davao Region, Soccsksargen, and the Caraga regions)
- Western Mindanao Command (WESTMINCOM) (Zamboanga Peninsula, Northern Mindanao, and the BARMM)

==== Commanders, Geographical Combatant Commands ====
Commander, Northern Luzon Command	Appointed	Branch
Lieutenant General Aristotle D. Gonzalez	October 16, 2025 (1 year, 33 days)	Philippine Air Force
Commander, Southern Luzon Command	Appointed	Branch
Lieutenant General Cerilo C. Balaoro Jr.	July 7, 2025 (1 year, 134 days)	Philippine Army
Commander, Visayas Command	Appointed	Branch
Lieutenant General Moises L. Micor	October 5, 2026 (2 days)	Philippine Air Force
Commander, Western Command	Appointed	Branch
Rear Admiral Richard N. Gonzaga	April 17, 2026 (2 days)	Philippine Navy
Commander, Eastern Mindanao Command	Appointed	Branch
Lieutenant General Adonis Ariel G. Orio	November 15, 2025 (1 year, 3 days)	Philippine Army
Commander, Western Mindanao Command	Appointed	Branch
Major General Jose Vladimir R. Cagara (Acting)	August 17, 2026 (93 days)	Philippine Army
Commander, National Capital Region Command	Appointed	Branch
Major General Gregorio B. Hernandez	October 21, 2025 (1 year, 28 days)	Philippine Marine Corps

=== Joint Organizational Support Units ===
Several organization-wide support services and separate units report directly to the General Headquarters, Armed Forces of the Philippines (GHQ, AFP).

The units are the:

- General Headquarters & Headquarters Service Command (GHQ & HSC)
- Presidential Security Command (PSC)
- Philippine Military Academy (PMA)
- Education and Training Command, AFP (ETC, AFP). The organizations under it include:
  - Armed Forces of the Philippines Command and General Staff College (AFPCGSC)
  - AFP Officer Candidate School
- AFP Health Service Command. The organizations under it include:
  - Medical Center, AFP (MC, AFP)
  - Armed Forces of the Philippines Dental Service Center (AFPDSC)
- Special Operations Command (Philippine Army)
- AFP Joint Special Operations Command (AFPJSOC)
- Reserve Command, AFP (RESCOM, AFP)
- Commissary and Exchange Service, AFP (CES, AFP)
- Communications, Electronics and Information System Service, AFP (CEISSAFP)
- Intelligence Service, AFP (ISAFP)
- AFP Cyber Command
- Counterintelligence Group (CIG)
- AFP Doctrine Development Center (AFPDDC)
- Peacekeeping Operations Center (PKOC, AFP)
- Citizen Armed Force Geographical Unit (CAFGU)
- AFP Intelligence Command
- AFP Joint Sustainment Command
- AFP Strategic Command
- Civil-Military Operations Command, AFP - formerly known as the Civil Relations Service, AFP (CRSAFP)

=== Former branches ===
The Philippine Constabulary (PC) was a gendarmerie type military-police force of the Philippines established in 1901 by the United States-appointed administrative authority, replacing the Guardia Civil of the Spanish colonial regime. On December 13, 1990, Republic Act No. 6975 was approved, organizing the Philippine National Police (PNP) consisting of the members of the Integrated National Police (INP) and the officers and enlisted personnel of the PC. Upon the effectivity of that Act, the PC ceased to be a major service of the Armed Forces of the Philippines and the INP ceased to be the national police and civil defense force. On January 29, 1991, the PC and the INP were formally retired and the PNP was activated in their place.

The Philippine Coast Guard (PCG) is also another attached agency to the Armed Forces of the Philippines, but due to the civilian nature of the PCG functions led to the separation of the Coast Guard from the Philippine Navy on March 30, 1998, by virtue of Executive Order 475 signed by President Fidel Ramos. The Order effectively transferred the PCG from the Department of National Defense to the Office of the President, and eventually to the Department of Transportation and Communications (DOTC) on April 15, 1998, by virtue of Executive Order 477.

=== Defunct former commands ===
- AFP Joint Task Force-National Capital Region (AFP JTF-NCR)
- Eastern Command
- Central Luzon Command (CELCOM)
- Central Mindanao Command (CENMINCOM)
- Southern Command (SOUTHCOM)
- Home Defense Command (HDC)
- Internal Defense Command (IDC)
- National Development Support Command (NADESCOM)

== Reforms and modernization ==
The AFP is one of the "core security actors" that are the focus of security sector governance and reform in the Philippines, which involves civilianizing, professionalizing, modernizing, and capacitating the Philippine government's security institutions to align them good governance and to principles such as human rights, freedom of information, and the rule of civilian law. This has been a continuing process since the establishment of the Fifth Philippine Republic after the 1986 People Power Revolution, before the concept had even been fully defined internationally in the 1990s.

=== Civilianization ===
The need to assert civilian control of the military was a reform agenda which began being addressed almost as soon as Ferdinand Marcos was deposed by the 1986 People Power Revolution; within a year of Marcos' ouster, the 1987 Constitution of the Philippines enshrined the principle of civilian supremacy over the military. After the various coup attempts of the 1980s, the recommendations of the Davide Commission included the dissolution of the Philippine Constabulary as a service under the AFP, resulting in the eventual creation of the civilian Philippine National Police. In 1998, Executive Orders 475 and 477 asserting the civilian nature of the Philippine Coast Guard and transferring it from the Philippine Navy to the Department of Transportation and Communications (DOTC) were signed by President Fidel Ramos.

In a December 2013 paper for the National Defense College of the Philippines’ National Security Review, former Department of National Defense Undersecretary Rodel Cruz identified some aspects of civilianization which need attention under security sector reform as:

- Increasing civilian capacity for defense management;
- Establishing an active constituency supportive of Security Sector Reform;
- Prudent budget preparation and execution;
- Supporting a local defense industry;
- Intelligent and coherent policy development and execution; and
- the passage of an updated National Defense Act.

==== Involvement of Civil Society ====
For the most part, oversight of the Philippine state's security actors has fallen on government agencies through the constitutional system of checks and balances - most prominently, congress and the Commission on Human Rights. But civil society organizations have also become involved in civilianizing, professionalizing, modernizing, and capacitating the Philippine state's security institutions, depending on how much emphasis each President, as Commander in Chief, places on civil society engagement.

Given a greater emphasis on Philippine Defense Reform (PDR) beginning in 2010, a shift towards engagement with Civil Society Organizations was put in place under the Internal Peace and Security Plan (IPSP) of 2010, and similar principles were enshrined in the 2016 AFP-Development Support and Security Plan (DSSP) of the next administration. However, civil society is no longer identified as a major strategic priority under the 15 year AFP Transformation Roadmap initiated during the Duterte administration, as it had been under the 2003-2016 PDR Program.

=== Professionalization ===
The AFP went through a number of changes during the 21 years under Ferdinand Marcos, notably in terms of the promotion of officers based on loyalty and connections to the president, and in terms of being given the task of implementing Martial Law, which led to officers being involved in human rights violations and in corruption. The years from 1965 to 1986 are thus considered to have marked a decline for AFP in terms of its traditional values of civilian supremacy and professionalism, leading to a need to actively professionalize the AFP. The 1990 Davide Commission and 2003 Feliciano Commission made recommendations towards the professionalization of the AFP as early as 1990 and 2003, respectively.

Under the Philippine Defense Reform (PDR) Program from 2003 to 2016, steps the AFP sought to take towards professionalization included the development of "Integrity Development Programs", programmatic efforts to improve the quality of service performance, continuing development programs for commanders and staff, and reforms in the recruitment of enlisted personnel. Alongside capability development, "professionalization of all ranks" is one of two strategic priorities identified by the 15 year AFP Transformation Roadmap which replaced the PDR Program during the Duterte administration.

=== Modernization ===
Republic Act No. 7898, approved by President Fidel V. Ramos on February 23, 1995, declared it the policy of the State to modernize the AFP to a level where it can effectively and fully perform its constitutional mandate to uphold the sovereignty and preserve the patrimony of the Republic of the Philippines, and mandated specific actions to be taken to achieve this end over a 15-year period ending in 2010. Republic Act No. 10349, approved by President Benigno Aquino III on December 11, 2012, amended RA7898 to establish a revised AFP modernization program lasting another 15 years ending in 2027. The act included new provisions for the acquisition of equipment for all the branches of AFP.

==== Philippine Defense Reform Program (2003–2016) ====
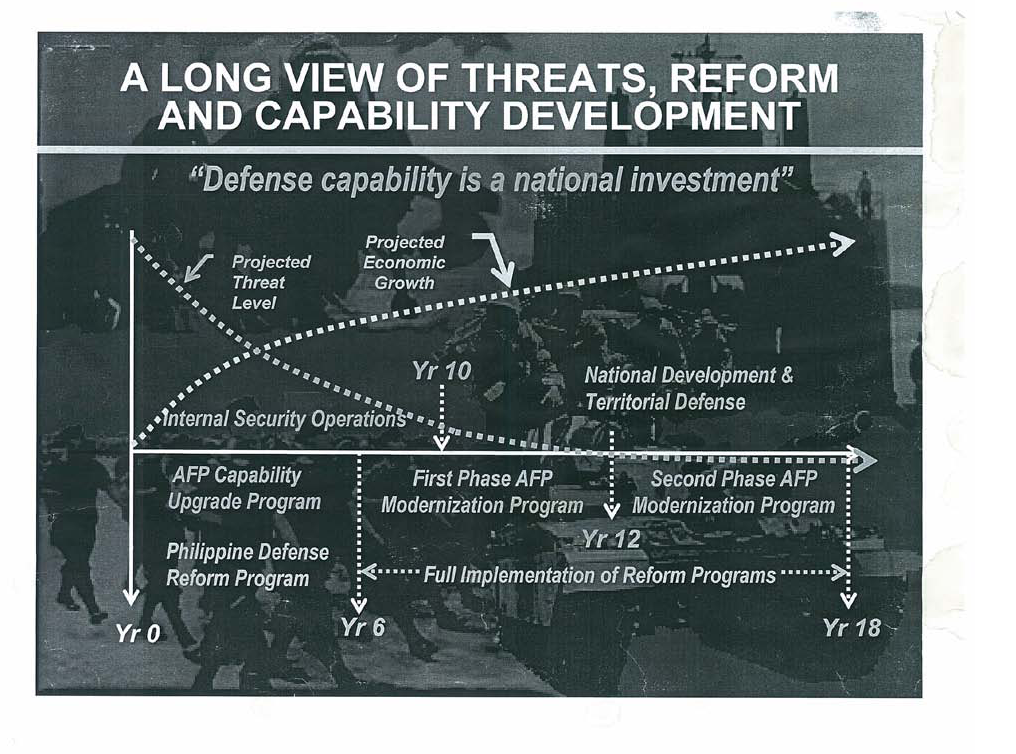
Framework of the Philippine Defense Reform Program

In October 1999, the Joint Defense Assessment (JDA) began as a policy level discussion between the Philippine Secretary of National Defense and the US Secretary of Defense. An initial JDA report in 2001 provided an objective evaluation of Philippine defense capability. During a May 2003 state visit to Washington DC, President Arroyo requested U.S. assistance in conducting a strategic assessment of the Philippine defense system. This led to a follow-up JDA and formulation of recommendations addressing deficiencies found in the Philippine defense structure.

The results of the 2003 JDA were devastating. The JDA findings revealed that the AFP was only partially capable of performing its most critical missions. Moreover, the results pointed overwhelmingly toward institutional and strategic deficiencies as being the root cause of most of the shortcomings. A common thread in all: the lack of strategy-based planning that would focus DND/AFP on addressing priority threats and link capability requirements with the acquisition process.

Specifically, the 2003 JDA revealed critical deficiencies in the following specific areas:

- Systemic approach to policy planning
- Personnel management and leadership
- Defense expenditures and budgeting
- Acquisition
- Supply and maintenance
- Quality assurance for existing industrial base
- Infrastructure support

During a reciprocal visit to the Philippines in October 2003 by U.S. President Bush, he and President Arroyo issued a joint statement expressing their commitment to embark upon a multi-year plan to implement the JDA recommendations. The Philippine Defense Reform (PDR) Program is the result of that agreement.

The JDA specifically identified 65 key areas and 207 ancillary areas of concern. These were reduced to ten broad-based and inter-related recommendations that later became the basis for what became known as the PDR Priority Programs. The ten are:

1. Multi-Year Defense Planning System (MYDPS)
2. Improve Intelligence, Operations, and Training Capacities
3. Improve Logistics Capacity
4. Professional Development Program
5. Improve Personnel Management System
6. Multi-year Capabilities Upgrade Program (CUP)
7. Optimization of Defense Budget and Improvement of Management Controls
8. Centrally Managed Defense Acquisition System Manned by a Professional Workforce
9. Development of Strategic Communication Capability
10. Information Management Development Program

From the perspective of the Philippine Department of National Defense (DND), the framework for reforms is based on an environment of increasing economic prowess and a gradually decreasing threat level over time, and seeks to make the following improvements: 1. Address AFP capability gaps to enable the AFP to effectively fulfill its mission. 2. Implement capability for seamless interoperability by developing proficiency in the conduct of joint operations, eliminating crisis handling by individual major services as done previously. 3. improve effectiveness of internal security operations. 4. Enhance capability to counter terrorism and other transnational threats. 5. Provide sustainment and/or long-term viability of acquired capabilities. 6. Improve cost-effectiveness of operations. 7. Improve accountability and transparency in the DND. 8. Increase professionalism in the AFP through reforms in areas such as promotions, assignments, and training. 9. Increase involvement of AFP in the peace process.

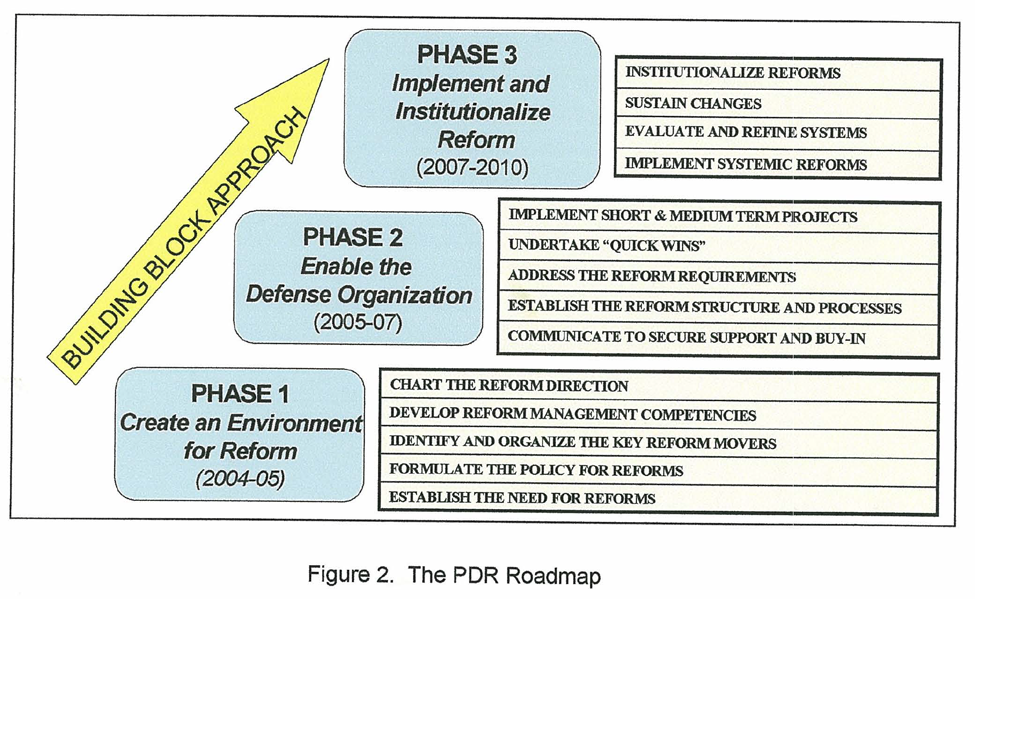
Steps of the Philippine Defense Reform Program

According to the goals stated in the Philippines Defense Reform Handbook: "The PDR serves as the overall framework to re-engineer our systems and re-tool our personnel." The Philippine Defense Reform follows a three-step implementation plan: 1. Creating the environment for reform (2004–2005); 2. Enabling the defense establishment (2005–2007); 3. Implementing and institutionalizing reform (2007–2010).

On September 23, 2003, President Arroyo issued Executive Order 240, streamlining procedures for defense contracts for the expeditious implementation of defense projects and the speedy response to security threats while promoting transparency, impartiality, and accountability in government transactions. Executive Order 240, creating the Office of the Undersecretary of Internal Control in the DND, mandated in part to institutionalize reforms in the procurement and fund disbursement systems in the AFP and the DND. On November 30, 2005, the Secretary of National Defense issued Department Order No. 82 (DO 82), creating the PDR Board and formalizing the reform organizational set-up between the DND and the AFP and defining workflow and decision-making processes.

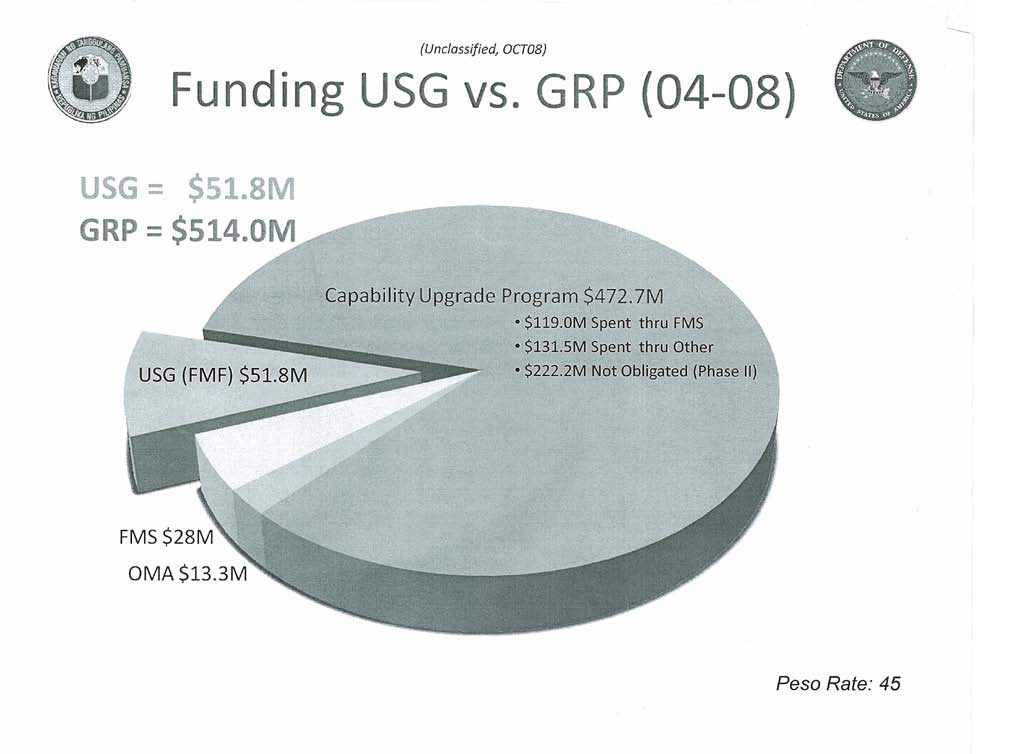
Funding of the Philippine Defense Reform Program

The PDR is jointly funded by the U.S. and R.P. governments. From 2004 to 2008, funding amounted to $51.8 million from the U.S. and $514.0 million from the RP. Initial planning assumptioned that the 18-year span of reform would encompass a period of steady rise in economic growth coupled with equally steady decline in the military threat from terrorists and separatists. Neither of these projections have proven accurate. As of 2010, at the six-year mark of PDR, the Philippine economy was internally strong, but suffering during a period of recession that crippled Philippine purchasing power. Worse, the threat situation in the Philippines had not improved significantly, or as in the case of the Sulu Archipelago, was deteriorating.

During the Arroyo presidency, deliberate 'Rolodexing' of senior leadership within the DND and AFP constantly put U.S. PDR advocates in a position of re-winning previously won points and positions, and gave U.S. observers a 'two steps forward, one step back' impression of the program. As of 2010, U.S. observers were uncertain whether Arroyo's successor, Benigno Aquino III, chosen in Philippine Presidential elections on May 10, 2010, will continue the tradition of rapid turnover of senior leadership.

U.S. observers have reported that overall progress of the PDR is unmistakable and has clearly struck a wider swath of the Philippine defense establishment than originally hoped. However, they see some troubling signs that the depth of the PDR's impact may not be as significant as originally desired. For example, the Philippine legislature continues to significantly underfund the DND and AFP, currently at 9 percent of GDP, compared to an average of 2 percent worldwide, and a 4 percent outlay by the U.S. Even with full implementation of all the PDR's programs and recommendations, the defense establishment would not be able to sustain itself at current funding levels. While this can be made up by future outlays, as of 2010 observers see no outward sign the legislature is planning to do so. One U.S. observer likened PDR process to the progress of a Jeepney on a busy Manila avenue—explaining, "a Jeepney moves at its own pace, stops unexpectedly, frequently changes passengers, moves inexplicably and abruptly right and left in traffic, but eventually arrives safely." President Aquino has promised to implement the PDR program. As of 9 March 2011, a major Philippine news organization tracking performance on his promises evaluated that one as "To Be Determined."

The Mutual Defense Treaty between the Philippines and the United States has not been updated since its signing in 1951. As of 2013, discussions were underway for a formal U.S.-Philippine Framework Agreement detail how U.S. forces would be able to "operate on Philippine military bases and in Philippine territorial waters to help build Philippine military capacity in maritime security and maritime domain awareness." In particular, this Framework Agreement would which would increase rotational presence of American forces in the Philippines.

Longstanding treaties, such as the aforementioned 1951 Mutual Defense Treaty and the United Nations Convention on the Law of the Sea (UNCLOS) of 1982, are of great importance to the Philippines in supporting maritime security in particular; respectively, their legally binding nature provides long-term effectiveness for mutual defense cooperation and for the development of the Philippine maritime and archipelagic domain.

Philippine defense operations are supported in part through U.S. Section 1206 ($102.3 million) and 1207 ($16.02 million) funds. These funds are aimed at carrying out security, counterterrorism training and rule of law programs. Overall, the United States is increasing U.S. funding for military education and training programs in Southeast Asia. The most recent U.S. Department of Defense budget for the region includes $90 million for programs, which is a 50 percent increased from four years ago.

Defense Secretary Voltaire T. Gazmin formally ended the PDR Program on June 23, 2016, because the upcoming administration of Rodrigo Duterte, which would begin its term later that month, had indicated that it wanted to set its own direction for the running of Philippine defense matters.

==== Philippine Space Force ====
In July 2026, the AFP has publicly disclosed it began planning the establishment of a Space Center by 2028 which will enable the AFP to develop military satellite capability. It part of a long-term plan to establish a Space Command or Space Force.

=== Fixed Term for key officials ===
On May 16, 2022, the Malacañang Palace announced that the President Rodrigo Duterte has signed a law, known as Republic Act no. 11709, that enables a three-year fixed term for key officials of the Armed Forces of the Philippines, such as Chief of Staff of the Armed Forces of the Philippines, the Vice Chief of Staff of the Armed Forces of the Philippines, the Deputy Chief of Staff of the Armed Forces of the Philippines, the Commanding General of the Philippine Army, the Commanding General of the Philippine Air Force, the Flag Officer-in-Command of the Philippine Navy, The Inspector General, and for the respective commanders of the Unified Commands. Meanwhile, junior officers ranging from the ranks of second lieutenant/ensign to colonel/captain, as well as enlisted personnel, will be compulsorily retired upon reaching the age of 56 or served a maximum of 30 years of active service, while flag officers who reached the rank of brigadier general/commodore to lieutenant general/vice admiral will have a retirement age of 59, unless named as a commander of the service branch or unified command, as defined in the law. Under the new law, members who will be appointed in the Corps of Professors will be retired upon reaching the age of 60 or the completion of 20 years of active duty, while the Superintendent of the Philippine Military Academy will have a four-year term, and will not be eligible to be placed in a higher position, such as the Chief of Staff, and shall be retired upon reaching the end of their term. The law also enables the President of the Philippines to terminate their respective roles before the expiration of their fixed term, and has the powers to extend the term of the Chief of Staff in times of war, or national emergency matters, with the consent of the Congress of the Philippines. The new law aims to increase the AFP's organizational professionalism and stability in within the institution, and will further enhance the AFP's efficiency, preparedness and effectiveness to the AFP's mandate. The law also aims to lessen the effects of the "revolving door" policy and eliminating short-term duties for the commanders within the ranks.

However, the new law encountered many problems within the AFP's organization, which caused some middle ranking officers to raise their concerns regarding the promotions of younger officers within the hierarchy, while addressing concerns for the possible reduction of promoted officers within the ranks of lieutenant colonel to colonel/ lieutenant commander to commander due to reduced tenure limits, and allaying fears of lowering a merit-based promotion system. Additionally, another hurdles also hounded the higher ranks, due to the fixed tenures of various officers, and on the appointment of Bartolome Vicente Bacarro as the AFP Chief of Staff, where in an editorial made by then-AFP Spokesman retired Major General Edgard Arevalo in The Manila Times named "The fates of two AFP chiefs of staff", where Bacarro's appointment as AFP Chief was made months prior of General Andres Centino's mandatory retirement age, in which makes Centino's position as the only four star officer in the AFP is still higher than Bacarro's, which prevented Bacarro to be promoted to the next rank. The problems regarding the new law caused rumblings in the AFP's organization, which was also admitted by then DND Officer-in-Charge Carlito Galvez Jr.. After months of deliberations, a new law was made in order to fix the problems caused by Republic Act no. 11709, and on May 17, 2023, the Republic Act no. 11939 was signed by President Bongbong Marcos, which reduced number of officials of having fixed terms to only five, namely the Chief of Staff of the Armed Forces of the Philippines, which will have a maximum of a three-year tenure. Four other high-ranking officers will also have a maximum of a two-year tenure, which consists of the Commanding General of the Philippine Army, the Commanding General of the Philippine Air Force, the Flag Officer-in-Command of the Philippine Navy, and the Superintendent of the Philippine Military Academy. The newly revised law also maintained the powers of the President of the Philippines to terminate their terms at his/her pleasure. On January 7, 2023, General Andres Centino was reappointed as AFP Chief of Staff, replacing Lieutenant General Bartolome Vicente Bacarro, which made Centino the only AFP Chief to be appointed in the same office twice, from November 12, 2021, to August 8, 2022, and on January 6, 2023, to July 19, 2023, and is the only AFP Chief to be appointed in the post by two Presidents.

== National policies ==
Recent national policies have shifted the strategic direction of the AFP towards external, territorial defense as opposed to previous, internal foci. Some of the challenges with this change in strategic direction include the uneven distribution of maritime security resources among territorial, transnational, environmental, and humanitarian assistance and disaster response (HADR) conflicts. For example, Philippine Executive Order 57, signed in 2011 by President Benigno Aquino III, established a central inter-agency mechanism for enhancing governance in the country's maritime domain. Between 1995 and 2019, the AFP Reserve Manpower in the Philippines totaled 741,937 and 4,384,936 ROTC Cadets. Out of the 700,00+ reservists; 93,062 are (ready reserve) and 610,586 are (standby reserve). There are a total of 20,451 with the affiliated reserve units.

Conflicts over responsibility for maritime surveillance between armed forces continue to underscore the numerous challenges that the TBA faces. For example, following the expulsion of Ferdinand Marcos from the Philippines in 1986, the Philippine Coast Guard separated from the Philippine Navy, resulting in an uneven distribution of resources and jurisdictional confusion.

== Recognition and achievements ==
Throughout the years, the AFP received numerous recognitions and commendation within the local sectors, the national government and in the international community. One example is the Philippine Army shooting team, wherein the unit was the overall champion in a two-week competition held in Australia, in 2013. The Philippine Army shooting team won 14 gold medals, 50 silver medals and two bronze medals in Australian Army Skills at the Arms Meeting (AASAM) in 2014.

The 7th Philippine Contingent peacekeepers to the Golan Heights were awarded the prestigious United Nations Service Medal for the performance of their mission.

== Ranks ==
The officer ranks are as follows:

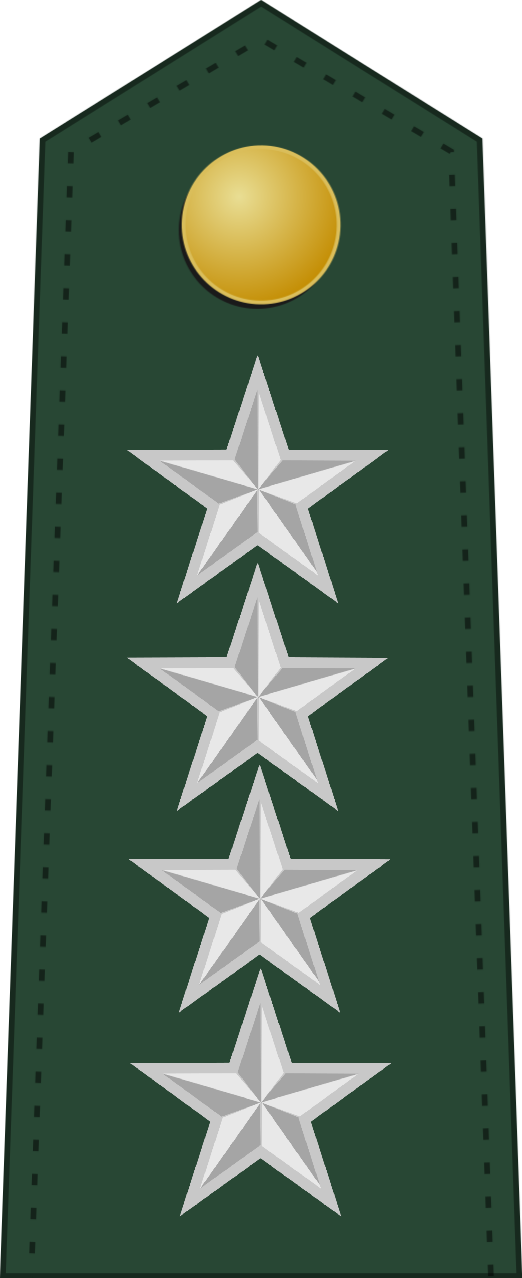
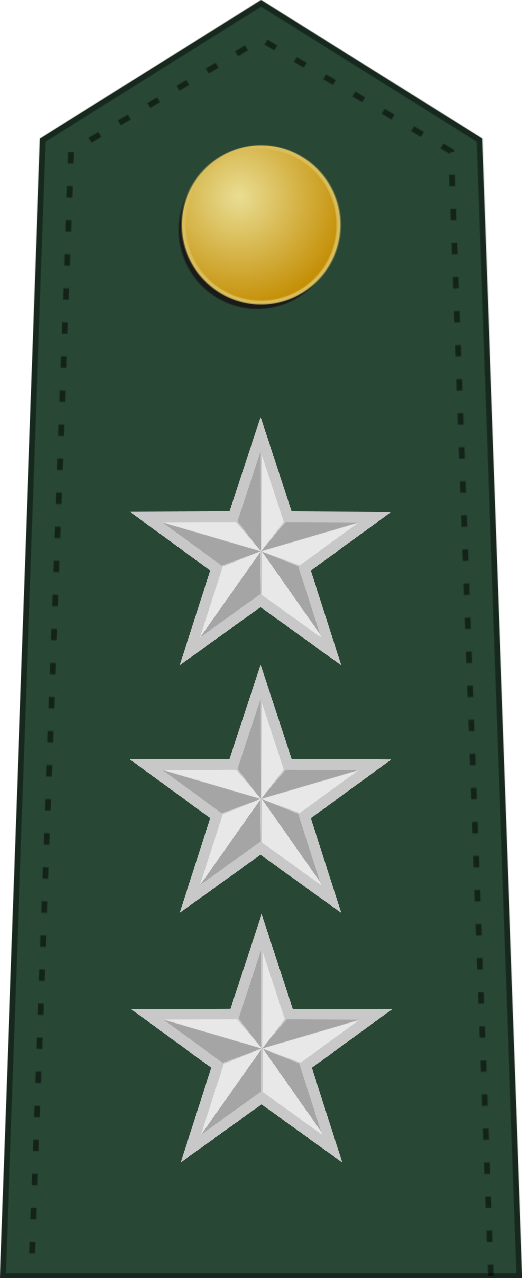
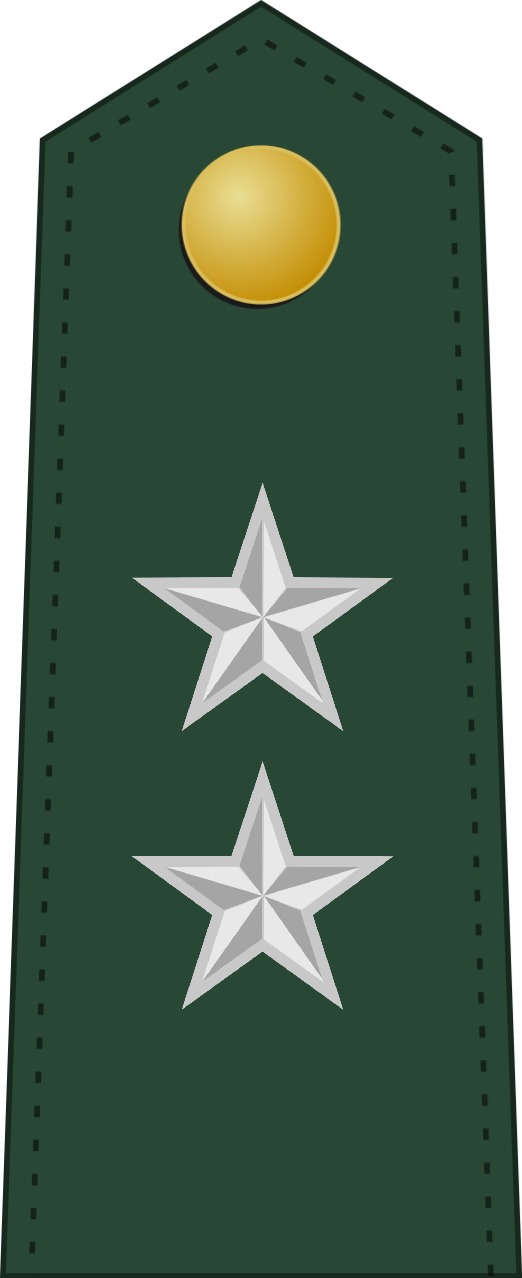
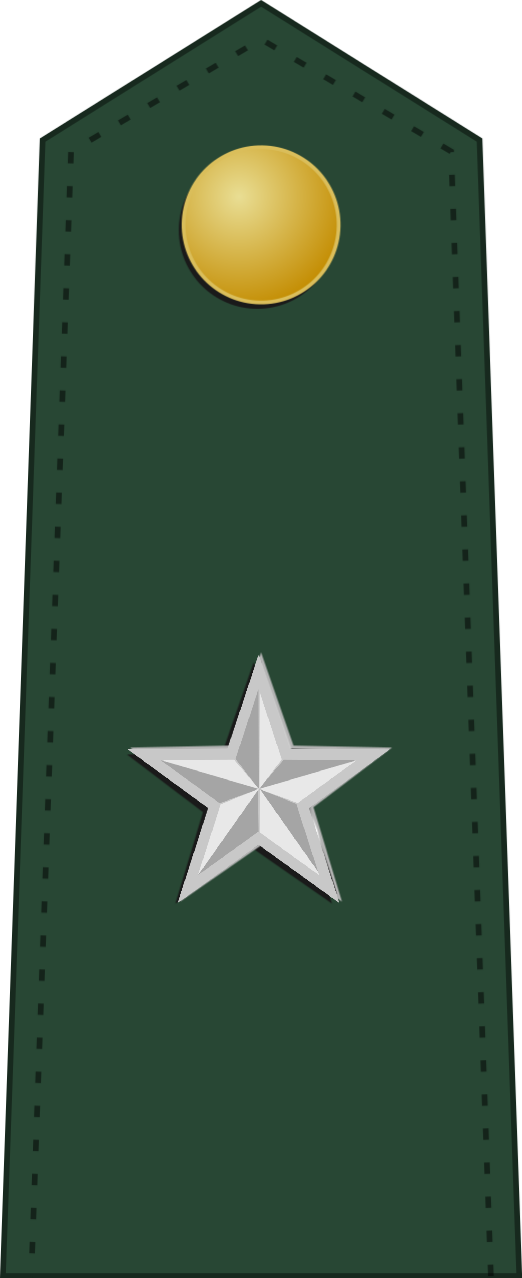
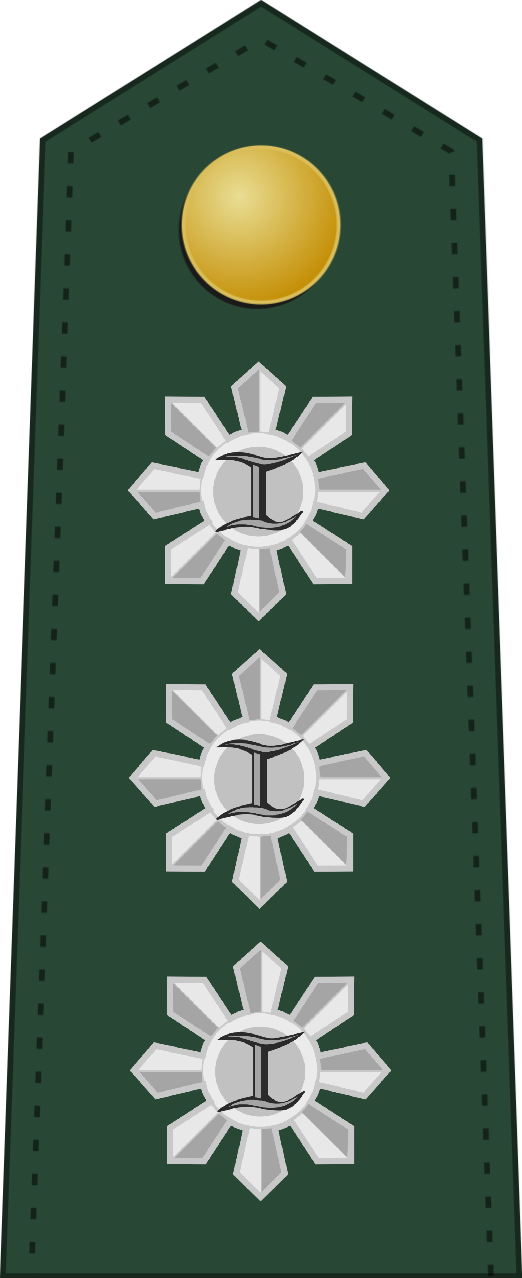
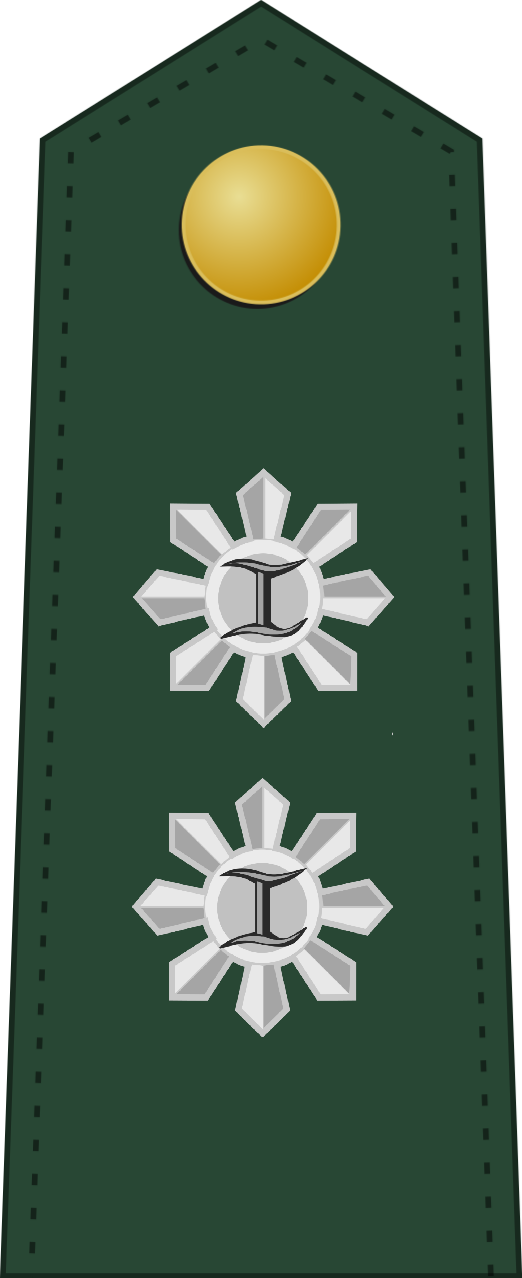
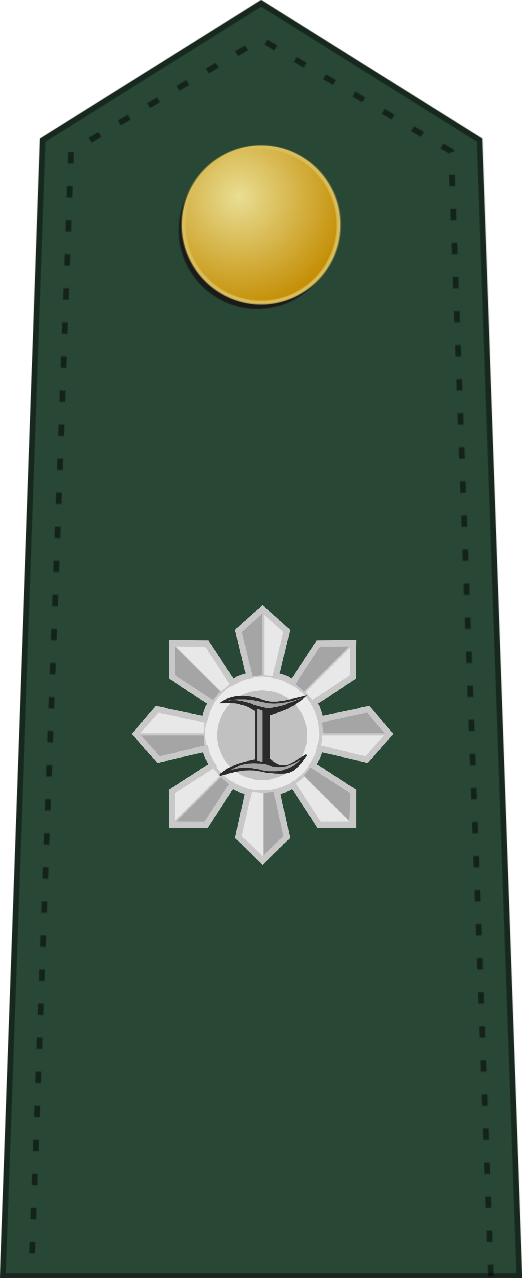
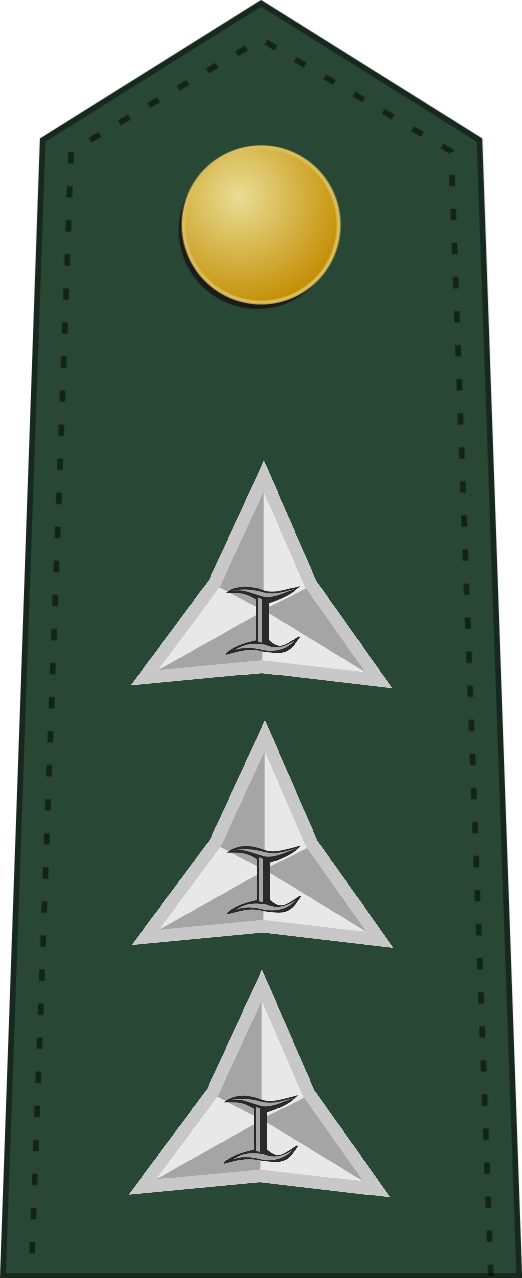
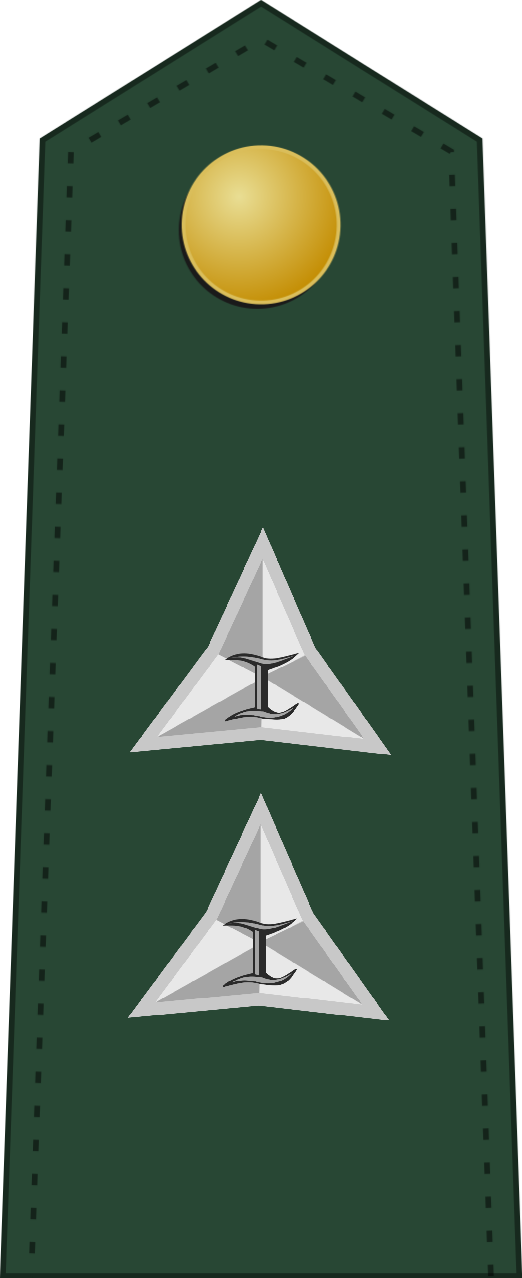
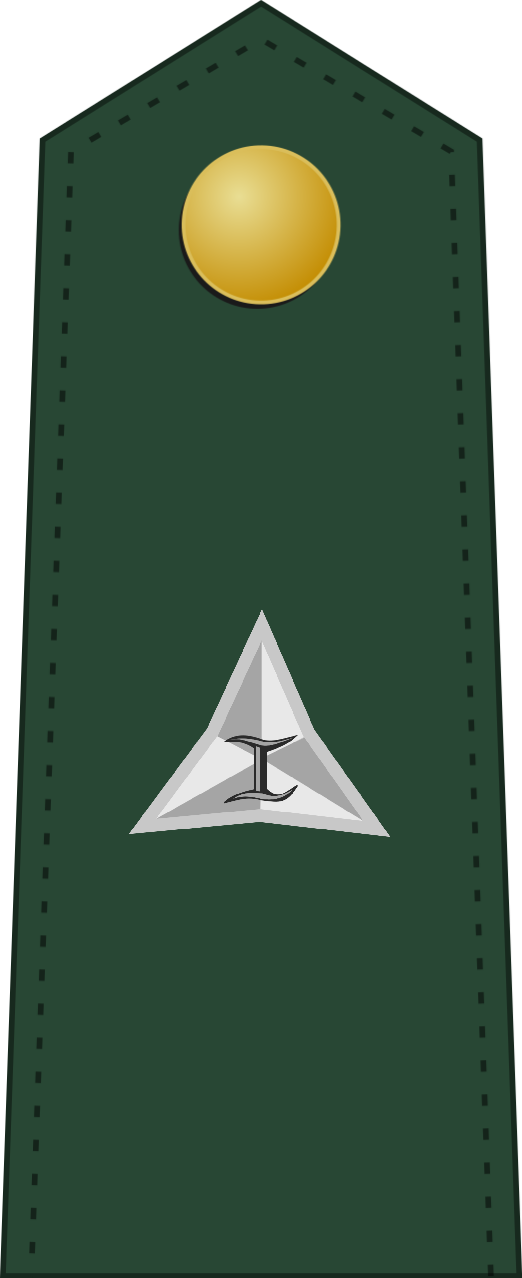
Rank group	General / flag officers				Senior officers			Junior officers
Philippine Army
Philippine Army	General	Lieutenant general	Major general	Brigadier general	Colonel	Lieutenant Colonel	Major	Captain	First lieutenant	Second lieutenant
Philippine Navy
Philippine Navy	Admiral	Vice admiral	Rear admiral	Commodore	Captain	Commander	Lieutenant commander	Lieutenant	Lieutenant junior grade	Ensign
Philippine Air Force
Philippine Air Force	General	Lieutenant general	Major general	Brigadier general	Colonel	Lieutenant colonel	Major	Captain	First lieutenant	Second lieutenant
Rank group	General / flag officers				Senior officers			Junior officers

These ranks, heavily inspired by those of the United States Armed Forces, are officially used in the Philippine Army, Air Force and Marine Corps. The ranks are more frequently referred and addressed in English rather than in Spanish or Tagalog/Filipino, since English is the working language within the Armed Forces.

The ranks in the Philippine Navy are similar to the US Navy ranks, the only difference is the rank of Commodore in the Philippine Navy is equivalent to the Lower Half Rear Admiral of the US Navy.

The alternative style of address for the ranks of lieutenant junior grade Lt(jg), lieutenant (Lt), second lieutenant, and first lieutenant are simply lieutenant in English, or tenyente or teniente in Tagalog and Spanish, respectively.

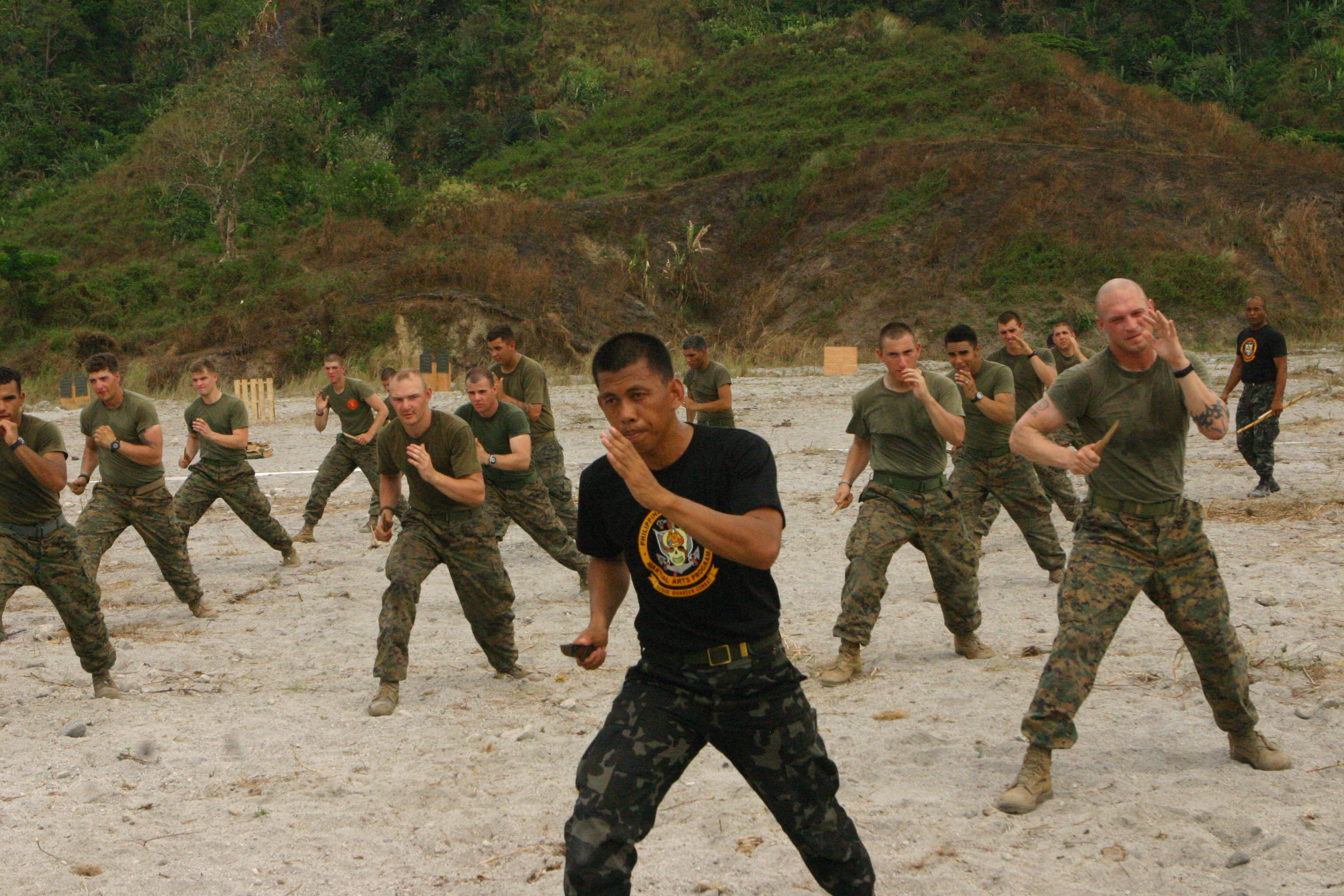
A Philippine Marine Corps instructor teaches US Marines "Pekiti-Tirsia Kali", a Philippine martial art, during military exercises

The ranks of enlisted personnel in Filipino are the same as their U.S. counterparts, with some differences. Except in the Marine Corps, never used are the ranks of specialist, sergeant first class, and first sergeant. Lance corporal, gunnery sergeant, and master gunnery sergeant are also never used by the Philippine Marine Corps, whose ranks are the same as the Army's. Additionally, sergeant majors in the AFP are only appointments for senior ranked non-commissioned officers (NCOs) rather than ranks, examples of such appointments being the Command Sergeant Major, AFP (held by a first chief master sergeant or a first master chief petty officer) and the Command Master Chief Petty Officer, Philippine Navy (held by an either MCPO or CMS or a SCPO or SMS).

In the Philippine Navy, they also use enlisted ranks which come from the U.S. Navy with their specialization, e.g. "Master Chief and Boatswain's mate Juan Dela Cruz, PN" (Philippine Navy).

In effect, the AFP uses the pre-1955 US military enlisted ranks, with several changes, especially in the Navy and in the senior NCO ranks.

There are no warrant officers in between officer ranks and enlisted ranks.

The uniqueness of Philippine military ranks can be seen in the current highest ranks of first chief master sergeant (for the Army, Marine Corps and Air Force) and first master chief petty officer (for the Navy), both created in 2004, and since then have become the highest enlisted rank of precedence. Prior, first chief sergeant and master chief petty officer were the highest enlisted ranks and rates, the former being the highest rank of precedence for Army, Air Force and Marine NCOs. Today only the rank of first master chief petty officer is unused, but the rank of first chief master sergeant is now being applied.

=== Five-star rank ===
President Ferdinand Marcos, who acted also as national defense secretary (from 1965 to 1967 and 1971 to 1972), issued an order conferring the five-star officer rank to the President of the Philippines, making himself as its first rank holder. Since then, the rank of five-star general/admiral became an honorary rank of the commander-in-chief of the armed forces whenever a new president assumes office for a six-year term, thus making the President the most senior military official.

The only career military officer who reached the rank of five-star general/admiral de jure was President Fidel V. Ramos (USMA 1950) (president from 1992 to 1998) who rose from second lieutenant up to commander-in-chief of the armed forces.

General of the Army Douglas MacArthur was also made Field Marshal of the Philippine Army with five-star rank in 1938, the only person to hold that rank. Emilio Aguinaldo, the first President of the Philippines, holds an equivalent of five-star general under the title Generalissimo and Minister/Field Marshal as the first commander-in-chief of the AFP.

The position is honorary and may be granted to any military officer, especially generals or admirals who had significant contributions and showed heroism, only in times of war and national defense concerns and emergencies. The highest peacetime rank is that of four-star general which is being held only by the AFP Chief of Staff. However, no law specifically establishes the rank of five-star general in the Armed Forces of the Philippines unlike in the United States and other countries.

=== Rank insignia ===
The AFP, like the military forces of Singapore and Indonesia, uses unitary rank insignia for enlisted personnel in the Philippine Army, in the form of raised chevrons increasing by seniority. The same principle applies to the EPs of the Philippine Air Force which, this time, uses inverted chevrons from Airman 2nd Class onward.

In the Philippine Navy, these are supplemented by rating insignia by specialty, similar to their American counterparts. Like the British and Spanish armed services, however, senior ranked naval NCOs (from pay grade E-7 onwards) also wear shoulder rank insignia only on the mess, semi-dress and dress uniforms, and in some cases even collar insignia. Like the US Navy, all NCOs wear sleeve stripes to denote years of service in the enlisted ranks. Sleeve insignia for enlisted personnel in the Army and the Navy are similar but are different from those used in the US, while those in the Philippine Marine Corps mirror its US counterpart but with special symbols from Master Sergeants (E-7) onward (adopted in the early 2000s).

Officer ranks in the AFP are inspired by insignia used by the Philippine Revolutionary Army after the 1898 Declaration of Independence. These are unitary rank insignia used in the General Office Attire (GOA), both on shoulders (Army, and Air Force) and collars (Navy and Marine Corps). Lieutenants and Captains (O-1 to O-3) wear 1 to 3 triangles (and Navy Ensigns and Lieutenants (junior and senior grades) in their working, duty and combat uniforms) while Majors, Lieutenant Colonels and Colonels (O-4 to O-6) wear 1 to 3 suns. Both triangles and suns have the ancient baybayin letter ka (K) in the center, symbolizing for Kalayaan ("Freedom"), and reflecting their lineage with their Katipunan, and Revolutionary Army forefathers during the Revolution of 1896.

Same insignias are worn on the chest as simplified 1in x 2.5in embroidered patches in their respective Battle Dress Uniform (BDU), namely:

- Philippine Army Pattern (PHILARPAT) Battle Dress Uniform; also known as the One AFP BDU when used by other branches
- Sailor's Battle Dress Uniform (SBDU)
- Pixelated Battle Dress Uniform (PBDU); colloquially referred to as the Philippine Marine Pattern Uniform/PHILMARPAT
- Philippine Air Force Pattern (PhilAirPat) Battle Dress Uniform; colloquially referred to as BDU Grey

The Navy wear their rank insignias differently from the other branches: they wear their shoulder boards for their semi-dress, dress, and mess uniforms in the very same format as their American counterparts, except the star is replaced by an eight-rayed sun. Flag officers (from Commodore to Admiral) wear gold shoulder boards with their rank insignia, and the sealion device found in the seal of the Philippine Navy.

For dress blue uniforms, the Navy only utilizes sleeve insignias, akin to their American counterparts.

== Gallery ==
Armed Forces of the Philippines

Philippine Marines praying before military operations during the 2000 Philippine campaign against the Moro Islamic Liberation Front

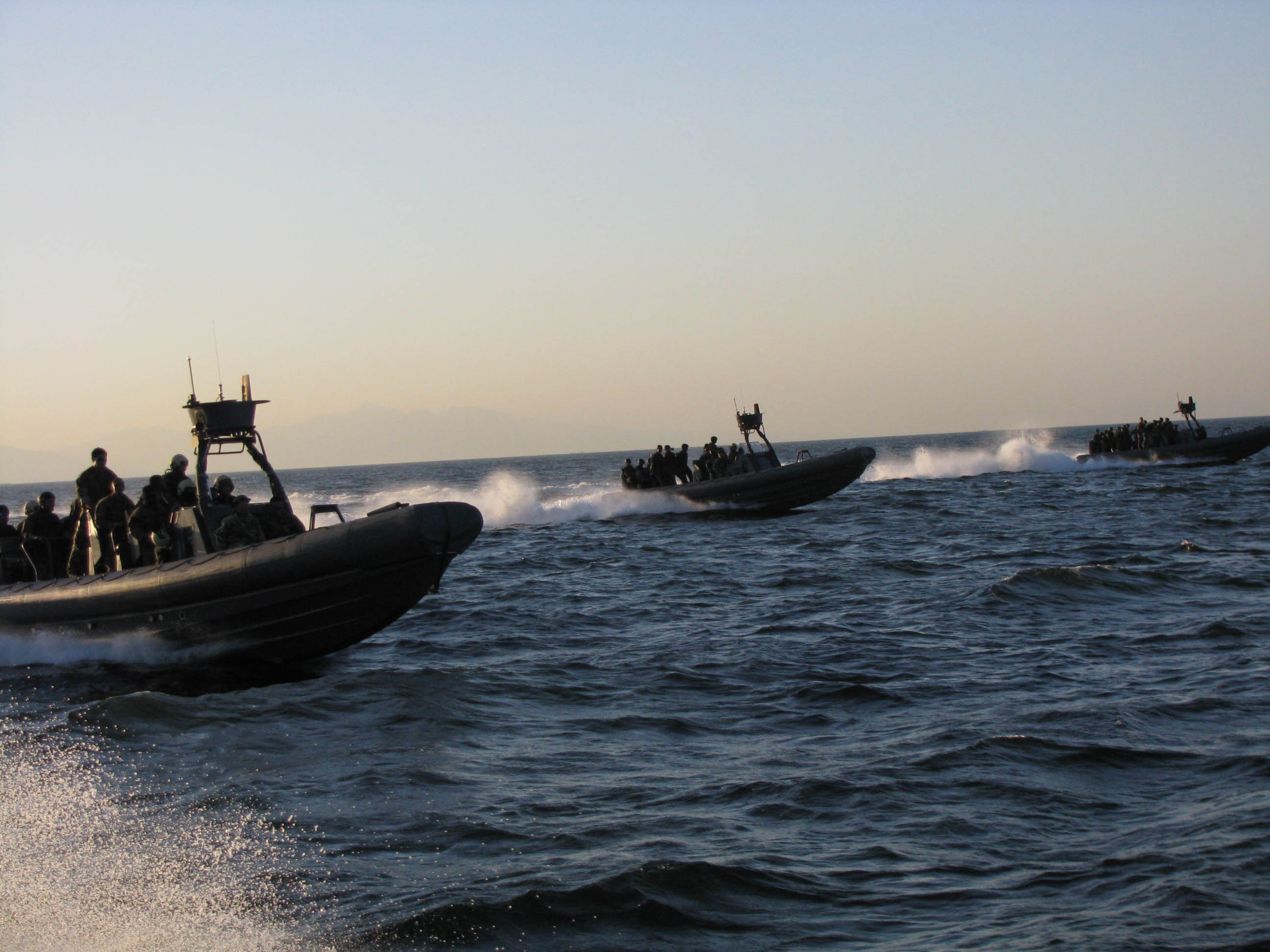
Philippine Navy rigid hull inflatable boats perform a maritime interdiction operation exercise in Manila Bay.

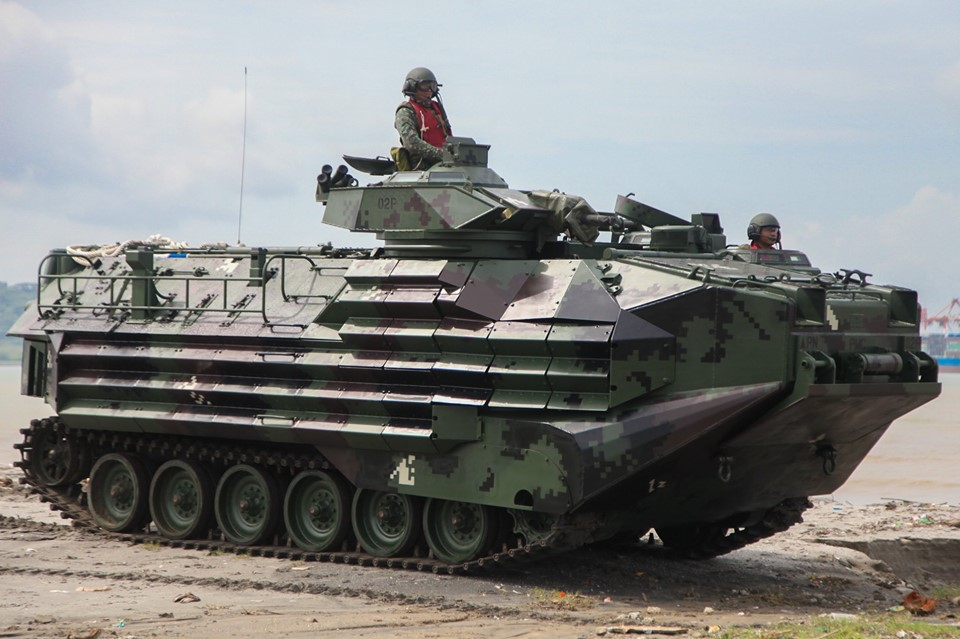
Philippine Marine Corps' KAAV7A1 during DAGIT-PA 03-19 exercises

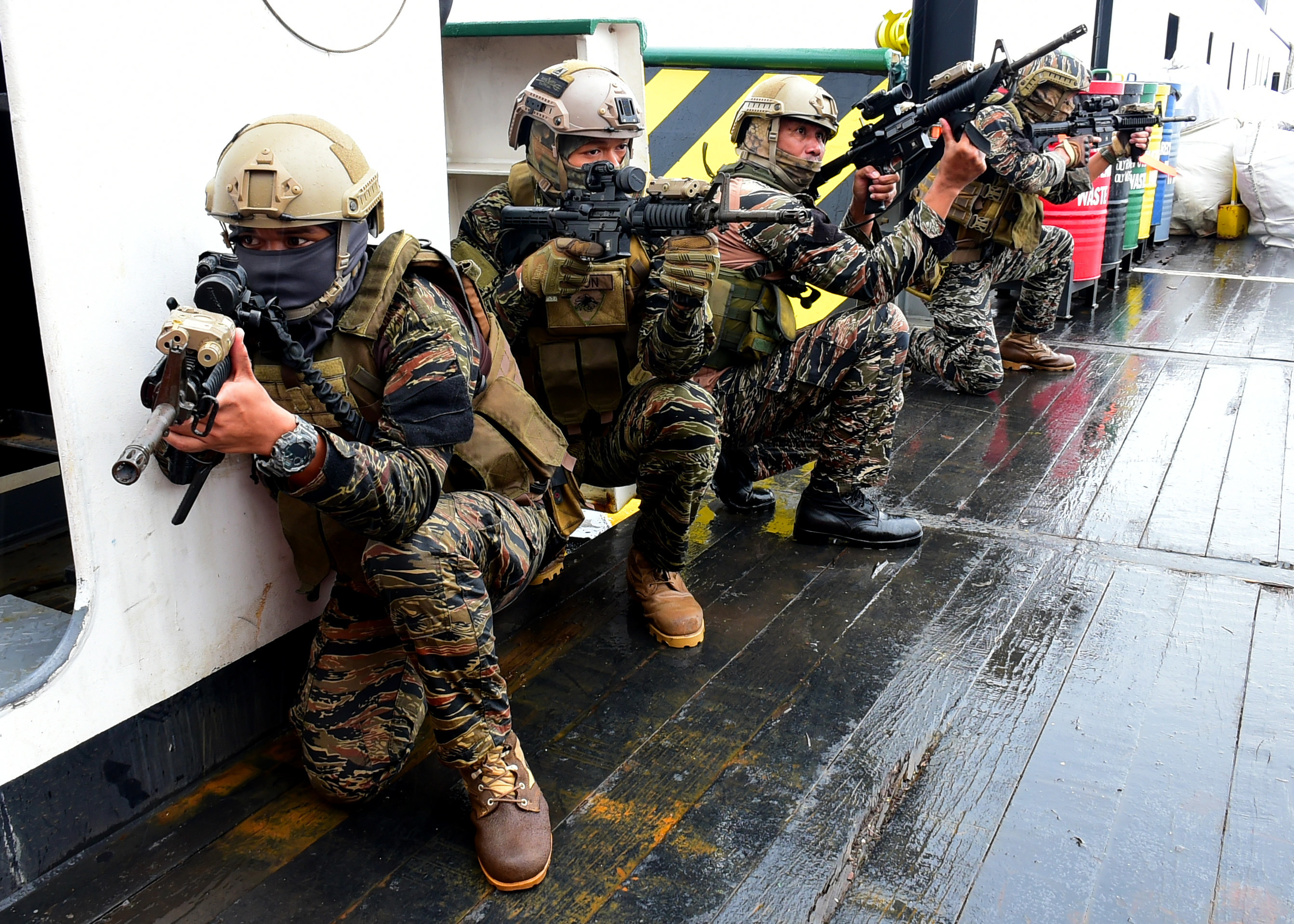
NAVSOCOM at the SEACAT 2018 Exercise 002

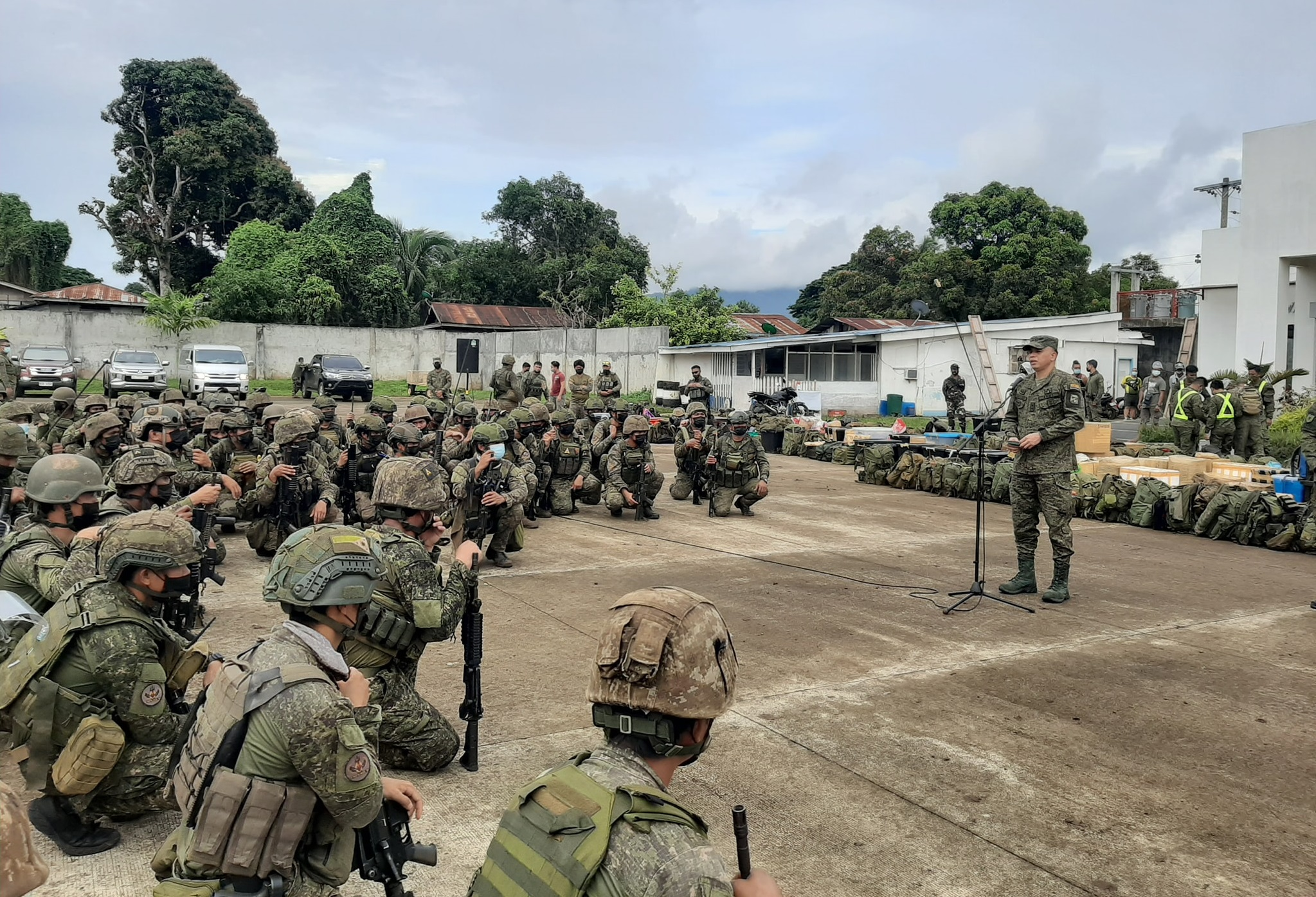
Soldiers of the Philippine Army 11th "Alakdan" Infantry Division

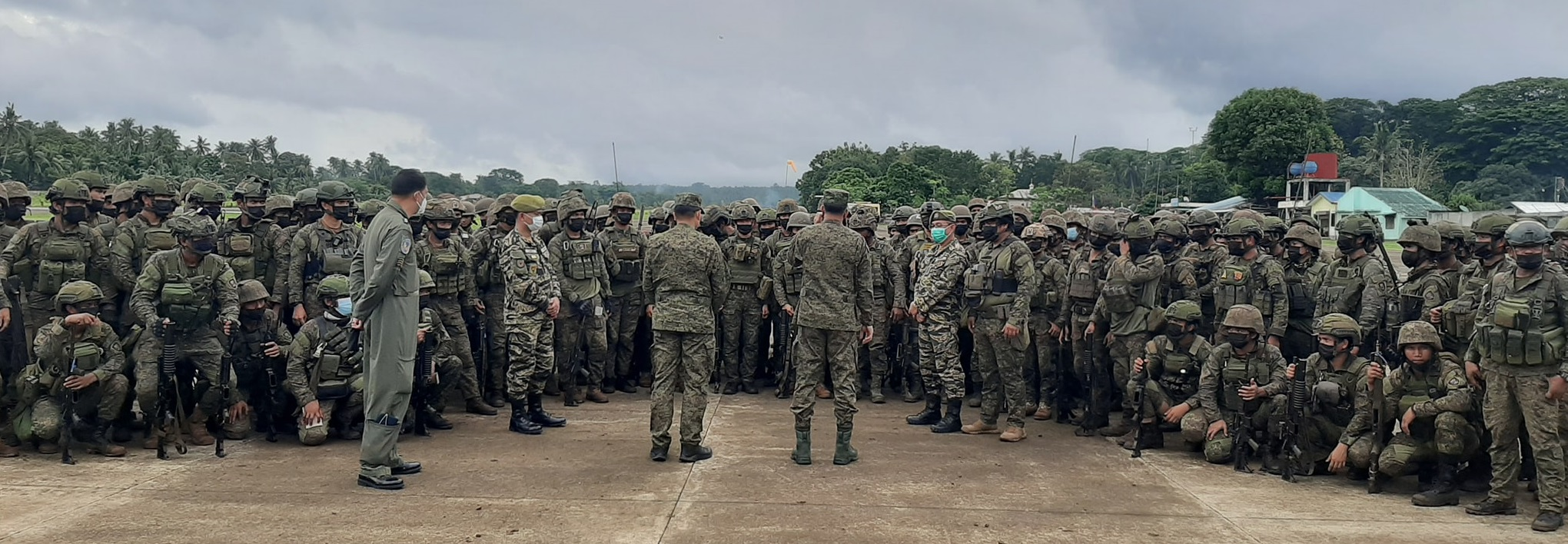
Sulu Commander Major General William N Gonzales extended his appreciation to the soldiers of the Philippine Army 11th Infantry Division and Joint Task Force

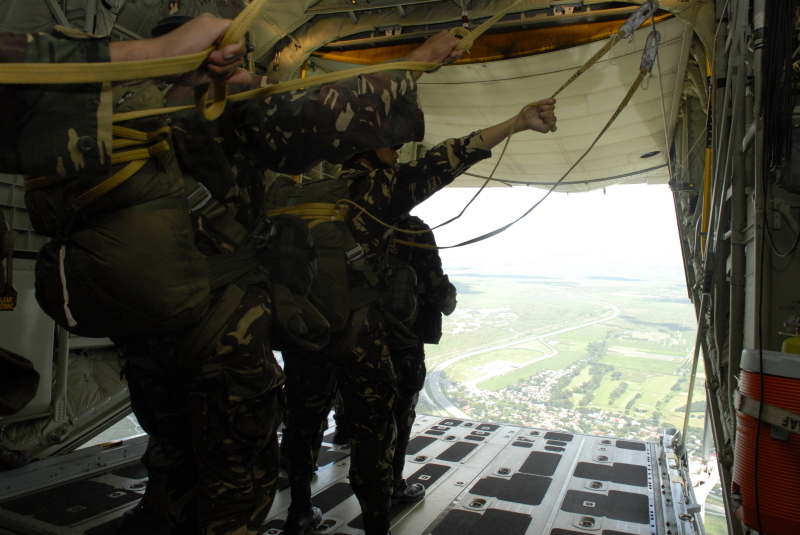
Airmen of the 710th Special Operations Wing prepare to jump from a KC-130 during Parachute Operations training.

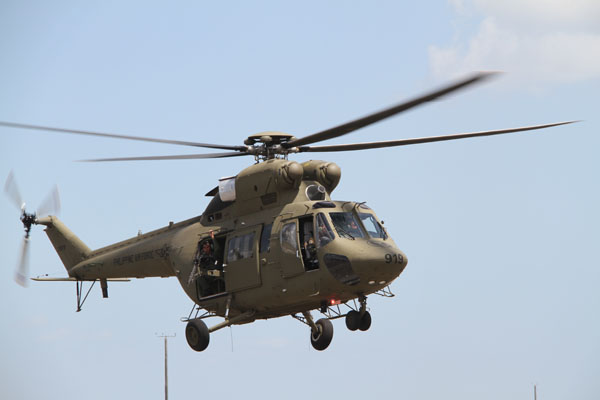
Philippine Air Force W-3A Sokol in combat helicopter paint scheme before transferring to search and rescue role.

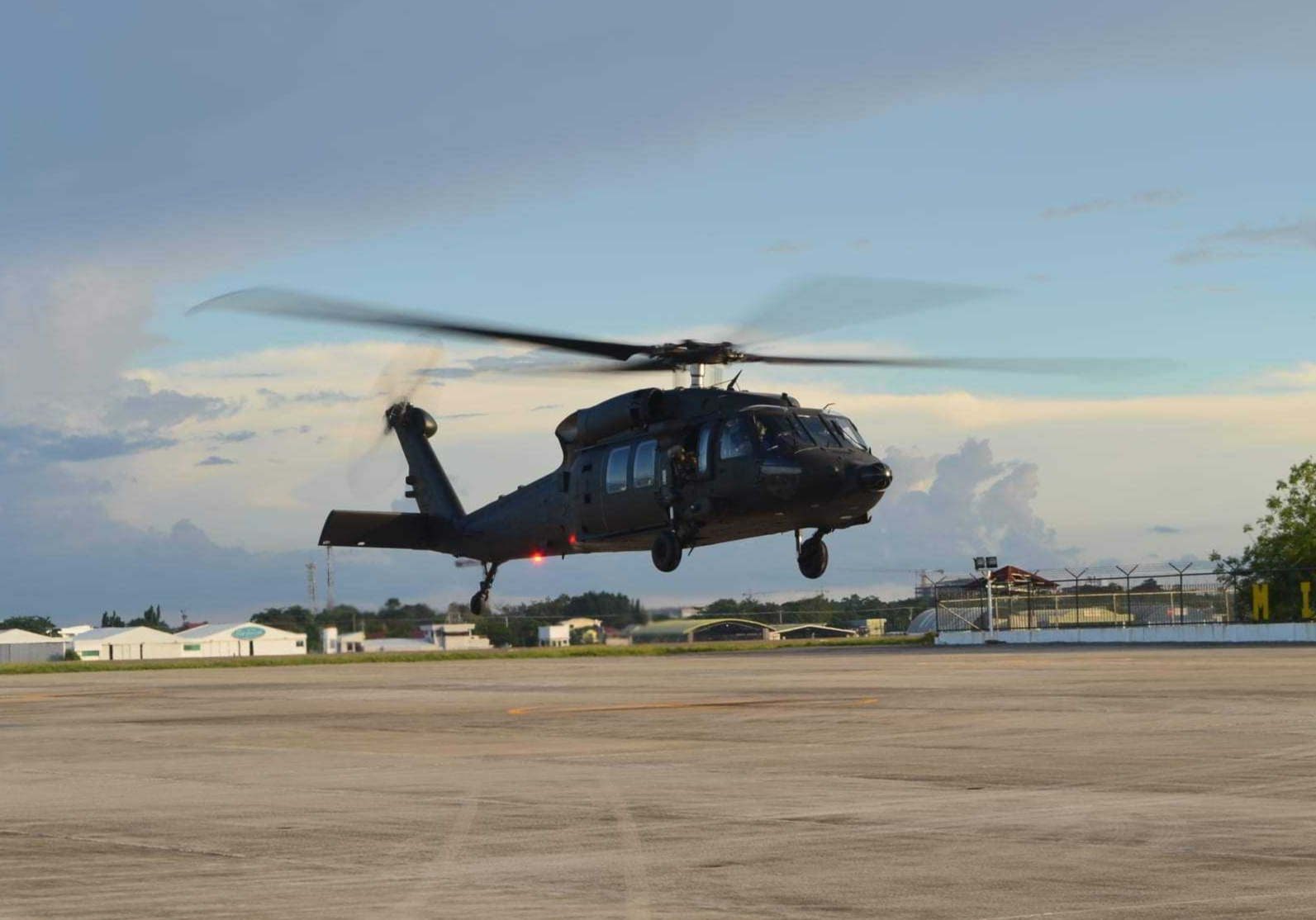
Philippine Air Force S-70i Black Hawk

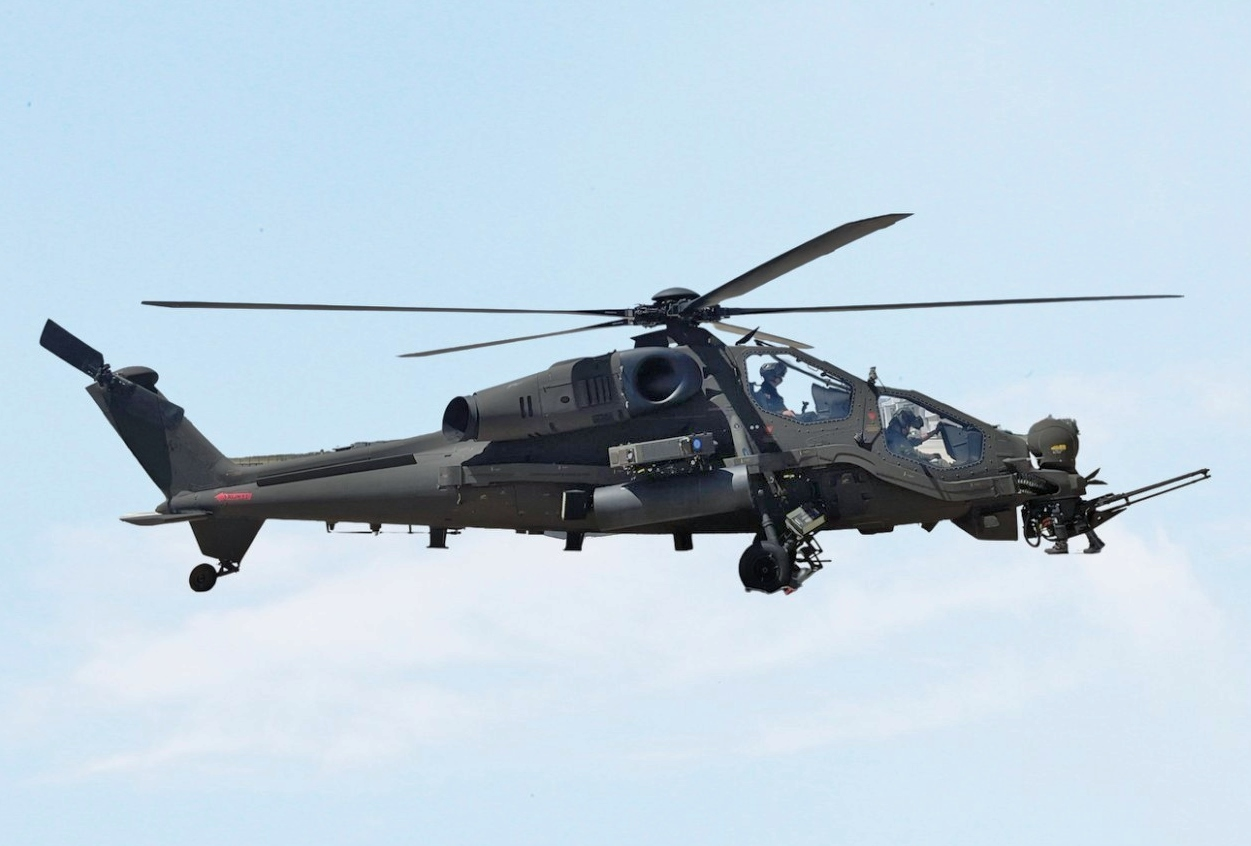
Philippine Air Force T129B ATAK

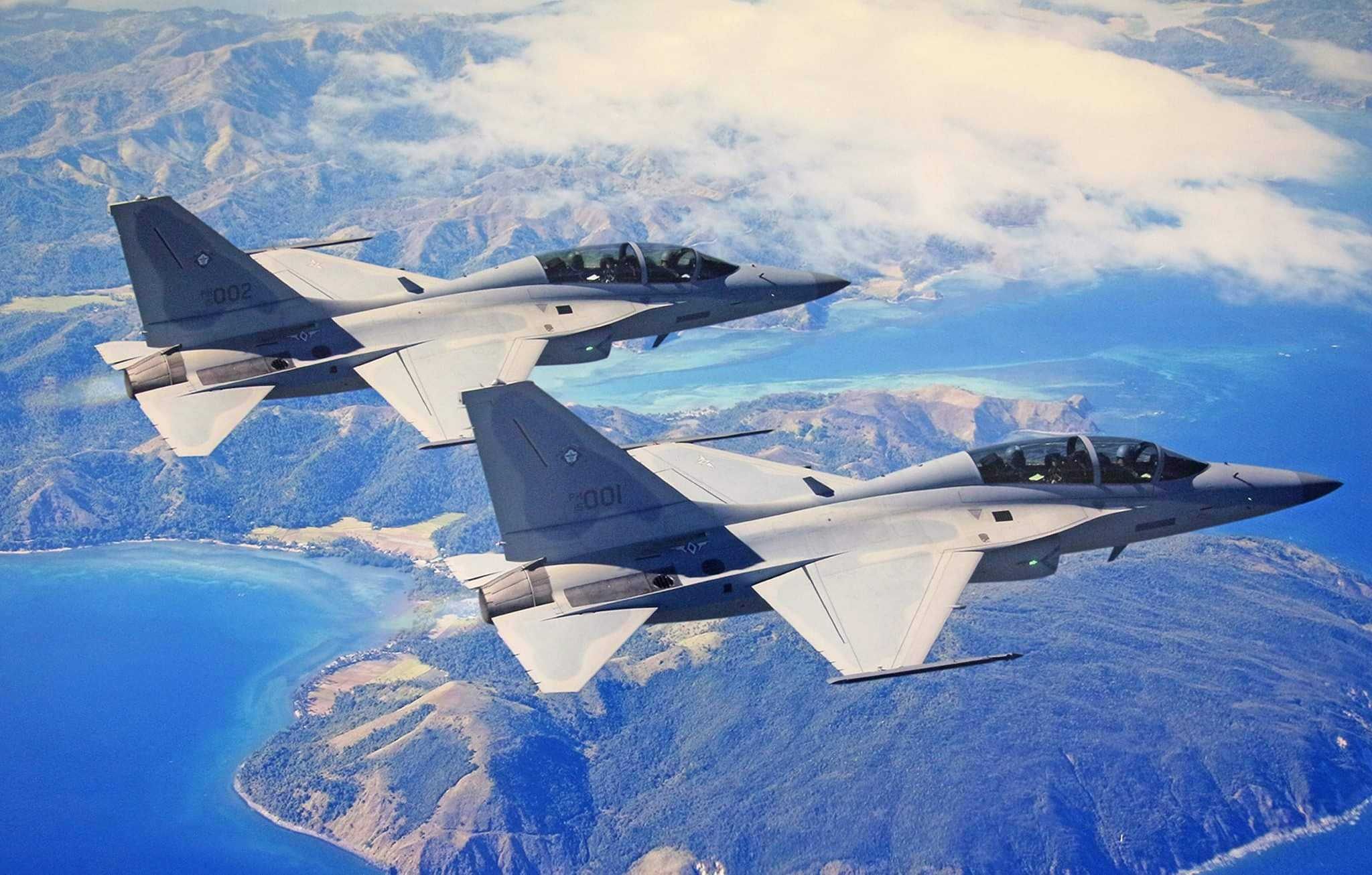
Two PAF's FA-50PH fighter jets

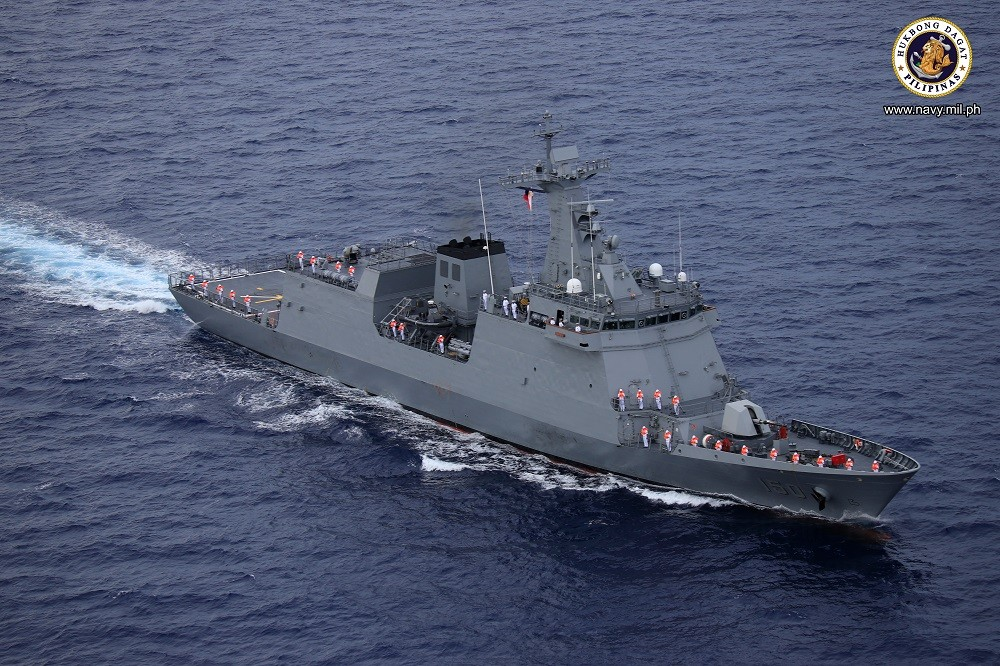
The BRP Jose Rizal, the first purpose-built vessel of the Philippine Navy

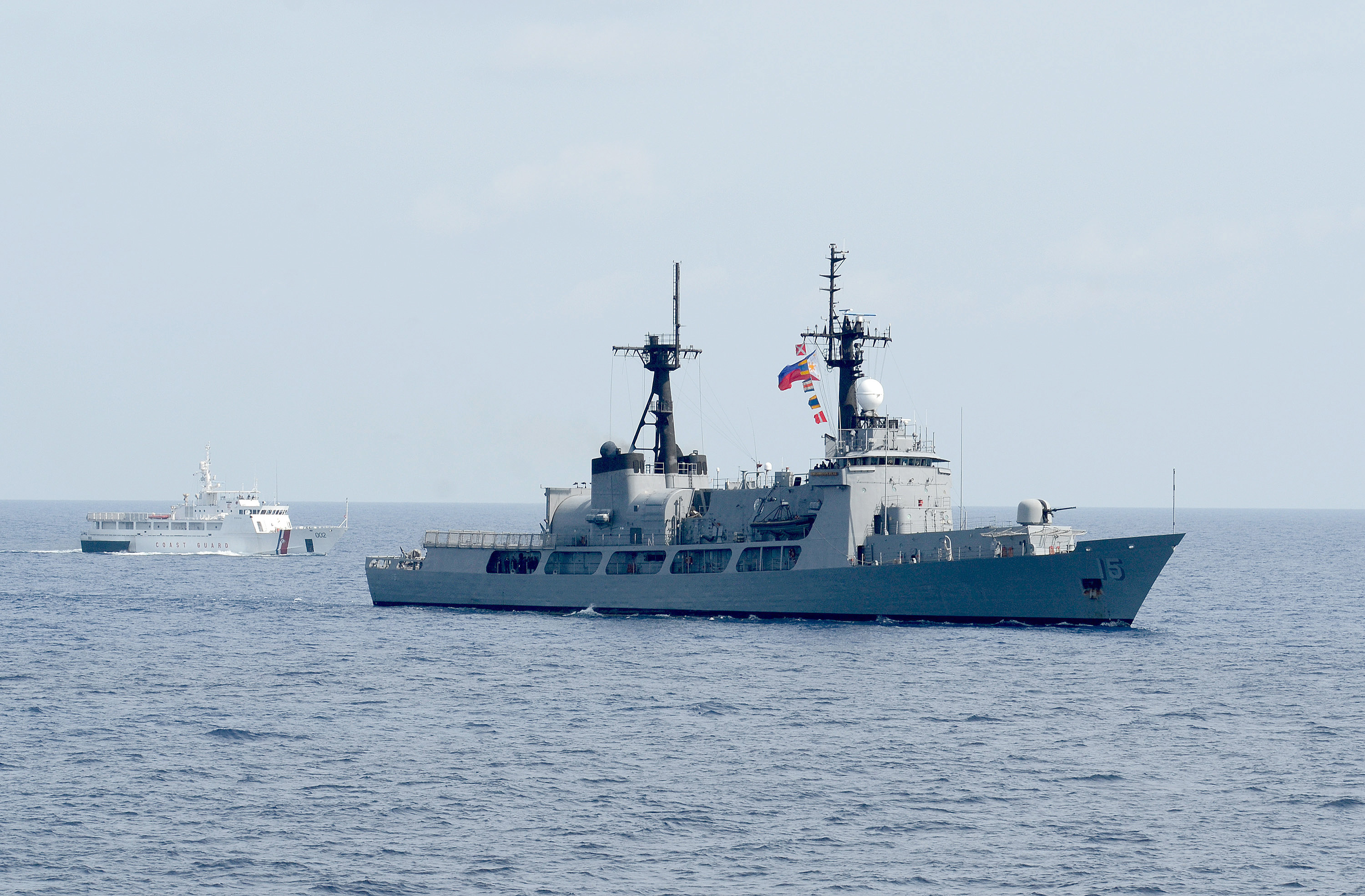
BRP Gregorio del Pilar steam in formation together with BRP Edsa Dos during the sea phase of CARAT Philippines 2013.

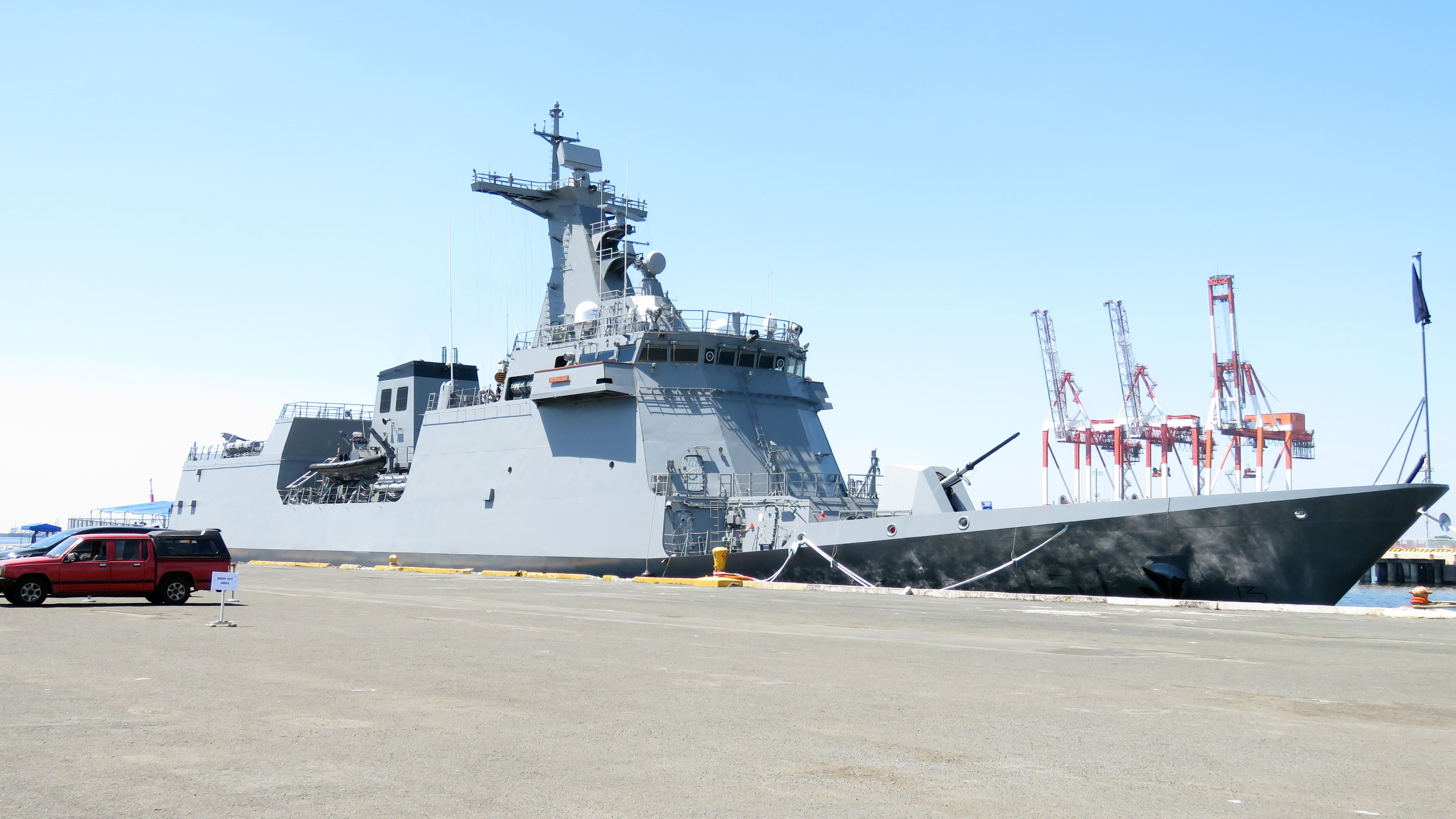
The BRP Antonio Luna (FF-151) Frigate of the Philippine Navy (PN), Photo taken at the Manila South Harbor

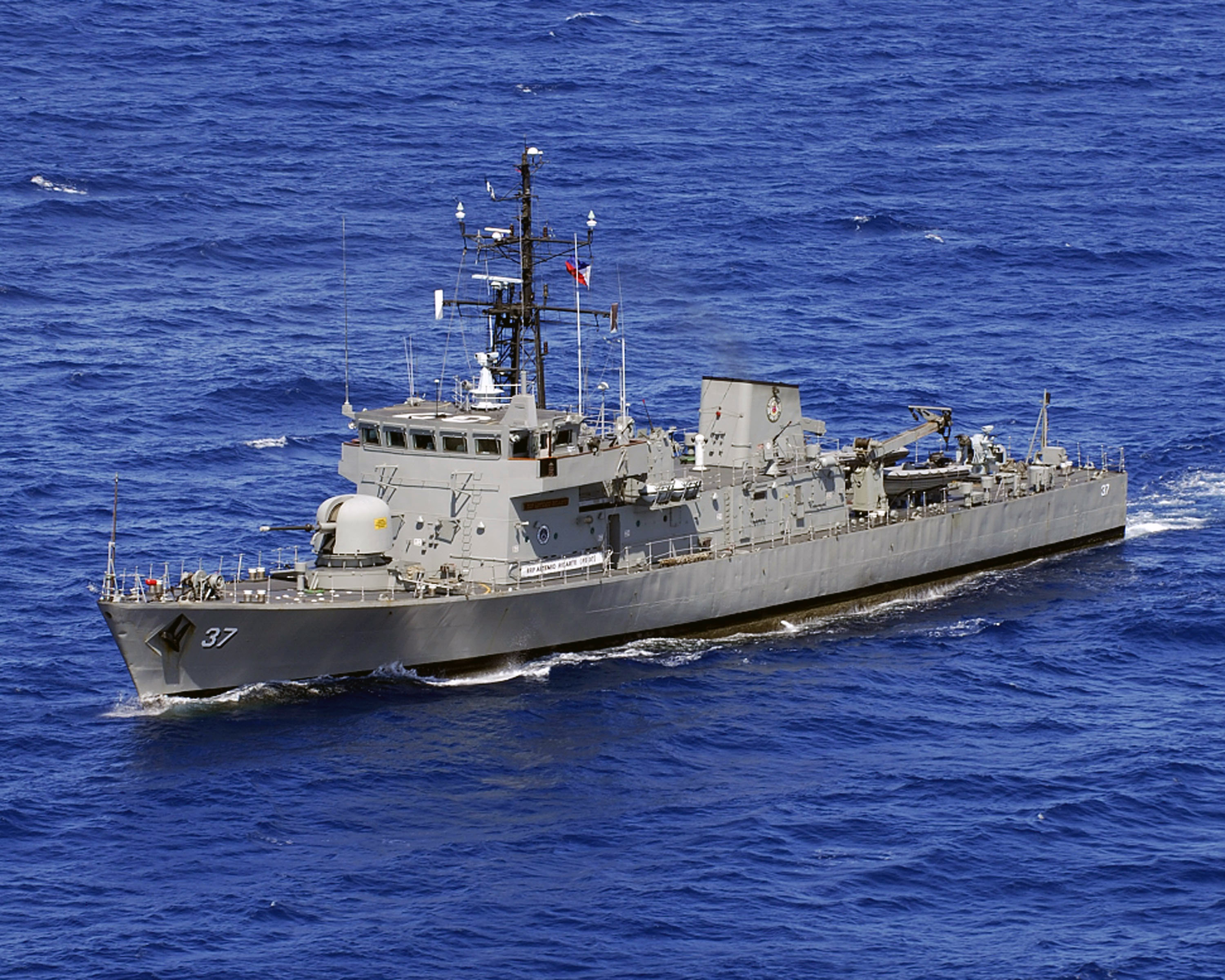
The BRP Artemio Ricarte during the 2008 Balikatan exercise

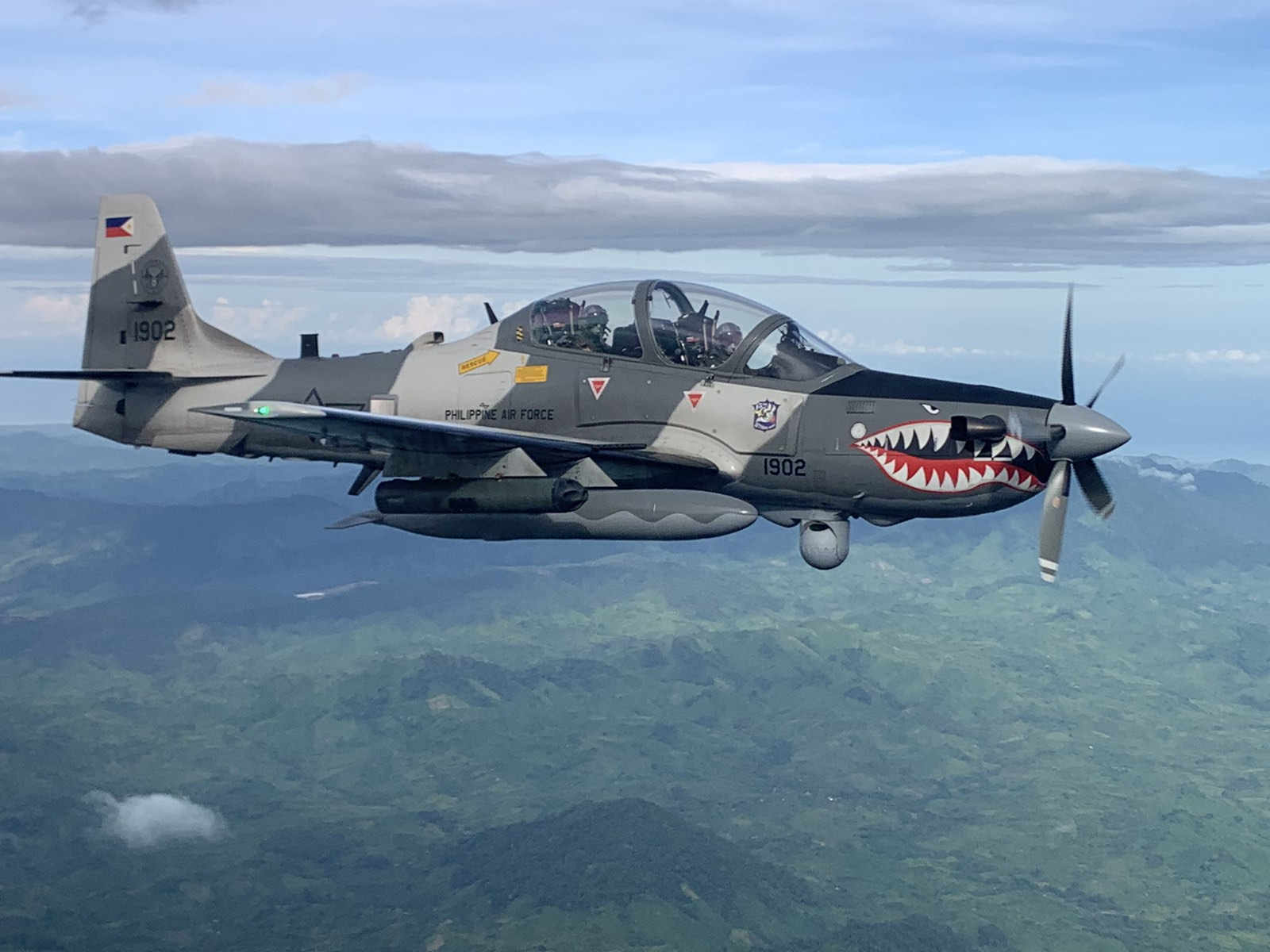
Embraer A-29B Super Tucano of the Philippine Air Force

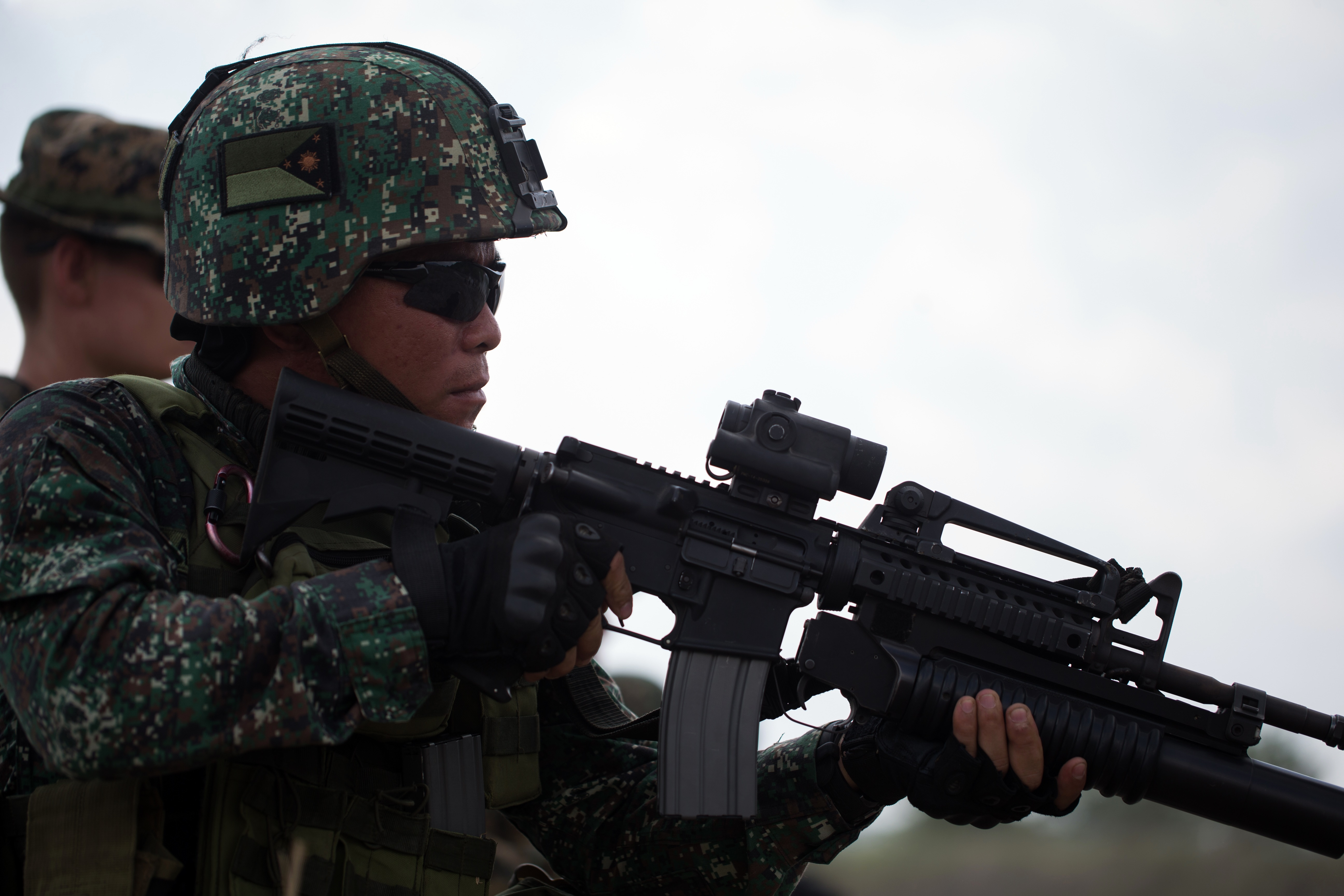
Balikatan 2019 - Combined-Arms Live Fire at CERAB

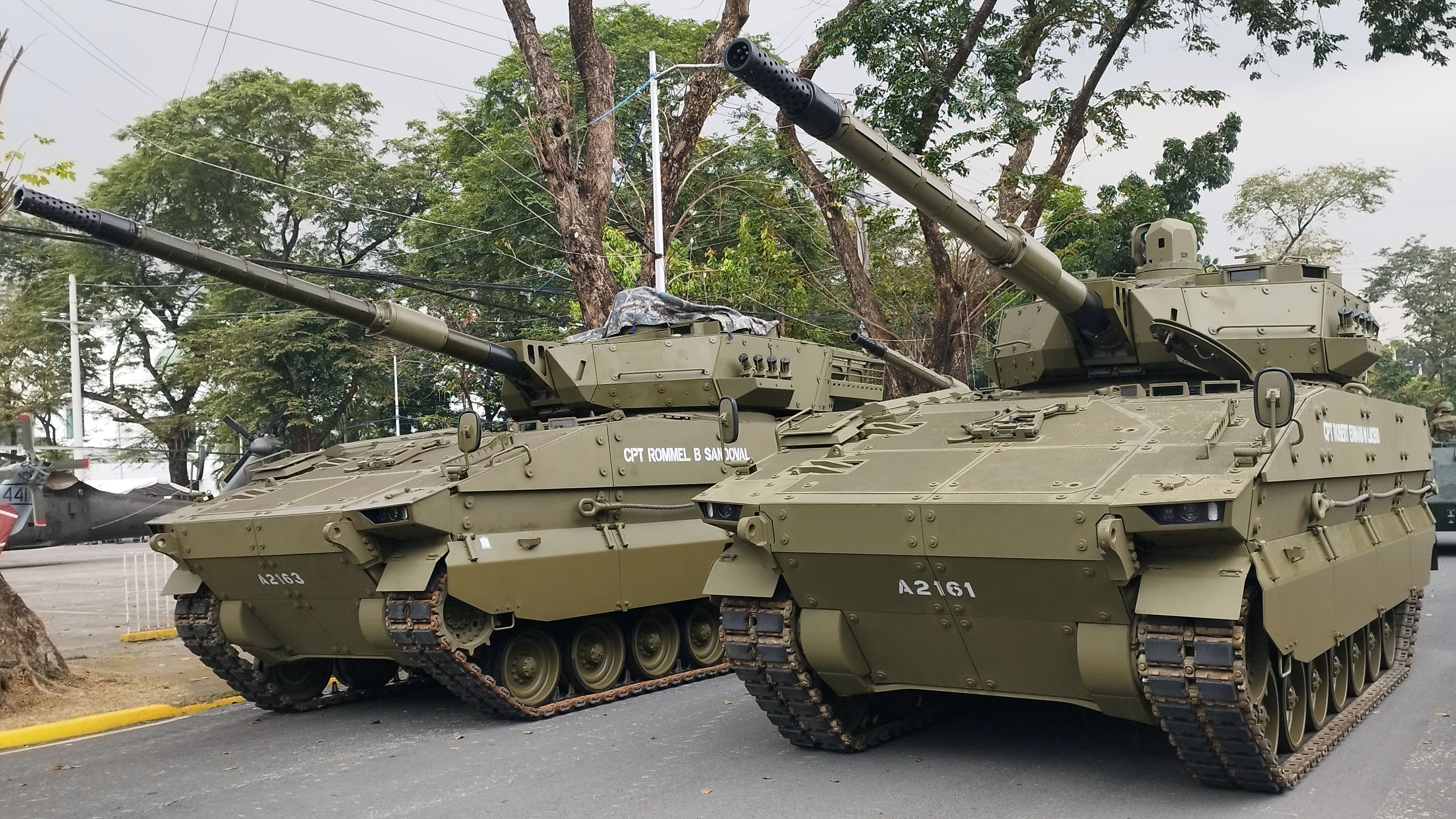
Philippine Army ASCOD II Sabrah light tank

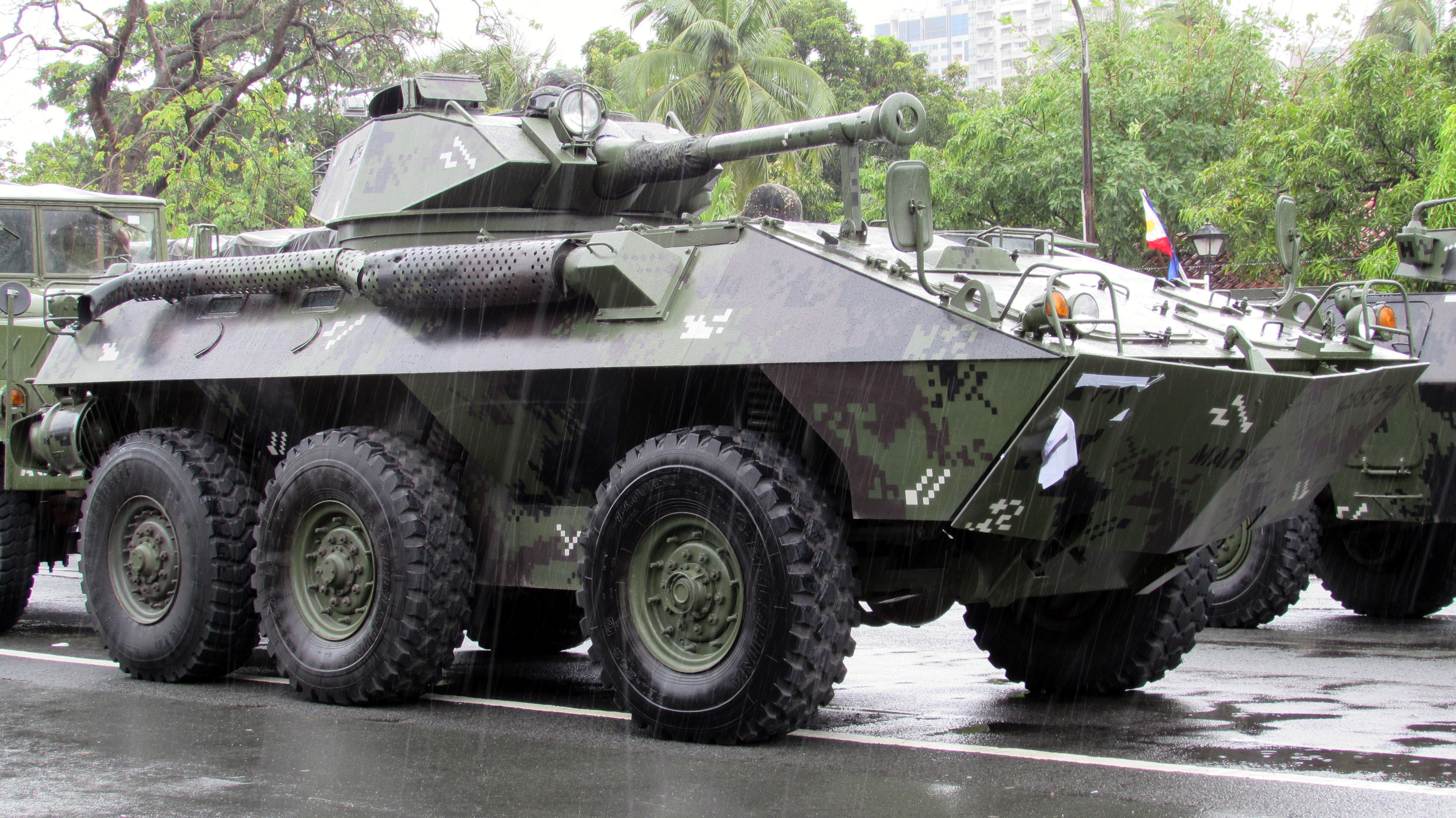
A LAV-300 vehicle of the Philippine Marine Corps (PMC)

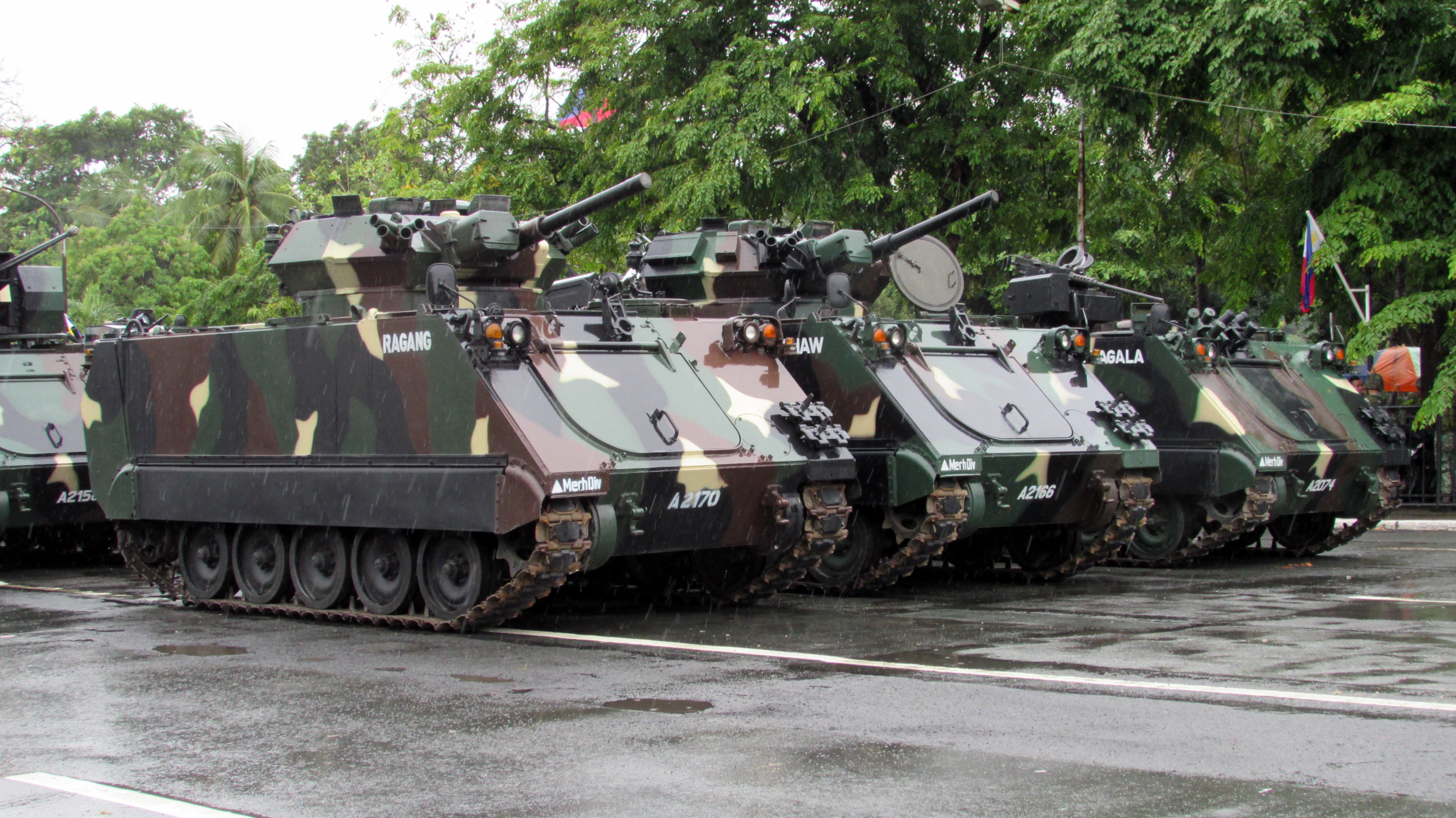
Philippine Army M113A2 FSV - 2018 Kalayaan Parade

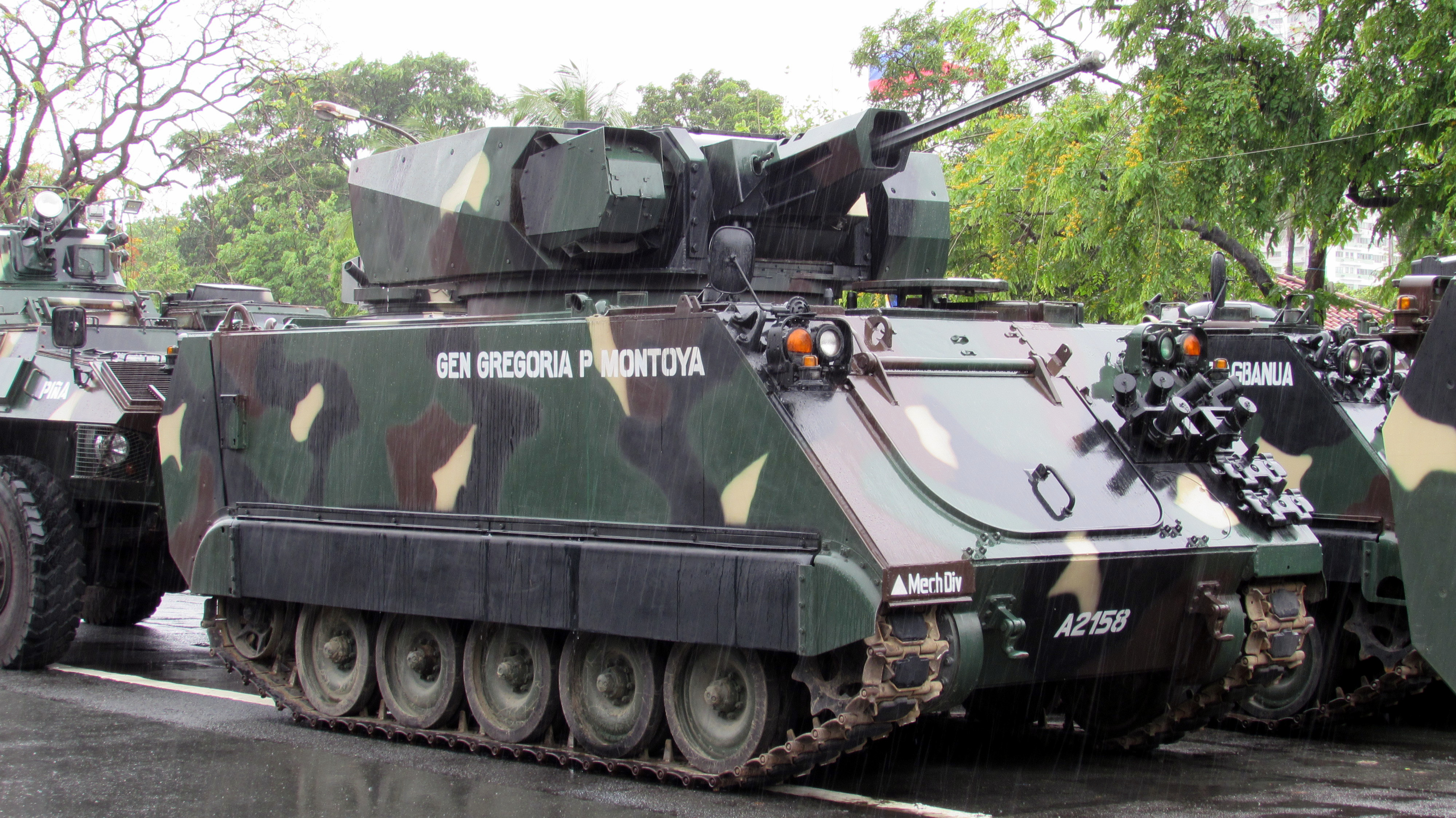
A Philippine Army M113A2 FSV equipped with a UT30 25mm RCWS

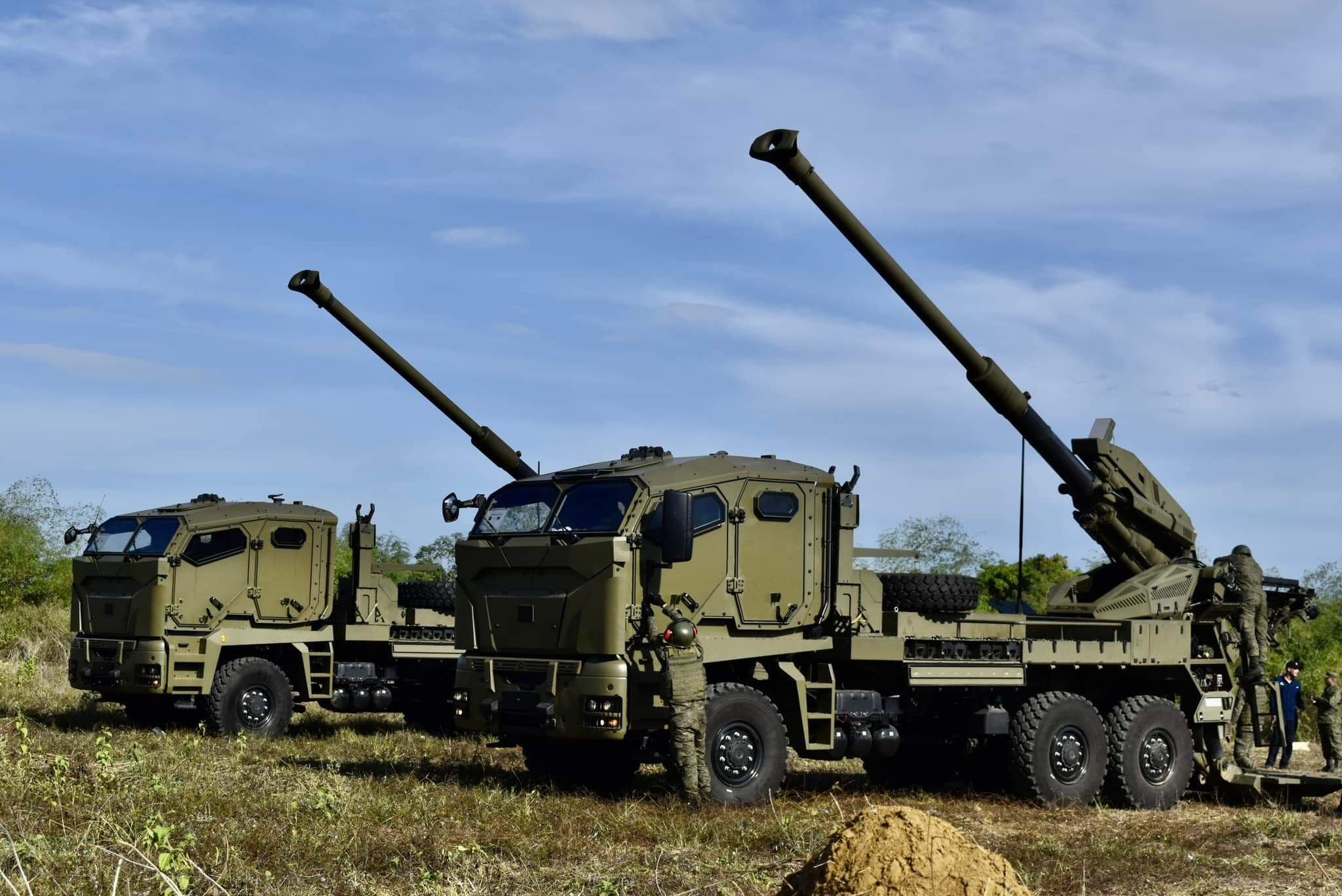
Philippine Army ATMOS-2000

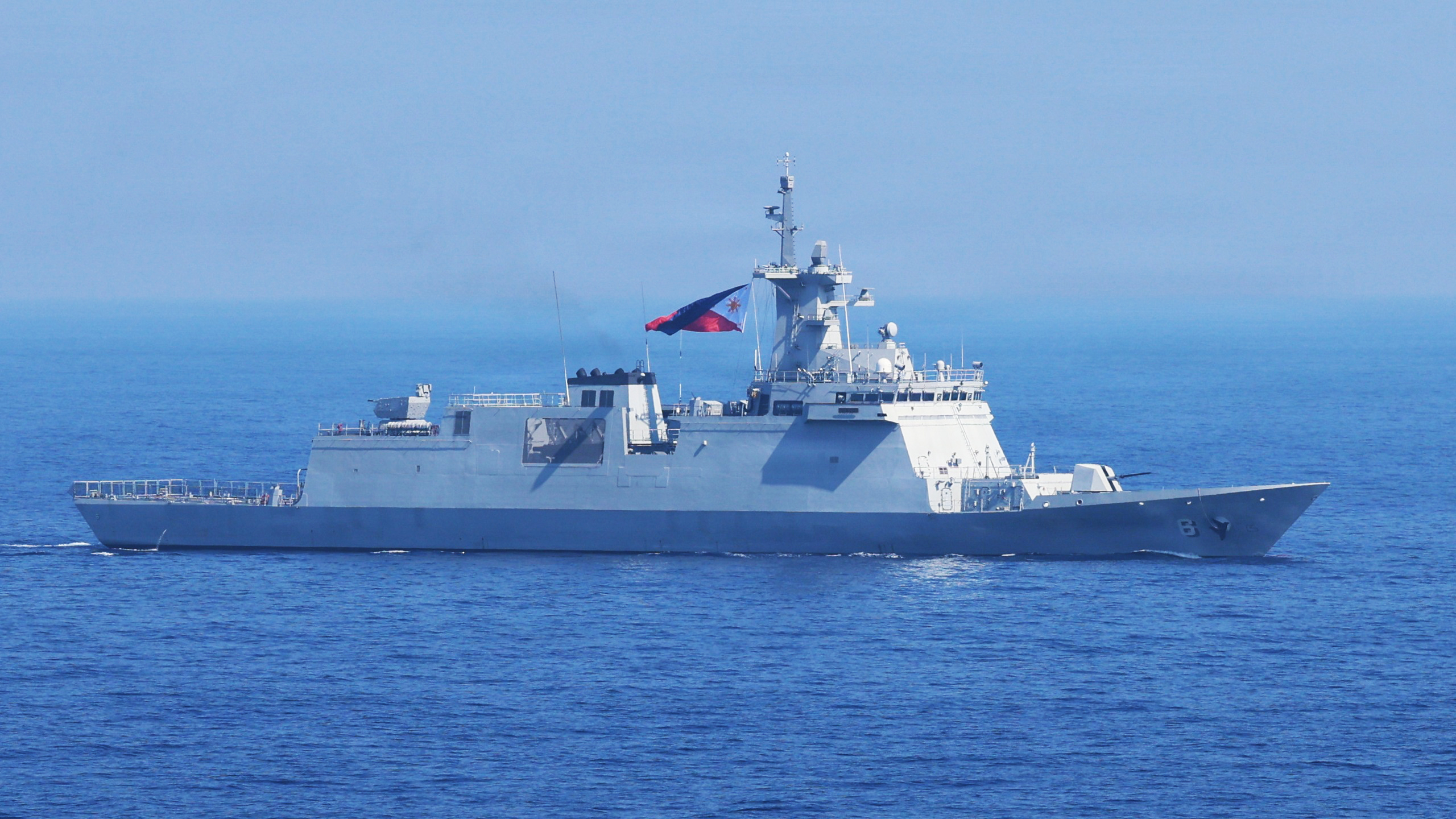
BRP Miguel Malvar (FFG-6)

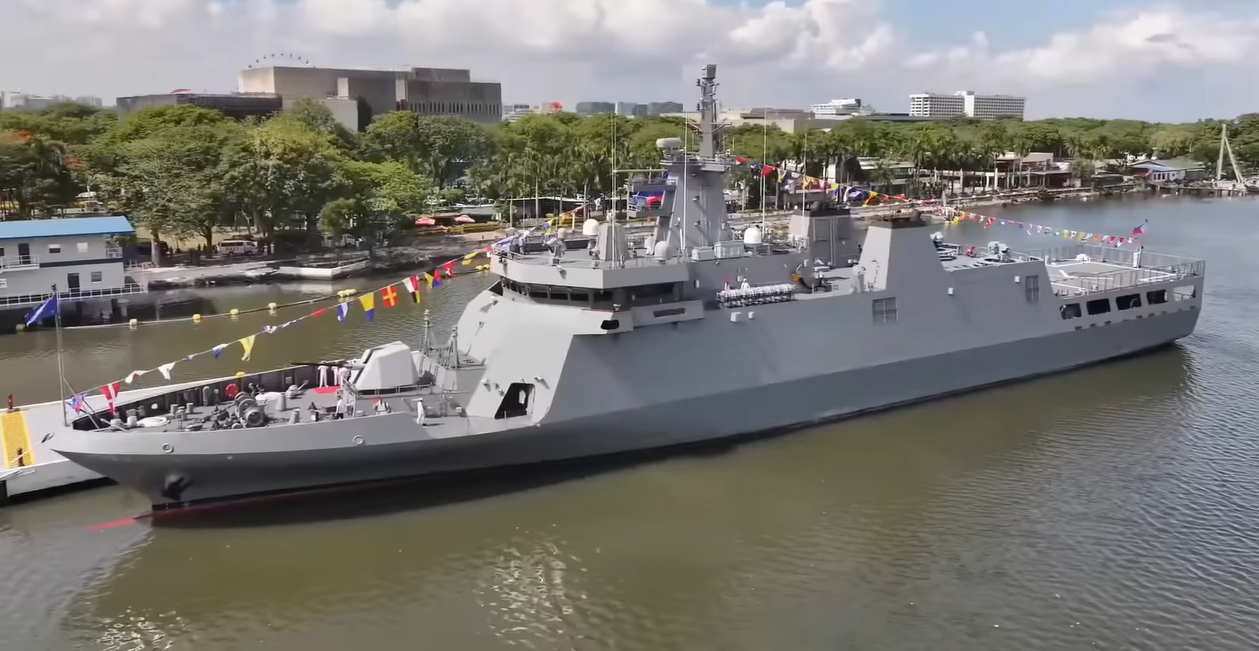
BRP Rajah Lakandula (PS-21)

AFP Flags

Flag of the Armed Forces of the Philippines

Flag of the Philippine Army

Flag of the Philippine Air Force

Flag of the Philippine Navy

Flag of the Philippine Marine Corps

AFP Service Branches Patches

AFP Shoulder Sleeve Insignia
(worn in all authorized Battle Dress Uniforms of all major branches of service in the AFP)

Philippine Army Shoulder Sleeve Insignia
(worn in the Philippine Army Pattern/PhilArPat Battle Dress Uniform)

Philippine Air Force Shoulder Sleeve Insignia
(worn in the Philippine Air Force Pattern/PhilAirPat Battle Dress Uniform)

Philippine Marine Corps breast pocket patch
(worn in the wearer's left breast pocket of the Pixelated Battle Dress Uniform/PBDU)

Philippine Navy Shoulder Sleeve Insignia
(worn in the Sailor's Battle Dress Uniform/SBDU)

AFP emblems and patches in the Commonwealth Era

Emblem of the Philippine Commonwealth Armed Forces, 1935–1946 (Gold)

Shoulder patch of the AFP General Staff, 1946–1965
Emblem of the Philippine Commonwealth Armed Forces, 1935–1946

Shoulder patch of the AFP General Staff, 1946–1965

== See also ==
- AFP Modernization Act
- Security sector governance and reform in the Philippines
- Awards and decorations of the Armed Forces of the Philippines
- List of AFP Chiefs of Staff
- List of the AFP Vice Chief of Staff
- List of the AFP Deputy Chief of Staff
- List of the Chief of the Philippine Constabulary
- Women in the Philippine military
- Philippine Constabulary
- Philippine Revolutionary Army
- Military History of the Philippines
- History of the Philippine Army
- List of conflicts in the Philippines
- List of wars involving the Philippines
