= Rodriguez =

Rodriguez (pronounced [roˈðɾiɣeθ] in Peninsular Spain, or [roˈðɾiɣes] in Latin America) is a Hispanic surname meaning "son of Rodrigo". It is often rendered without the accent mark, primarily outside Hispanophone countries. It may refer to:

== People ==
- Rodríguez (surname), people with the surname or mononym Rodríguez
- Rodrigues (surname), people with the surname Rodrigues

== Music ==
- Sixto Rodriguez (1942–2023), singer-songwriter who recorded and performed under the mononym Rodriguez
- Rodriguez (band), American rock band active in the mid-late 1990s
- Adrián Rodríguez, Spanish actor and singer
- Adrian Rodriguez (DJ), German trance producer and DJ, known as Rodriguez
- Adrian Rodriguez (musician), American musician, bassist of The Airborne Toxic Event
- Magan & Rodriguez, Spanish musical duo
- Martínez Rodríguez, Cuban vocalist who collaborated with Tacabro

== Place names ==
- Rodrigues Island, a dependency of Mauritius in the Indian Ocean
- Rodriguez, California, alternate name of Muroc, California, United States
- Rodriguez, Rizal, municipality in the Philippines

== American court cases ==
- San Antonio Independent School District v. Rodriguez (1973), a decision in which the United States Supreme Court ruled that the Constitution does not confer a fundamental right to receive an education
- Rodriguez v. United States (2015), a decision in which the United States Supreme Court ruled that, without reasonable suspicion, police officers may not extend the length of a traffic stop to conduct a dog sniff
- Ex parte Rodriguez (1874), a decision in which the Texas Supreme Court held the 1873 Texas election unconstitutional, in part because of the placement of a semicolon in the state constitution

== See also ==
- Rodríguez Saá, Argentine family
- Rodrigues (disambiguation)
- Rodriquez (disambiguation)
- Justice Rodriguez (disambiguation)
