= Rodrigo =

Rodrigo (/rɒˈdriːɡɔː/) is a Spanish and Portuguese name derived from the Germanic name Roderick (Gothic *Hroþareiks, via Latinized Rodericus or Rudericus), given specifically in reference to either King Roderic (d. 712), the last Visigothic ruler or to Saint Roderick (d. 857), one of the Martyrs of Córdoba (feast day 13 March). The modern given name has the short forms Ruy, Rui, and in Galician Roy, Roi.

The patronymic surname of this name is "Rodríguez".

The name is very frequently given in Portugal; it was the most popularly given masculine name in 2011–2012, and during 2013–2016 ranked between 4th and 2nd most popular. It is also moderately popular in Spain, ranking between 30th and 60th most popular during 2002–2015.

== History ==
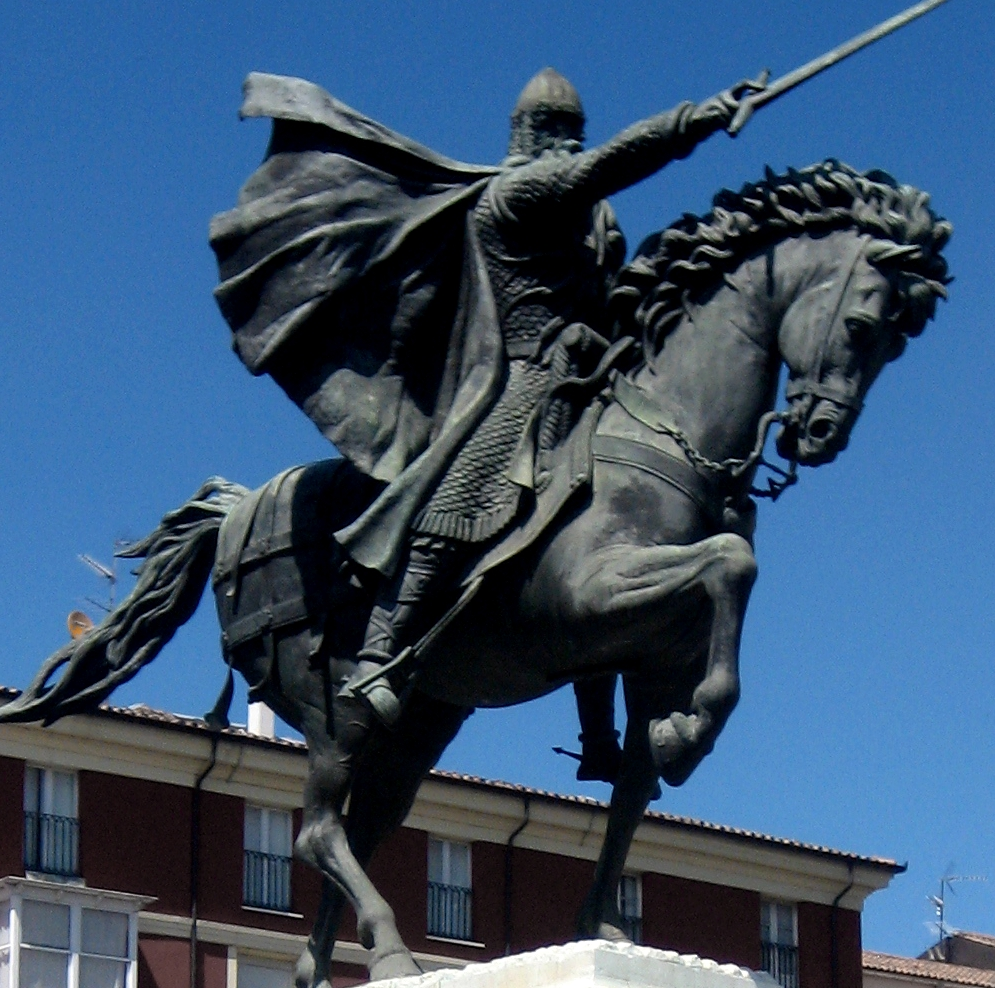
Rodrigo Diaz de Vivar, also known as El Cid

The form Rodrigo becomes current in the later medieval period. It is recorded in the Cantar de Mio Cid, written c. 1200, as the name of Rodrigo Díaz de Vivar (c. 1043–1099, known as El Cid Campeador), and Don Rodrigo king of the Visigoths (688-711), of the Spanish Visigothic Kingdom.

- Rodrigo Jiménez de Rada (c. 1170–1247), Navarrese-born Castilian bishop and historian
- Rodrigo Lanzol Borja (1431–1503), birth name of Pope Alexander VI (r. 1492–1503)
- Rodrigo de Triana, Spanish sailor to have first sighted the New World (i.e., the island of Guanahani) on Columbus' first voyage
- Rodrigo López (physician) (c. 1525–1594), physician to Queen Elizabeth
- Rodrigo de la Guitarra, medieval Spanish musician

== Modern given name ==
- Rodri (footballer, born 1996) (Rodrigo Hernández Cascante), Spanish footballer
- Rodrigão (footballer, born 1995) (Rodrigo de Souza Prado), Brazilian footballer
- Rodrigo (beach soccer player), born 1993, Brazilian beach soccer player
- Rodrigo (footballer, born 1897) (Rodrigo Antonio Brandão, 1897–1959), Brazilian footballer
- Rodrigo (footballer, born 1971) (Rodrigo Martins Vaz), Brazilian footballer
- Rodrigo (footballer, born 1978) (Rodrigo Andreis Galvão), Brazilian footballer
- Rodrigo (footballer, born August 1980) (Rodrigo Baldasso da Costa), Brazilian footballer
- Rodrigo (footballer, born October 1980) (Rodrigo Lacerda Ramos), Brazilian footballer
- Rodrigo (footballer, born 1985) (Rodrigo Leandro da Costa), Brazilian footballer
- Rodrigo (footballer, born 1987) (Rodrigo Fagundes Freitas), Brazilian footballer
- Rodrigo (footballer, born 1991) (Rodrigo Moreno Machado), Brazilian-born Spanish footballer
- Rodrigo (footballer, born 1994) (Rodrigo Vasconcelos Oliveira), Brazilian footballer
- Rodrigo (footballer, born 1999) (Rodrigo Guimarães Santos), Brazilian footballer
- Rodrigo (musician) (1973–2000), Argentine singer
- Rodrigo Augusto da Silva (1833–1889), Brazilian senator that cosigned the Golden Law (Lei Áurea)
- Rodrigo Beckham (born 1976), Brazilian footballer
- Rodrigo Blankenship (born 1997), American football player
- Rodrigo Callapina (16th-century), native Inca nobility
- Rodrigo Camargo (born 1981), Brazilian politician
- Rodrigo Chagas, Brazilian footballer
- Rodrigo Damm (born 1980), Brazilian mixed martial artist
- Rodrigo de la Cadena (born 1988), Mexican singer and performing artist
- Rodrigo De Paul (born 1994), Argentine footballer
- Rodrigo dos Santos, Brazilian water polo player
- Rodrigo Duterte (born 1945), Filipino politician and 16th President of the Philippines (2016–2022)
- Rodrigo Freitas (footballer, born 2002), Portuguese footballer
- Rodrigo Gambale (born 1984), Brazilian politician
- Rodrigo González (Mexican musician) (1950–1985), Mexican musician also known as "Rockdrigo" González
- Rodrigo González (swimmer) (born 1968), Mexican freestyle swimmer
- Rodrigo Gracie (born 1975), retired Brazilian mixed martial artist
- Rodrigo Gral, Brazilian footballer
- Rodrigo Lima (fighter) (born 1991), Brazilian mixed martial artist
- Rodrigo Lima (footballer) (born 1999), Cape Verdean footballer
- Rodrigo Lindoso, Brazilian footballer
- Rodrigo Macedo (born 1998), Portuguese footballer
- Rodrigo Masias (born 1981), Peruvian basketball player
- Rodrigo Moreno (athlete) (born 1966), Colombian race walker
- Rodrigo Ninja (born 1981), Brazilian footballer
- Rodrigo Núñez, Chilean footballer
- Rodrigo Palacio, Argentine footballer
- Rodrigo Pessoa, Brazilian equestrian
- Rodrigo Pesántez Rodas (1937–2020), Ecuadorian poet and writer
- Rodrigo Santoro, Brazilian actor
- Rodrigo Soares (born 1992), Brazilian footballer known as Rodrigo
- Rodrigo Tiuí, Brazilian footballer
- Rodrigo Tosi, Brazilian footballer

== Modern surname ==
- América del Pilar Rodrigo, Argentine botanist who used the standard botanical abbreviation "Rodrigo"
- Bing Rodrigo (1954–2001), Filipino singer
- Dushantha Lakshman Rodrigo (born 1968), Sri Lankan Sinhala Anglican cleric, Anglican Bishop of Colombo
- Granville Rodrigo (1958–1999), Sri Lankan Sinhala actor and vocalist
- Joaquín Rodrigo (1901–1999), Spanish composer
- José Sisto Rodrigo, Commissioner of Guam
- Joseph Lionel Christie Rodrigo (1895–1972), Sri Lankan academic
- Lakshan Rodrigo (born 1987), Sri Lankan Sinhala cricketer
- Lasantha Rodrigo (born 1938), Sri Lankan cricketer
- Lasantha Rodrigo (general), Sri Lankan Army officer and the 25th Commander
- Mahesh Rodrigo (1927–2011), Sri Lankan Sinhala cricketer and rugby player
- Malcolm Rodrigo, Sri Lankan Sinhala cricketer
- Manoj Rodrigo (born 1983), Sri Lankan Sinhala cricketer
- Nalin Rodrigo, Sri Lankan Sinhala obstetrician, gynecologist, surgeon, medical teacher and medical administrator
- Olivia Rodrigo (born 2003), American singer-songwriter and actress
- Philip Rodrigo, Sri Lankan Sinhala politician
- Sandaruwan Rodrigo (born 1997), Sri Lankan Sinhala cricketer
- Sanjaya Rodrigo (born 1979), Sri Lankan Sinhala cricketer
- Teresa Rodrigo (1956–2020), Spanish scientist specializing in particle physics

== See also ==
- Rodrigues (disambiguation)
- Rodriguez (disambiguation)
- Rodriguinho (disambiguation)
