= Rodrigues (surname) =

Origin
- Language: Portuguese

Other names
- Variant forms: Ruiz, Rodríguez

Rodrigues (/rɒˈdriːɡz/, Portuguese: /ʁu.ˈdɾi.ɡɨʃ/) is a common surname in the Portuguese language.

Origin: Germanic patronymic Hrod + ric, meaning Son of Rodrigo or Son of Rui. The "es" signifies "son of". The name Rodrigo (or the short form Rui) is the Portuguese form of Roderick, meaning "famous power" or "famous ruler", from the Germanic elements "hrod" (fame) and "ric" (power), from the Proto-Germanic *Hrōþirīk(i)az. It was the name of Roderic, the last Visigothic King of Iberia.

== General ==
- Andrei Rodrigues, Brazilian federal police delegate
- Claudine Hermann (née Rodrigues), (1945-2021), French physicist
- Diogo Rodrigues, Portuguese explorer
- Eliane R. Rodrigues, Brazilian-Mexican applied mathematician and statistician
- Jan Rodrigues, the first free black man to live in New York City
- João Rodrigues Cabrilho (1497–1543), Portuguese explorer
- Jose Rod de Parra (1938–2014), Indian comedian and actor
- João Rodrigues de Castelo Branco (1511–1568), known as Amato Lusitano, Portuguese physician
- Olinde Rodrigues (1795–1851), French banker and mathematician
- Sarmento Rodrigues (1899–1979), Portuguese marine official, colonist and professor
- Valerian Rodrigues (born 1949), Indian Political Scientist

== Arts ==
- Amália Rodrigues (1920–1999), Portuguese Fado singer
- Camila Rodrigues, Brazilian actress
- Flávio Rodrigues (born 1979), Brazilian flamenco guitarist and composer
- Francisco Rodrigues Lobo, Portuguese poet
- Jose Maria Rodrigues Jr., known as Joe Junior, Hong Kong actor and former singer
- Nelson Rodrigues, Brazilian writer
- Rodrigues Ottolengui, American writer and dentist
- Urbano Tavares Rodrigues, Portuguese writer
- Vasco Rodrigues Santana, Portuguese actor
- Victor Rodrigues, Indian novelist and short story writer

== Politics ==
- Américo de Deus Rodrigues Thomaz, Portuguese admiral and politician
- Anabela Miranda Rodrigues, Portuguese politician
- Anabela Sousa Rodrigues, Portuguese politician
- Anabela Rodrigues (MEP), Portuguese politician
- Bernard Rodrigues, Singaporean politician
- Carmona Rodrigues, Portuguese politician
- Ferro Rodrigues, Portuguese politician
- Francisco de Paula Rodrigues Alves, Brazilian politician
- Hermes Rodrigues da Fonseca, Brazilian politician
- Pedro Verona Rodrigues Pires, Cape Verdean politician
- Rudolph Rodrigues, Indian MP for Anglo Indian from Calcutta, West Bengal
- Sunith Francis Rodrigues, Indian military and politician

== Religion ==
- John Rodrigues (born 1967), Catholic prelate in India
- Max Rodrigues, Pakistani Catholic priest, 4th Bishop of Hyderabad, Pakistan
- Simão Rodrigues, Portuguese Jesuit

== Sports ==
- Adri Rodrígues (born 1988), Andorran international footballer
- Camila Rodrigues (born 2001), Brazilian footballer
- Christine Bannon-Rodrigues (born 1966), American martial artist and actress
- Conceição Rodrigues (born 1919), Portuguese footballer
- Evan Rodrigues (born 1993), Canadian ice hockey player
- Garry Rodrigues (born 1990), Dutch-Cape Verdean footballer
- Ivo Rodrigues (runner) (born 1960), Brazilian long-distance runner
- Ivo Rodrigues (footballer) (born 1995), Portuguese footballer
- Karin Rodrigues, Brazilian volleyball player
- Kosta Rodrigues, German football player
- Michael Rodrigues, Pakistani Catholic tennis player
- Mônica Rodrigues, Brazilian volleyball player
- Jemimah Rodrigues, Indian cricketer
- Nelly Rodrigues (born 2003), Portuguese footballer
- Peter Rodrigues (born 1944), Welsh footballer
- Raissa Rodrigues (born 1998), Brazilian curler
- Rodrigues (footballer) (born 1997), Brazilian footballer
- Thiago Rodrigues (footballer) (born 1988), Brazilian footballer
- Tiago Rodrigues (born 1992), Portuguese footballer
- Tiago Rodrigues (racing driver) (born 2007), Macanese racing driver

== See also ==
- Portuguese name
