= Rodriquez =

Rodriquez may refer to:

== People ==
People with the surname Rodriquez include:

- Carmen Espinoza-Rodriquez (born 1970), American singer-songwriter
- Tim A. Rodriquez, American astronomer and minor planet discoverer

People with the given name Rodriquez include:

- Jacquees (Rodriquez Jacquees Broadnax; born 1994), American R&B singer and songwriter from Atlanta, Georgia

== Places ==
- Rodriquez Pond

== See also ==
- United States v. Rodriquez, 2008 United States Supreme Court case
- Estate of Rodriquez v. Drummond Co., 2003/2007 lawsuit filed in the United States District Court for the Northern District of Alabama
- Rodríguez (disambiguation)
- Rodrigues (disambiguation)
- Rodríguez (surname) and Rodrigues (surname), people with similar surnames
