= Rodriguinho =

Rodriguinho is a diminutive form of the given name Rodrigo, and refers to:

- Rodriguinho (footballer, born 1980), full name Rodrigo Antônio Lopes Belchior, Brazilian football forward
- Rodriguinho (footballer, born 1982), full name Rodrigo Castro Cesar Cabral, Brazilian football midfielder
- Rodriguinho (footballer, born 1983), full name Rodrigo Batista da Cruz, Brazilian football striker
- Rodriguinho (footballer, born 1984), full name Rodrigo Alves da Silva Santos, Brazilian football forward
- Rodriguinho (footballer, born 1988), full name Rodrigo Eduardo Costa Marinho, Brazilian football attacking midfielder
- Rodriguinho (footballer, born 2001), full name Rodrigo Araújo da Silva Filho, Brazilian football forward
- Rodriguinho (footballer, born 2003), full name Rodrigo Henrique Santos de Souza, Brazilian football midfielder
- Rodriguinho (footballer, born 2004), full name Rodrigo Huendra Almeida Mendonça, Brazilian football midfielder
- Rodriguinho (singer) (born 1978), Brazilian singer
- Rodriguinho (volleyball) (born 1996), Brazilian volleyball player
