= Rizal's 4th congressional district =

Legislative district of the Philippines

- Constituency for the House of Representatives of the Philippines
- Scope of the district within the province

- Location of Rizal within the Philippines
- Province: Rizal
- Region: Calabarzon
- Population: 443,954 (2020)
- Electorate: 2019,447 (2025)
- Major settlements: Rodriguez
- Area: 312.70 km^{2} (120.73 sq mi)

Current constituency
- Created: 2021
- Representative: Dennis Hernandez
- Political party: NPC
- Congressional bloc: Majority

Rizal's 4th congressional district is one of the four congressional districts of the Philippines in the province of Rizal. It has been represented in the House of Representatives since 2022. The district consists of the northern municipality of Rodriguez. It is currently represented in the 20th Congress by Dennis Hernandez of the Nationalist People's Coalition (NPC).

== Representation history ==
#	Image	Member	Tenure		Congress	Party	Electoral history	Constituent LGUs
#	Image	Member	Start	End	Congress	Party	Electoral history	Constituent LGUs
=== Rizal's 4th district for the House of Representatives of the Philippines ===
District created April 12, 2021.
1		Juan Fidel Felipe F. Nograles	June 30, 2022	June 30, 2025	19th	Lakas	Redistricted from the 2nd district and re-elected in 2022.	2022–present Rodriguez (Montalban)
2		Dennis Hernandez	June 30, 2025	Incumbent	20th	NPC	Elected in 2025.	2022–present Rodriguez (Montalban)

== Election results ==
=== 2025 ===
2025 Philippine House of Representatives election in Rizal's 4th district
Party	Candidate	Votes	%
NPC	Tom Hernandez	87,659	52.28
Lakas	Fidel Nograles	80,004	47.72
Valid ballots		167,663	96.44
Invalid or blank votes		6,195	3.56
Total votes		173,858	100.00
NPC gain from Lakas			

=== 2022 ===
2022 Philippine House of Representatives election in the 4th district of Rizal
Party	Candidate	Votes	%
Lakas	Fidel Nograles	92,176	58.83
NPC	Isidro Rodriguez, Jr.	32,955	21.03
PFP	Bonna Aquino	31,550	20.13
Valid ballots		156,681	94.11
Invalid or blank votes		9,800	5.89
Total votes		166,481	100.00
Lakas win (new seat)			

== See also ==
- Legislative districts of Rizal
