= Judge Rodriguez =

Judge Rodriguez may refer to:

- Fernando Rodriguez Jr. (born 1969), judge of the United States District Court for the Southern District of Texas
- Joseph H. Rodriguez (born 1930), judge of the United States District Court for the District of New Jersey
- Regina M. Rodriguez (born 1963), judge of the United States District Court for the District of Colorado
- Xavier Rodriguez (born 1961), judge of the United States District Court for the Western District of Texas

== See also ==
- Justice Rodriguez (disambiguation)
