= S Uciredor =

14th-century French composer

Rodericus was a French composer of the 14th century.

Rodericus is known through a single ballade attributed to him in the Chantilly Codex as S. Uciredor, which is an anadrome of "Rodericus". The piece, Angelorum Psalat, is in two voices and is an exemplary work of the Ars subtilior style, with many similarities to works of Jacob Senleches. Angelorum Psalat exhibits considerable rhythmic complexity and its text employs contrasting imagery of original sin and the harmony of the spheres, a common poetic device of the age.

Nothing is known of Rodericus's life, although Gilbert Reaney suggested that he is Rodrigo de la Guitarra, since Rodrigo is the only known contemporaneous musician with the same name. However, this Rodrigo appears in Toledo as late as 1458, which would have made him extraordinarily long-lived, even assuming he composed maturely from a young age. No other supporting evidence had arisen since Reaney's conjecture.

Crawford Young suggested in 2008 that Rodericus is the musician and clergyman Johannes Rogerii. Young argues that the author of Angelorum Psalat must have been an extremely well developed composer and musician. Rogerii is a plausible candidate, since his terms of service in various courts closely tracked with those of composers whose style resembles that developed in Angelorum Psalat. He preceded Jacob Senleches at the cardinal's court in Aragon and was contemporaneous or nearly so with composers such as Hasprois and Guido de Lange at the court of Pope Benedict XIII. Guido makes use of the semiminima very similarly to Rodericus. Young's main argument is the veiled reference to Pope Innocent VII, who appears in the last word of the ballade as "Innocui" (innocent) with an otherwise unmotivated first initial letter. In other sections of the ballade there are other letters "i" as initials, or an "in" aside from the meter of the poem, indicating that this "in" is a wild beast corrupting the unity of the world, or the papal world, since pope Benedict, for whom Rogerii worked, felt himself to be the true pope: "in retro mordens ut fera pessima" (in ...: retreat! biting wild horrible beast). Rogerii also named himself "Vatignies", apparently after a little northern French community until today (Wattignies), in the close vicinity of either Senlecques or Salesches, where the composer Senleches may have come from. Senleches was the main reference point for the new signs for subtle note values used in "Angelorum psalat". In his later years, Rogerii was a distinguished member of the papal chapel, which he reentered in 1396 earning the commendation "omnes et singule exemptiones, immunitates, franchisie ac libertates capellanorum et familiarum"
