= Dennis Hernandez =

Filipino politician

Dennis L. Hernandez
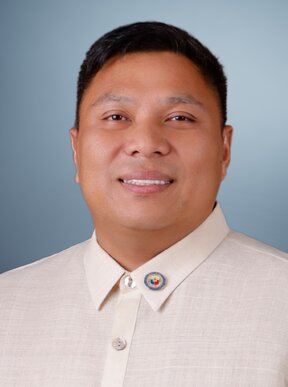
- Official portrait, 2026

Member of the Philippine House of Representatives from Rizal's 4th district
- Incumbent
- Assumed office June 30, 2025
- Preceded by: Juan Fidel Felipe Nograles

Mayor of Rodriguez
- In office June 30, 2019 – June 30, 2022
- Vice Mayor: Anecito Lirazan
- Preceded by: Cecilio Hernandez
- Succeeded by: Ronnie Evangelista

Vice Mayor of Rodriguez
- In office June 30, 2016 – June 30, 2019
- Mayor: Cecillio Hernandez
- Succeeded by: Anecito Lirazan

Personal details
- Born: Dennis Linco Hernandez; July 19, 1984 (age 42) Rodriguez, Rizal, Philippines
- Party: NPC (2016–present)
- Relations: Karen Mae Hernandez (sister)
- Parent: Cecilio Hernandez (father)
- Profession: Politician

Dennis "Tom" Linco Hernandez (born July 19, 1984) is a Filipino politician who has served as the representative for Rizal's fourth district since 2025. Before being elected to Congress, he served as the mayor of Rodriguez, Rizal, from 2019 to 2022.

In the May 13, 2019, election, he ran for mayor under the banner of the Nationalist People's Coalition and defeated independent candidates Romeo Grecia, Felicisimo Salvador, and Herminio Balinas.
