= Rodrigues (disambiguation) =

Rodrigues is an island in the Indian Ocean, administratively part of Mauritius.

Rodrigues may also refer to:

== Places ==
- Rodrigues triple junction, a tectonic triple junction near Rodrigues
- Rodrigues College, a secondary school on Rodrigues
- Cândido Rodrigues, a municipality in São Paulo, Brazil

== People ==
- Rodrigues (surname)
- Rodrigues (footballer, born 1946), full name José Rodrigues dos Santos, Brazilian footballer
- Rodrigues (footballer, born 1997), full name Antônio Josenildo Rodrigues de Oliveira, Brazilian footballer
- Rodrigues Neto (1949–2019), full name José Rodrigues Neto, Brazilian footballer

== Other uses ==
- Rodrigues solitaire, an extinct flightless bird that was endemic to the island of Rodrigues
- Rodrigues' rotation formula, a vector formula for a rotation in space, given its axis
- Rodrigues' formula, a mathematical expression

== See also ==
- Rodriguez (disambiguation)
- Rodriquez (disambiguation)
