= Rodriguez, Rizal =

Municipality in Rizal, Philippines

Rodriguez Montalban
- Municipality
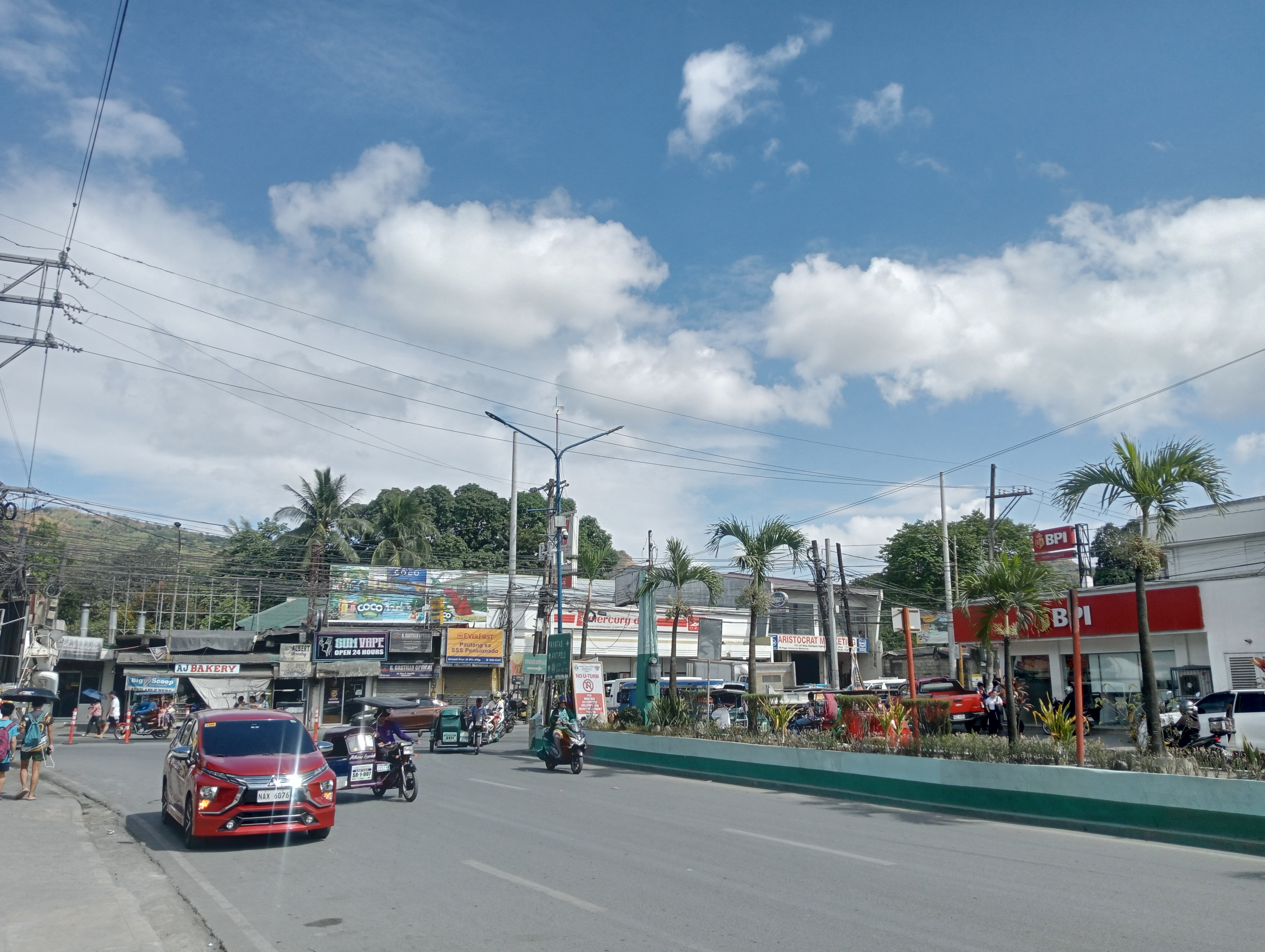
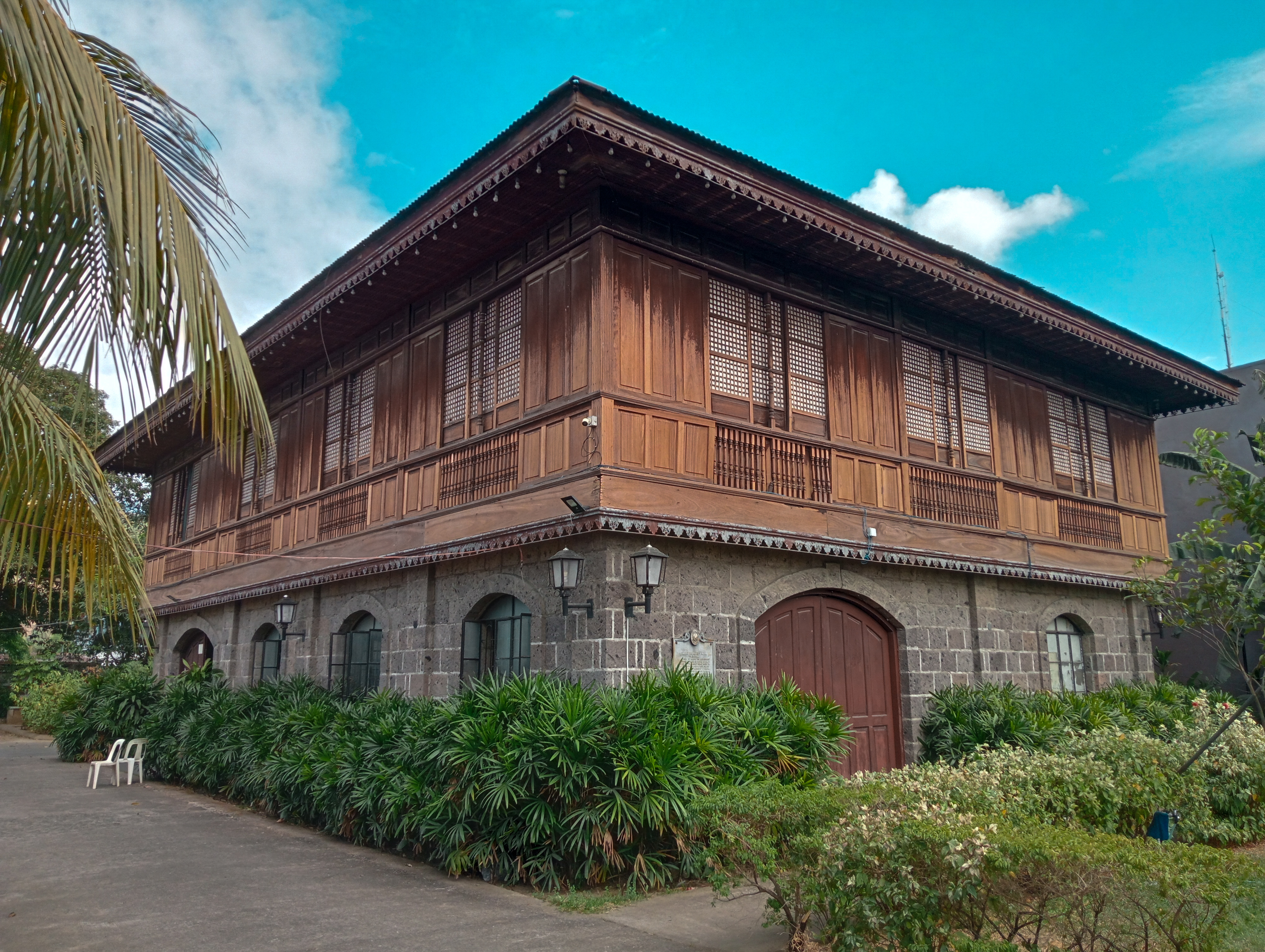
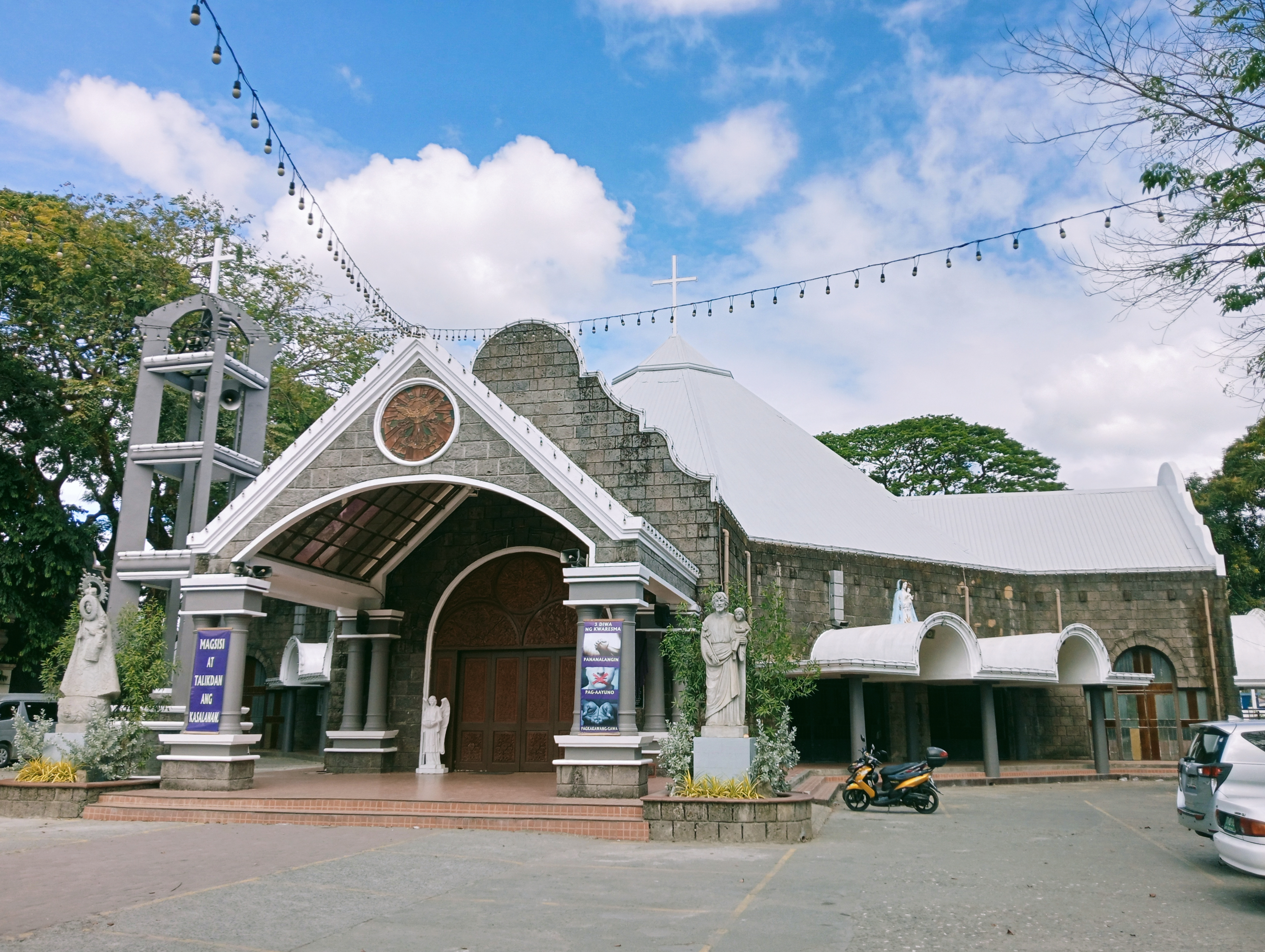
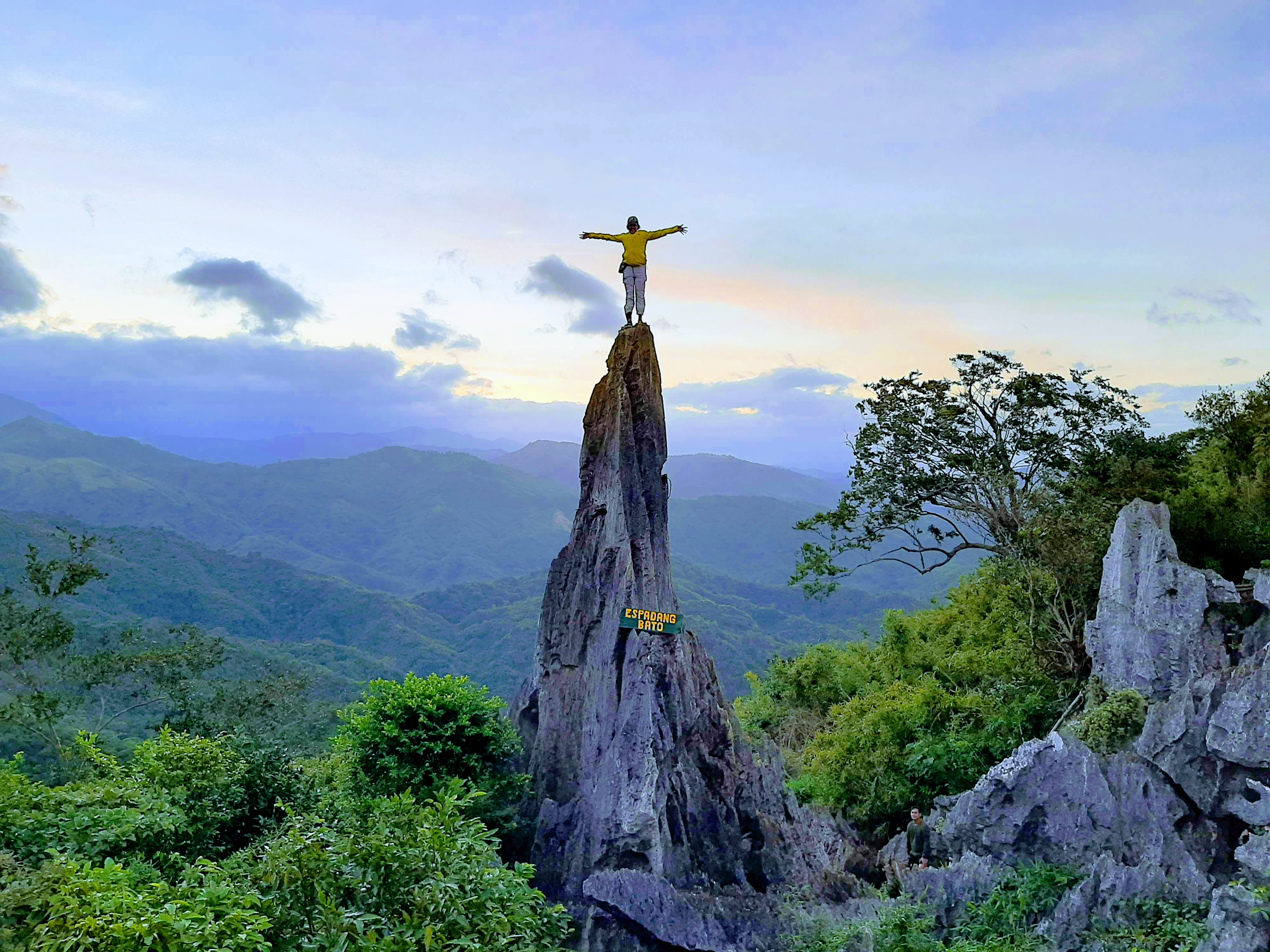
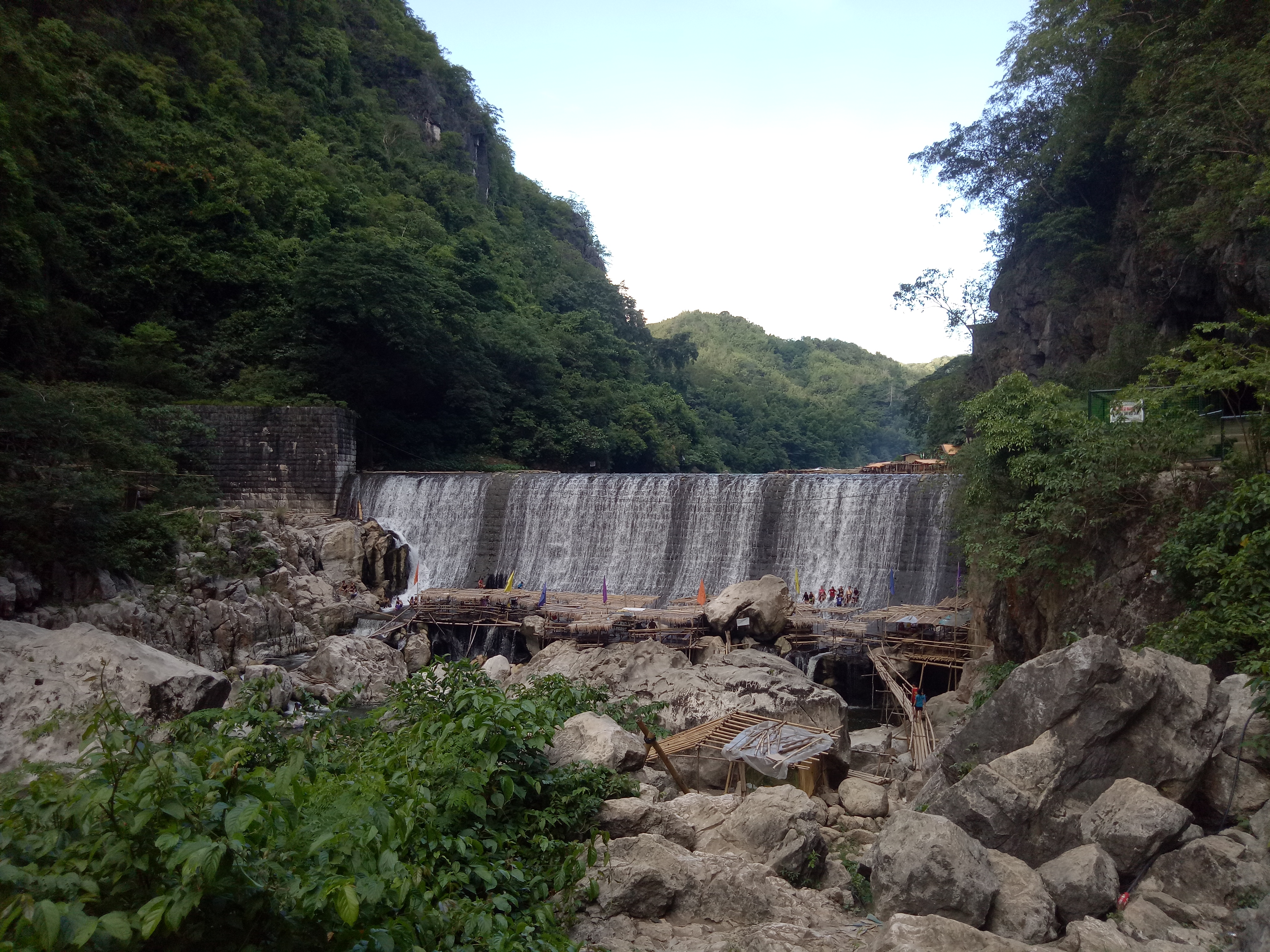
- (From top, left to right) Eulogio Rodriguez Highway, Eulogio Rodriguez Ancestral House, Nuestra Señora del Santísimo Rosario Parish Church, Espadang Bato, Wawa Dam

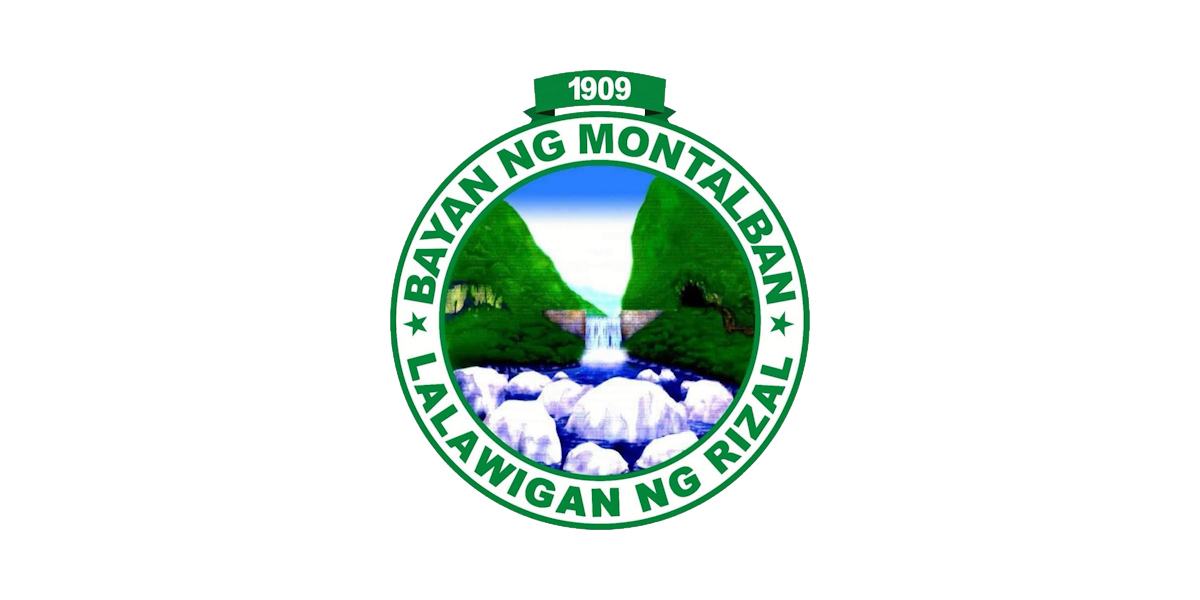
- Flag Seal
- Anthem: Mahal Naming Rodriguez; English: Our Beloved Rodriguez
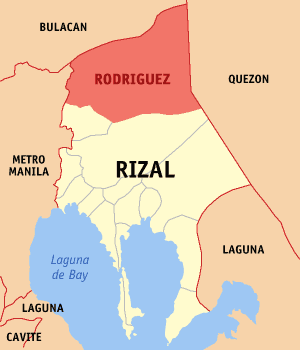
- Map of Rizal with Rodriguez highlighted
- Interactive map of Rodriguez
- Location within the Philippines
- Coordinates: 14°43′N 121°07′E
- Country: Philippines
- Region: Calabarzon
- Province: Rizal
- District: 4th district
- Founded: 1871
- Annexation to San Mateo: October 12, 1903
- Reestablished: February 29, 1908
- Renamed as Rodriguez: November 12, 1982
- Named for: Eulogio Rodriguez
- Barangays: 11 (see Barangays)

Government
  - Type: Sangguniang Bayan
  - Mayor: Ronnie S. Evangelista
  - Vice Mayor: Edgardo Sison
  - Representative: Dennis L. Hernandez
  - Municipal Council: Members: Mark David C. Acob; Richard M. Buizon; Anne A. Cuerpo; Arnel M. De Vera; Mario Roderick C. Lazarte; Mark Anthony C. Marcelo; Ralph Ivan A. Rodriguez; Ronaldo R. Umali
  - Electorate: 219,447 voters (2025)

Area
  - Total: 312.70 km^{2} (120.73 sq mi)
- Elevation: 112 m (367 ft)
- Highest elevation: 487 m (1,598 ft)
- Lowest elevation: 10 m (33 ft)

Population (2024 census)
  - Total: 451,383
  - Rank: 1 out of 1,489 Municipalities
  - Density: 1,443.5/km^{2} (3,738.7/sq mi)
  - Households: 100,823

Economy
  - Income class: 1st municipal income class
  - Poverty incidence: 12.51% (2023)
  - Revenue: ₱ 1,456 million (2024)
  - Assets: ₱ 3,074 million (2024)
  - Expenditure: ₱ 1,401 million (2024)
  - Liabilities: ₱ 1,006 million (2024)

Service provider
  - Electricity: Manila Electric Company (Meralco)
- Time zone: UTC+8 (PST)
- ZIP code: 1860
- PSGC: 0405808000
- IDD : area code: +63 (0)2
- Native languages: Hatang Kayi (Remontado Dumagat); Tagalog
- Major religions: Catholic Church, Evangelical Church, Iglesia ni Cristo
- Feast date: October 7
- Catholic Diocese: Diocese of Antipolo
- Patron saint: Our Lady of the Most Holy Rosary

Rodriguez, officially the Municipality of Rodriguez (Tagalog: Bayan ng Rodriguez), formerly named and still commonly known as Montalban, is a municipality in the province of Rizal, Philippines. According to the 2024 census, it has a population of 451,383 people, making it the most populous municipality in the country.

The town is one of the richest municipalities in the country, ranking third in 2016 with an income of ₱691 million.

== Etymology ==
The municipality's former official name of Montalban derives from the Spanish word monte, which translates to "mountain," in reference to the numerous hills found within and surrounding the town. A common name for the municipality up to the present, it was its official name from its founding in 1871 until 1982 when the Batasang Pambansa officially renamed it to Rodriguez under Batas Pambansa Blg. 275 in honor of Eulogio Rodriguez, a native of the municipality who served as its first municipal president and Philippine Senate president.

== History ==
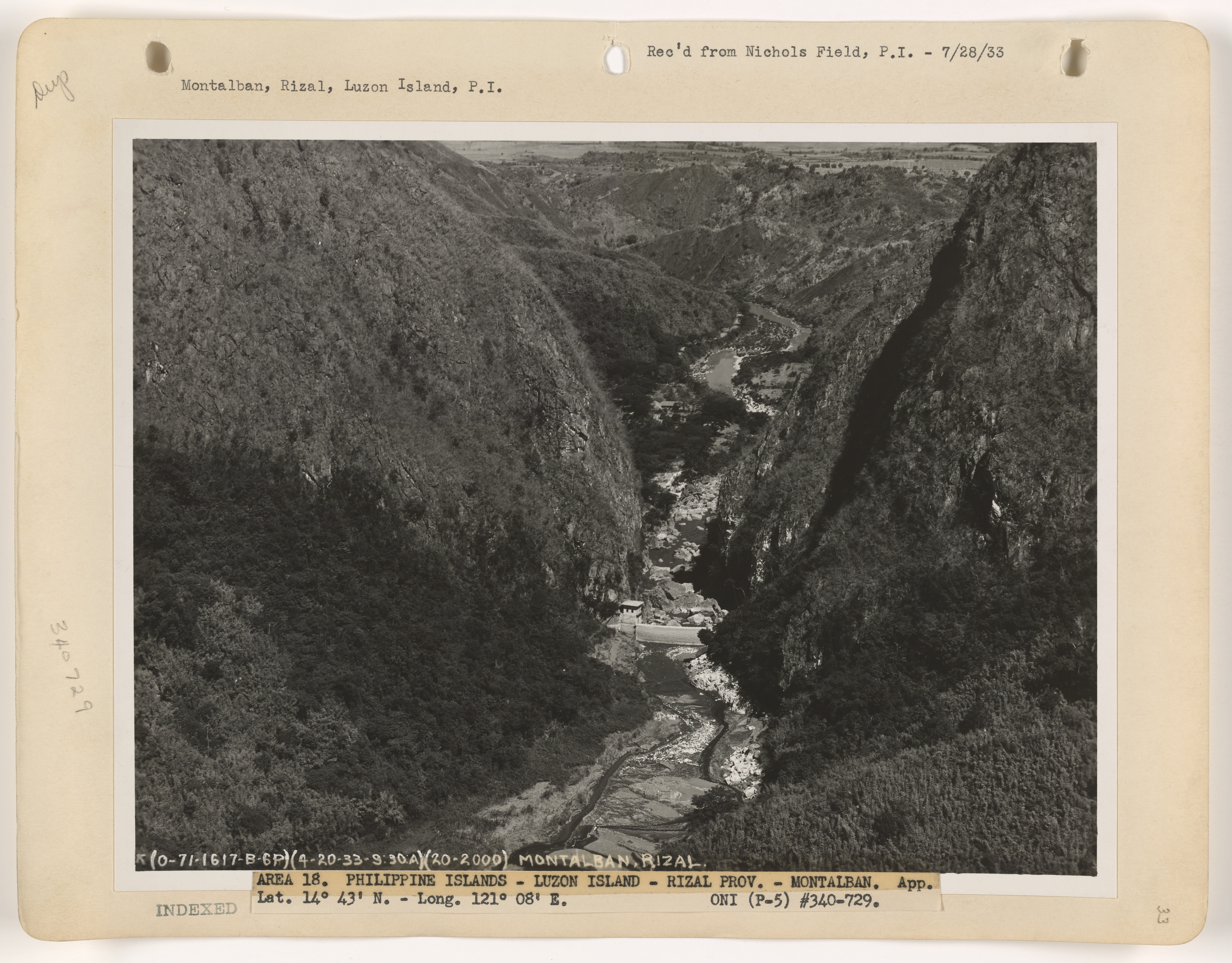
Aerial view of Montalban, circa 1930s

Based on the 1954 journal History and Cultural Life of Montalban and its Barrios, what would then be the town of Montalban was formerly the barrio of Balite under the jurisdiction of San Mateo during the Spanish period. San Mateo, with its large size, was partitioned on April 27, 1871, when Captain General Rafael Izquierdo issued a decree separating the barrios of Balite, Burgos, Marang and Calipahan from San Mateo and formed them into the new municipality of Montalban. The town was then headed by its first parish priest Fr. Eustaquio Infante of Pasig, who led the dedication of the Most Holy Rosary parish church on June 2, 1871, in the term of Gregorio Melitón Martínez as Archbishop of Manila.

According to the Executive Summary included in the Annual Audit Reports of Rodriguez, Rizal, the municipality of Montalban was founded on June 30, 1871, under the Acta de Erección (Deed of Foundation). The town, including its población, was initially part of the Province of Manila, while its present-day mountainous central and eastern portion, according to old maps, was under the jurisdiction of the District of Morong. Additionally, an 1882 Spanish map indicates that the northeastern areas of the present-day municipality were once claimed as part of Bulacan. The municipality was then incorporated to the newly created province of Rizal on June 11, 1901, by virtue of Philippine Commission Act No. 137, after having been a part of the defunct province of Manila.

Montalban was then returned to its mother municipality of San Mateo by virtue of Philippine Commission Act No. 942 on October 12, 1903. San Mateo served as the seat of government in line with the economic centralization. Montalban then separated from San Mateo to become an independent municipality again by virtue of Executive Order No. 20 on February 29, 1908.

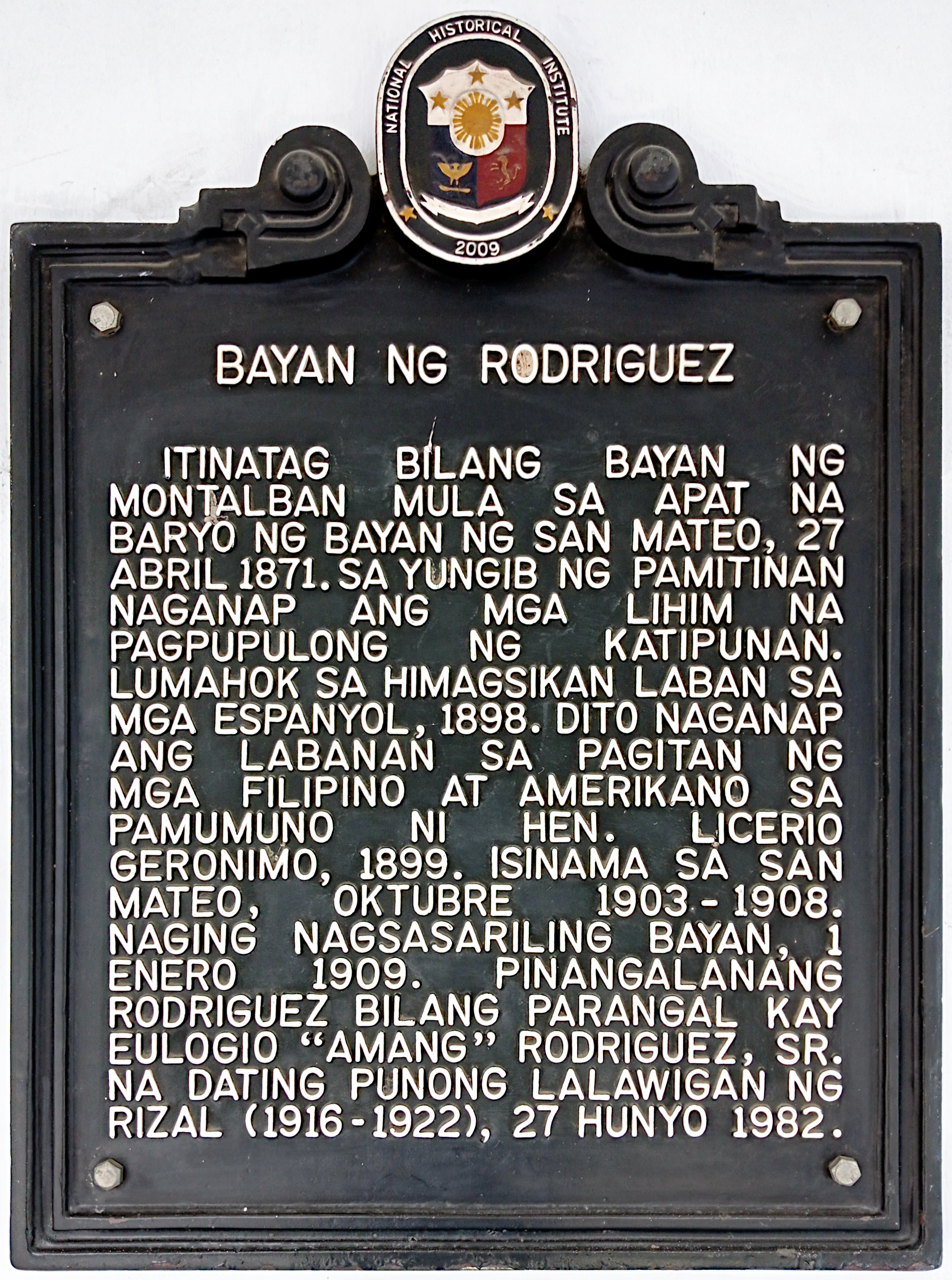
Historical marker installed at the municipal hall in 2009

In 1982, the town was officially renamed to Rodriguez under Batas Pambansa Blg. 275 in honor of the former Senate president and town native Eulogio Rodriguez Sr.

On October 30, 1997, rebels from the New People's Army (NPA), the militant arm of the Communist Party of the Philippines, raided the police station of Rodriguez before noon, ransacking its armoury, killing a police officer, and kidnapping police chief René Francisco. He was later released on December 5, 1997, in Tanay, Rizal.

=== Proposed cityhood ===
As early as 2018, the town's Sangguniang Bayan approved Resolution No. 60, Series of 2018 requesting the Senate of the Philippines through its president, Vicente Sotto III and the House of Representatives through its speaker, Gloria Macapagal Arroyo to co-sponsor a bill for Rodriguez's conversion into a city.

=== Proposed reversion of town name to Montalban ===
Official document from 2020 bearing the town name "Montalban" instead of the official name "Rodriguez".

In mid-to-late 2019, before a formal ruling could be enacted, the municipal government under the term of Mayor Dennis Hernandez began referring to the town as "Montalban".

Notable examples were dropping "Rodriguez" in official documents, office names and correspondences, and the municipal government using a municipal seal with the name "Montalban". In February 2020, another municipal seal that bears the year 1871 as the date of establishment was used.

In April 2020, the municipality celebrated its 149th Foundation Day (Araw ng Montalban); in the previous year April 2019, at the time when 1909 was still the recognized date of establishment, the municipality celebrated its 110th founding anniversary.

In response to the numerous requests from the town's native residents to return the town to its former name, on July 3, 2019, during the 18th Congress, Rizal's 2nd District Representative Juan Fidel Nograles filed House Bill No. 337. The bill was later substituted by HB No. 8899 filed March 5, 2021; it was approved by the House of Representatives on March 17 and was received by the Senate on March 27. It was introduced by Senator Imee Marcos under Senate Bill No. 2258 on June 1.

In the Senate hearing of the Committee on Local Government on January 21, 2022, the National Historical Commission of the Philippines did not pose any objection on the proposed measure and clarified that the proposed change will only apply to the municipality's name; structures and other features such as buildings, schools in the municipality dedicated in memory of Rodriguez are not covered by the proposed bill and should be retained.

With further minor amendments, the bill was approved on third and final reading on January 31. The House adopted the Senate amendment and the bill was submitted to the President for his signature.

On June 2, 2022, Republic Act No. 11812, the act reverting the town's name to Montalban and repealing Batas Pambansa Blg. 275 had lapsed into law. A plebiscite, having no set date, is to be supervised by the Commission on Elections.

== Geography ==
Rodriguez is a town of mountains. It is located on the slopes of the Sierra Madre mountain range. From its north to south, a series of sloping ridges, hills and mountains ranges adorn the town. In fact, around 27% of the town is occupied by mountains and slopes. The town's highest peak is Mount Irid, 1,469 meters (4,820 ft) above sea level.

Rodriguez makes up 26.23% of the 1,191.94-square-kilometer (460.21 sq mi) total area of Rizal. Making it the largest town in Rizal province with an area of 312.70 square kilometers (120.73 square miles). The municipality borders San Mateo and Antipolo, Rizal on the south, Norzagaray and San Jose del Monte, Bulacan on the north, Quezon City and Caloocan on the west, General Nakar, Quezon on the east, and Tanay on the south-east. Rodriguez's economic activities include agriculture and commerce such as the Avilon Zoo.

Rodriguez is the northernmost town in the province and comes after San Mateo, Rizal, and Quezon City coming from Metro Manila. It is also the location of the Montalban Gorge that is associated with the Legend of Bernardo Carpio. The gorge forms part of a protected area known as the Pamitinan Protected Landscape.

=== Elevation and slope ===
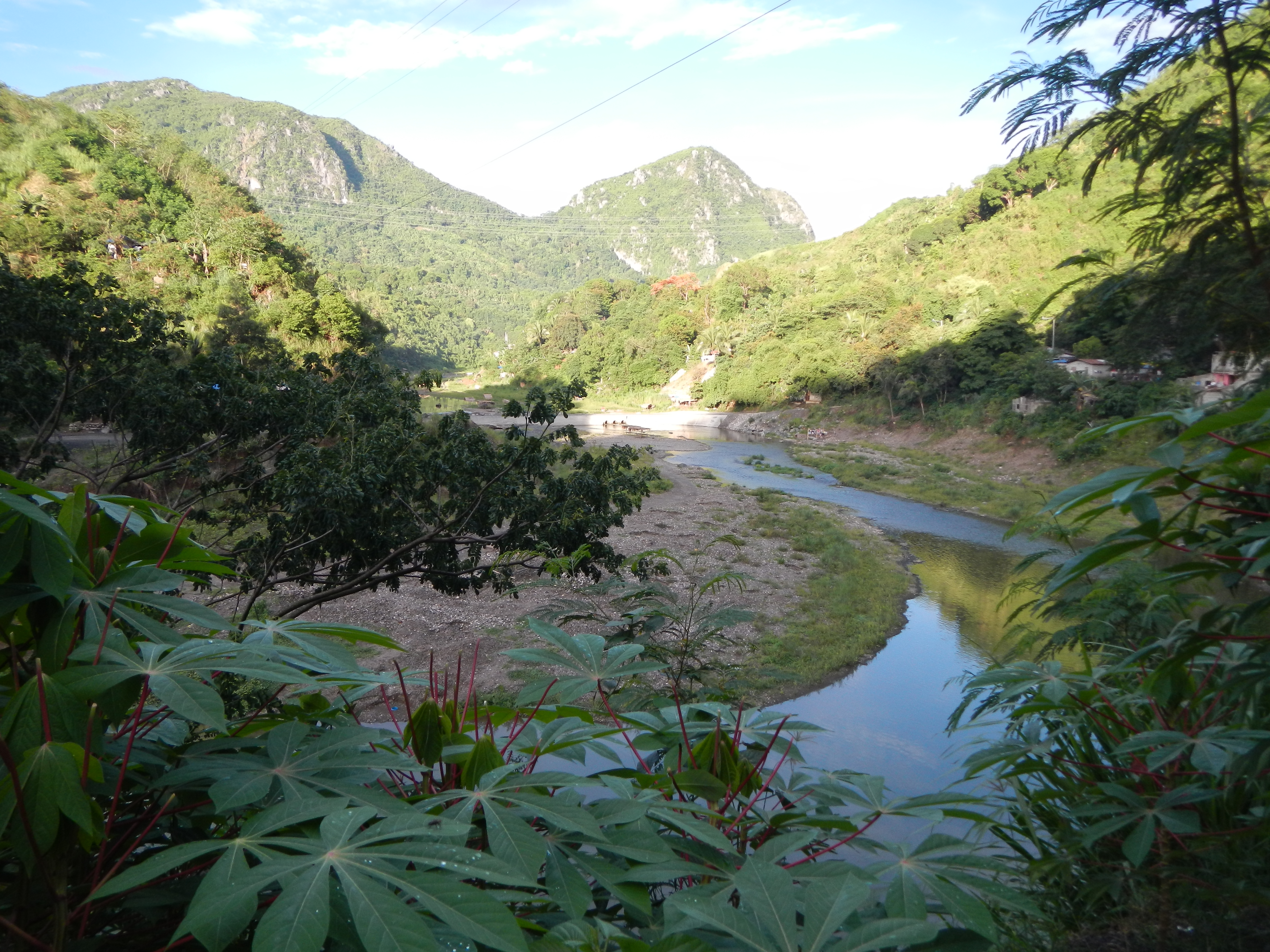
The mountainous interior of Rodriguez

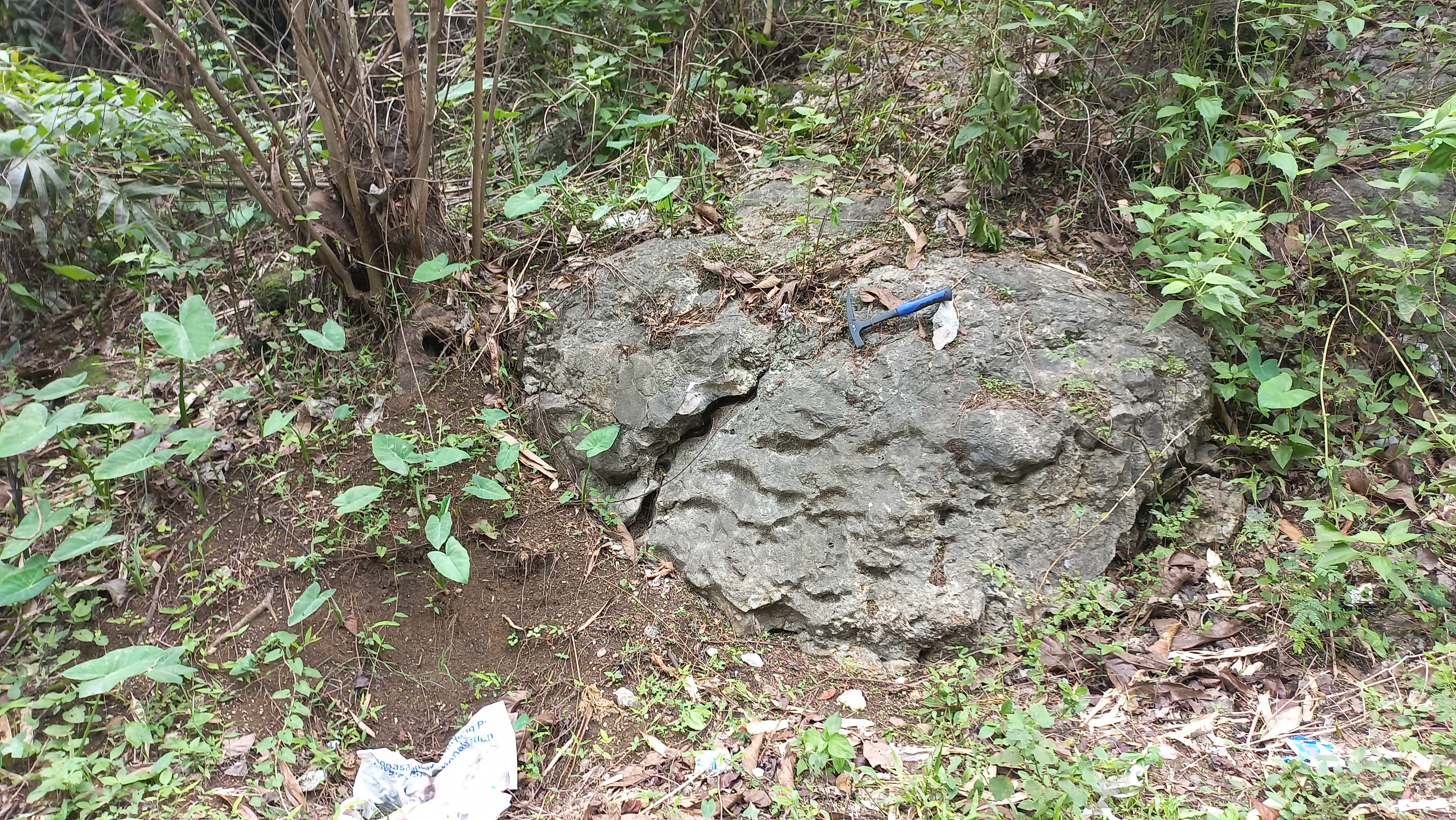
Coralline limestone along the Mascap-Puray Road

Rodriguez is generally very rough in topography, with 83% of its total land area composed of upland areas, hills and mountain ranges. The remaining 17% low-lying terrain and rolling lands are found at the south-western portion of the municipality, along with the northern portions of the Municipality of San Mateo.

The rolling slopes comprise the Marikina River Valley, where water from higher elevations drain towards the Marikina River and its tributaries at the south-western portion of the municipality. Elevations at these western lowlands range from 10 to 30 meters (33 to 98 ft) above sea level. The western portion of the flatlands gently rises towards the west, which is part of Quezon City.

The mountainous regions of Rodriguez are found at the central and eastern areas, with sleepy sloping ridges and mountain ranges, traversing north to south. The terrain in these mountain ranges has slopes ranging from 30 to 50%. Very steep hills and mountains have slopes greater than 50%. Rolling to hilly areas 18–30% in slope can also be found. These high elevations are drained by the Tanay, Puray, and Rodriguez Rivers.

== Demographics ==
Population census of Rodriguez
Year	Pop.	±% p.a.
1903	3,440	—
1918	5,201	+2.79%
1939	6,402	+0.99%
1948	5,257	−2.17%
1960	9,648	+5.19%
1970	20,882	+8.02%
1975	31,176	+8.37%
1980	41,859	+6.07%
1990	67,074	+4.83%
1995	79,668	+3.28%
2000	115,167	+8.22%
2007	223,594	+9.58%
2010	280,904	+8.66%
2015	369,222	+5.34%
2020	443,954	+3.96%
2024	451,383	+0.40%
Source: Philippine Statistics Authority

=== Barangays ===
|

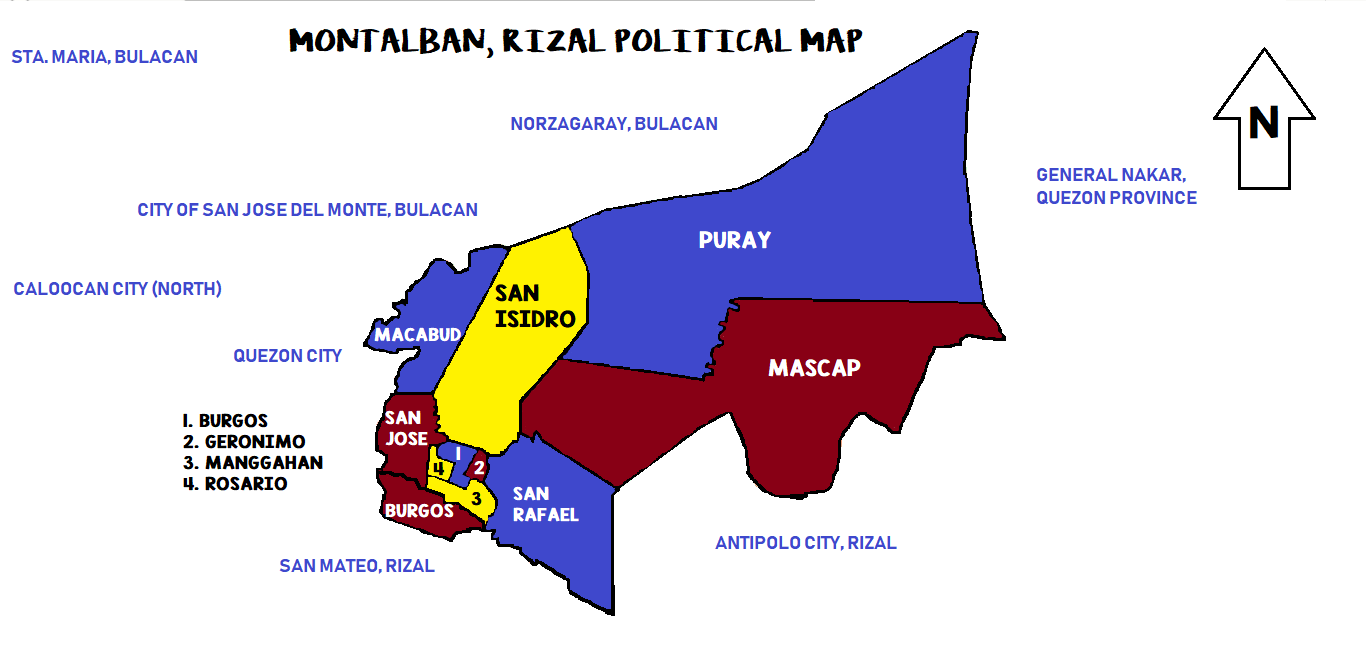
Map of Rodriguez (Montalban) Rizal and its Barangays. This is subject to the correction by Rodriguez LGU.

Rodriguez is politically subdivided into 11 barangays (8 urban, 3 rural), as indicated below and in the image herein. Each barangay consists of puroks and some have sitios.

The barangays of San Isidro and San Jose are two of the most populated barangays in the Philippines.

Barangay	Population (2024 census)
Balite	8,302
Burgos	50,396
Geronimo	6,829
Macabud	10,657
Manggahan	18,394
Mascap	5,436
Puray	3,683
Rosario	6,521
San Isidro	164,822
San Jose	143,031
San Rafael	33,312
Rodriguez	451,383

In the 2020 census, the population of Rodriguez, Rizal, was 443,954 people, with a density of 1,400 inhabitants per square kilometer or 3,600 inhabitants per square mile.

== Climate ==
Climate data for Rodriguez, Rizal
Month	Jan	Feb	Mar	Apr	May	Jun	Jul	Aug	Sep	Oct	Nov	Dec	Year
Mean daily maximum °C (°F)	26 (79)	27 (81)	28 (82)	31 (88)	31 (88)	30 (86)	29 (84)	29 (84)	29 (84)	29 (84)	28 (82)	27 (81)	29 (84)
Mean daily minimum °C (°F)	22 (72)	22 (72)	22 (72)	23 (73)	25 (77)	25 (77)	25 (77)	25 (77)	24 (75)	24 (75)	23 (73)	22 (72)	24 (74)
Average precipitation mm (inches)	40 (1.6)	33 (1.3)	35 (1.4)	38 (1.5)	138 (5.4)	190 (7.5)	242 (9.5)	216 (8.5)	224 (8.8)	200 (7.9)	114 (4.5)	94 (3.7)	1,564 (61.6)
Average rainy days	12.2	9.0	11.0	11.7	21.5	24.0	27.2	26.1	26.8	22.3	16.3	15.1	223.2
Source: Meteoblue

== Economy ==
Poverty incidence of Rodriguez (%)

Source: Philippine Statistics Authority

== Transportation ==
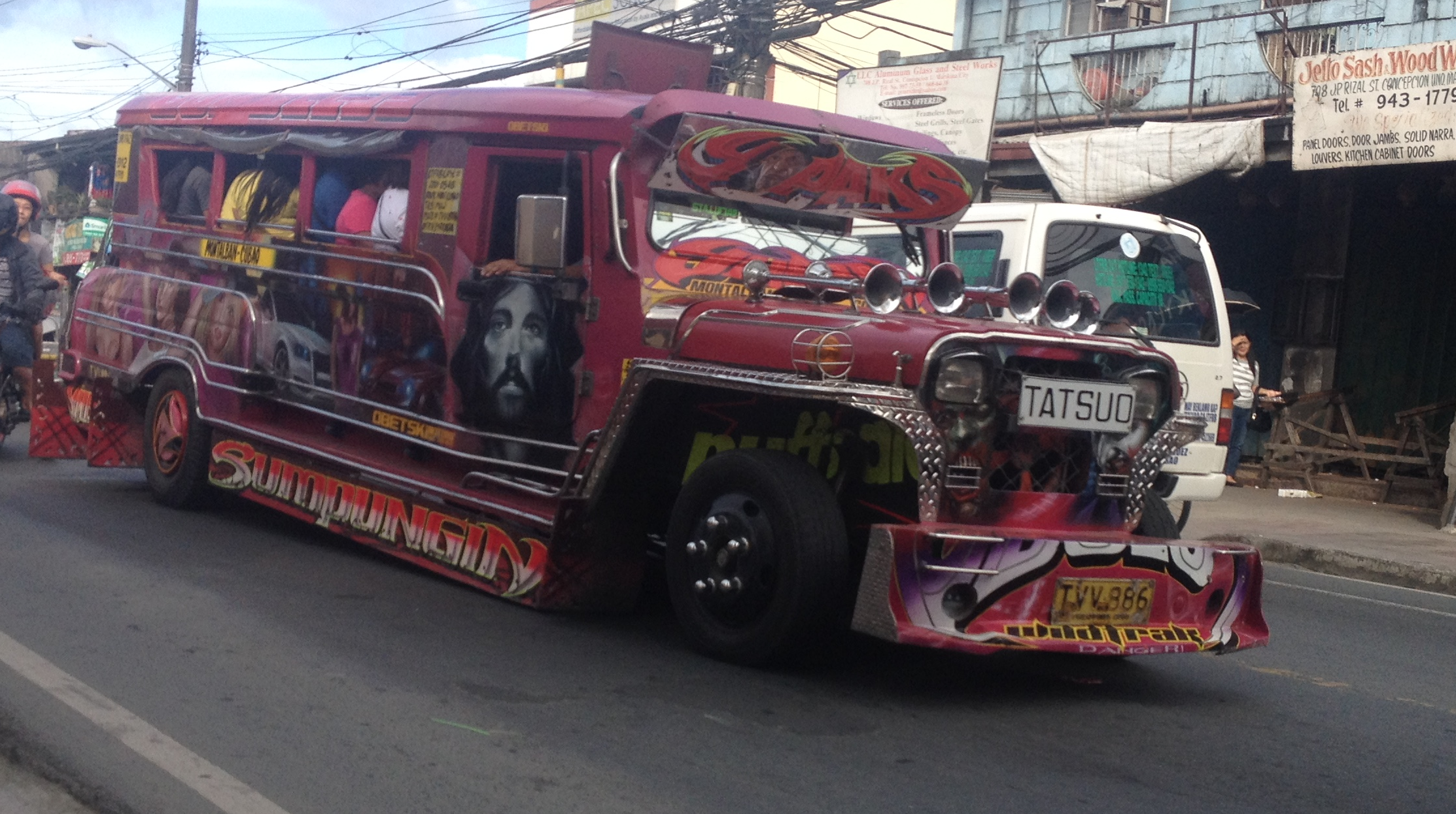
A patok jeepney plying the route of Montalban - Cubao. They are known for booming music, bright lights and colorful and artistic designs.

The main transportation used in the municipality are jeepneys, tricycles, UV Express, and buses. There are jeepneys that ply through the towns of San Mateo, Marikina and Cubao in Quezon City via Marcos Highway, while some ply the route that leads to Philcoa in Quezon City via Batasan Road in San Mateo, others connect Rodriguez to Litex Road in Quezon City. UV Express vehicles ply the routes to Cubao in Quezon City and Santa Lucia Grand Mall in Cainta. During the 2010s, there were additional UV Express vehicles that serve the routes to North EDSA in Quezon City and Quiapo in Manila, and the route to Cubao operates via Marikina and via Payatas Road.

Formerly, there was railway service under the Manila Railroad Company that traversed the San Mateo, Marikina, and Pasig areas and had its terminus at Barangay Balitè behind the Santo Rosario Parish Church. It had been long dismantled and the railway line converted into roadway that now consists of the road aptly named Daang Bakal.

It is known that 'patok' jeepneys originated from this town way back during the 1980s. These jeepneys are known for their notoriety on the road. Despite this, they are popular among the passengers hence the name patók which means 'popular'. They still ply this town up to this day, most plying the Montalban-Cubao route via Marcos Highway. These jeepneys have already spread throughout the Rizal province as well as in Marikina since then.

The Marikina Auto Line Transport Corporation (MALTC) buses is the only one that regularly travels to farther places like Makati and Parañaque. However, during the COVID-19 pandemic, the Land Transportation Franchising and Regulatory Board (LTFRB) implemented a route rationalization system for city buses. Currently, a city bus route connects Montalban with the capital city of Manila and Parañaque Integrated Terminal Exchange.

The proposed San Mateo Railway will connect the municipality of Rodriguez to the Light Rail Transit Line 2, in which 6 stations are in development.

== Government ==
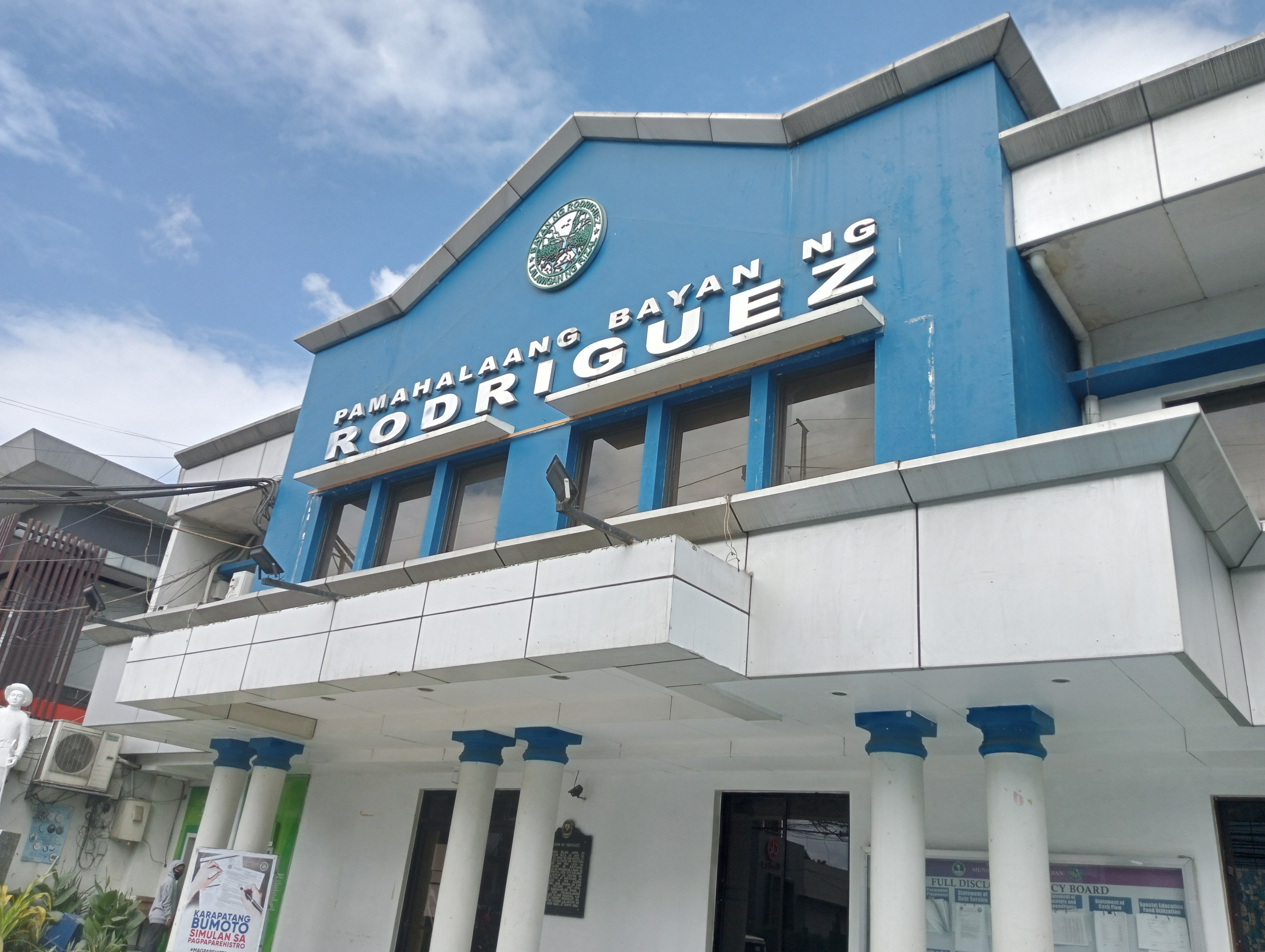
Rodriguez Municipal Hall

=== List of former chief executives ===
Indicates a municipal president.
Indicates a mayoral term during the Japanese Occupation

N^{o}	Entered office	Exited office	Name
1	1909	1916	Eulogio Rodriguez
2	1916	1919	Eusebio Manuel
3	1919	1928	Gregorio Bautista
4	1928	1932	Jose Rodriguez
5	1932	1936	Roman Reyes
6	1936	1940	Jacinto Bautista
7	1940	1942	Francisco Rodriguez
8	1942	1944	Federico San Juan
9	1944	1945	Felix Salen
10	1945	1945	Gavino Cruz
11	1945	1946	Francisco Rodriguez
12	1946	1947	Catalino Bautista
13	1947	1947	Macario Bautista
14	1947	1959	Benigno Liamzon
15	1959	1959	Guillermo Cruz Sr.
16	1959	1984	Teodoro Rodriguez
17	1984	1987	Pablo Adriano
18	1988	1993	Angelito Manuel
19	1993	1995	Ernesto Villanueva
20	1995	1998	Pedro Cuerpo
21	1998	2001	Rafaelito San Diego
22	2001	2010	Pedro Cuerpo
23	2010	2019	Cecilio Hernandez
24	2019	2022	Dennis Hernandez
25	2022	Incumbent	Ronnie Evangelista

== Hospitals ==
- H Vill Hospital
- Montalban Infirmary
- Casimiro A. Ynares Sr. Memorial Hospital
- Northern Tagalog Regional Hospital (under construction)

== Education ==
There are two schools district offices which govern all educational institutions within the municipality. They oversee the management and operations of all private and public, from primary to secondary schools. These are the Rodriguez I Schools District, and Rodriguez II Schools District.

There are numerous elementary and high schools, both public and private, offering primary, secondary and tertiary education in the town of Rodriguez. There are also colleges and institutions that offer undergraduate and graduate programs in town.

=== Primary and elementary schools ===
- Abelard Integrated School
- Amityville Elementary School
- Angeli Gilbert Christian Academy
- Balagbag Elementary School
- Basecamp Elementary School
- Blossomland Preparatory Christian School
- Bridgeview Learning Center for Children
- Burgos Elementary School
- Burgos Elementary School (Unit I)
- Catmon Elementary School
- Center for Positive Futures (Balite)
- Children's Mission Philippines Hills of Grace Foundation
- Cinco's Learning Center (Espiritu Subdivision)
- Cinco's Learning Center (Villa Anna Maria)
- Christ the Foundation Christian Academy
- Christian Family Centre School Foundation
- Creative Steps Preschool
- Divine Saviour Montessori School
- Domus Angeli Academy (Eastwood)
- Domus Angeli Academy (Greenbreeze)
- EBBC Christian Academy
- Educational Values and Character Child Development Center
- Emmanuel Child Development Center
- Eul-Shalom Learning Center
- Eulogio Rodriguez Jr. Elementary School
- Faith Christian Academy
- Faith in God Christian School
- FASC Creative Learning School
- FIAT Center for Global Learners
- Frames of Mind School
- Gain Christian Academy
- GATC Integrated School for Kindergarten
- Gen. Licerio Geronimo National High School
- Gentle Kiddie Learning Academy
- Geronimo Elementary School
- Great Goal Learning Center
- Great Start Children's Development School
- Greenfield Academy of Eastwood
- Hosea Christian Mission School
- Infant Jesus Learning Academy
- Iñigan Elementary School
- Jolly Children Academic Center
- Joyful Child of Caren School
- Joyful Star 8 Educational Center
- Kasiglahan Village Elementary School
- Kasiglahan Village Elementary School (Unit I)
- Keen for Immersion Development Learning Center
- Kiddielamp Learning Center
- Kids Ladder Christian Academy
- Kids with a Vision Learning Center
- Le Mara Learning Academy
- Light of Hope Christian Learning Center
- Little Guardian Learning Center
- LJSC Montessori School
- Louisian Learning Academy
- Macabud Elementary School
- Macaingalan Elementary School
- Malasya Uyungan Elementary School
- Manggahan Elementary School
- Maranatha Christian Academy (Greenbreeze)
- Maranatha Christian Academy (Kasiglahan)
- Maranatha Christian Academy (Rizal Ave.)
- Mascap Elementary School
- Mascap Elementary School - Magalipit Elementary School
- Me and J Learning Center
- MelvinShire School
- Mizrachs Learning School
- MVW Tutorial Learning Center
- Ob Christian Community School
- Our Lord Redeemer Academy
- Papaya Academy
- Precious Little Lights Academy
- Productive Learners Christian Academy
- Puray Elementary School
- Raphael Archangel School
- RCAC Educational Institute
- Rodriguez Heights ES
- Rural Improvement Club Children Center (Ramos St.)
- Rural Improvement Club Children Center (Rizal St.)
- Rural Improvement Club Children Center (Summit View)
- San Isidro Grace Christian School
- San Isidro Elementary School
- San Isidro Labrador Elementary School
- San Jose Elementary School
- San Rafael Elementary School
- San Rafael Elementary School (Casili Elementary School)
- Southville 8 Elementary School
- Southville 8C Elementary School
- St. Anne Child Study Center
- St. Anthony Learning Institute of Quezon City
- St. Edith Academy
- St. Joseph Christian Academy
- St. Josue Children Learning Center
- St. Margarette Integrated Learning School
- St. Mary Magdalene Academy
- St. Mary's School of Novaliches
- St. Nazareth Learning Center
- Steps to Ladders School and Activity Center
- Tagumpay Elementary School
- The Cradle Top Learning School
- The Eastbridge School
- The Living Epistle Christian Academy
- Thrones Rainbow Angel Workshop
- Wawa Elementary School
- Whole Brain School
- Wise Steward Christian School
- Valley High Academy
- Victoriouz Kids Academy
- Virgen del Pilar School

=== Secondary schools ===
- Burgos National High School
- Eastern Valley High, Inc. - Rodriguez
- Eastwood Integrated School
- Kasiglahan Village National High School
- Kasiglahan Village Senior High School
- Macabud National High School
- Macaingalan High School
- Manggahan National High School
- Mascap National High School
- Mascap National High School (Puray Annex)
- Montalban Heights National High School
- San Isidro National High School
- San Isidro Senior High School
- San Jose National High School
- San Jose Litex Senior High School
- Southville 8B National High School
- Southville 8B Senior High School
- Southville 8C National High School
- Standalone Senior High School 5
- Tagumpay National High School
- Wawa National High School
- Westbridge Institute of Technology, Inc. - Amityville Campus
- Westbridge Institute of Technology, Inc. - Balite Campus

=== Higher educational institutions ===
- Asian Institute of Computer Studies - Montalban Campus
- Colegio de Montalban
- College of Arts and Sciences of Asia and the Pacific
- Frobelian College of Science & Technology
- FEU Roosevelt Rodriguez
- St. Joseph College
- University of Rizal System - Rodriguez Campus

== Tourism ==
- Pamitinan Protected Landscape
- Wawa Dam
- Puray Falls
- Rodriguez Ancestral Mansion
- Mount Pamitinan and Binacayan
- Mount Hapunang Banoi
- Mount Sipit-Ulang
- Avilon Zoo
- Espadang Bato

== Gallery ==
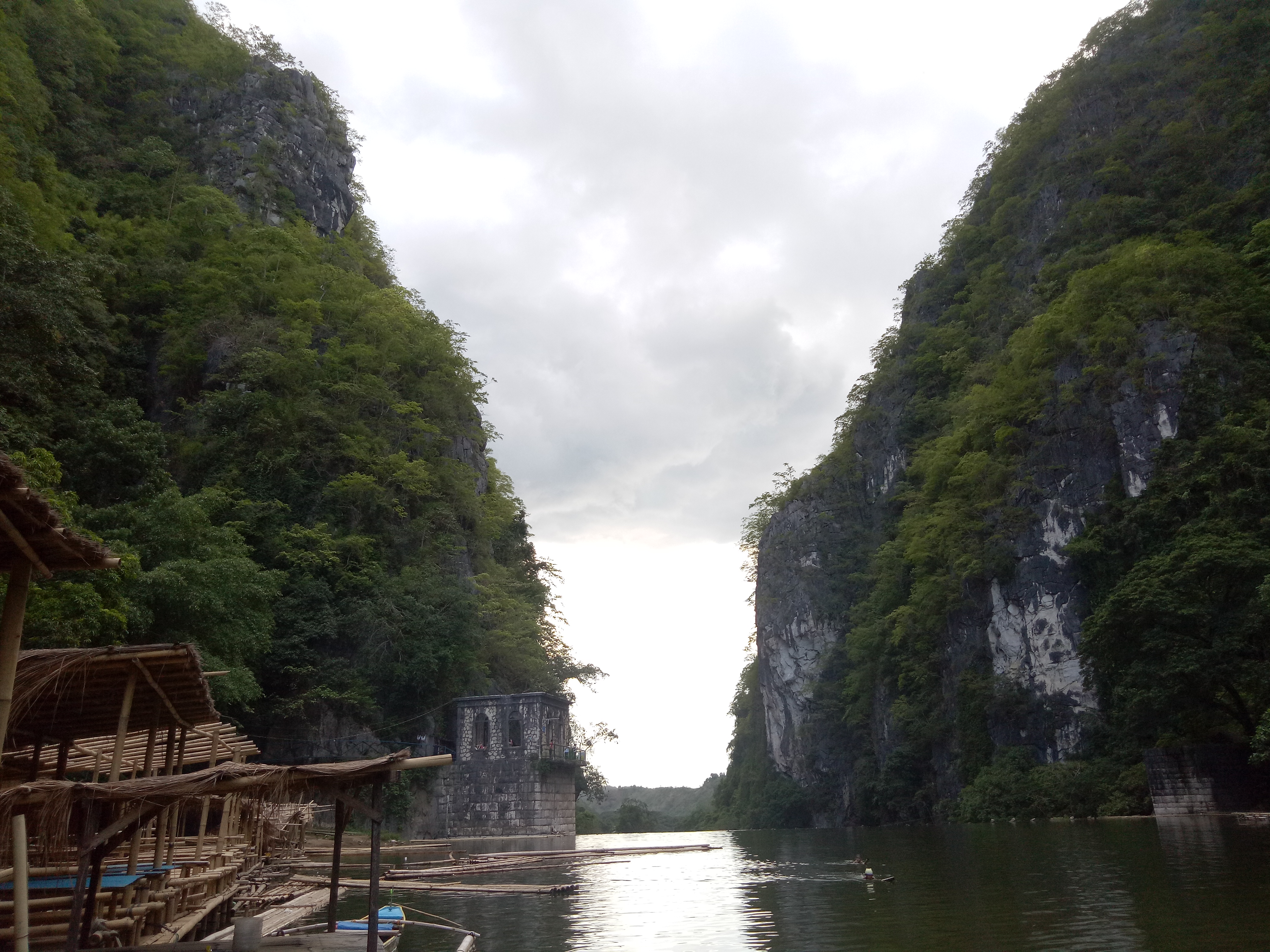
Montalban Gorge (Pamitinan Protected Landscape)

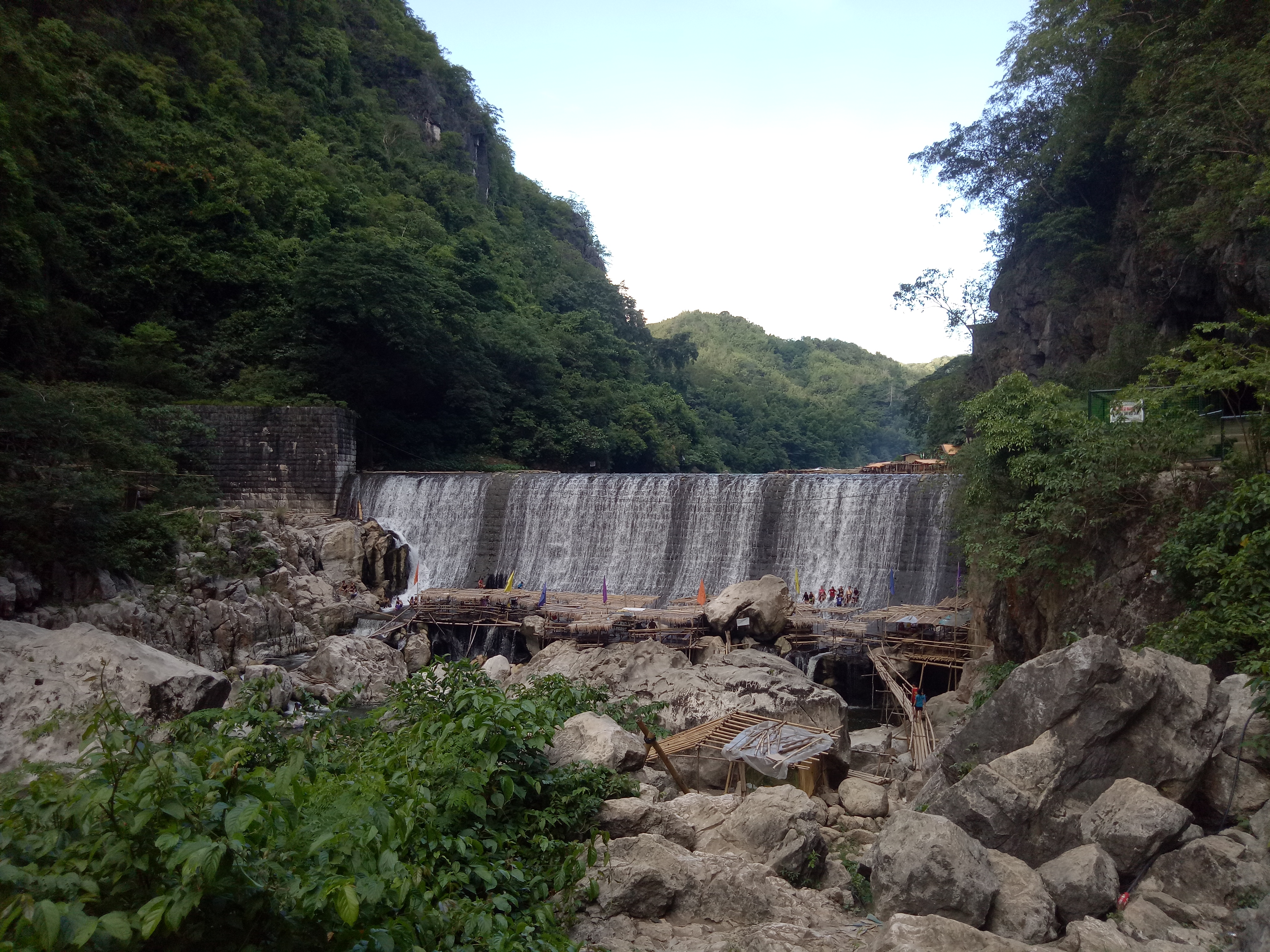
Wawa Dam

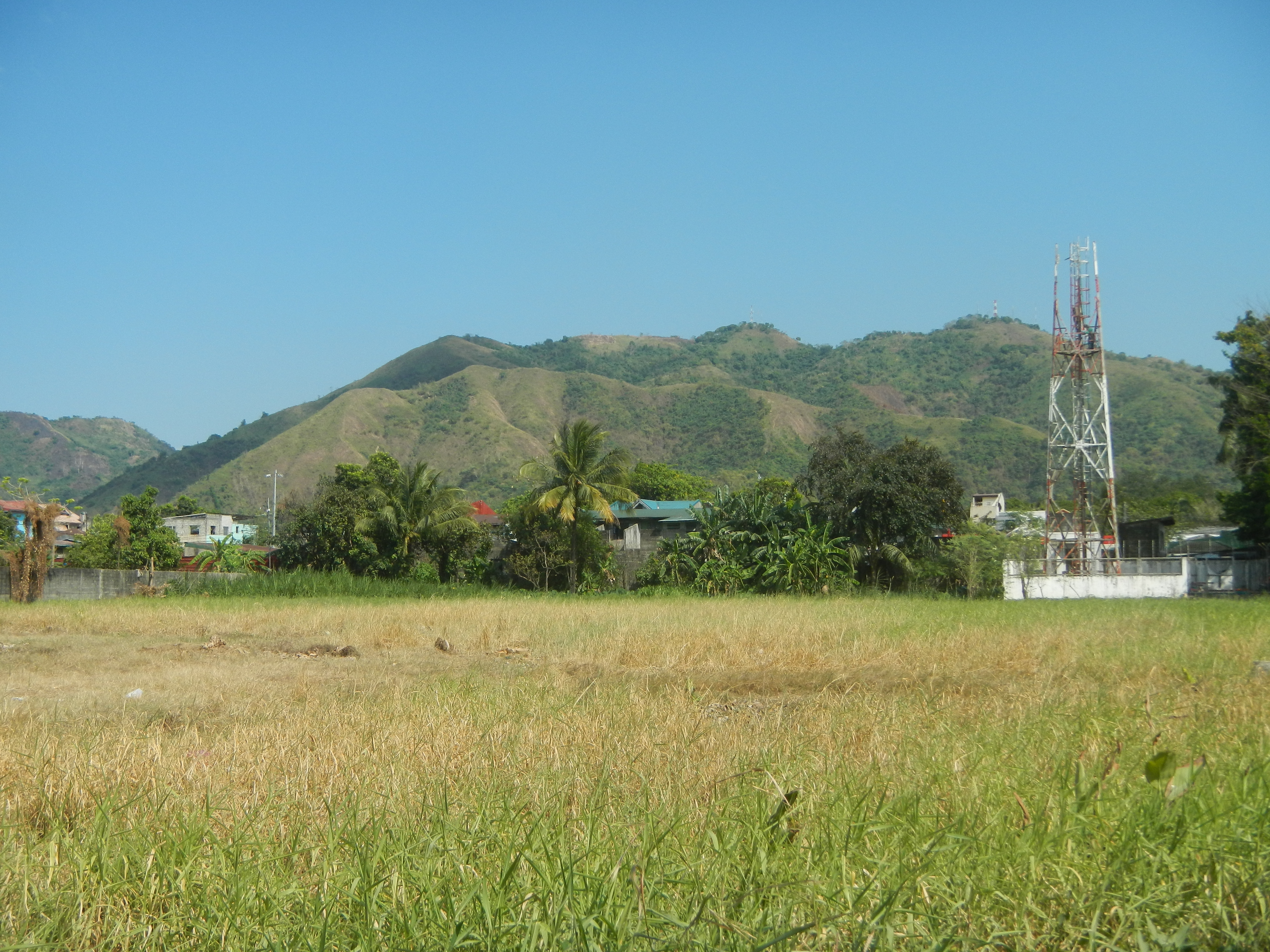
Mount Mataba, one of the rolling hills in the Marikina Valley

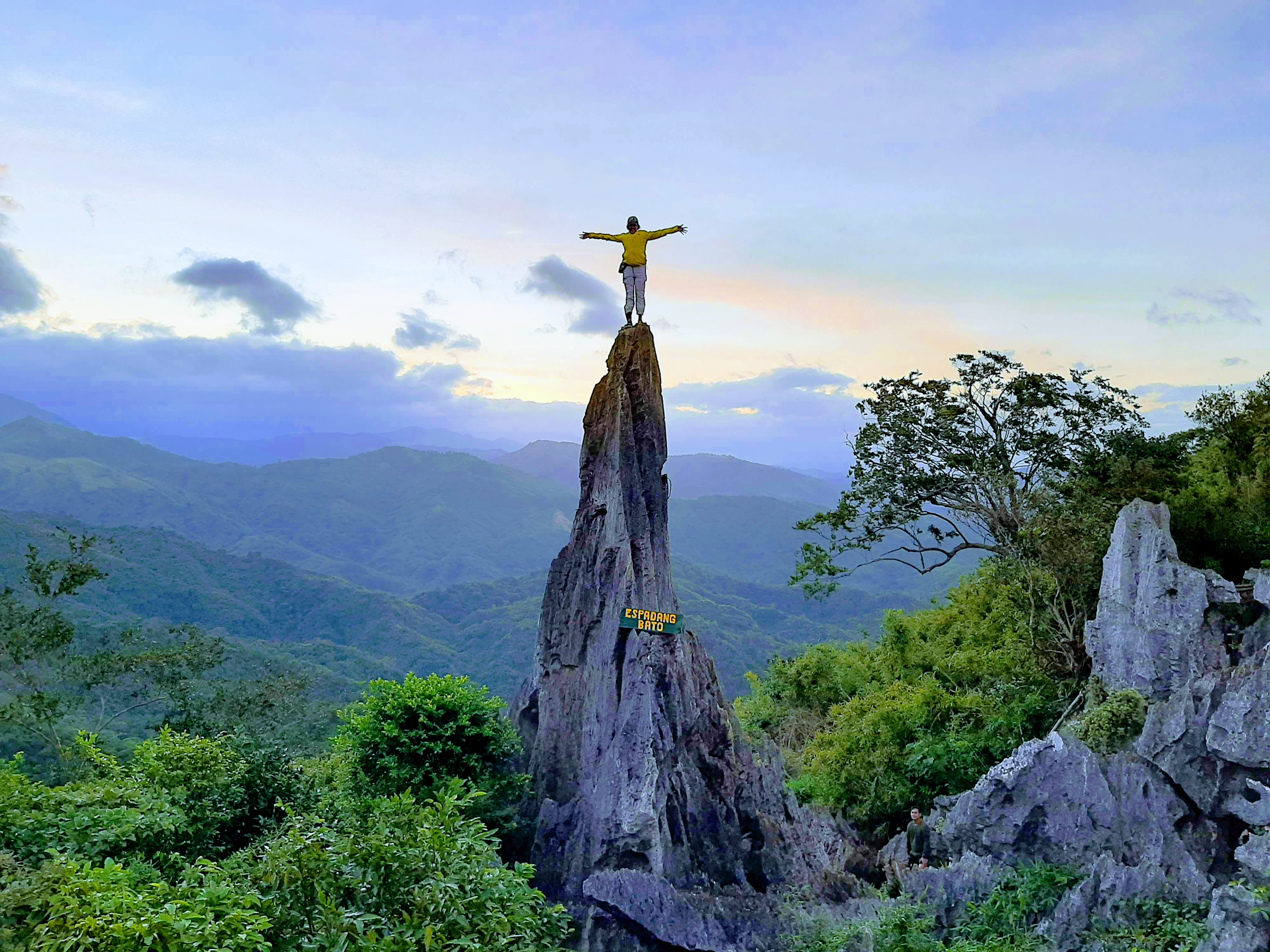
Espadang Bato

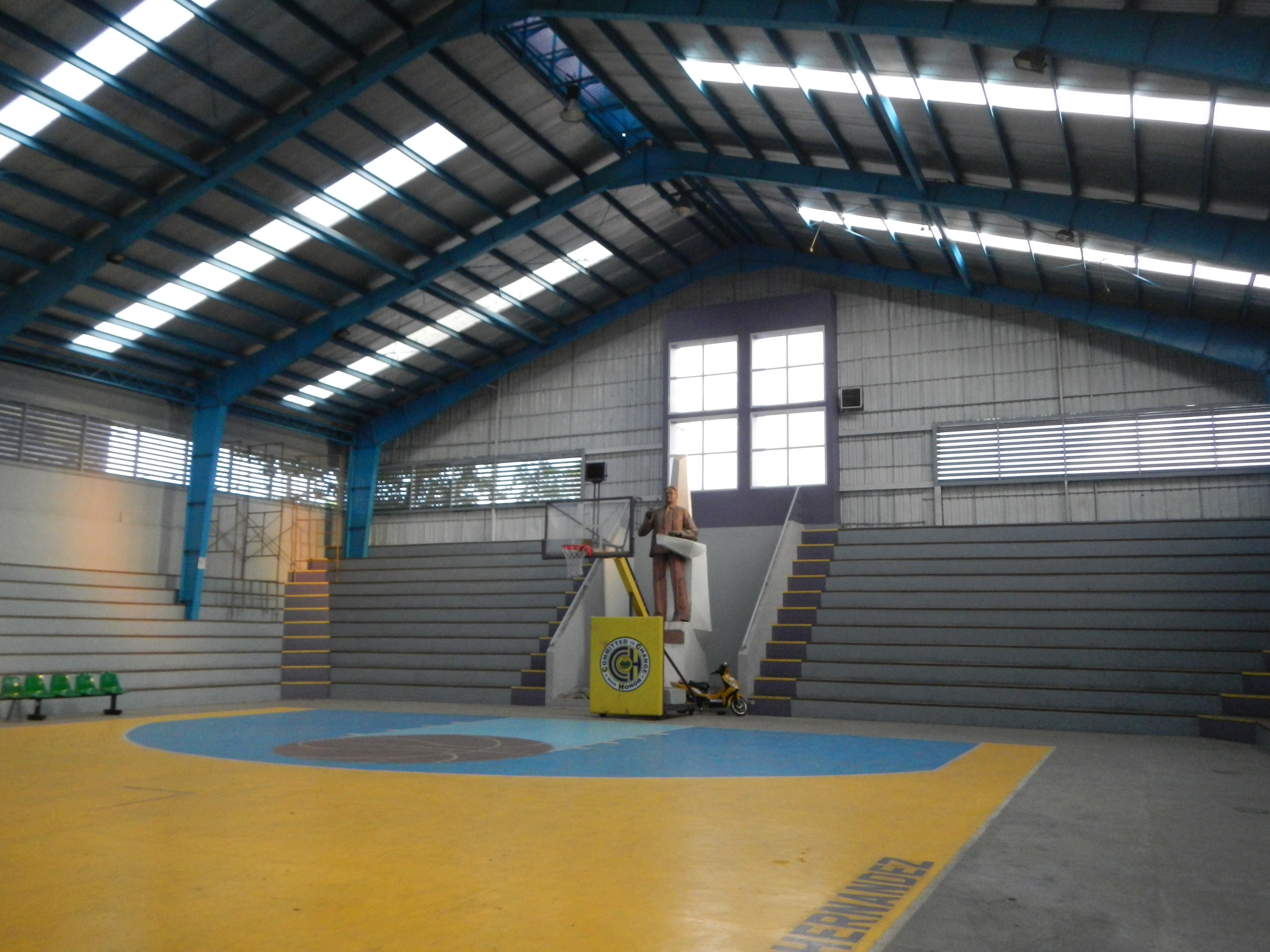
Rodriguez Municipal Gymnasium

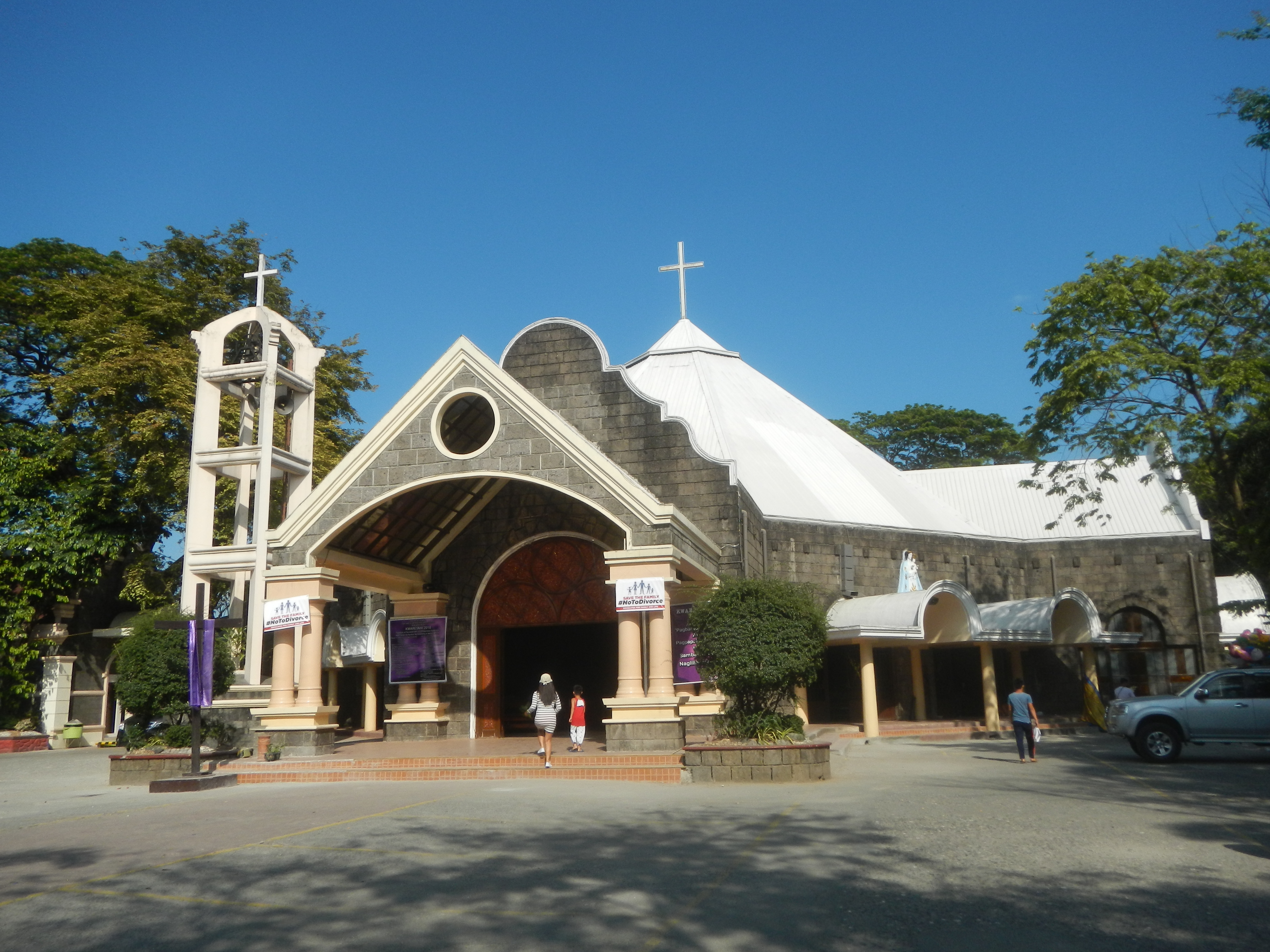
Nuestra Señora del Santísimo Rosario Parish Church

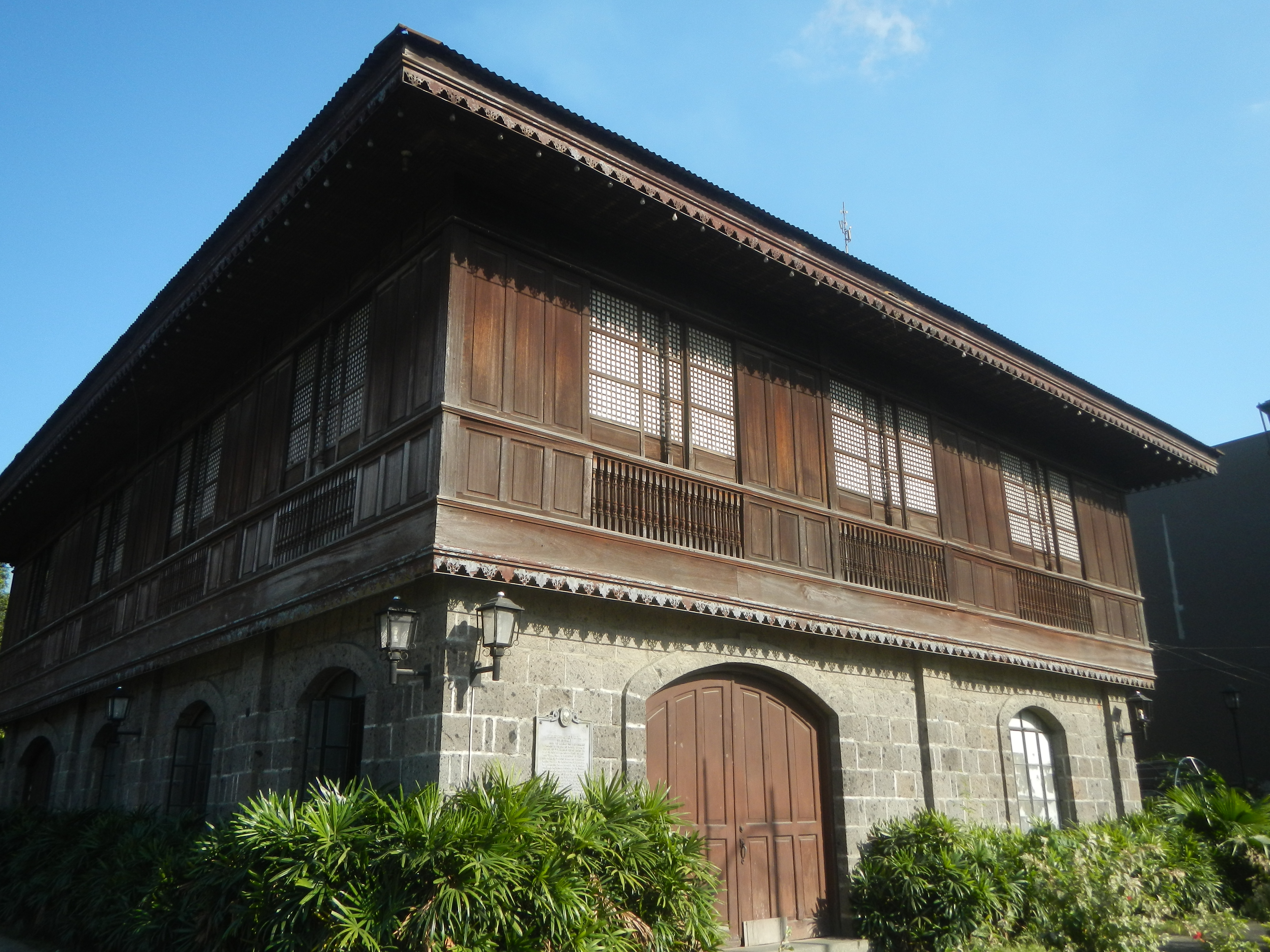
Rodriguez Ancestral House

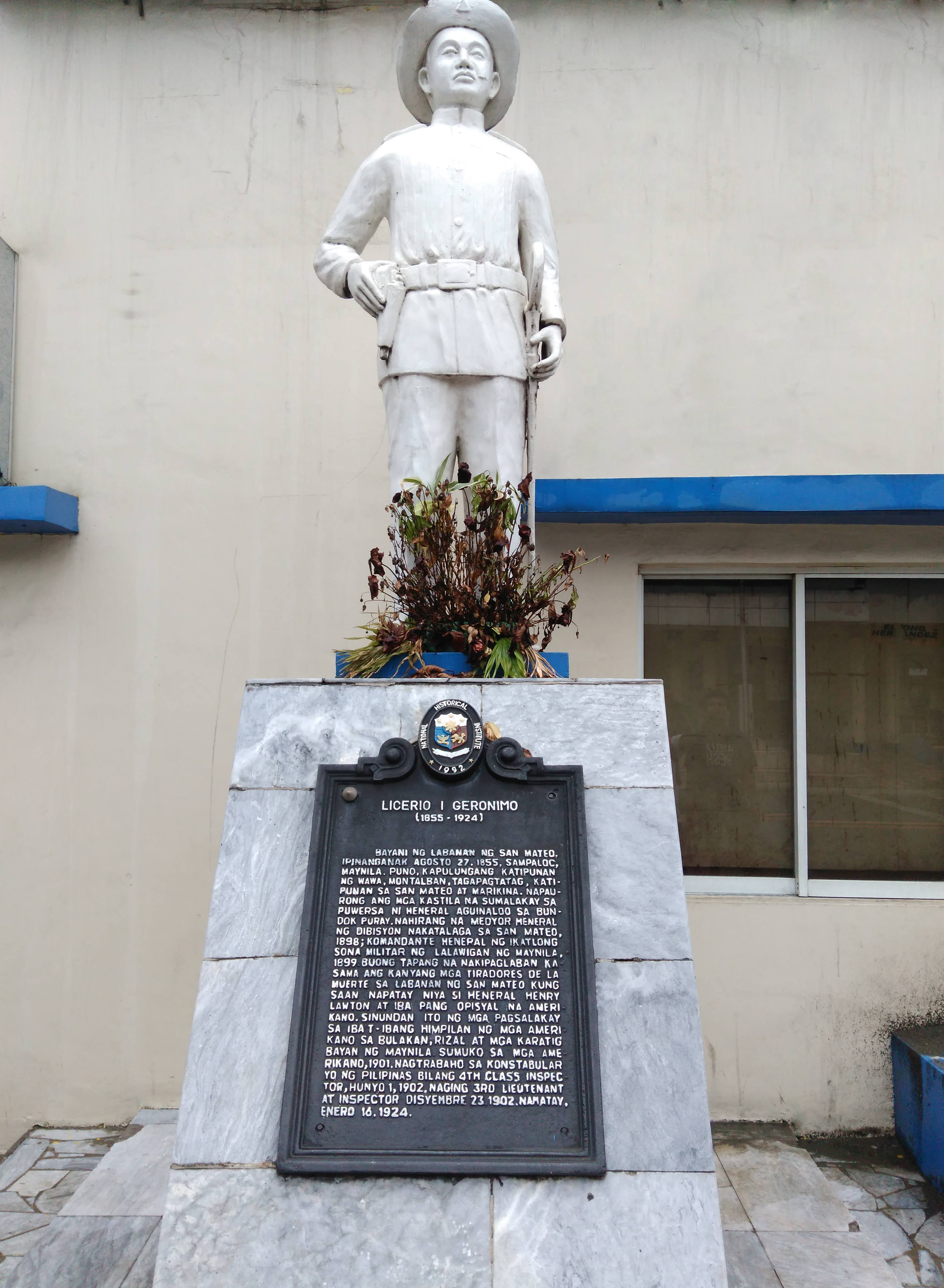
Licerio Geronimo Memorial

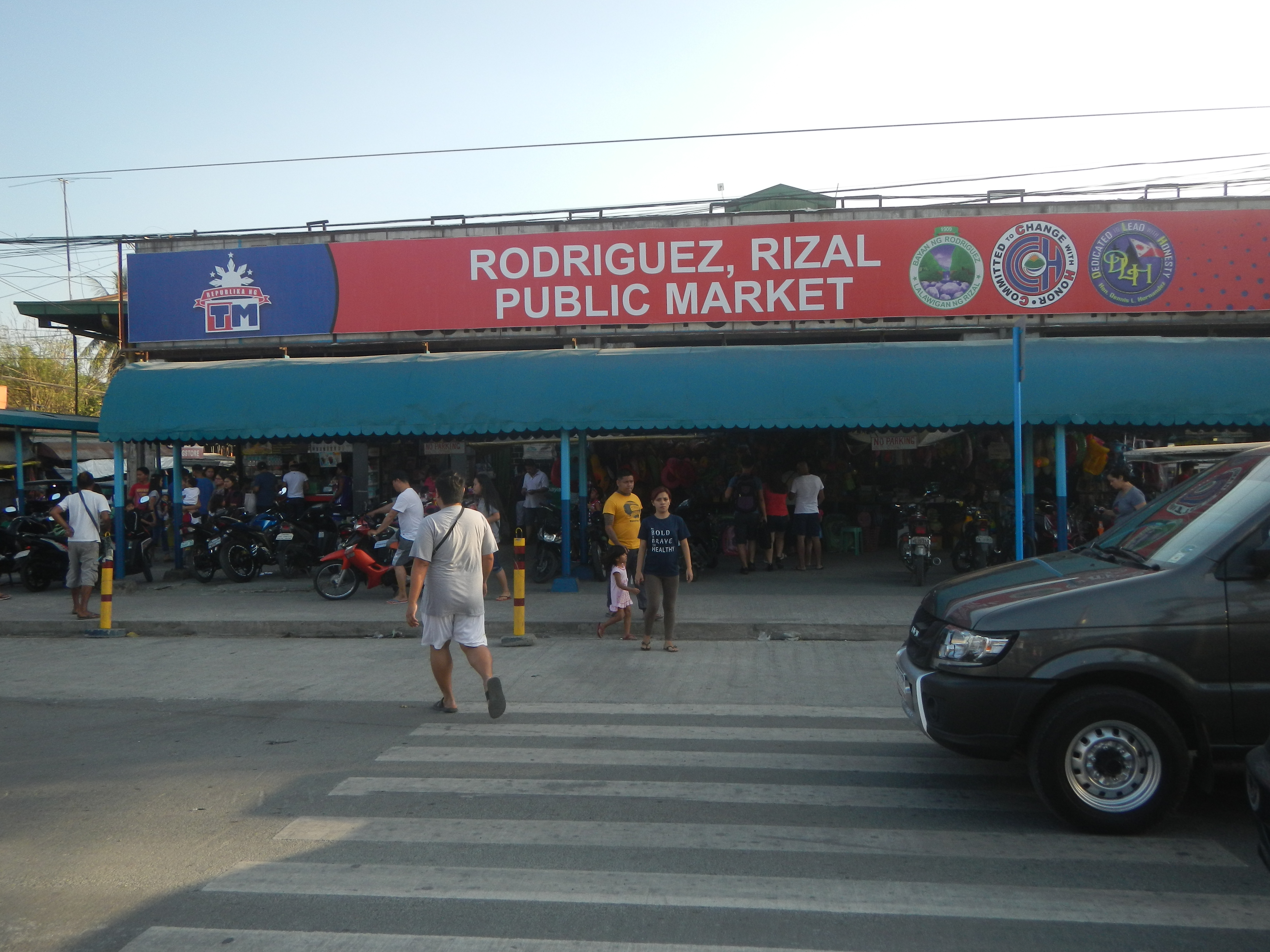
Public market

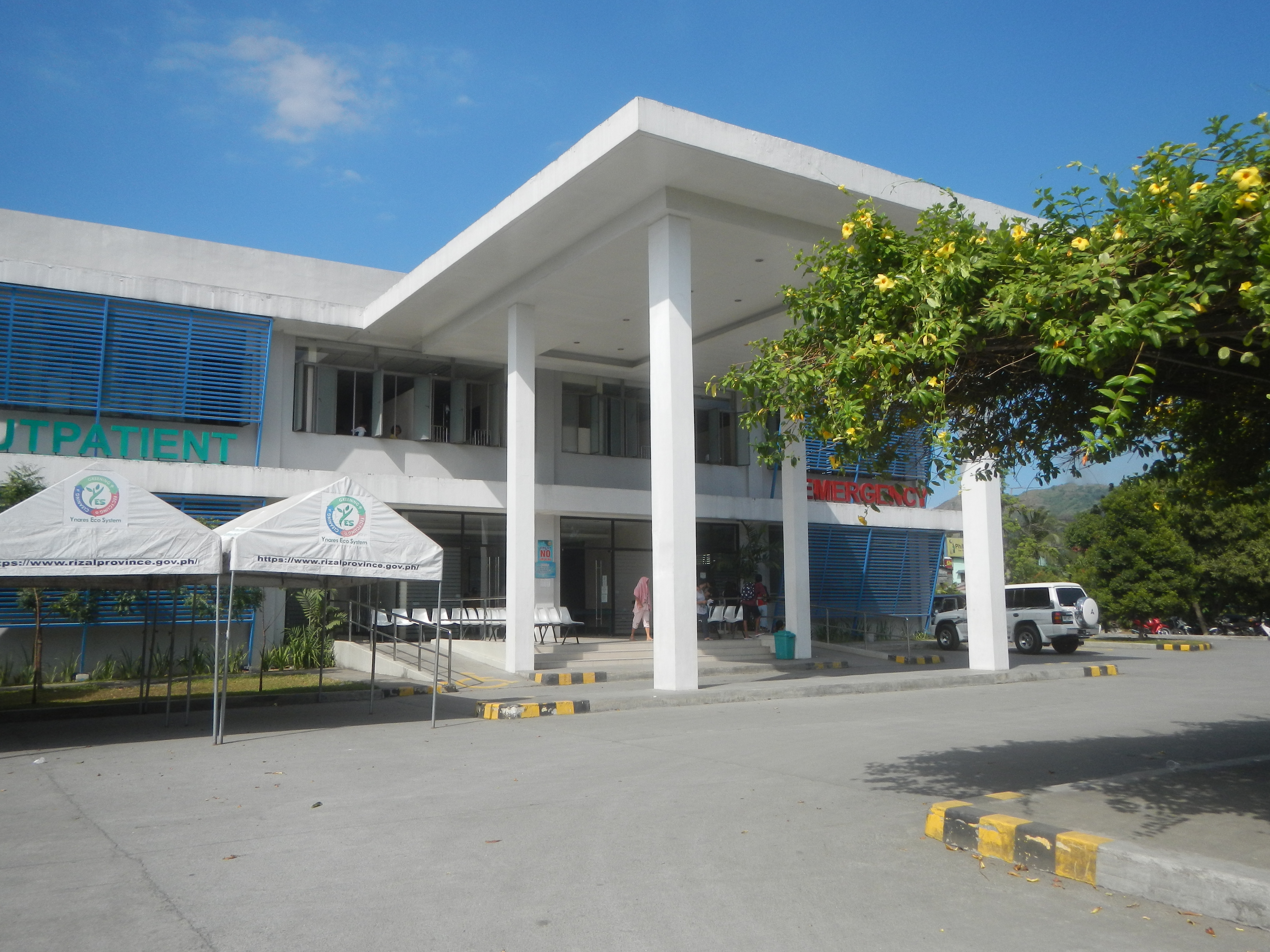
Casimiro A. Ynares Sr. Memorial Medical Center

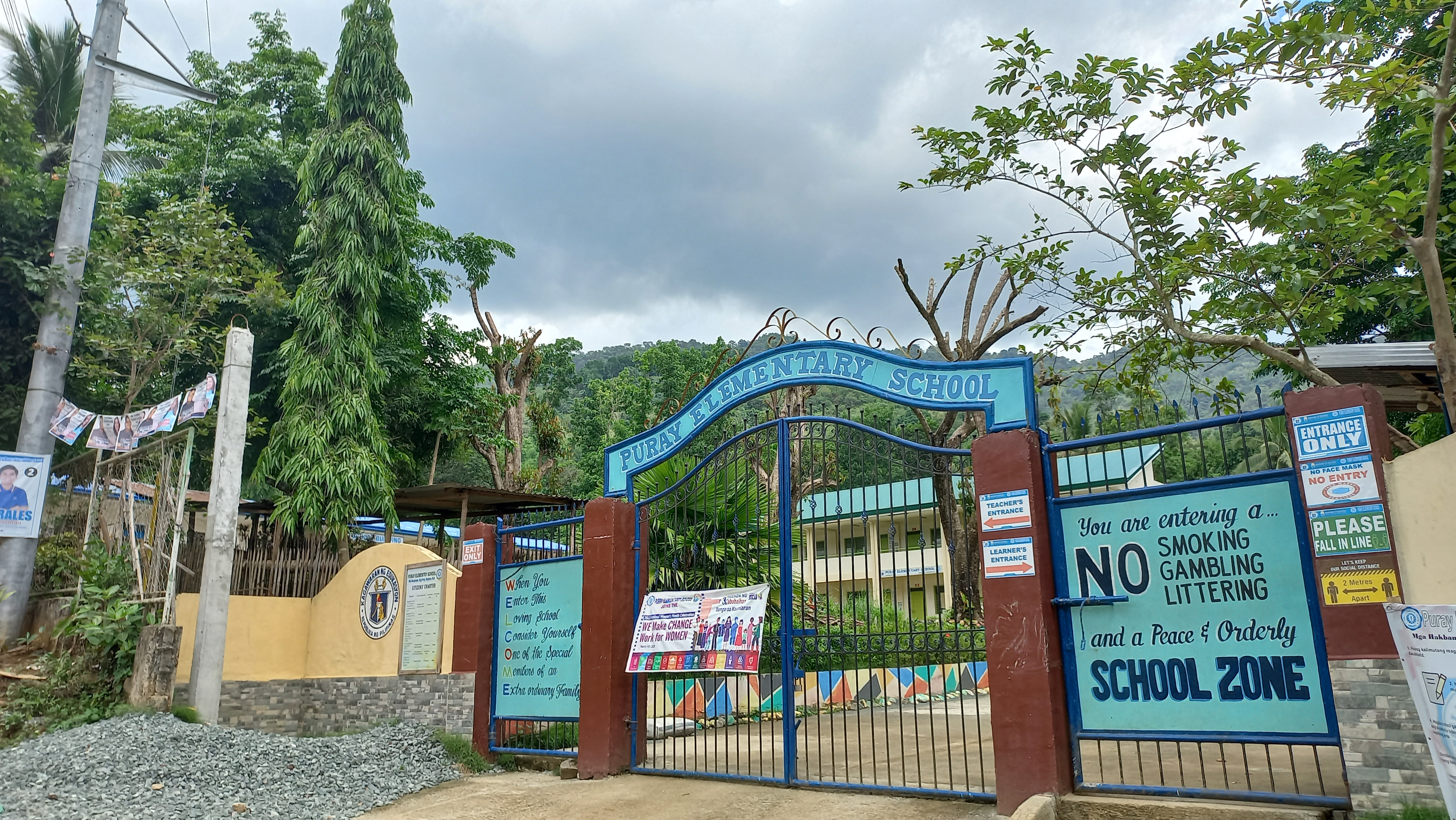
Puray Elementary School in barangay Puray

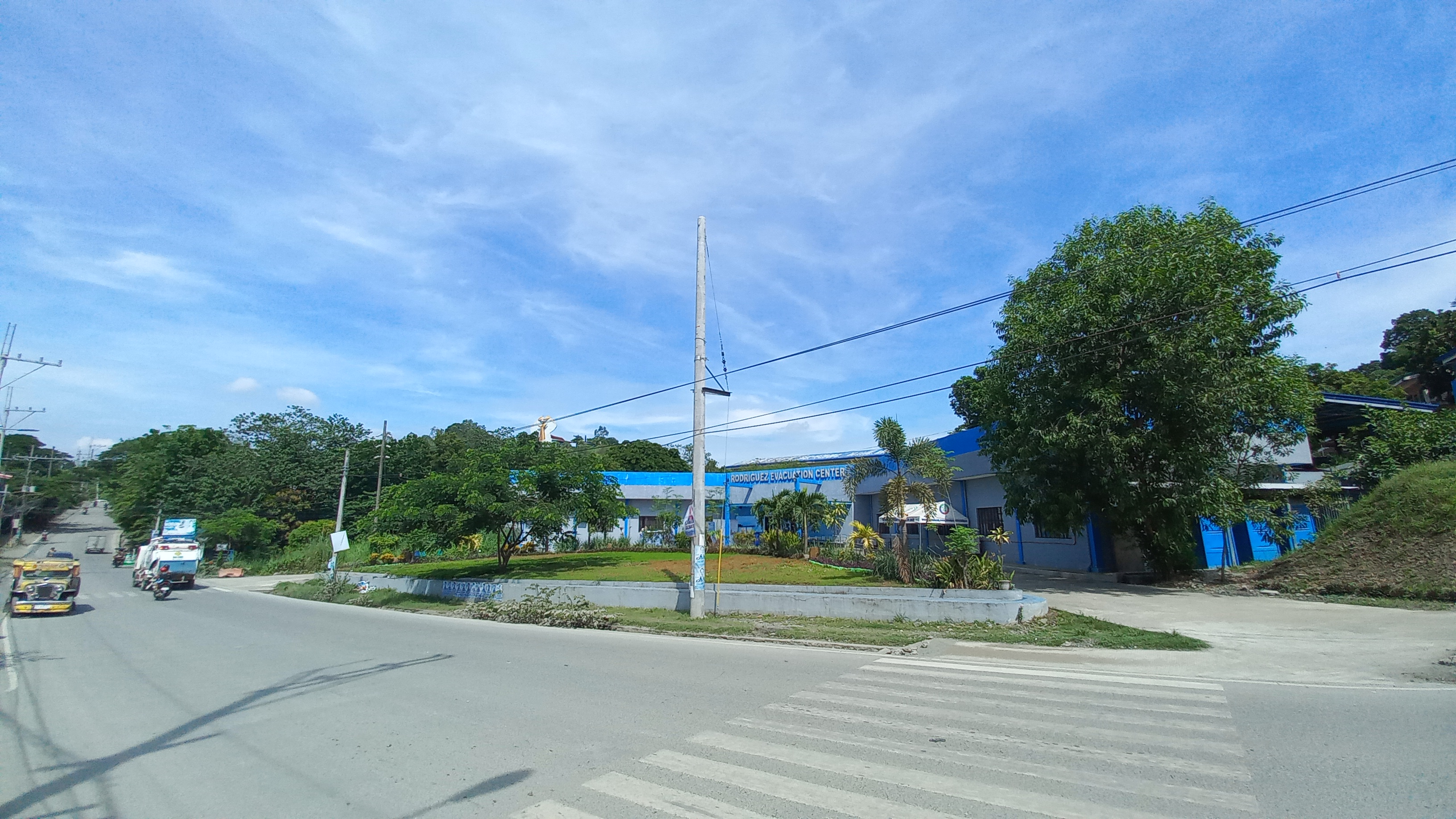
Rodriguez permanent evacuation center

== See also ==
- List of renamed cities and municipalities in the Philippines
- San Mateo, Rizal
