= Rodrigo de la Guitarra =

15th-century Spanish lutenist and composer

Rodrigo de la Guitarra ("Rodrigo of the gittern") was a Spanish lutenist and gittern player, active primarily in the first half of the fifteenth century.

Rodrigo was in the service of the House of Trastámara, and was a court composer for Ferdinand I of Aragon when he received the Crown of Aragon in 1412. At Ferdinand's death in 1416, Alfonso V was crowned King of Aragon, and Rodrigo remained in his service under the title ministril de camara. He was sent to visit the Count of Foix and the courts of Navarre and Castile, accompanied by Diego, a singer who also served the Aragonese royalty.

Rodrigo accompanied Alfonso on a visit to Naples in 1421; while he was away the following year, his wife, Ines Gonzalez, was kidnapped in Valencia, and his house was robbed. The abductors were caught in Seville and punished. By late 1423 he had returned to Spain, and is recorded as being in Barcelona; he remains in Aragonese records until 1427. He then disappears from the historical record until 1458, when he was one of several instrumentalists who accompanied the Feast of the Assumption in Toledo that year.

No surviving works have definitively been attributed to Rodrigo, though it has been suggested that he is the author of Angelorum psalat, a ballade from the Chantilly Codex. In the manuscript, the piece is listed under the name S Uciredor, or Rodericus spelled backwards, and Rodrigo de la Guitarra is the only known musician of the era with that name.
