= Justice Rodriguez =

Justice Rodriguez may refer to:

- Ariel A. Rodriguez (1947–2017), acting associate justice of the New Jersey Supreme Court
- Eduardo Rodríguez Veltzé (born 1956), chief justice of the Supreme Court of Bolivia
- Maite Oronoz Rodríguez (born 1976), chief justice of the Supreme Court of Puerto Rico
- Xavier Rodriguez (born 1961), justice of the Texas Supreme Court

== See also ==
- Judge Rodriguez (disambiguation)
