= Valerian Rodrigues =

Indian political scientist (born 1949)

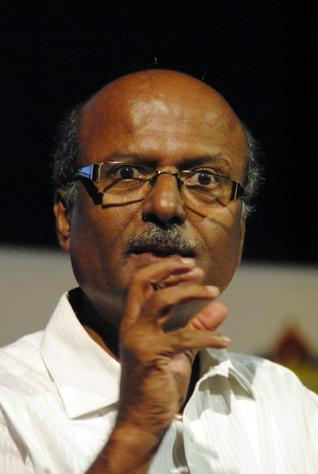
Born 29 July 1949

Valerian Rodrigues (born 29 July 1949) is an Indian political scientist. He is known for his influential work on Babasaheb Ambedkar, and for his formulations of themes in Modern Indian Political Thought. Rodrigues has made substantial contributions to the debate on the working of the Indian Parliament, constitutionalism in India, and agrarian politics in India. As a Professor at the Centre for Political Studies at Jawaharlal Nehru University (JNU), New Delhi, he was popular for his lectures on Indian Political Thought and Intellectual History, and critically reading the same through political concepts of modernity, secularism and nationalism.

== Early life ==
Rodrigues was born in Loretto, Bantwal Taluk, Karnataka. He received his MA from the University of Pune, and his M.Phil. and Ph.D. from Jawaharlal Nehru University, New Delhi. As a political activist in the 1970s, he was influential in securing land titles for landless farmers and farm workers of Coastal Karnataka under the Karnataka Land Reforms (Amendment) Act, 1974.

== Career ==
Before joining JNU, Rodrigues taught at the Department of Political Science at Mangalore University, Karnataka, India. He has held the first Ambedkar Chair at the Ambedkar University Delhi, has been ICCR (Indian Council of Cultural Relations) Visiting Professor at the University of Erfurt Germany, Visiting Professor at the University of Würzburg Germany, Visiting Professor at Simon Fraser University, Canada and Fellow at the Max Weber Center for Advanced Studies, Germany. Rodrigues is a regular political columnist and commentator with The Hindu and The Indian Express.

=== Academic career ===
After receiving his MA from the University of Pune, Rodrigues first taught at Sri Dharmasthala Manjunatheshwara College, Ujire, Karnataka. He received his PhD from the Centre for Political Studies, JNU, India, in 1986, and was Agatha Harrison Fellow at St. Anthony’s College, Oxford from 1989–1991. He was also a senior fellow at the Indian Institute of Advanced Studies, Shimla, from 1999–2001. Rodrigues taught Political Science at Mangalore University, Karnataka from 1982 to 2003 before moving to Jawaharlal Nehru University, New Delhi, where he was Professor of Political Studies from 2003 to 2015. He is also National Fellow of the Indian Council for Social Science Research (ICSSR).

== Selected works ==
- "Making a Tradition Critical: Ambedkar's Reading of Buddhism", in Peter Robb, ed., Dalit Movements and the Meanings of Labour in India, Oxford University Press, 1993]
- The Essential Writings of B.R Ambedkar (Oxford University Press) 2002
- "Dalit-Bahujan Discourse in Modern India" in V.R. Mehta and Thomas Pantham eds. Political Thought in Modern India, Sage, 2005
- "Untouchability, Filth and the Public Domain", in Gopal Guru eds.,Humiliation: Claims and Context, Oxford University Press, 2009
- The Indian Parliament: A Democracy at Work, (Oxford University Press], 2010
- Reading Texts and Traditions: The Ambedkar-Gandhi Debate, Economic and Political Weekly, 2011
- "Justice as the Lens: Interrogating Rawls through Sen and Ambedkar", Indian Journal of Human Development, Jan-June 2011
- In Search of an Anchor: Muslim Thought in Modern India, Economic and Political Weekly, 2011
- "Political Power and Democratic Enablement: Devraj Urs and Lower Caste Mobilisation in Karnataka", Economic and Political Weekly, 2014
- "Ambedkar as a Political Philosopher", Economic and Political Weekly, 2017
- "Parliamentary Opposition and Government Backbenchers in India" in Nizam Ahmed ed., Inclusive Governance in South Asia, Springer, 2017.
- Speaking for Karnataka, co-authored with Rajendra Chenni, Nataraj Huliyar and S.Japhet, Bengaluru University Press,2018
- Conversations with Ambedkar: 10 Ambedkar Memorial Lectures, Tulika Books, 2019

== See also ==
- Mangalorean Catholics
