= Eliane R. Rodrigues =

Brazilian-Mexican applied mathematician and statistician

Eliane Regina Rodrigues is a Brazilian applied mathematician and statistician who works in Mexico as a researcher at the Institute of Mathematics of the National Autonomous University of Mexico (UNAM). Her research involves using stochastic processes including Markov chains and Poisson point processes to model phenomena such as air pollution, noise pollution, the health effects of fat taxes, and the effectiveness of vaccination.

== Education ==
After undergraduate study in mathematics at São Paulo State University, Rodrigues earned a master's degree in probability theory from the University of Brasília, both in Brazil. She completed a PhD in applied probability from Queen Mary and Westfield College (now Queen Mary University of London) in England.

== Book ==
Rodrigues is the coauthor, with Brazilian mathematician Jorge Alberto Achcar, of the book Applications of Discrete-time Markov Chains and Poisson Processes to Air Pollution Modeling and Studies (Springer Briefs in Mathematics, 2013).

== Recognition ==
Rodrigues is a member of the Mexican Academy of Sciences, and an Elected Member of the International Statistical Institute.
