= Rodrigo (footballer, born 1999) =

Brazilian footballer

Personal information
- Full name: Rodrigo Guimarães Santos
- Date of birth: 6 April 1999 (age 27)
- Position: Midfielder

Team information
- Current team: PSTC

Youth career
- –2016: PSTC

Senior career*
Years	Team	Apps	(Gls)
2016–	PSTC	2	(0)
2017	→ União Rondonópolis (loan)	2	(0)
- * Club domestic league appearances and goals as of 16:14, 4 August 2020 (UTC)

Rodrigo Guimarães Santos (born 6 April 1999), commonly known as Rodrigo, is a Brazilian footballer who currently plays as a midfielder for PSTC.

== Career statistics ==
=== Club ===
As of 4 August 2020.

Club	Season	League			State League		Cup		Continental		Other		Total	
Club	Season	Division	Apps	Goals	Apps	Goals	Apps	Goals	Apps	Goals	Apps	Goals	Apps	Goals
PSTC	2018	–			1 (Note: Appearances in the Campeonato Paranaense - Segunda Divisão)	0	0	0	0	0	0	0	1	0
PSTC	2019	–			0	0	0	0	0	0	0	0	0	0
PSTC	2020	–			1 (Note: Appearances in the Campeonato Paranaense)	0	0	0	0	0	0	0	1	0
PSTC	Total		0	0	2	0	0	0	0	0	0	0	2	0
União Rondonópolis (loan)	2018	Série D	2	0	0	0	0	0	0	0	0	0	2	0
Career total			2	0	2	0	0	0	0	0	0	0	4	0
