= One Island =

One Island, 1 Island and similar may refer to:

- One Island East, a supertall skyscraper in Hong Kong
- One Island Lake Provincial Park, a provincial park in British Columbia, Canada
- 1 Island (Houtman Abrolhos) 28°54′34″S 113°52′55″E in the Houtman Abrolhos group, Western Australia

== See also ==
- One Man's Island
- Two Islands
- Three Islands
- Five Islands (disambiguation)
- Seven Islands (disambiguation)
- Forty Islands
- Hundred Islands
- Thousand Islands (disambiguation)
- Ten Thousand Islands
