= Five Islands =

Five Islands may refer to:

- Five Islands Nature Reserve, Australia
- Five Islands, Nova Scotia, Canada
- Five Islands in southern Louisiana
- Five Islands in Trinidad and Tobago
- Five Islands, Antigua and Barbuda
- Five Islands campus of the University of the West Indies
- Gotō Islands (五島列島, Gotō-rettō, literally: "five-island archipelago"), Japanese islands in the East China Sea

== See also ==
- One Island (disambiguation)
- Two Islands
- Three Islands
- Seven Islands (disambiguation)
- Forty Islands
- Hundred Islands
- Thousand Islands (disambiguation)
- Ten Thousand Islands
