= Pamitinan Cave =

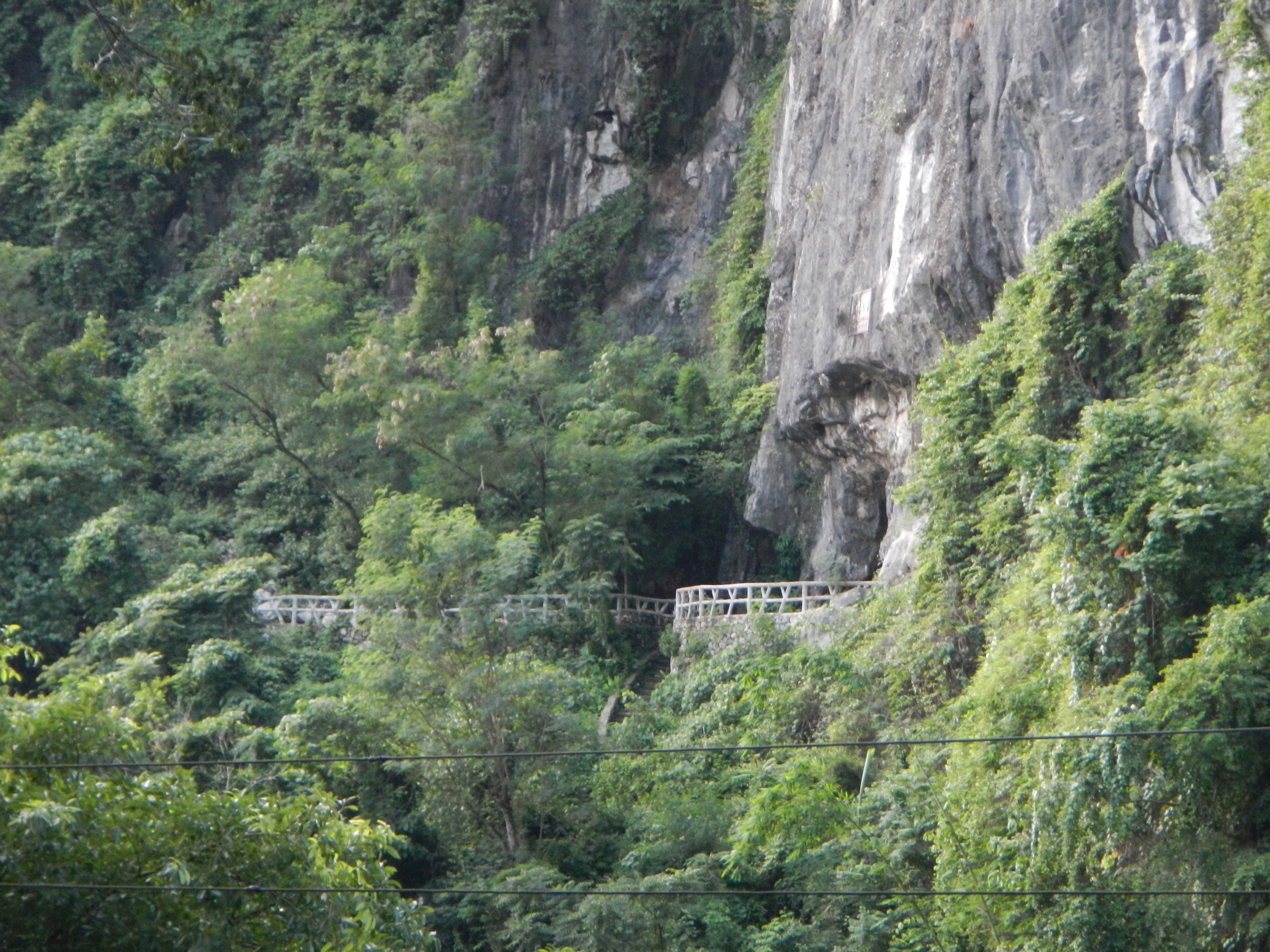
- Interactive map of Pamitinan Cave
- Location: Rodriguez, Rizal, Philippines
- Coordinates: 14°43′54.5556″N 121°11′24.3018″E
- Geology: Sierra Madre
- Access: Tours are available

Pamitinan Cave is a limestone cave in the foothills of the Sierra Madre mountain range near Wawa Dam in Rizal, the Philippines. It is located in the Pamitinan Protected Landscape, in the barangay of San Rafael, municipality of Rodriguez. The cave was formerly known as the '"Cave of Bernardo Carpio"'. Its former name was derived from Bernardo Carpio, a figure in Philippine mythology who was rebuked by the gods because of his insolence. Legend states that he was chained forever in the Montalban gorge, cursed to keep two mountains from colliding with each other.

On April 12, 1895, Andres Bonifacio along with eight other katipuneros declared the Philippines independence from the Spanish Empire inside of this cave. The walls still bear inscriptions of "Viva la Independencia Filipina" from the time of the Philippine Revolution. On June 21, 1996, Pamitinan cave was declared a historic site by the National Historical Commission of the Philippines.

During World War II, Japanese soldiers occupied the cave and used it as a camp.

== See also ==
- Historic site
- List of Philippine historic sites
- List of Cultural Properties of the Philippines in CALABARZON
