= Pamitinan Protected Landscape =

Protected area in Philippines

- IUCN category V (protected landscape/seascape)
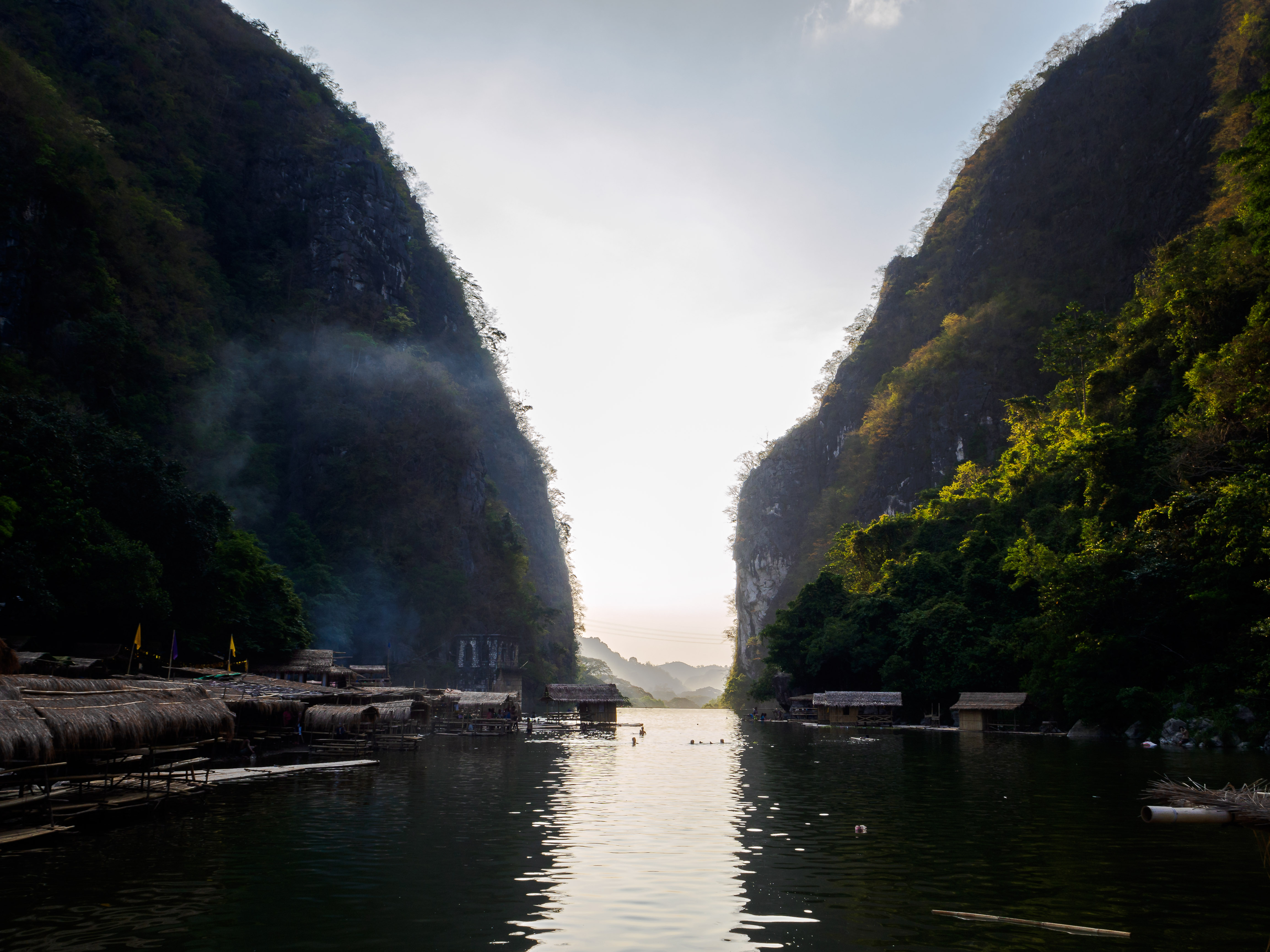
- The Montalban Gorge at the Pamitinan Protected Landscape

- Location within Philippines
- Location: Rizal, Philippines
- Nearest city: Quezon City
- Coordinates: 14°43′49″N 121°11′6″E
- Area: 609 hectares (1,500 acres)
- Established: July 26, 1904 (Reservation); October 10, 1996 (Protected landscape)
- Governing body: Department of Environment and Natural Resources; Department of Tourism

The Pamitinan Protected Landscape is a Philippine protected area of approximately 609 hectares (1,500 acres) in the Sierra Madre mountain range, just 34 kilometres (21 mi) northeast of Metro Manila. It contains and protects the Montalban Gorge formed by the Marikina River that separates Mount Pamitinan and Mount Binacayan in the municipality of Rodriguez in Rizal. Established in 1996 through Proclamation No. 901 issued by President Fidel Ramos, the park is originally a component of the Mariquina Reserve founded in 1904 to protect the watershed of the Marikina River that supplied water to the City of Manila from the Wawa Dam located just above the Montalban Gorge in the early 1900s.

The park is visited for its scenic views, as well as for recreational activities as hiking, mountain climbing, spelunking and historical sightseeing. It includes the Pamitinan Cave which played a role during the Philippine Revolution and was the focal point of the longest running battle during the Liberation of the Philippines during World War II, and is the setting of legends surrounding the Tagalog folk hero, Bernardo Carpio. The picturesque Montalban Gorge was declared a National Geological Monument and reserved area in 1983 by the National Committee on Geological Sciences of the Ministry of Natural Resources.

== Geography ==
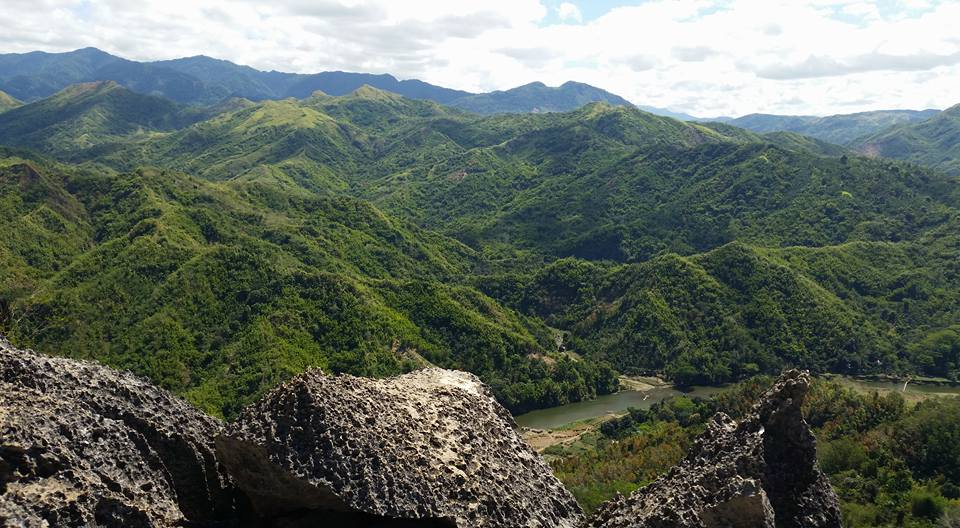
View of the protected landscape from the peak of Mount Pamitinan

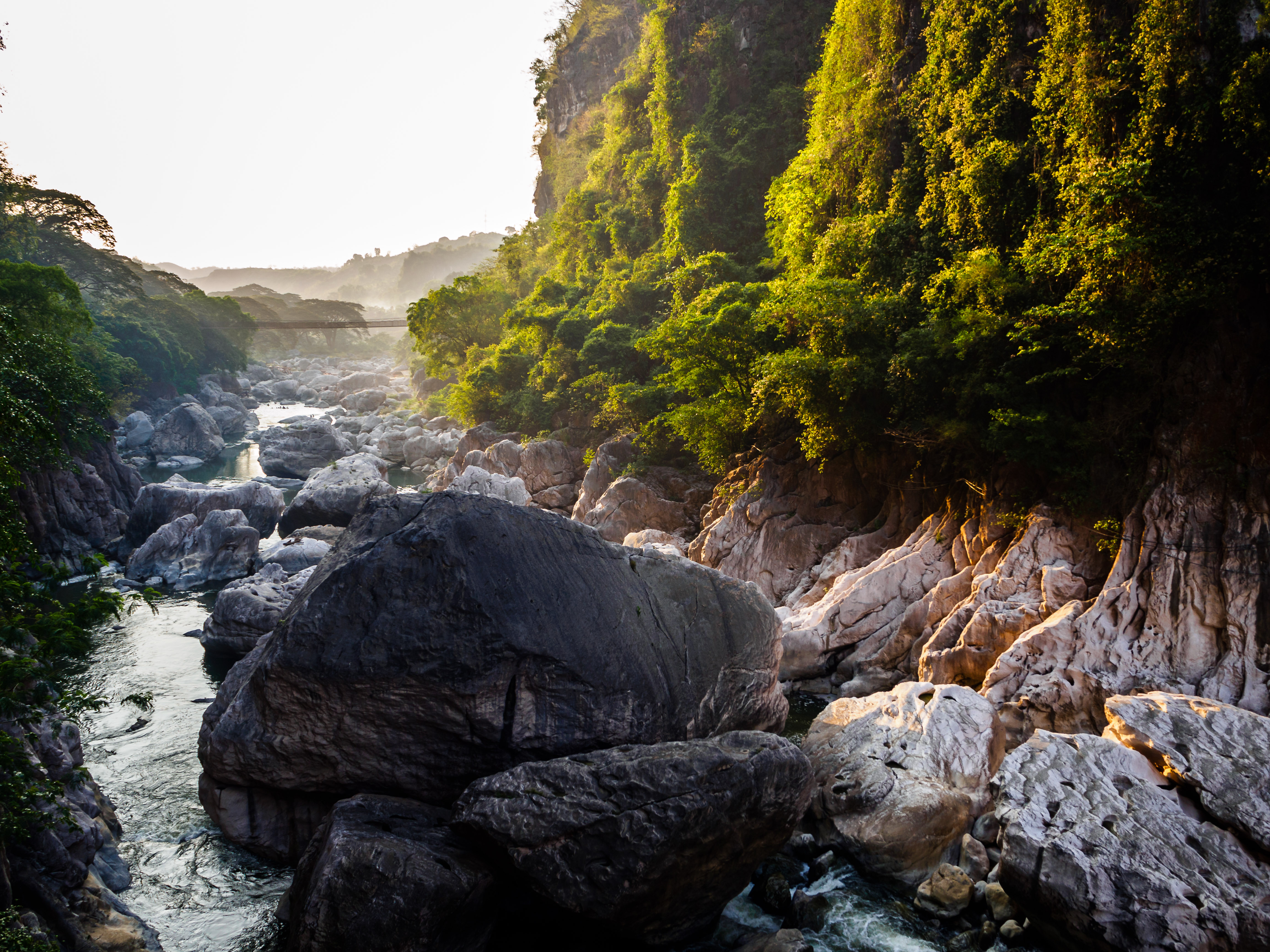
The Marikina River immediately downstream from the Wawa Dam

The Pamitinan Protected Landscape is situated in the sitio of Wawa within the jurisdiction of the barangay of San Rafael in the mountainous eastern section of Rodriguez, formerly the municipality of Montalban. It is centered on the 1,180-foot (360 m) high water gap carved by the Marikina River in the southern Sierra Madre of northern Rizal province. The Montalban Gorge, also known as Wawa Gorge, has been a popular tourist destination since the Colonial Era and was widely regarded as one of the most remarkable natural features of Oriental scenery in the early 1900s. It is ringed by a series of marble boulders, limestone crags and up to 160-foot (49 m) tall white rock walls. The gorge separates the 426-metre (1,398 ft) high Mount Pamitinan on the north from the 424 metres (1,391 ft) high Mount Binacayan on the south with the Wawa Dam and Marikina River running between them.

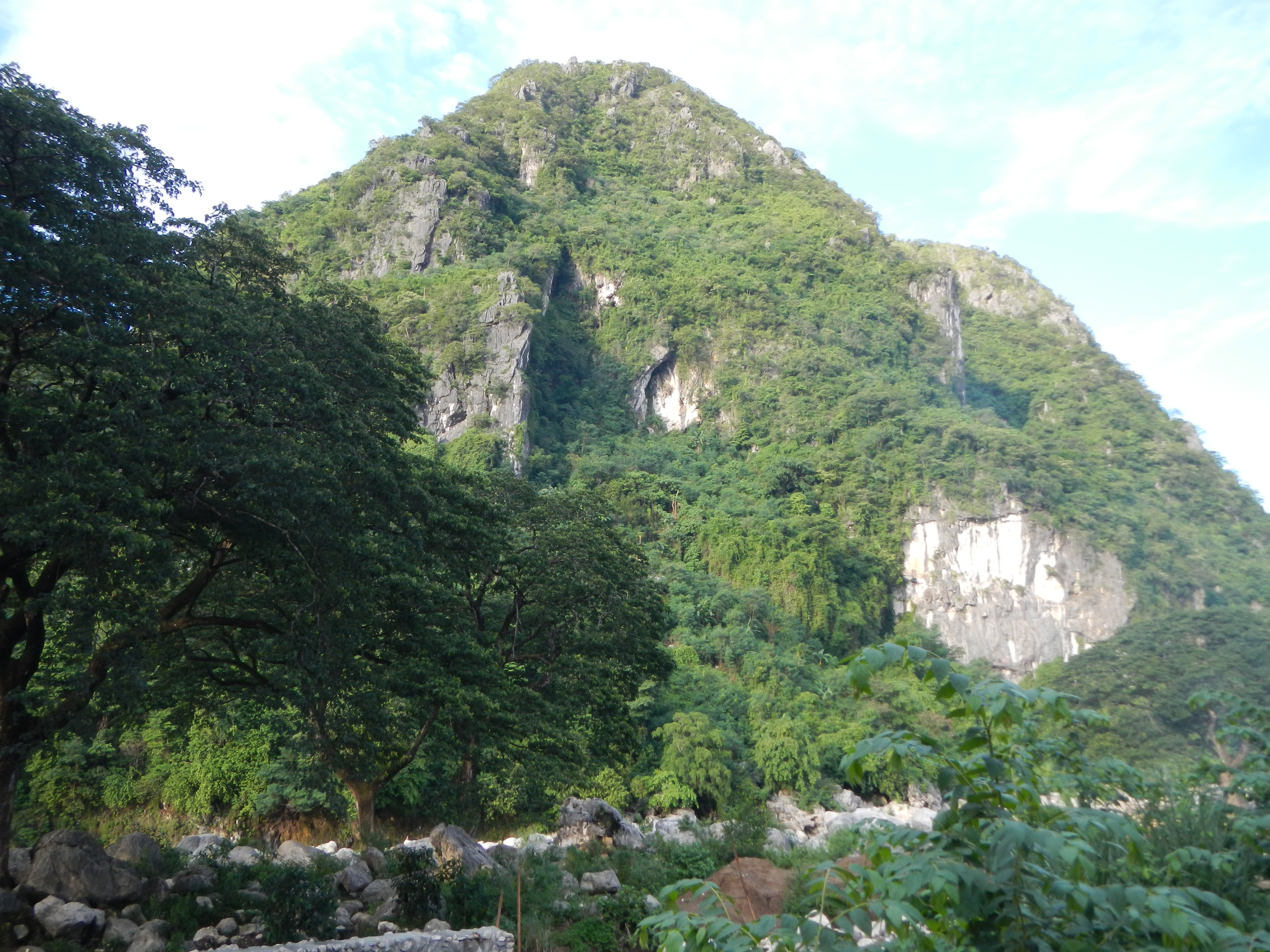
Mount Pamitinan as seen from the Marikina River

Mounts Pamitinan and Binacayan are two limestone mountains formed around 20-25 million years ago during the Miocene epoch. They create a dramatic backdrop to the "Wawa" Dam, so named for its resemblance to a portal or "entrance" in the local Dumagat language. The karst topography of the mountains is due to the continuous passage of water along their cracks and fractures over millions of years. Mount Pamitinan, the 22nd tallest mountain in Rizal, is a popular hiking destination for beginners from Metro Manila. It has designated hiking trails consisting of a muddy and slippery assault part and a rock climbing bouldering trail. It requires only two hours to reach its summit from the sitio of Wawa. Its twin mountain to the south, Mount Binacayan, has a more agricultural terrain consisting of less explored rock and bamboo trails.

The Pamitinan Cave in Mount Pamitinan is a declared National Geological Monument. It is notable for its rich stalactites and stalagmites with rimstone pools and cave coral. The multichamber cave was used as a secret headquarters of the Katipunan where Andrés Bonifacio and his fellow revolutionaries first declared Philippine independence from Spain on April 12, 1895. It also figured during World War II when it was turned into an armory by the Japanese invading forces. Many Japanese were killed here during a three-month-long battle with American forces in 1945. A cavern which measures 50 feet (15 m) in height and radius called Bulwagan ("Hall") is located about 500 metres (1,600 ft) from its mouth through a narrow passageway. It has the inscription Viva la Independencia written on its wall which dates back to the Philippine Revolution era. The cave is accessible via a hanging bridge from the Montalban gorge.

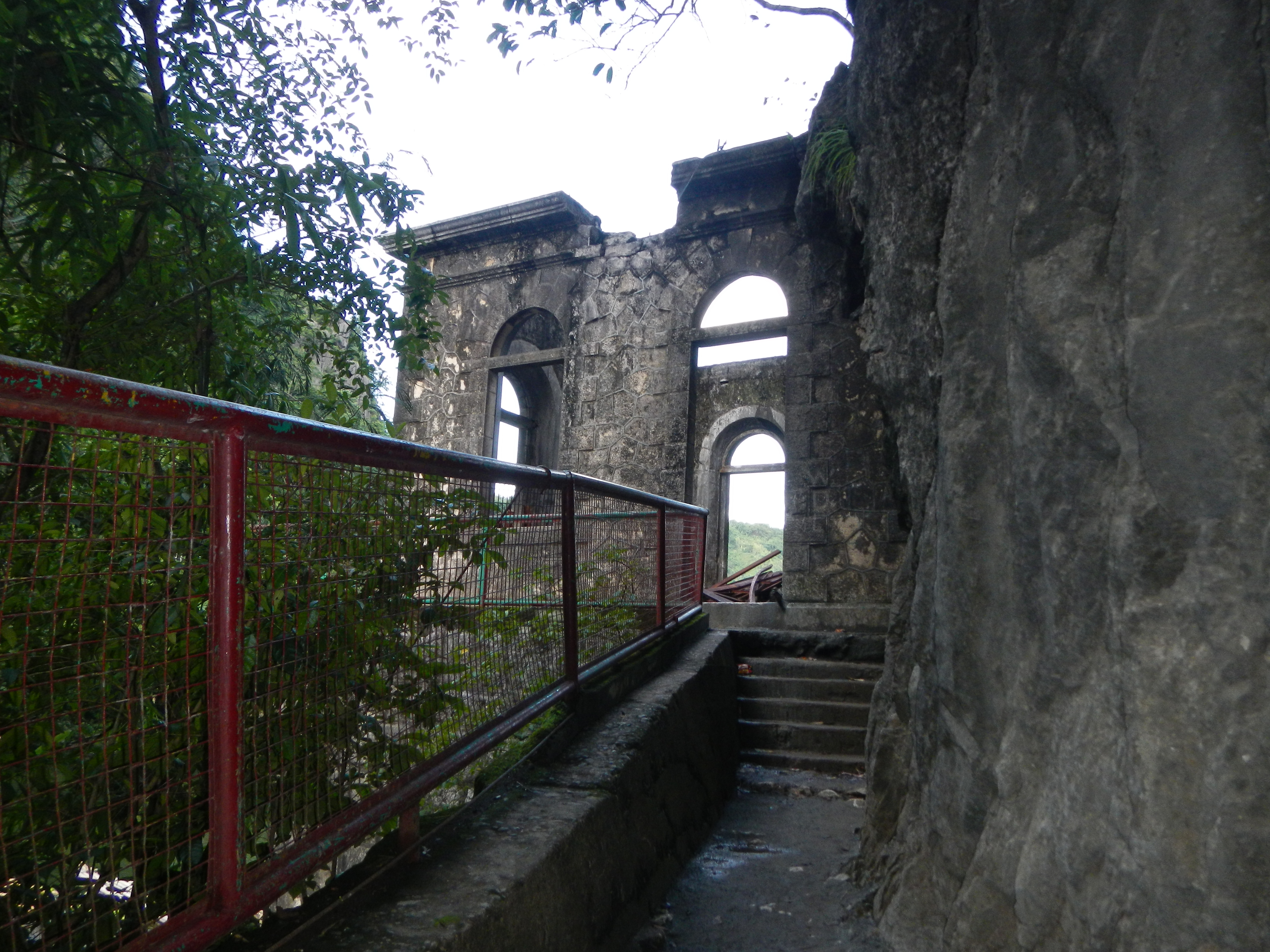
An American-era watchtower adjacent to Wawa Dam

The focal point of the protected area is the Wawa Dam, a decommissioned arch-gravity dam that is 12 metres (39 ft) tall and 85 metres (279 ft) long situated in this gorge portion of the Upper Marikina River. It was built in 1904 by the American colonial government and was the only source of water supply for Manila at the time until it was replaced by the Angat Dam in the 1960s. It is now a recreational and picnic spot where tourists ride bamboo rafts and swim in its reservoir that has an average depth of 3 metres (9.8 ft). The artificial waterfall over the dam was turned into a tourist spot where cottages and shops selling locals' fruit and vegetable produce have also been developed. It is accessible via a 500-metre (1,600 ft) trek from the sitio of Wawa.

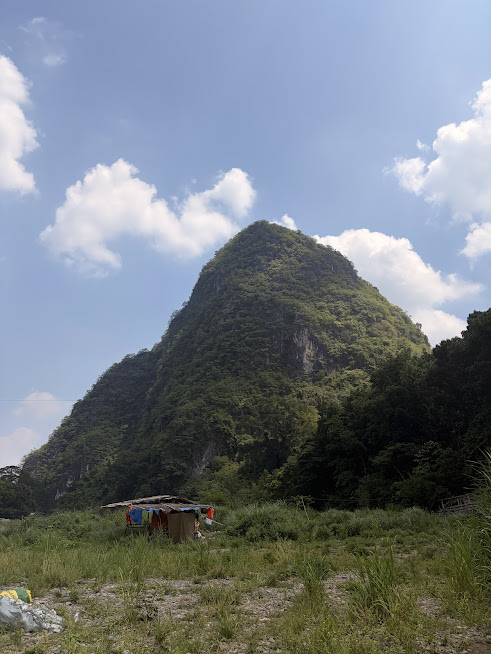
Mount Pamitinan seen from Mahogany Campsite (2026)

The park also includes the 517-metre (1,696 ft) high Mount Hapunang Banoi located just north of Mount Pamitinan. The mountain is the location of Mascap Spring. Another limestone cave known as Bat Cave which is only accessible during summer when the water level drops at Wawa Dam is also found within the protected area.

== Biodiversity ==
The protected landscape park has rich flora and fauna owing to its location in the Sierra Madre range. It is a known birdwatching site that offers sightings of the endemic scale-feathered malkoha, grey-backed tailorbird, elegant tit, grey-rumped swiftlet, white-browed shama, crested honey buzzard, Philippine bulbul, feral pigeon, peregrine falcon and mangrove blue flycatcher.

The park's vegetation resembles that of the adjacent Upper Marikina River Basin Protected Landscape and comprises dipterocarp species characteristic of lowland forests such as tanguile, mayapis, bagtikan, white lauan and red lauan.
