= Upper Wawa Dam =

- Location in Luzon Location in the Philippines
- Country: Philippines
- Location: San Rafael, Rodriguez, Rizal
- Coordinates: 14°42′0″N 121°12′10″E
- Purpose: Water supply and storage, regulation, flood control
- Status: Operational
- Construction began: 2021
- Opening date: 2025
- Operator: Manila Water

Dam and spillways
- Impounds: Marikina River
- Height (thalweg): 84 m (276 ft)
- Elevation at crest: 140 m (460 ft)
- Spillway type: Gated ogee weir with open air chute channel

Reservoir
- Total capacity: 450 ha (4.5 km^{2})

The Upper Wawa Dam is a concrete dam over the Marikina River, located in San Rafael, Rodriguez, Rizal, Philippines. It was constructed between 2021 and 2025, and started operating in May 2026

== Background ==
Upper Wawa Dam is constructed as part of the Wawa Bulk Water Supply Project, a two-phase infrastructure initiative that aims to address water supply shortages in Metro Manila and the nearby Rizal province. The first phase of the project is the construction of the Tayabasan weir, a 25-meter roller-compacted concrete structure designed to deliver 80 million liters per day (MLD). It was completed in 2022, and is composed of three parts: the weir, a water treatment plant and a pumping station, and the buried water pipeline. The second phase of the project is the construction of the Upper Wawa Dam, which is designed to deliver 518 million liters per day (MLD).

== Construction ==
Construction of the dam began in 2021. By the end of 2023, the dam is over 70% completed and is on track to be completed by 2025.

It is the largest water supply dam to be constructed in over 50 years, next to Angat Dam.

By April 2026, the Metropolitan Waterworks & Sewage System announced that the Upper Wawa Dam was considered for the Global Water Awards, for the project's transformative impact and long-term sustainability in addressing challenges in the water supply of Metro Manila.

== See also ==
- Water supply and sanitation in the Philippines
- Energy in the Philippines
