= Wawa Dam =

Dam in Rizal, Philippines

Wawa
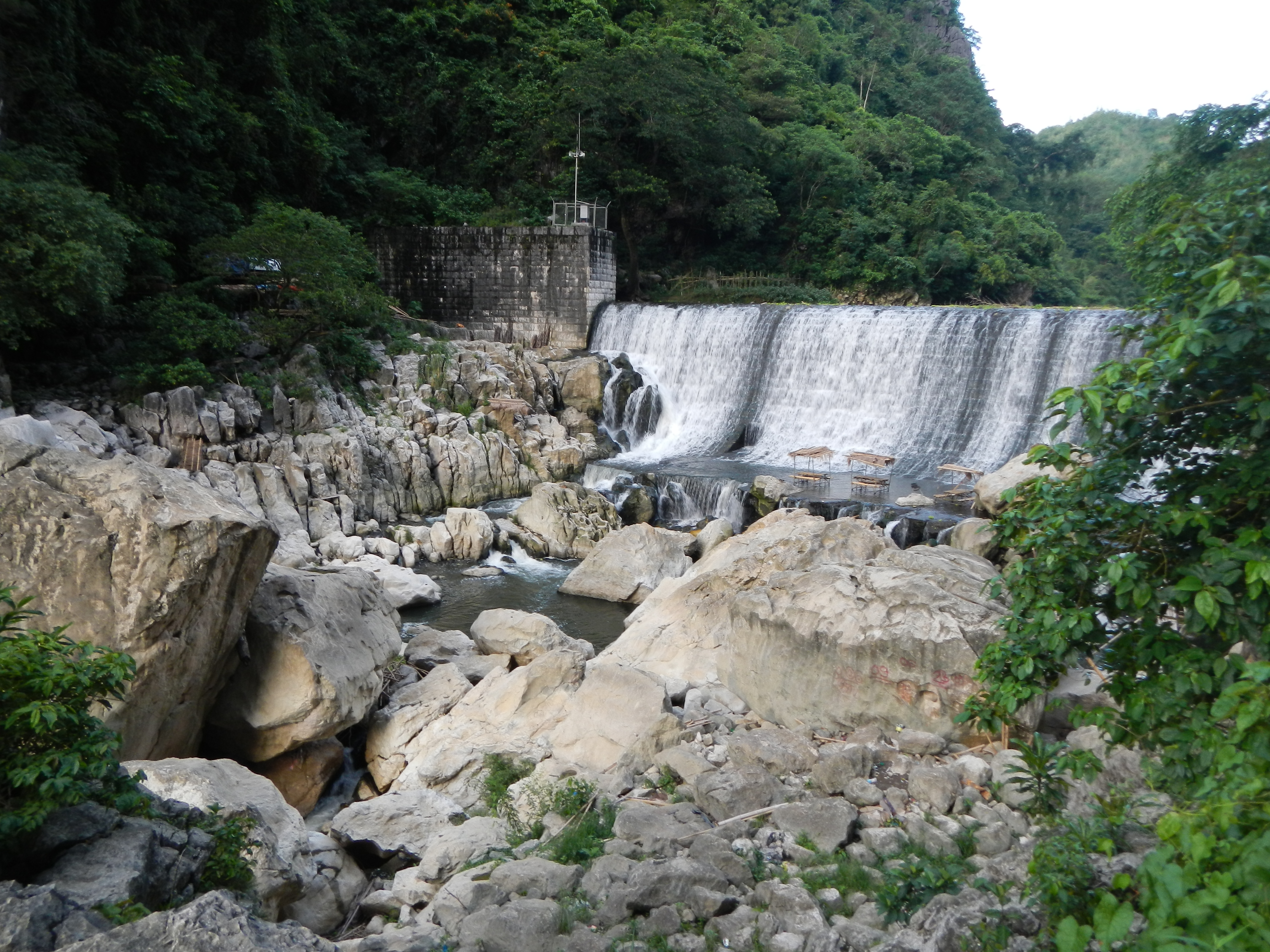
- Wawa Dam

- Location in Luzon Location in the Philippines
- Country: Philippines
- Location: Montalban Gorge, Rodriguez, Rizal
- Coordinates: 14°43′40″N 121°11′30″E
- Purpose: Water supply (original); Recreation (current)
- Construction began: 1904
- Opening date: 1909

Dam and spillways
- Type of dam: Arch-gravity dam
- Impounds: Marikina River
- Length: 280 feet (85 m)
- Spillways: One
- Spillway type: Ogee crest

Reservoir
- Maximum water depth: 13 m
- Normal elevation: 57 masl

Power Station
- Operator: Metropolitan Waterworks and Sewerage System
- Decommission date: 1968

Wawa Dam, also known as Montalban Dam, is a gravity dam constructed over the Marikina River in the municipality of Rodriguez, Rizal, Philippines. The slightly arched dam is situated in the 360-metre (1,180 ft) high Montalban Gorge or Wawa Gorge, a water gap in the Sierra Madre Mountains east of Metro Manila.

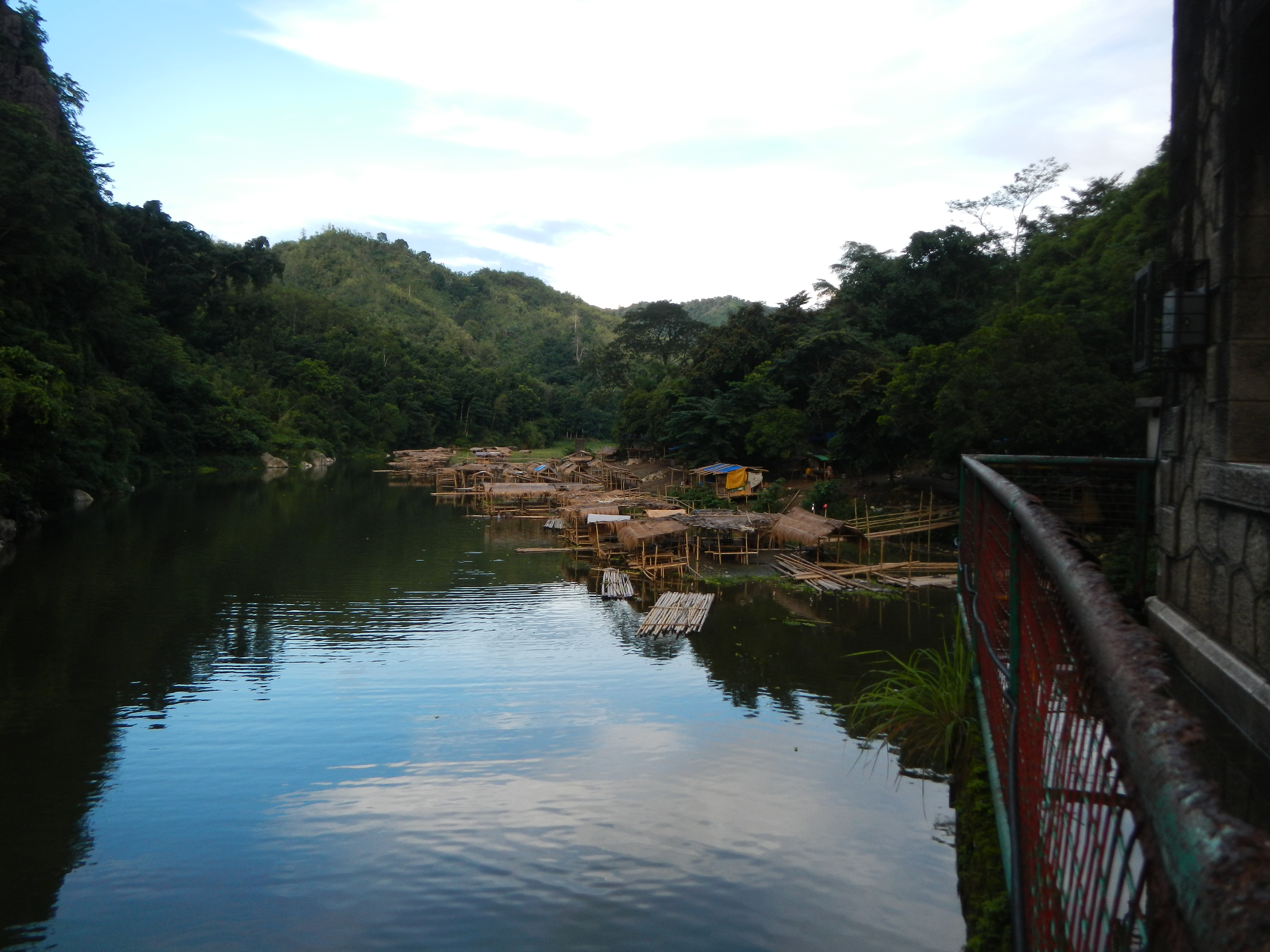
Scenery in June 2013

Construction on the dam began in 1904, which became operational in 1909 under the American colonial Insular Government, to provide the water needs for Manila.

During World War II, Wawa Dam became the focal point of the battle between the US Army's XI Corps and the Imperial Japanese Army's Shimbu Group. The engagement, also known as the Battle of Wawa Dam saw the opposing sides in a seesaw battle along the Montalban-Antipolo hills from March to May 1945.

Wawa Dam used to be the only source of water for Manila until Angat Dam was built and Wawa was abandoned in 1968. Due to insufficiency of water supply for Metro Manila, there was a strong clamor to reuse the dam. The dam and surrounding area is currently protected as part of the Pamitinan Protected Landscape.

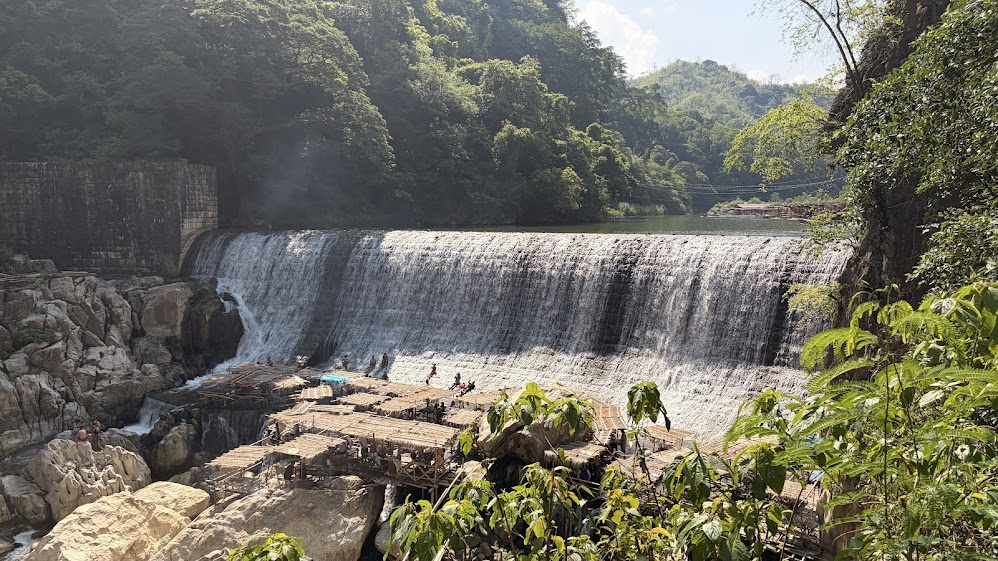
Wawa Dam in 2026

In July 2024, the impounding process of the ₱26.5 billion Upper Wawa Dam project, in San Rafael, Rodriguez, Rizal was undertaken by Prime Infra and Wawa JVCo. The Department of Environment and Natural Resources is tasked with protecting the Upper Marikina River Basin Protected Landscape. As part of the Wawa Pumped Storage Water Project, it creates a 400-hectare artificial lake for adequate water supply to operate a 600-megawatt energy storage facility.

== See also ==
- Water supply and sanitation in the Philippines
- Energy in the Philippines
