= Rocky Islets National Park =

Protected area in Queensland, Australia

- IUCN category II (national park)
- Location within Queensland
- Location: Queensland
- Nearest city: Cooktown
- Coordinates: 14°51′32″S 145°28′40″E
- Area: 3.2 km^{2} (1.2 sq mi)
- Established: 1939
- Governing body: Queensland Parks and Wildlife Service
- Website: Official website

Rocky Islets are part of the Three Islands National Park in Far North Queensland, Australia, in the Coral Sea, 1605 km northwest of Brisbane.

The islands are important and protected seabird nesting sites. Access to the Rocky Islets is prohibited.

== See also ==
- Protected areas of Queensland
