= Mille-Îles (disambiguation) =

Mille-Îles (meaning "Thousand Islands") can refer to:

== Places ==
- Mille-Îles, provincial electoral district in Laval, Quebec, Canada
- Mille-Isles, Quebec, municipality in Quebec
- Rivière des Mille Îles, a river channel off Montreal in Quebec, Canada
- Rivière-des-Mille-Îles (electoral district), federal electoral district in Quebec, Canada
- Thousand Islands (French: Mille Îles, historically), a region and archipelago between Canada and the US on the Saint-Lawrence River, near its source at Lake Ontario

== Other uses ==
- Éditions Mille-Îles, a Quebec publisher of comic books
- Thousand Islands Bridge (French: Pont des Mille-îles), a bridge between Ontario, Canada and New York, US

== See also ==
- Thousand Islands (disambiguation), one of several places with this name
- Mille (disambiguation)
- Ile (disambiguation)
