= Upper Marikina River Basin Protected Landscape =

Protected area in the Philippines

- IUCN category V (protected landscape/seascape)
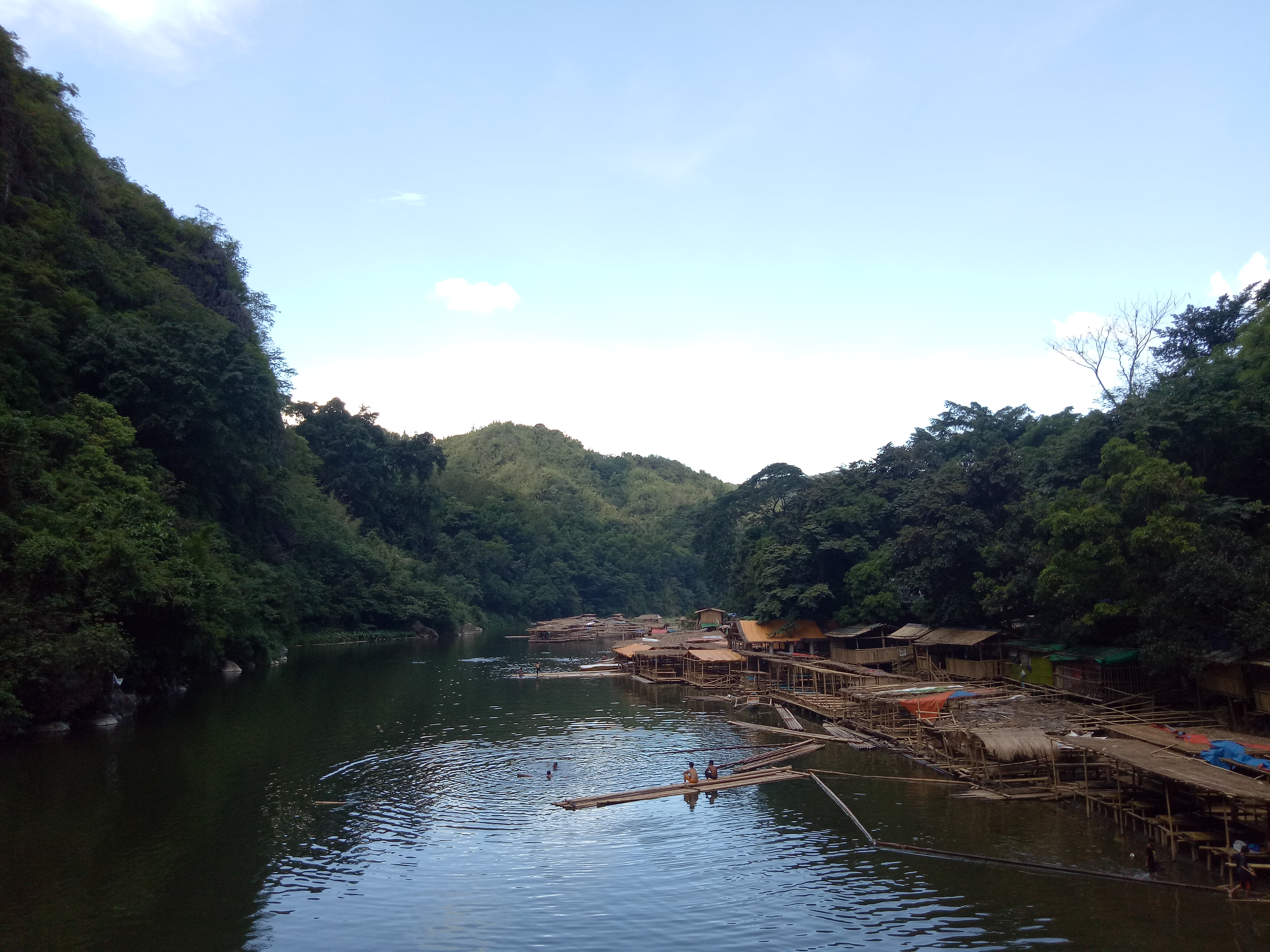
- The Upper Marikina River Basin in Rodriguez

- Location within Philippines
- Location: Rizal, Philippines
- Nearest city: Antipolo
- Coordinates: 14°40′16″N 121°12′50″E
- Area: 26,125.64 hectares (64,557.9 acres)
- Established: July 26, 1904 (Watershed reservation); November 24, 2011 (Protected landscape)
- Governing body: Department of Environment and Natural Resources

The Upper Marikina River Basin Protected Landscape is a protected area in the Province of Rizal in the Philippines, which forms the upper area of the drainage basin of the Marikina River.

The term "Marikina Watershed" is sometimes used to specifically refer to this protected area, but is also generally to the river's entire drainage basin, from the Sierra Madre Mountains of Rizal Province all the way to the Napindan area in Pasig, where its mouth empties into the Pasig River.

The Upper Marikina River Basin Protected Landscape had been named the Marikina Watershed Reservation until November, 2011, when President Benigno S. Aquino III upgraded its status from "reservation" to "protected landscape".

== Marikina River Catchbasin ==
=== Upper Marikina River ===
The area officially referred to as the Upper Marikina River Basin Protected Landscape covers 26,125.64 hectares, covering the upper reaches of the Marikina watershed in the Province of Rizal, flowing through the Antipolo, Baras, Rodriguez, San Mateo, and Tanay.

In Rodriguez, the river is dammed by Wawa Dam, a structure built during the early 1900s to provide water for Manila.

=== Lower Marikina River ===
From the official protected landscape area, the Marikina River then flows through its namesake city, Marikina. Near the boundary of Marikina and Pasig cities, the river meets the gates of the Manggahan Floodway, a controlled waterway used to prevent flooding in Manila during heavy rains by diverting most of the water of the Marikina towards Laguna de Bay (i.e. Laguna Lake) instead of the Pasig River. 6.75 kilometers (4.19 mi) further downstream through Pasig, the Marikina River's mouth finally empties into the Pasig River.

=== Tributary Waterways ===
The Marikina River at the center of the flows approximately 11 km and has a number of tributaries in the form of creeks and rivers, draining four municipalities and one city in the Province of Rizal, and three cities in the Philippines' National Capital Region.

Rodriguez, Rizal
The biggest of these tributaries are upstream in the more mountainous areas of Rodriguez. This includes the Tayabasan and Montalban rivers, the Boso Boso River, and the Wawa River, which meets the Marikina River just upstream of Wawa Dam. Further downstream from the dam, but still in the town of Rodriguez are the Puray river (which flows near Avilon Zoo), and the Manga river.

San Mateo, Rizal
Up till this point the river follows a more or less East-West direction until San Jose, Rodriguez, where it takes a sharp North-South turn towards the Municipality of San Mateo, where the Ampid River forms the boundary between Barangays Maly and Ampid. At this point across the River in Quezon City, Calamiong Creek drains Barangay Bagong Silang. Further downstream the Nangka River and its own tributary in the Sapang Labo Creek mark the Boundary between San Mateo and Marikina.

City of Marikina
Somewhere north of Brgy Tumana in Marikina marks a point at which an American Colonial Era levee shifted the flow of Marikina River west, away from the population center of Sitio Bayanbayanan (Now known as Concepcion Uno), where erosion had been a problem. The construction of a levee left behind a remnant waterway now known as Patay na Ilog (literally "Dead River", referring to the former path of the river) where the original path of the river once traversed, which rejoins the Marikina River just south of Tumana Bridge. The dredging for this American era levee left behind a large stone outcropping just below water level where the Marikina's children would play, back when the water was still clean, such that this part of the river is still called "luksong kabayo".

The name of Barangay Tumana, in the Tagalog language, means a fertile highland above water level. The area was considered ideal for vegetable farming due to the rich riversoil, and the annual inundation of the area by the Marikina River during rainy season, which prevented crawling insect pests from staying permanently. This area was eventually also used for riversoil quarrying and saw an influx of informal settlers which turned it into a residential area, eventually becoming a separate Barangay from Concepcion, with Patay na Ilog forming part of the boundary.

Further south on the Quezon City side Barangay Pansol is drained by Pansol Creek, with headwaters reaching as far up to just behind the University of the Philippines Integrated School Campus. Even Further South in Barangay Malanday, Marikina, the Lamuan-Bulelak creek also empties into the Marikina River, although its precise mouth area has been blurred by the construction of residential buildings.

Adjacent Creeks
In Marikina, numerous other creeks flow nearby the Marikina river but are not directly connected. These include the Bankaan Creek in Barangay Parang, the Concepcion Creek in Barangay Concepcion Dos, and the Usiw Creek in Barangay Sta Elena. Instead, these waterways are linked in a complex network with the Balanti, Halang, and Muntingdilao Creeks and the Sapang Baho River, eventually emptying into Manggahan Floodway and Laguna de Bay.

== Surrounding Protected Areas ==
As defined by Presidential Proclamation No. 296 which created it, the Upper Marikina Watershed Protected Landscape is surrounded with other reservations and protected areas on all sides except the south, where it is surrounded by "alienable and disposable lands".

It is bounded on the West by the Lungsod Silangan Townsite Reservation (created under Presidential Proclamation 1637 dated April 18, 1977); Pamitinan Protected Landscape (created under Presidential Proclamation 901 dated October 10, 1996); on the southwest by the Integrated Social Forestry Program Area (defined under Presidential Proclamation 585 dated June 5, 1990);on the East by Kaliwa Watershed Forest Reserve (created under Presidential Proclamation 573 dated June 26, 1969); and on the North by Angat Watershed Forest Reserve (created under Presidential Proclamation 71 dated March 10, 1927).

== Administration ==
The Marikina Watershed Reservation was originally created on July 26, 1904, by virtue of Executive Order No. 33, which was issued by then Governor-General of the Philippine Islands Luke Edward Wright.

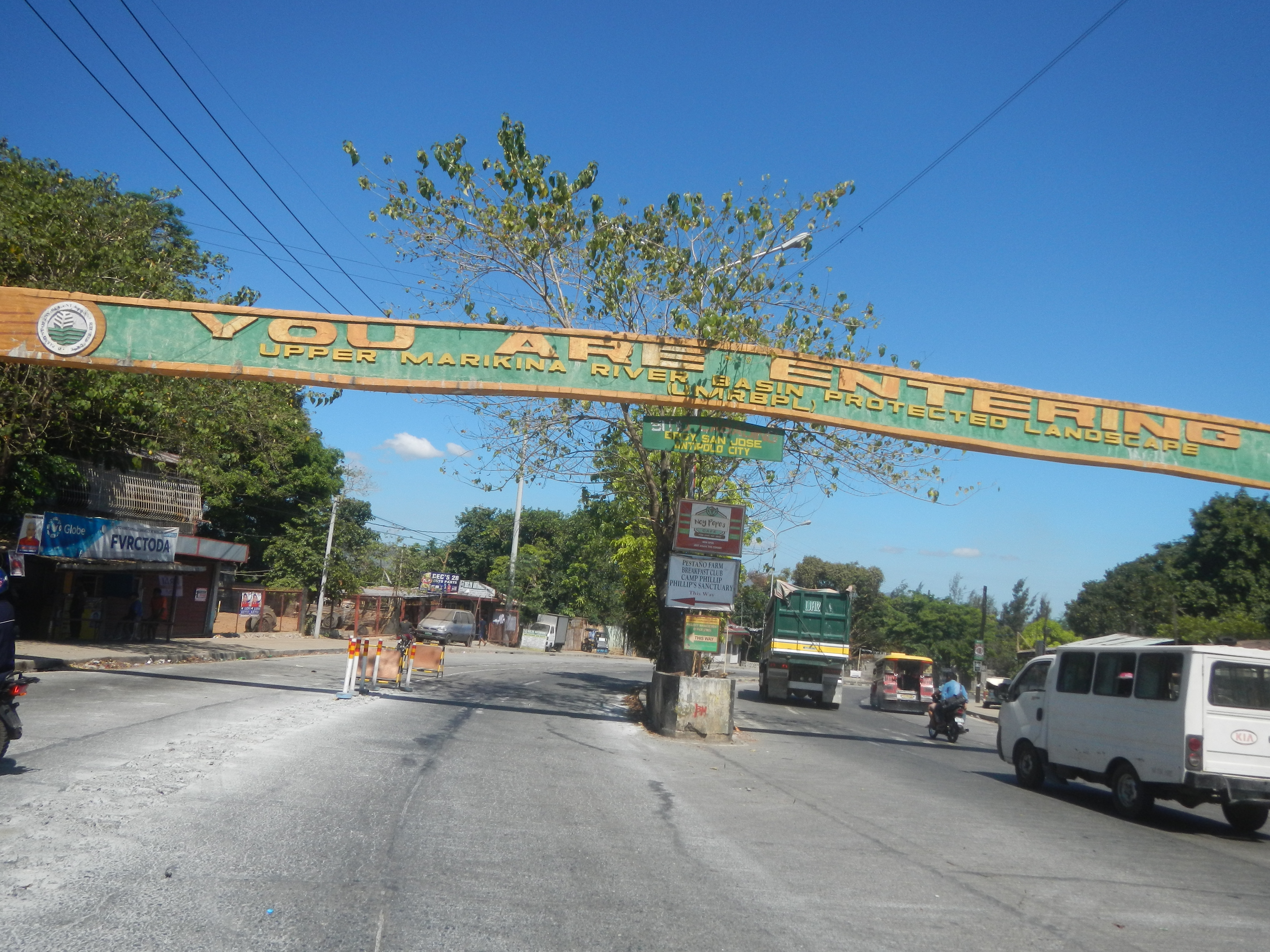
San Jose (Poblacion) welcome arch

The order set aside a tract of land in the Province of Rizal to be known as the "Mariquina Reservation". Its stated objective was "to protect the watershed of the Mariquina River, the source of the water supply of the city of Manila". It described the area of the reservation thus:

"In the Province of Rizal: Beginning on the summit of Mount Cayabasan, on the northern boundary line of Rizal Province, and running in a southerly direction along the summit of the range of mountains to a point on the summit of the mountains, about five miles northeast of the town of Varas; thence westerly along the summit or ridge to a point halfway between Antipolo and Boso-Boso (now Barangay San Jose in Antipolo), where the trail crosses said ridge, thence northerly along said ridge or summit to Mount Bantay, where the northern boundary line of Rizal Province crosses Mount Bantay; thence easterly along said northern boundary line of Rizal Province to the place of beginning, containing one hundred square miles, more or less."

Proclamation 296 placed the Upper Marikina River Basin Protected Landscape "under the administrative jurisdiction of the Department of Environment and Natural Reosources" under the provisions of the National Integrated Protected Areas System (NIPAS) Act of 1992.
