= National Geological Monuments of the Philippines =

National Geological Monuments (NGM) is a declaration bestowed on landforms and features within Philippines possessing geological significance and uniqueness, as evaluated by the National Committee on Geological Sciences.

== Background ==
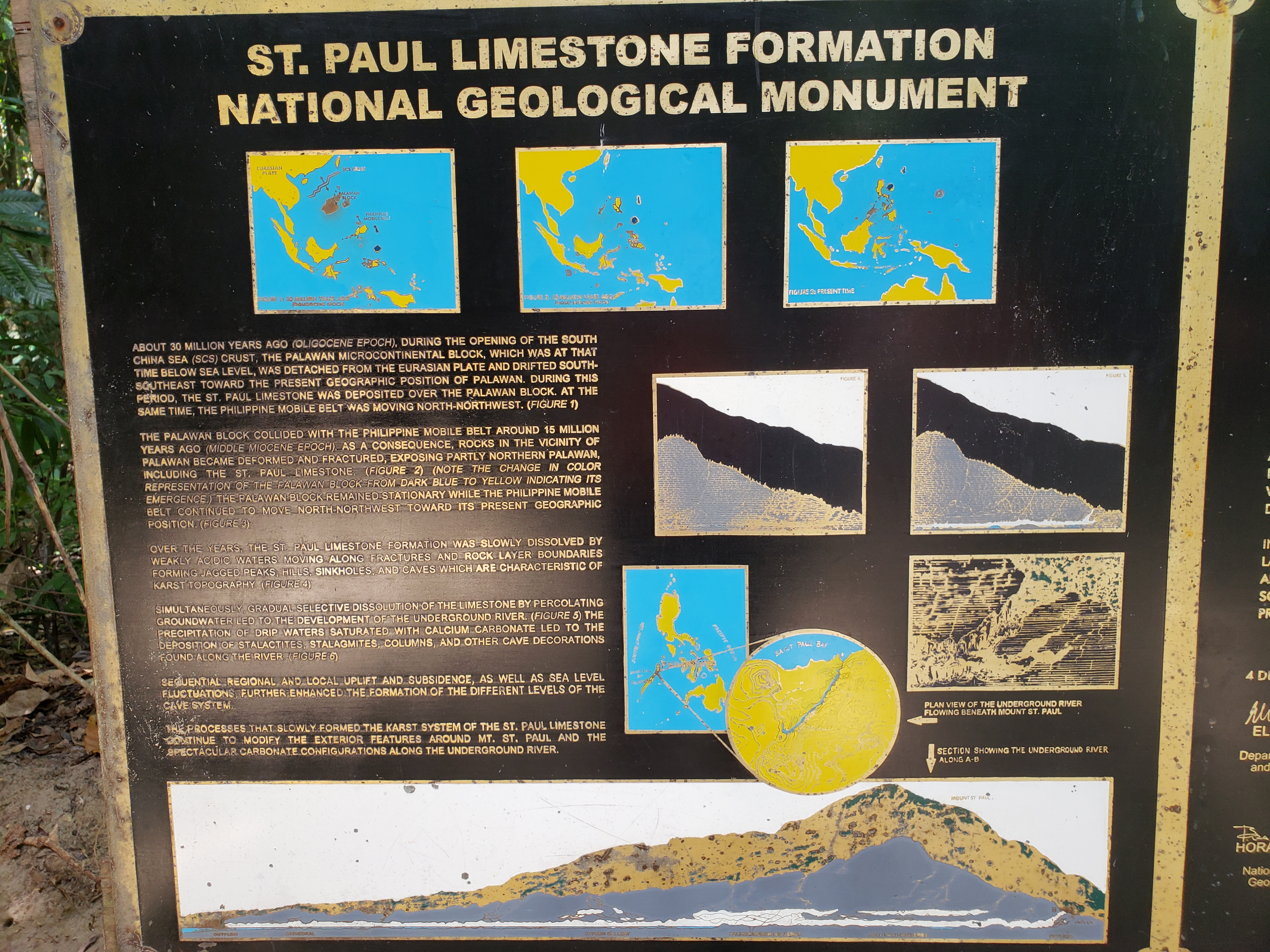
St. Paul Limestone formation National Geological Monument (NGM) marker

The National Committee on Geological Sciences was created via Executive order no. 625 on October 8, 1980. This committee is under the Office of the President of the Philippines, which consists of 21 government agencies headed by the Mines and Geosciences Bureau (MGB) of the Department of Environment and Natural Resources (DENR).

Among the committee's programs was the establishment of National Geological Monuments, a declaration on landforms and geological features within the Philippines with high scientific, educational or aesthetic value worthy of protection, preservation and conservation.

== List ==
As of 2024, there are 7 declared National Geological Monuments in the Philippines.

NGM name	Location	Date of declaration	Ref.
WawaDamjf5989 08 Montalban Gorge	Rodriguez, Rizal	September 10, 1983	
Taal volcano crater Taal Volcano	Batangas Province	June 18, 1988	
Chocolate Hills Bohol Chocolate Hills	Carmen, Batuan and Sagbayan, Bohol Island	June 18, 1988	
Laoag Sand Dunes facing coast close-up (La Paz, Laoag, Ilocos Norte; 11–17–2022) Ilocos Norte Sand dunes	Laoag, Ilocos Norte	November 26, 1993	
A pieces of land in the islands of Hundred Islands, Pangasinan Hundred Islands	Alaminos city, Pangasinan	September 14, 2001	
Palawan Limestones near Puerto Princesa Subterranean River National Park St. Paul Limestone Formation	Puerto Princesa, Palawan	December 11, 2003	
Loon 7 earthquake Loon- Maribojoc Geological Monument	Loon and Maribojoc, Bohol Island	May 14, 2015	
Biri Rock Formation	Biri, Northern Samar	June 4, 2025	

== Other considered sites ==
- Asik Asik Falls in Alamada, Cotabato

== Threats and controversies ==
- In 2015, the declaration of the Loon-Maribojoc Geological monument as National Geologic Monument was opposed by the local government of Loon, inciting debates on the legality of the DENR in declaring the site as such
- In 2024, a Facebook post from Captain's Peak Resort went viral for its modification and seeming destruction of parts of the protected area of the Chocolate Hills National park, prompting increased public scrutiny. Investigations revealed more resorts of a similar nature. This resulted in the suspension of some Bohol mayors and other local officials.
