= Marikina River =

River in Luzon, Philippines

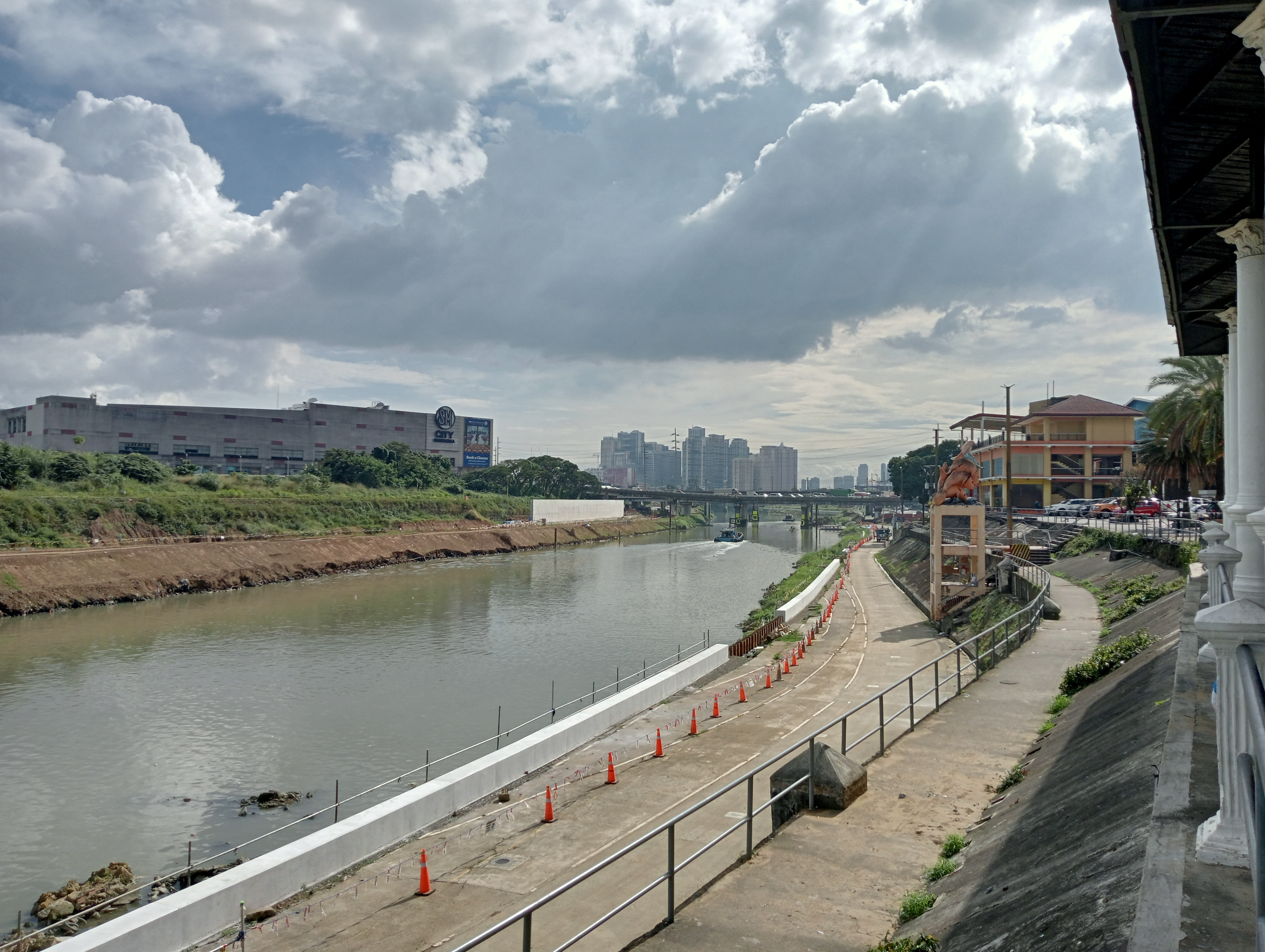
- Marikina River in Marikina

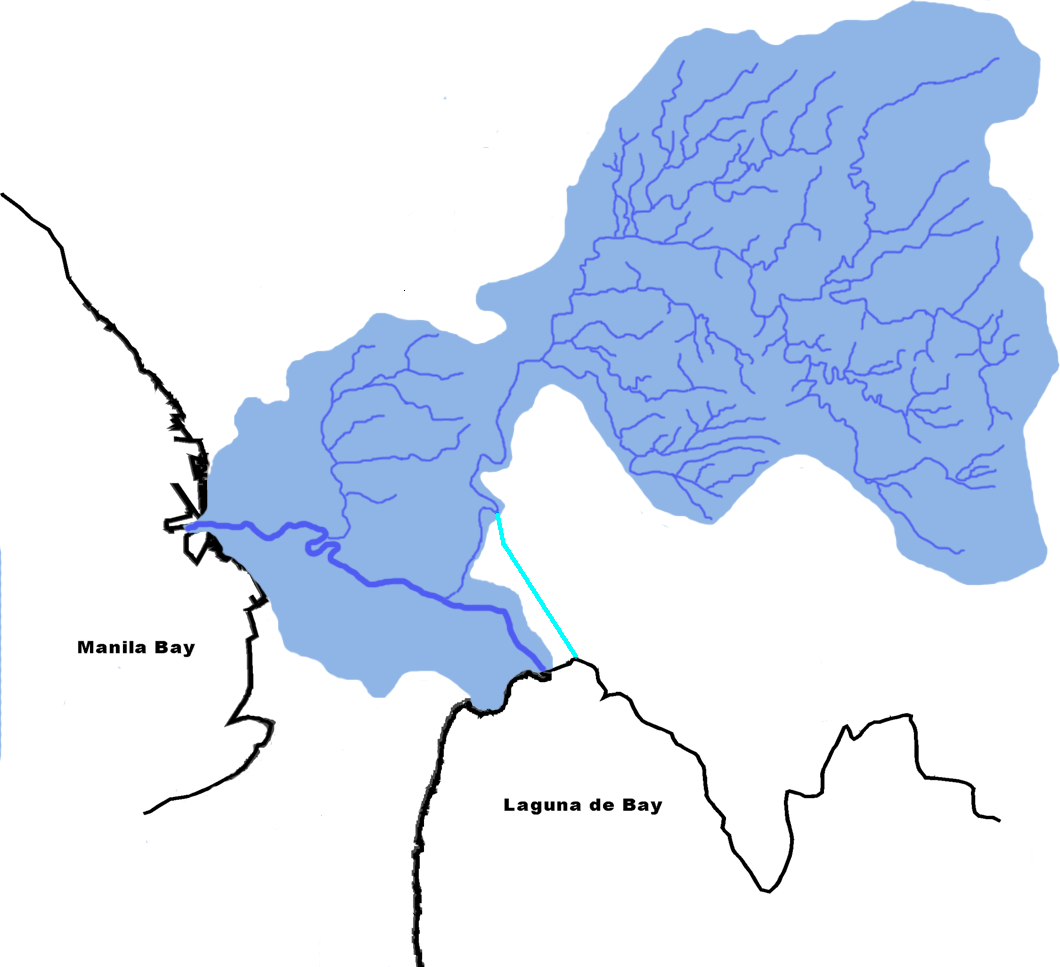
- Drainage map of the Pasig-Marikina River River system

- Marikina River mouth Marikina River (Philippines)
- Native name: Ilog ng Marikina (Tagalog)

Location
- Country: Philippines
- Region: National Capital Region; Calabarzon
- District: Marikina; San Mateo; Quezon City; Pasig

Physical characteristics
- Source: Sierra Madre mountains
  - location: Rodriguez, Rizal
- Mouth: Pasig River
  - location: Pasig
  - coordinates: 14°33′30″N 121°04′05″E
  - elevation: 0 m (0 ft)
- Length: 78 km (48 mi)
- Basin size: 680 km^{2} (260 sq mi)
- Discharge
  - maximum: 160 m^{3}/s (5,700 cu ft/s)

Basin features
- Progression: Marikina–Pasig

The Marikina River (Tagalog: Ilog Marikina) is a waterway in eastern Metro Manila, Philippines. It is the largest tributary of the Pasig River, with headwaters in the Sierra Madre Mountains in what was known as Montalban, presently the municipality of Rodriguez, Rizal.

The Marikina River used to be an important transport route during the Spanish colonial era, but its importance as a transport route diminished when the Philippines' national highway system became more established. The resulting lack of river boat traffic and the deforestation of the upland areas in what is now the Upper Marikina River Basin Protected Landscape (UMRBPL) contributed to the river's siltation, further reducing its value as a transport route.

== The Marikina River system ==
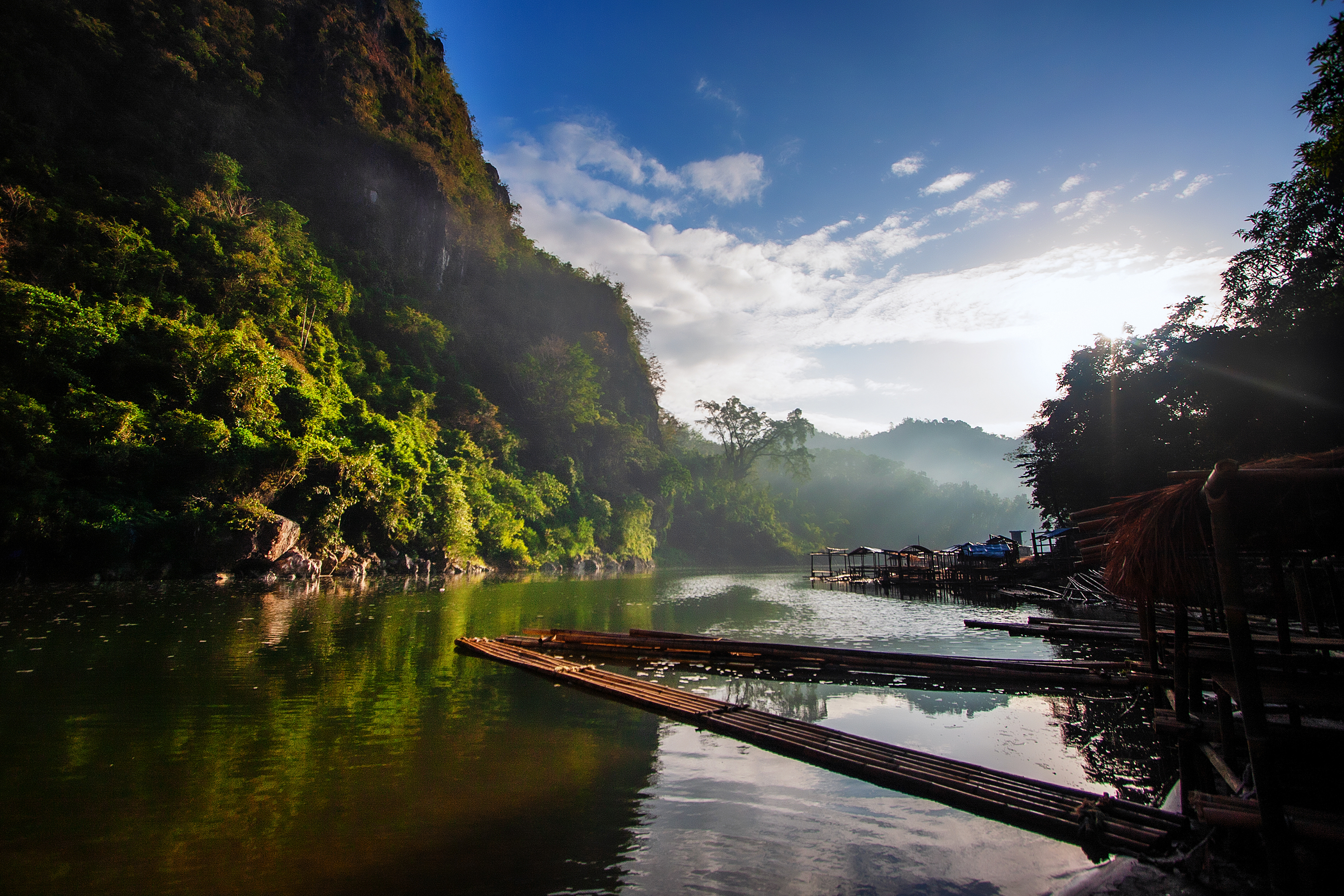
Upper Marikina River Basin

In the Pamitinan Protected Landscape located in Sitio Wawa, Brgy. San Rafael, in Rodriguez, the Marikina River is dammed by Wawa Dam, a structure built during the early 1900s to provide water for Manila. From Rodriguez, the river flows through San Mateo then to its namesake city of Marikina. In Pasig, the river meets the gates of the Manggahan Floodway, a controlled waterway used to prevent flooding in Manila during heavy rains by diverting most of the water of the Marikina towards Laguna de Bay instead of the Pasig River. Located 6.75 kilometers (4.19 mi) downstream is the confluence of the Marikina and Pasig rivers.

The river's depth ranges from 3 to 21 meters (9.8 to 68.9 ft) and spans from 70 to 120 meters (230 to 390 ft). It has a total area of nearly 75.2 hectares (0.752 km^{2}) and is 27 kilometers (17 mi) long.The riverbank has an elevation of 8 meters above sea level at the boundary of San Mateo and Marikina. This slowly falls to an elevation of around 4 meters (13 ft) before the Malanday and Santo Niño boundary. The lowest elevation is along Calumpang which is 2 meters (6 ft 7 in) above sea level.

=== Tributary waterways ===
The Marikina River has a number of tributaries in the form of creeks and rivers, and at least one former river-section in Marikina's Barangay Tumana from which the original flow of the river has been diverted. These tributaries drain four municipalities and one city in the province of Rizal, and three cities in the Philippines' National Capital Region.

==== Rodriguez, Rizal ====
The biggest of these tributaries are upstream in the more mountainous areas of Rodriguez. This includes the Tayabasan River and Montalban River, the Boso Boso River, and the Wawa River, which meets the Marikina River just upstream of Wawa Dam. Further downstream from the dam, but still in the town of Rodriguez are the Puray River (which flows near Avilon Zoo) and Manga River.

==== Barangka ====
Until this point the river follows a more or less east–west direction until San Jose, Rodriguez, where it takes a sharp north–south turn towards the municipality of San Mateo, where the Ampid River forms the boundary between Barangays Maly and Ampid. At this point across the river in Quezon City, Calamiong Creek drains Barangay Bagong Silang. Further downstream the Nangka River and its own tributary in the Sapang Labo Creek mark the boundary between San Mateo and Marikina.

==== Marikina ====
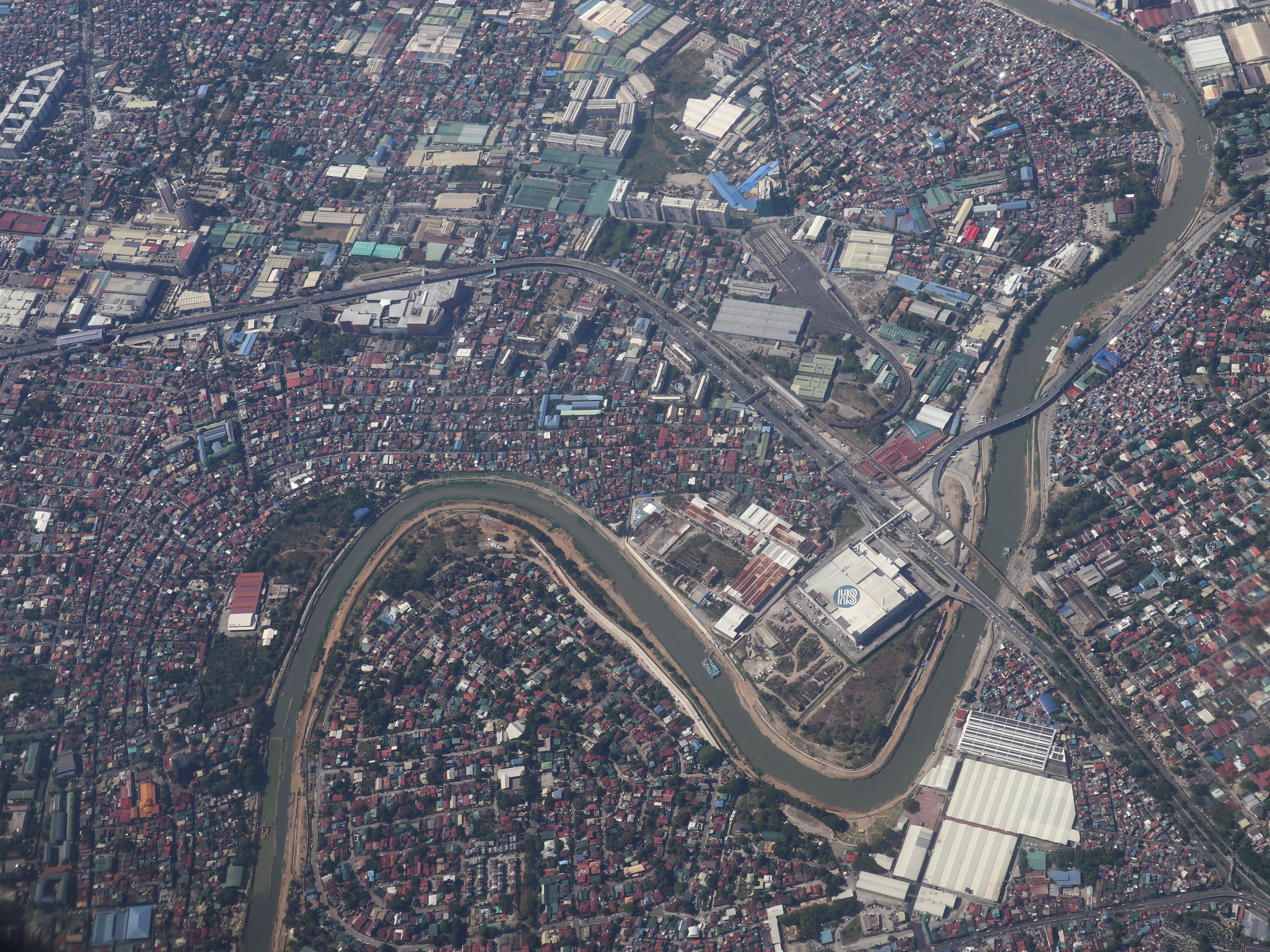
Aerial view of Marikina through Marikina and Pasig

Somewhere north of Brgy. Tumana in Marikina marks a point at which an American Colonial Era levee shifted the flow of Marikina River west, away from the population center of Sitio Bayanbayanan (now known as Concepcion Uno), where erosion had been a problem. The construction of a levee left behind a remnant waterway now known as Patay na Ilog (literally "Dead River", referring to the former path of the river) where the original path of the river once traversed, which rejoins the Marikina River just south of Tumana Bridge. The dredging for this American era levee left behind a large stone outcropping just below water level where the Marikina's children would play, back when the water was still clean, such that this part of the river is still called luksong kabayo.

The name of Barangay Tumana refers to the Tagalog word for a wide level land just above water level. The area was considered ideal for vegetable farming due to the rich riversoil, and the annual inundation of the area by the Marikina River during the rainy season, which prevented crawling insect pests from staying permanently. This area was eventually also used for riversoil quarrying and saw an influx of informal settlers which turned it into a residential area, eventually becoming a separate barangay from Concepcion, with Patay na Ilog forming part of the boundary.

Further south on the Quezon City side Barangay Pansol is drained by Pansol Creek, with headwaters reaching as far up to just behind the University of the Philippines Integrated School campus. Even further south in Barangay Malanday, Marikina, the Lamuan-Bulelak creek also empties into the Marikina River, although its precise mouth area has been blurred by the construction of residential buildings.

==== Adjacent creeks ====
In Marikina, numerous other creeks flow nearby the Marikina River but are not directly connected. These include the Bankaan Creek in Barangay Parang, the Concepcion Creek in Barangay Concepcion Dos, and the Usiw Creek in Barangay Santa Elena. Instead, these waterways are linked in a complex network with the Balanti, Halang, and Muntingdilao Creeks and the Sapang Baho River, eventually emptying into the Manggahan Floodway and Laguna de Bay.

== Ecology ==
Due to neglect and uncontrolled industrial waste, rising pollution of the river had caused alarm that national and local administrations seek to repair. The Marikina River is on a verge of an ecological imbalance as a strange species of fish has dominated its ecosystem. Since the late 1990s, the Marikina River has been dwelt by janitor fish. Before, the river was thriving with the local species martiniko, ayungin and biya.

The growing fish population had prompted the city government to launch a new program to control their number. The city issued Ordinance 004, series of 2007, launching the Janitor Fish Eradication Drive in the city of Marikina, granting cash incentives to participants, appropriating ₱50,000.00 annually for this purpose.

A scientific study of the species found in five locations in the Laguna de Bay tributary system, including the Marikina River, revealed that the specimen of janitor fish previously reported as Hypostomus plecostomus actually belongs to the genus Pterygoplichthys, family Loricariidae. The collected specimens for this study consisted of two species: Pterygoplichthys disjunctivus and Pterygoplichthys pardalis. Both species were collected from the Marikina River. Only the species disjunctivus was collected from the Pasig River.

== Crossings ==
A total of 18 bridges cross the Marikina. The first bridge from the tri-junction with Boso-Boso and Sapa Bute Rivers is the Pacific Bridge, followed by the Rancho Luisito Way Bridge, Eastwood Greenview Bridge, and Phil Rock Spillway Bridge respectively to the south. Then it goes further towards the first government-owned bridge which is the San Jose Bridge.

Crossing over to the border in between Quezon City and San Mateo, Batasan–San Mateo Bridge crosses the route, and then in Marikina it goes towards four bridges, namely Gil Fernando Bridge, Marikina Bridge, Marcos Bridge, and the Line 2 bridge between Santolan station to Katipunan station.

The next bridge downstream towards the border between Quezon City and Marikina is the Macapagal Bridge connecting the cities of Quezon and Marikina. Then it crosses over to another administrative border between Quezon City and Pasig with the Manalo Bridge.

Further downstream, the remaining bridges prior to the river's southern end are all in Pasig wherein the first three are the Bridgetowne Viaduct (crossing within the Bridgetowne development), Rosario Bridge, and Sandoval Bridge. Then the newest bridge, opened in October 2017, is the Kaginhawaan Bridge that connects barangays Poblacion and Ugong in Pasig. Then the last bridges near the Pasig River confluence are the Vargas Bridge and the Santa Rosa de Lima Bridge.

The future expressway bridge is the Metro Manila Skyway. Skyway Stage 4 or Metro Manila Expressway/C-6 as planned serves as a connection road from the Stage 3 in Santa Mesa, Manila to the Batasang Pambansa Complex in Quezon City. The expressway bridge will be built within the city of Marikina, and will serve as a solution to heavy traffic along the Magsaysay Boulevard-Aurora Boulevard-Marikina-Infanta Highway corridor as well as Ortigas Avenue. The project is expected to commence by 2018.

== Significant floods ==
=== Typhoon Ketsana/Ondoy ===
On September 26, 2009, at about 6:00 pm PST, Typhoon Ondoy hit Metro Manila and dumped one month's rainfall in less than 24 hours, causing the Marikina River system, including the Manggahan Floodway, to burst its banks rapidly. Along with flooding along other river systems, 80 percent of the National Capital Region became flooded. Also flooded were 25 nearby provinces. In Metro Manila alone, 20 feet (6.1 m) of dirty water forced people to evacuate their homes. By September 30, at least 450,000 inhabitants had been displaced, with at least 380,000 forced into makeshift shelters; 246 people were reported dead. It is believed that blocked pipes, a poorly maintained sewerage system, and uncollected domestic waste were major factors in the speed with which the flood waters engulfed the surrounding area. This prompted President Gloria Macapagal Arroyo to declare a State of National Calamity and set up a task force to rescue the inhabitants. However, the government was forced to admit that resources were in short supply and called for global assistance. Thereafter, efforts have been made to improve the drainage system for the whole city by fixing the sewers and the new trademarked "Red Sidewalks".

This is the worst storm that Metro Manila has experienced since 1967.

=== Typhoon Meari/Falcon ===
On June 24, 2011, heavy rains of Severe Tropical Storm Meari affected Luzon including Metro Manila. The water level in the Marikina River reached its critical level, flooding beside its riverbanks, just near along the river. However, the water level did not reach its higher banks, into the streets and communities. No casualties were reported but the mud and debris from the river was left by overflowed riverbanks.

=== Typhoon Nesat/Pedring ===
On September 27, 2011, Typhoon Pedring dumped heavy rains like Ondoy over Luzon including Metro Manila and nearby provinces. Marikina's water level reached a higher level than June 24, 2011, reaching 20.1 meters (66 ft) by 5 pm PHT. The flood submerged houses in several barangays of Marikina and San Mateo. SM City Marikina Basement Parking submerged in muddy water. No deaths were recorded in Marikina, but in San Mateo, there is one. The day after, the Marikina River returned in critical level. On September 29, 2011, 5 am, water subsided in the banks of the river and the residents started to clean. At 6 am, water reached 15.2 meters (50 ft).

=== 2012 Southwest Monsoon rains/Habagat ===
Although located hundreds of kilometers away from the Philippines, the southerly flow from Typhoon Haikui in early August 2012 enhanced the southwest monsoon across much of Luzon. As a result, widespread heavy rains impacted regions still recovering from deadly floods triggered by Typhoon Saola less than a week earlier. During a 22‑hour span from August 6–7, 687 millimeters (27.0 in) of rain fell in parts of Metro Manila, leading local media to compare the event to Typhoon Ketsana in 2009, which killed 464 in the city. Some of the most severe flooding took place along the Marikina River, which swelled to near-record levels. During the afternoon of August 7, the river reached a height of 20.6 meters (68 ft), well beyond the flood level of 16 meters (52 ft) and about 3 meters (9.8 ft) below the record level set during Typhoon Ketsana. About 70 percent of Metro Manila was affected by flooding. Some areas were submerged in up to 3 meters (9.8 ft). Due to the expanding floods, officials in the city evacuated more than 23,000 residents from flood-prone areas and relocated them to shelters set up across the area. According to a reporter from the British Broadcasting Corporation, many residents were reluctant to leave their belongings behind, and some traveled back through flood waters to retrieve their belongings. Officials feared the flooding could worsen as the La Mesa Dam continued to overflow at the time. At least nine people were killed and four others were injured in a landslide in Quezon City. More than fifty people died on this day.

This was the worst rain in non-direct typhoon or tropical storm on record that Metro Manila has experienced since 2009, surpassing the accumulated amount of rain brought by Typhoon Ketsana.

=== Typhoon Vamco/Ulysses ===
During the passage of Typhoon Vamco in the Philippines between November 11 to 12, 2020, the Marikina River surpassed the water levels reached by Typhoon Ketsana in 2009, which brought massive rainfall and caused severe flooding. As of 11:00 PHT the river's water level had risen to 22 meters (72 ft), submerging most parts of the city in flood waters, according to the Marikina Public Information Office.

=== Typhoon Gaemi/Carina and Southwest Monsoon rains ===
On July 24, 2024, several areas in Luzon were affected by the heavy rains caused by the strengthening of Typhoon Gaemi and the enhancement of the southwest monsoon. Initial forecasters said that Typhoon Gaemi would not make landfall in the country but moisture from the storm would be drawn into the southwest monsoon and bring heavy rainfall and strong winds to the archipelago. The Marikina River issued its third and highest alarm after it rose to 18.4 meters (60.4 ft). At 14:03 PHT (22:03 UTC) of the same day, the river increased to 20.6 meters (67.6 ft), which exceeded the limit of 20 meters compared to Typhoon Ketsana of 21.5 meters (70.5 ft) according to Marikina Disaster Risk Reduction and Management Office.

As a result of widespread flooding driven by Gaemi and the southwest monsoon, many provinces as well as Metro Manila were placed under a state of calamity. It also led to similar comparisons with Ketsana, which also devastated Metro Manila.

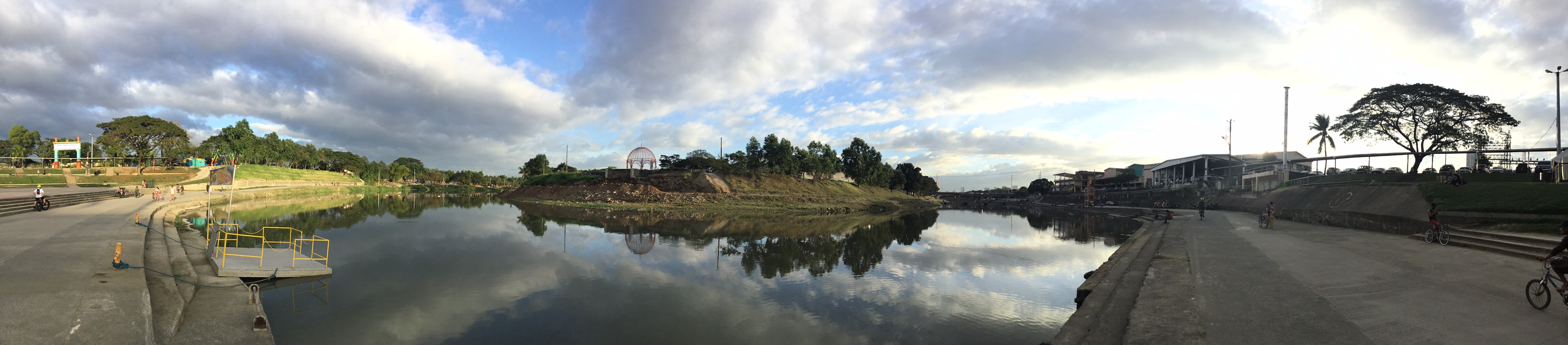
Panorama of Marikina River Park

== See also ==
- List of rivers and esteros in Manila
- Pasig River Ferry Service
- Pasig river rehabilitation
