= Seven Islands =

Seven Islands or Seven Isles may refer to:

- the Ionian Islands in Greece, which are also known as the Heptanese or the Seven Islands
- Seven Islands of Bombay, the seven islands which united to form the island of Bombay
- Seven Islands (West Virginia), a group of seven bar islands in West Virginia, U.S.
- Seven Islands Land Company, a land and timber management holding company of Maine, U.S.
- Seven Islands Republic, a former republic in the Ionian Islands
- Seven Isles (Fort Lauderdale), neighborhood in Fort Lauderdale, Florida, U.S.
- Seven Isles, a fictional archipelago in Narnia

== See also ==
- Sept-Îles (disambiguation)
- Sjuøyane (Seven Islands), part of the Svalbard Archipelago in Arctic Norway
