= Sept-Îles (disambiguation) =

Sept-Îles is a city in Quebec, Canada.

Sept-Îles or Sept Îles may also refer to:

== France ==
- Jentilez, also known as Sept-Îles, a small French archipelago off the north coast of Brittany and an important bird reserve
  - Sept-Îles Lighthouse

== Canada ==
- Sept Îles Lake (Saint-Raymond), a lake in Saint-Raymond, Portneuf Regional County Municipality, Quebec
- Sept Îles Lake (Saint-Ubalde), a lake in Saint-Ubalde, Portneuf Regional County Municipality, Quebec
- Rivière des Sept Îles, a tributary of the Portneuf River in Saint-Raymond and Saint-Basile in Portneuf Regional County Municipality, Quebec
