= Bernardo Carpio =

Philippine Mythological cause of earthquakes

- Bernardo Carpio story as depicted in the comics.
- Gender: Male
- Region: Philippines

Equivalents
- Asturias: Bernardo del Carpio

Bernardo Carpio is a legendary figure in Philippine mythology who is said to be the cause of earthquakes. There are numerous versions of this tale. Some versions say Bernardo Carpio is a giant, as supported by the enormous footsteps he has reputedly left behind in the mountains of Montalban. Others say he was the size of an ordinary man. Accounts of the stories have pre-colonial origins, but the name of the hero was Hispanized during the Spanish colonization. The original name of the hero has been lost in time. All versions of the story agree that Bernardo Carpio had a strength that was similar to that of many strong men-heroes in Asian epics, such as Lam-ang.

== Pre-colonial origin ==
According to Pedro Chirino, the ancient Tagalogs believed that an earthquake is nothing more than the effect of the movements of a huge animal in the entrails of the earth which according to some, is an alligator or crocodile. The ancient Tagalogs held the crocodiles in the greatest veneration and when they saw one in the water they cried out in all subjection, "Nono" (Nuno) meaning "grandfather". The birds called tigmamanok (white-collared kingfisher) are considered very sacred because they are permitted to pick a crocodile's teeth without harm. The Pasig River had a large rock (Buayang Bato – Stone Crocodile) that served as an idol for many years, they leave offering to it whenever they pass by, until the fathers of St. Augustine broke it into small bits and set up a cross in its place. Soon a small shrine or chapel, with an image of St. Nicolas of Tolentino, was built in that place. Some of the documented old Tagalog curses includes: Kainin ka nang buaya! (May a crocodile eat you!) and Lamunin ka nang lindol! (May the earthquake swallow you up!). It is clear that Bernardo Carpio is the hispanized avatar of the god of earthquakes. This human-like image of the earthquake god contrast with that of some monster hidden in the depths of the earth that is reminiscent of the dragon(s) of the Chinese. San Buenaventura (1663:76) conflate the underworld crocodile with the Devil and used it to threatened his congregation, calling it manunungab na buwaya sa impierno (the devouring crocodile of hell). In a legend about the miraculous conversion to Catholicism of a sangley (Chinese), the Buwayang Bato of the Pasig River was said to be the Devil petrified by San Nicolas. This legend was featured in the third chapter of Jose Rizal's El Filibusterismo (1891).

In Tagalog and Visayan creation myth, it was the 'earthquake' who advised the first man and woman to mate and people the earth. The name of the Tagalog deity Dian Masalanta (devastating deity), the patron of lovers and of generation (procreation), could be a reference to the destructive effect of the earthquake. In some version of the creation myth, the earthquake is not personified but rather caused by Bathala Meycapal, the supreme being himself. Professor of Anthropology Fay-Cooper Cole identified the Mandayan supreme gods—father and son—Mansilatan (the creator) and Batla (the preserver), with the Tagalog deities Dian Masalanta and Bathala Meycapal respectively. He also noted that Todlai, the god of marriage of the Bagobo people, is sometimes addressed as Maniládan. Among the ancient Tagalogs there existed a doctrine—which is sowed by the Devil according to Chirino—that a woman, whether married or single, could not be saved, who did not have some lover. They said that this man, in the other world, hastened to offer the woman his hand at the passage of a very perilous stream which had no other bridge than a very narrow beam, which may be traversed to reach the repose that they call Kaluwálhatian i.e. Bathala Meycapal's abode. Hence, virginity was not recognized or esteemed among them; rather they considered it as a misfortune or humiliation.

Another possible pre-colonial origin of Bernardo Carpio is Palangíyi, the ancient (legendary/mythical) king of the Tagalog people. During the Spanish period, Palangíyi (N&S 1860:228) was simply an endearing name used by mothers to address their baby sons: Palangí ko "My rainbow, my little king." The suffix -y of N&S's palanğiy simply seems to indicate the pragmatic lengthening of the final /i/. {N&S 1754:385: PALANĞIY. pp. Palabra de cariño que dice la Madre à su chiquillo, porque dizen que los Tagalos tuvieron vn Rey llamado Palanğiyi, y asi Palanğiy co, querra dezir mi Rey.}. This hapax cannot be related either to the stem lángi "disappearance" or to the stem langí "dessicated," particularly not to the latter because of the curse derived from it: Palangíi ká! "Get dessicated!" {N&S 1754:385: PALANĞIY. pp. Maldicion. Zacate, como rama de arbol. Vide Lanğiy, y sus juegos.} [In this expression, the final -i is the Classical Tagalog ending of the imperative.]. Sir John Bowring mentioned in his book "The Philippine Islands," that the friar F. de los Santos is very angry with the nonsense (boberias and disparates) which he says the natives address to their children. A mother will call her babe father, and mother, and aunt, and even king and queen, sir and madam, with other extravagant and unbecoming outbreaks of affection, which he reproves as altogether blameworthy and intolerable.

The name Palangíyi was derived from Malais term Palángi "rainbow" (Fav. 2:137) [Per. péleng "leopard, spotted" (Des. 1:414) > Mal. paláng "spotted; motley, multi-coloured" (Fav. 2:137) > Mal. palángi "multi-coloured" > +Chin. gōng "arc" (Harbaugh 1998:179) > Mal. kúwung "arc" > Mal. kúwung palángi "multi-coloured arc > rainbow" (Fav. 1:281) > Mal. palángi "rainbow," e.g. Kalihátan palángi ítu dálam áwan "The rainbow appears among the clouds." (Fav. 2:137).]. A senior Filipino chieftain wore a multi-colored bahag (loin cloth), and the common name for the rainbow is bahag-hari, which means either "king's bahag" or "sun's bahag" — in the latter case a Tagalog-Malay compound from Mal. hári "day" (Fav. 1:159) < Sans. hári "the sun" (MW 1289^{3}). Therefore, it is not surprising a king would have been named or nicknamed Tag. palángi "rainbow." The name Hari was also used to refer to the supreme being, hence the expression harinawa "God willing." In the province of Bulacan, the rainbow is believed to be the belt or g-string of Bathala Meycapal.

Bernardo Carpio belong to the king-in-the-mountain motif, wherein the king is not dead, but asleep in the cave, and will wake up one day to deliver his country from its oppressors. The king is often represented as a giant. The problem is that the Tagalogs had no king, although they had a term for it in so far as Spanish lexicographers translate Tag. hárì as Span. rey. They were ruled by feudal lords (dátò) independent from one another, although certainly associated in feudal polities. The first king mentioned in the Tagalog area are the Bruneians of Manila, at the arrival of Legazpi (1570). They bore the title of Sans. Rāja "king" (MW 872^{3}), tagalized as ladyâ (N&S 1860:163). The author Jean-Paul G. Potet contemplated the hypothesis that Tag. palangíi might mean "white man" [Ger. Frank; Ar. Farang "European"; Mal. Pringgi/Paranggi "white man", Përanjís "French"; Tong. Palanggi "white man"; Siam. Fàràng "Occidental, Westerner, French"] because a claim was made by José N. Sevilla and Paul R. Verzosa, in their Ağ aklat nğ Tagalog (1923), that the Philippines had a dynasty descended from Alexander the Great and an Indian princess ("Genealogy of the Philippine Imperial Family", pp. 33–41) whose most famous Malay member would be Nakoda Ragam (1485-1524), Sultan of Brunei under the name Bolkiah, and whose father was a certain Juru Shah Bundar who migrated to Java and married a Javanese princess.

In 1847 Apolinario dela Cruz of Tayabas (Hermano Pule) was crowned by his followers as "King of the Tagalogs," a title reminiscent of the legendary king Bernardo Carpio. Members of Ciudad Mistica de Dios—one of the most revered groups in Banahaw—believed that their founder, Maria Bernarda Balitaan (1876-1925), was the incarnation of both the Infinito Dios and Bernardo Carpio.

== Basic legend ==
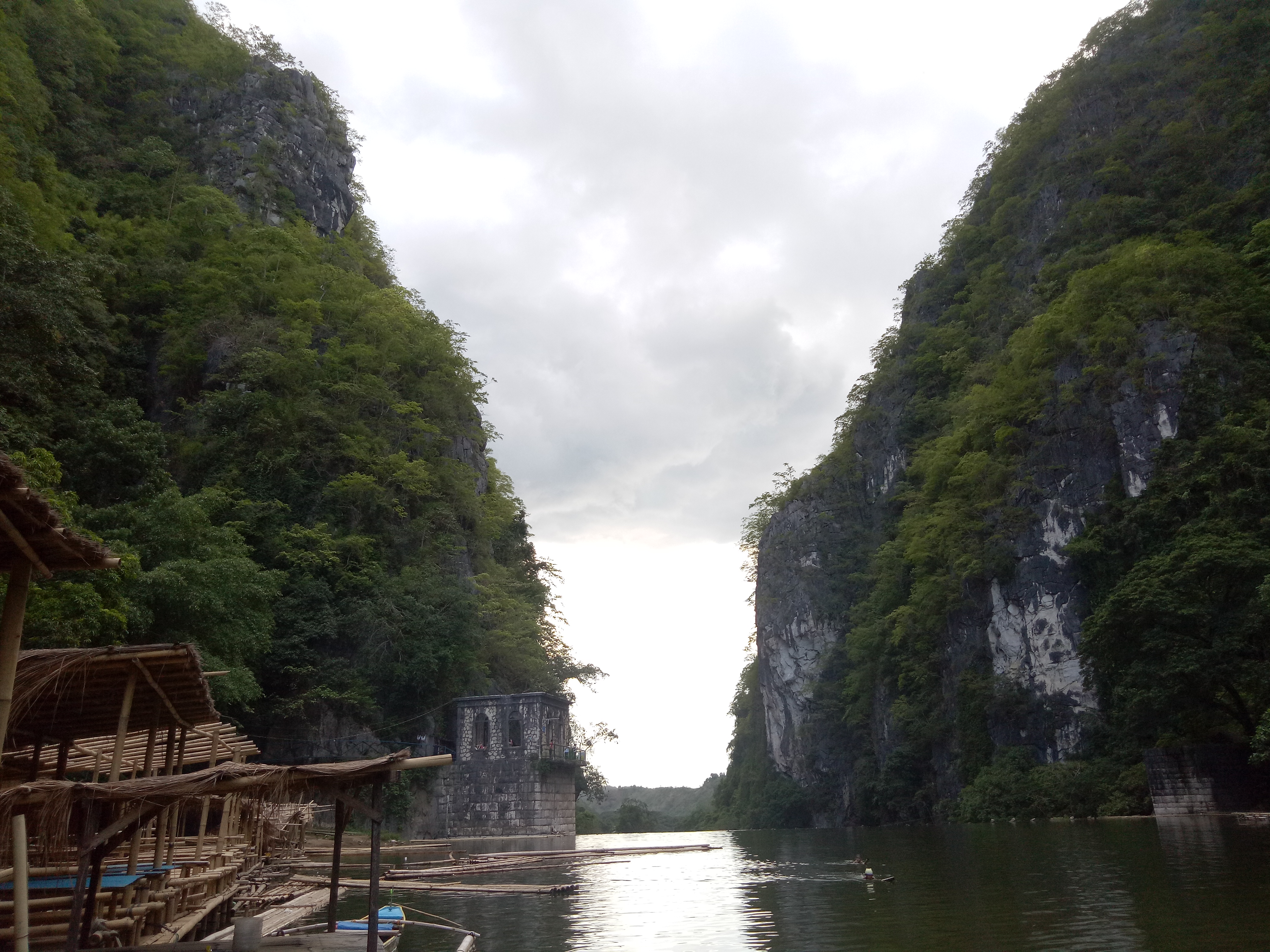
The Montalban Gorge (Pamitinan Protected Landscape) is well known as a setting of the legend of Bernardo Carpio

The basic form of the legend is that Bernardo Carpio, a being of great strength, is trapped in between two great rocks in the Mountains of Montalban.

Some versions say he is keeping the mountains from crashing into each other (similar to the Greek titan Atlas holding up the sky), and some versions say he is trapped and trying to break free. When Bernardo Carpio shrugs his shoulder, an earthquake occurs.

== As a revolutionary against Spanish occupation ==
According to one version of the tale, Bernardo Carpio was a son of Infante Jimena and Don Sancho Díaz of Cerdenia. The Infante was cloistered by her brother King Alfonso, who at that time was very powerful, because of her forbidden love with Don Sancho. Don Sancho was incarcerated, and his eyes were to be plucked out. Bernardo was left to the care of Don Rubio, who divulged the love affair.

The Spanish hired a local engkantado (shaman) and conspired to trap Carpio through supernatural means. Calling for a parley, they lured him towards a cave in the mountains of Montalban. The engkantado used his agimat (talisman), and Bernardo Carpio was caught between two boulders which the shaman had caused to grind each other. The legend says he was not killed, but was trapped between these two boulders, unable to escape because the talisman's power was as great as his own strength.

When Carpio's allies arrived at the cave to rescue him, they were blocked from the cave by a series of cave ins that killed several of them.

People soon surmised that whenever an earthquake happens, it is caused by Bernardo Carpio trying to free himself from the mountain.

=== Etymology ===
The same version says that Bernardo Carpio demonstrated unusual strength, even as a child. As a result, the parish priest who baptised him suggested that his parents name him after the Spanish legendary hero Bernardo del Carpio. This became a foreshadowing of the legendary life Carpio himself would lead.

== As symbolism of freedom from the U.S. and Japan ==
Damiana Eugenio was able to find and document a 1940 compilation of tales detailing the legend of Bernardo Carpio. It specifically says that:

"Bernardo Carpio is considered the savior of the Filipinos against national oppression and enslavement".

According to that particular telling of the tale, when the last link on the chains binding Carpio is broken, "the enslavement and oppression of the Filipino race will be replaced with freedom and happiness." While this belief apparently referred to the Spanish Occupation of the Philippines and the later occupation by the Philippines by the U.S. and by Japan in World War II, the legend has continued to be told this way, an apparent reference to freedom from poverty rather than foreign domination.

Filipino revolutionary heroes Jose Rizal and Andres Bonifacio are said to have paid homage to the Bernardo Carpio legend - the former by making a pilgrimage to Montalban, and the latter making the caves of Montalban the secret meeting place for the Katipunan movement.

== As an etiological myth ==
The tale of Bernardo Carpio can be considered an etiological myth which explains the occurrence of earthquakes. The area which hosts the legend of Bernardo Carpio is also home to the West Valley Fault System (formerly called the Marikina Valley Fault System).

== In popular literature ==
- Lav Diaz's 2016 film A Lullaby to the Sorrowful Mystery (Filipino: Hele Sa Hiwagang Hapis) prominently features a tikbalang (played as a triune being played by Bernardo Barnardo, Cherie Gil, and Angel Aquino) which is revealed to be the engkanto who made a deal with the Spanish rulers to bind Bernardo Carpio, effectively allowing the Spanish to rule over the leaderless people. Towards the end of the film, however, the Tikbalang reveals that it/they never chained up Bernardo Carpio because he is just a myth, noting that it is foolish to hope for salvation from a figment of the imagination.
