= Hundred Islands National Park =

National park in northern Philippines

- IUCN category II (national park)
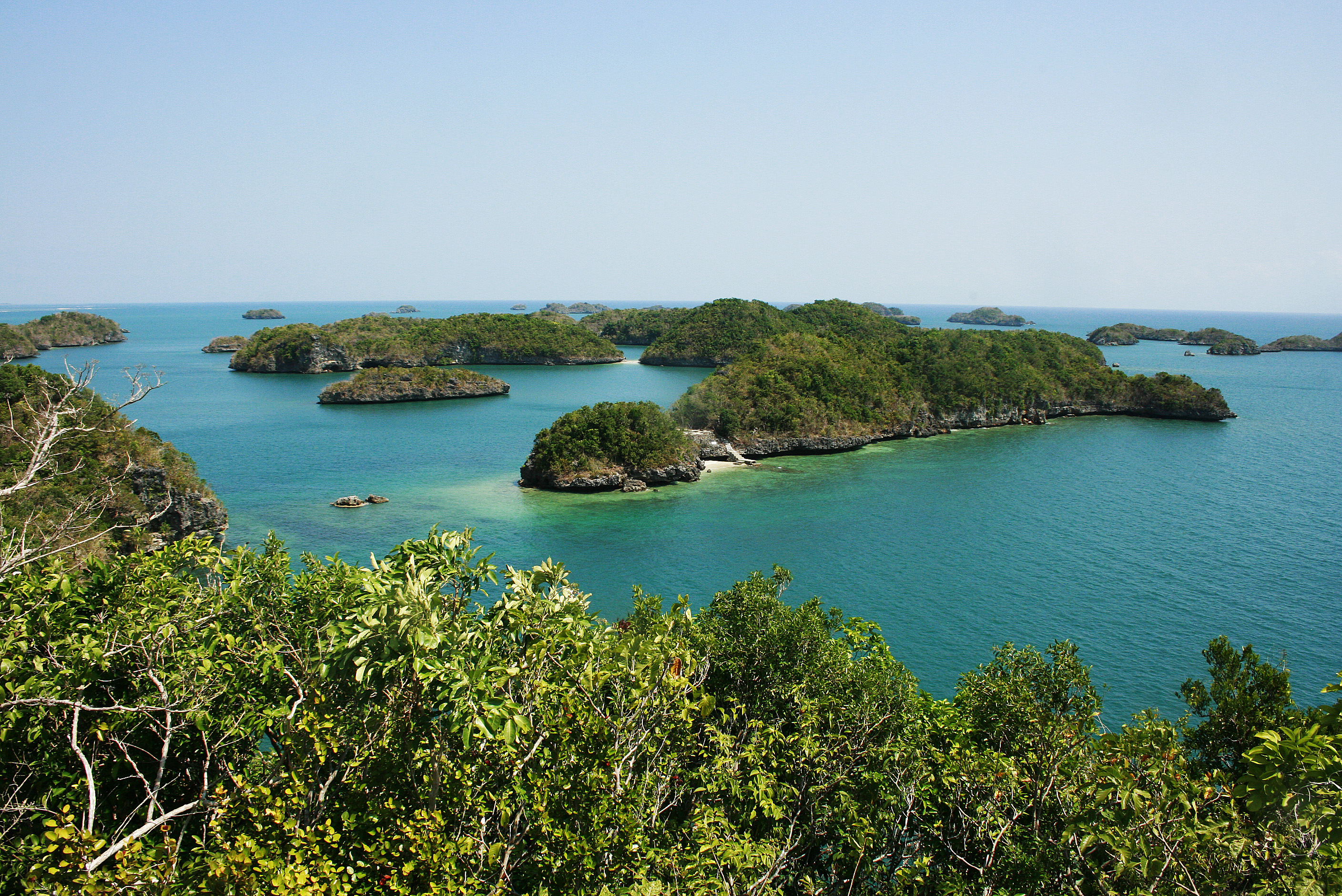

- Location within Luzon Location within Philippines
- Location: Philippines
- Nearest city: Alaminos, Pangasinan
- Coordinates: 16°12′N 120°2′E
- Area: 1,844 ha (7.12 sq mi)
- Established: January 18, 1940
- Governing body: Department of Environment and Natural Resources
- Website: www.hundredislands.ph (No longer valid)
- Hundred Islands
- Interactive map of Hundred Islands
- Archipelago: Luzon
- Adjacent to: Lingayen Gulf
- Total islands: 123–124
- Major islands: Governor Island; Quezon Island; Children's Island

The Hundred Islands National Park is the first Philippine national park and a protected area located in Alaminos, Pangasinan. The islands, totaling 124 at low tide and 123 at high tide, are scattered in Lingayen Gulf covering an area of 16.76 square kilometres (6.47 sq mi). Only four of them had been developed for tourism: Quezon Island (the most developed), Governor Island, Children's Island, and Pilgrimage Island.

== Geology ==
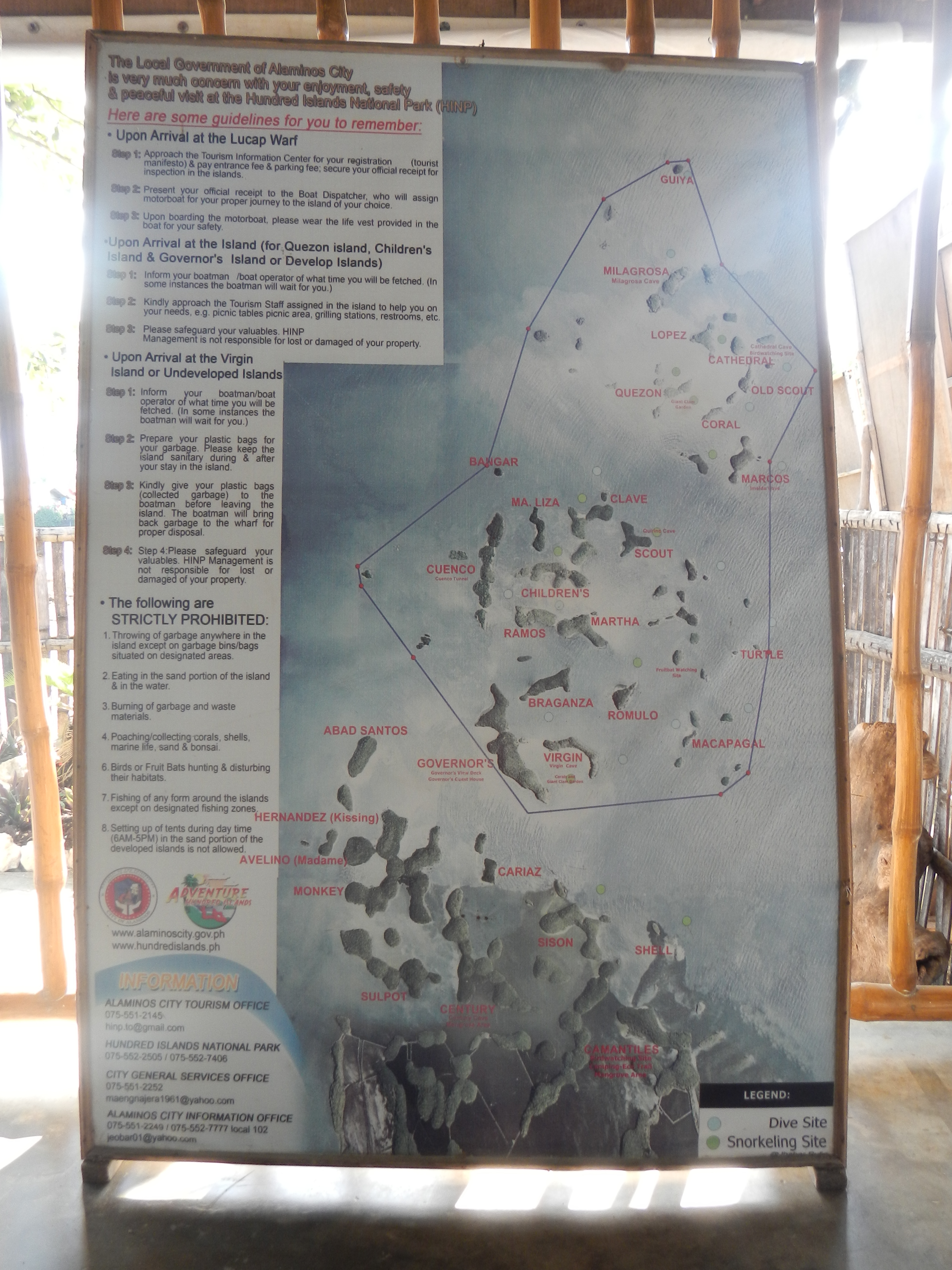
Map of the Hundred Islands National Park

The islands are of karst or limestone landscape. The islands are believed to be about two million years old. Ancient coral formations can be found extending well inland, in areas that were once part of the seabed of a prehistoric sea. A drop in sea level over time exposed these corals at the surface. The peculiar "mushroom-like" shapes of some of the islands were caused by the eroding action of ocean waves.

== History ==
The national park was created by Presidential Proclamation No. 667, covering an area of 16.76 square kilometres (6.47 sq mi) and signed by President Manuel L. Quezon on January 18, 1940, for the benefit and enjoyment of the people of the Philippines and known as the Hundred Islands National Park (HINP). The Republic Act No. 3655 signed on June 22, 1962, created the Hundred Islands Conservation and Development Authority (HICDA), for the conservation, development and management of HINP. The park including Lucap Bay was transferred from HICDA to the Philippine Tourism Authority (PTA) by virtue of Section 35 of Presidential Decree No. 564 signed by President Ferdinand Marcos on October 2, 1974.

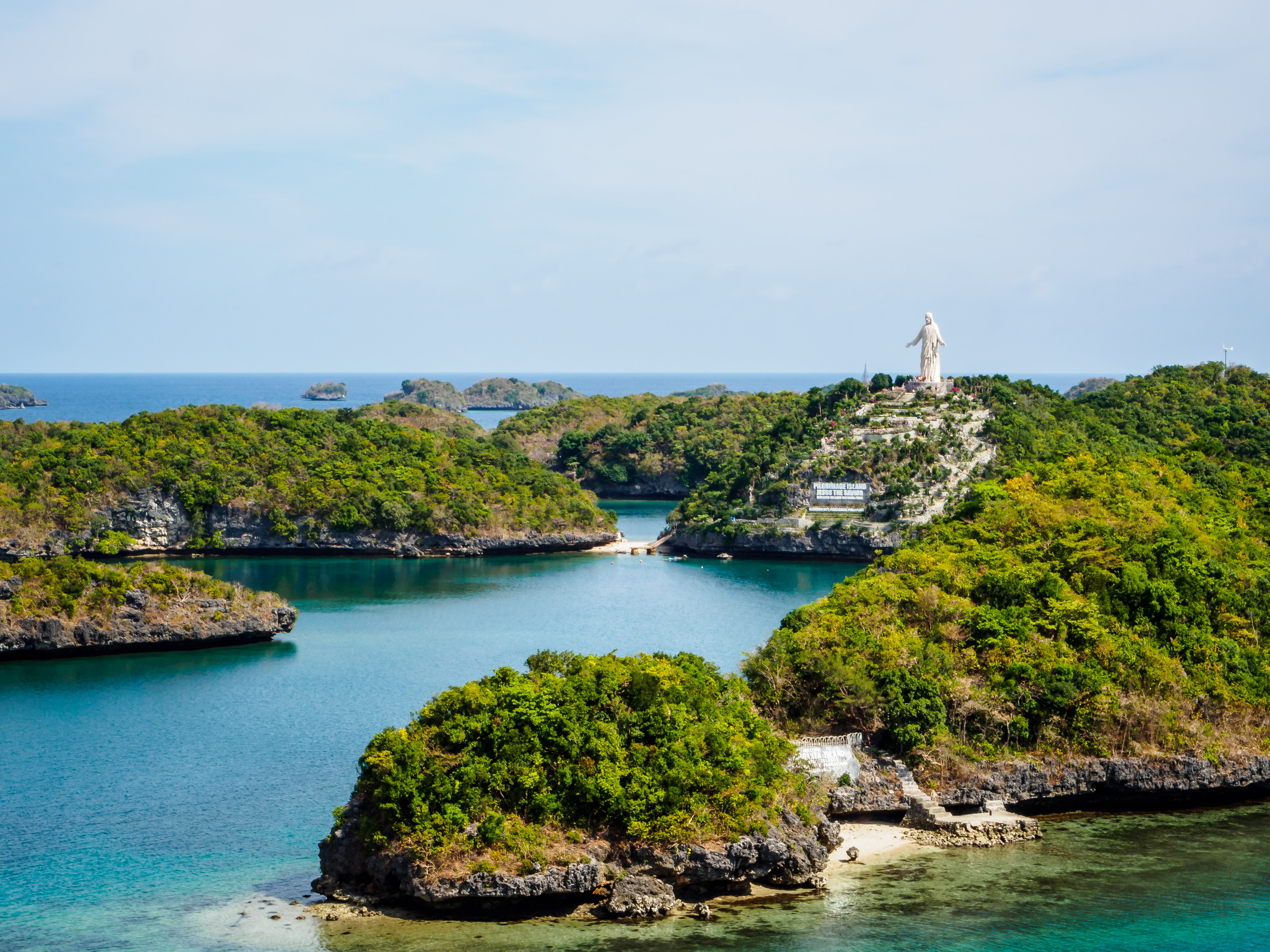
A 55-foot (17 m)-tall statue of Christ the Savior sits atop Pilgrimage Island, which was developed as a pilgrimage site.

On April 27, 1982, under Proclamation No. 2183, the national park including Lucap Bay and its foreshore areas, beginning from Sitio Telbang to the east to Sitio Recudo to the west, were declared as a Tourist Zone and Marine Reserve under the control and administration of the PTA. Subsequently, under the Presidential Proclamation No. 2237 enacted on November 6, 1982, the parcels of land reserve for the Marine Fisheries Multi-Purpose Farm (created under Proclamation No. 1282 of June 21, 1974) were withdrawn and were also placed under the control and supervision of the Tourism Authority for development purposes.

In 2001, the National Committee on Geological Sciences declared the site as National Geological Monument. Executive Order No. 436 signed by President Gloria Macapagal Arroyo on June 21, 2005, transferred the administration, management, maintenance, and operation of the whole Hundred Islands National Park (HINP), including all the activities, facilities, and improvements thereafter, from the Philippine Tourism Authority (PTA) to the city government of Alaminos, Pangasinan in pursuit of Republic Act No. 7160, otherwise known as the Local Government Code of 1991, which encouraged the transfer of power and authority from the national government to local government units, in line with the government's devolution program mandated by the Constitution.

== Fauna ==
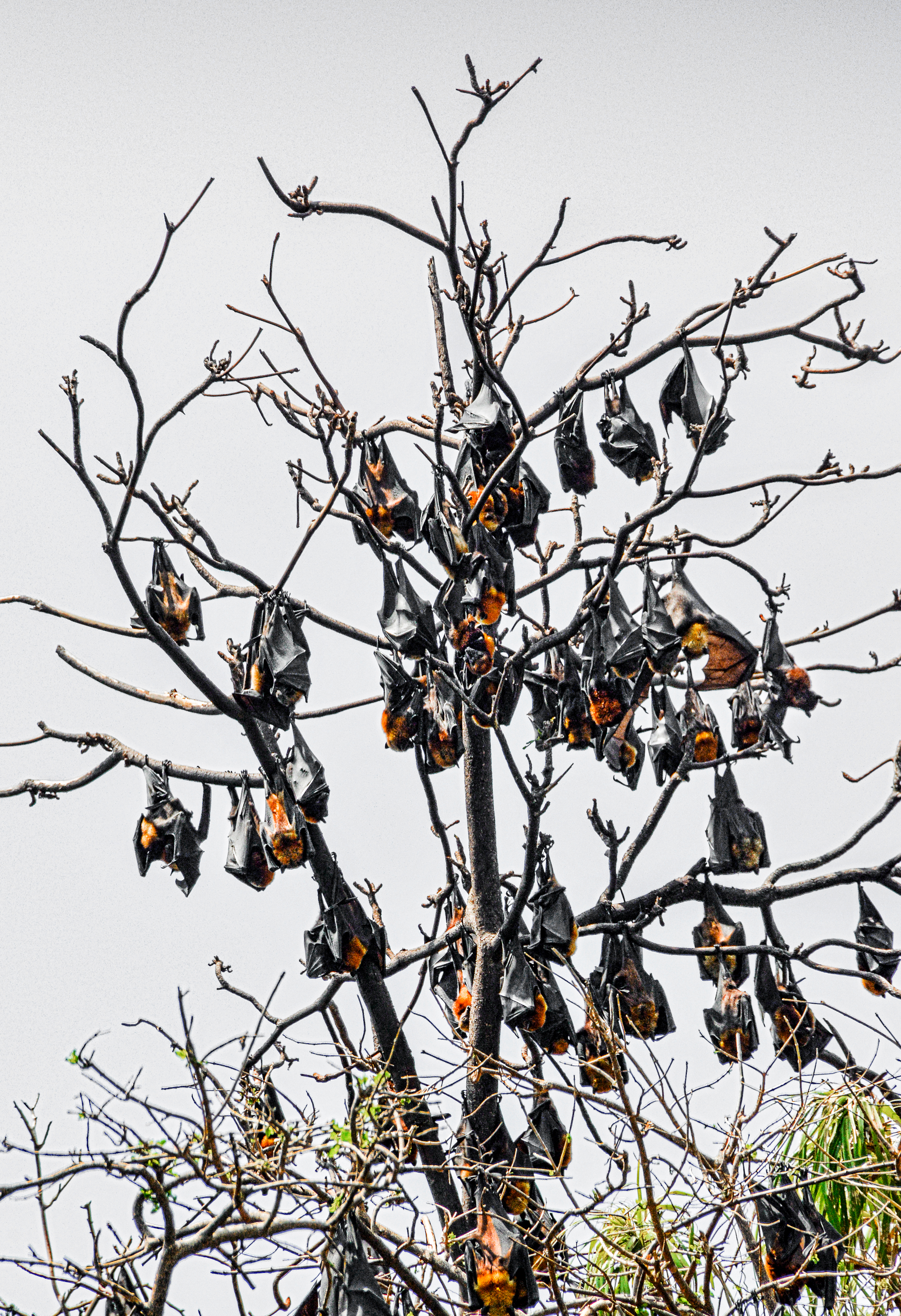
Bats at the Hundred Islands

The vegetation of many of the islands remain intact due to the islands' rugged and inaccessible terrain. Beach forest species, such as Terminalia, and agoho (Casuarina equisetifolia), are most abundant in the islands. Other abundant trees include Molave (Vitex parviflora), malaikmo (Celtis philippensis), and sablot (Litsea glutinosa), commonly found in forests within limestone or karst landscapes. Some exotic species are also present; among these are the fire tree (Delonix regia), calachuchi (Plumeria acuminata), atis (Annona squamosa), sineguelas (Spondias purpurea), sampaloc (Tamarindus indica), and ipil-ipil (Leucaena leucocephala). Species of legumes (Fabaceae), and figs (Ficus) were also recorded in small islands.

The Sagip Lingayen Gulf Project is a study done in 2010, implemented by the Marine Environment and Resources Foundation Inc. and funded by the Dutch government, in response to the lack of resources on the terrestrial wildlife of the islands. The study assessed and created an inventory of the flora and fauna of the islands to help the city government create an environmental monitoring program to protect the island's biodiversity.

The wildlife in this place includes bird such as the Philippine duck, white-eared brown-dove, Philippine hawk-cuckoo, Philippine coucal, Philippine bulbul, elegant tit, lemon-throated leaf-warbler, and the grey-backed tailorbird; fish such as thresher sharks, angelfish, and butterflyfish; and crustaceans such as ghost crabs and hermit crabs.

== See also ==
- List of islands of the Philippines
- List of national parks of the Philippines
- List of protected areas of the Philippines
