= Two Islands National Park =

National park in Queensland, Australia

- IUCN category II (national park)
- Location within Queensland
- Location: Queensland
- Nearest city: Cooktown
- Coordinates: 15°01′19″S 145°26′34″E
- Area: 15 ha (37 acres)
- Established: 1939
- Governing body: Queensland Parks and Wildlife Service
- Website: http://www.nprsr.qld.gov.au/parks/three-islands/index.html

Two Islands and Two Islands Reef are part of the Three Islands Group National Park in Far North Queensland, Australia, in the Coral Sea, 1,590 km (990 mi) northwest of Brisbane, about 50 km (31 mi) north-northeast of Cooktown, 10 km (6.2 mi) southeast of Cape Flattery, and 10 km (6.2 mi) north of Three Islands and Three Islands Reef.

The islands are located within the Great Barrier Reef Marine Park Authority, and are important and protected seabird nesting sites.

== See also ==
- Protected areas of Queensland
