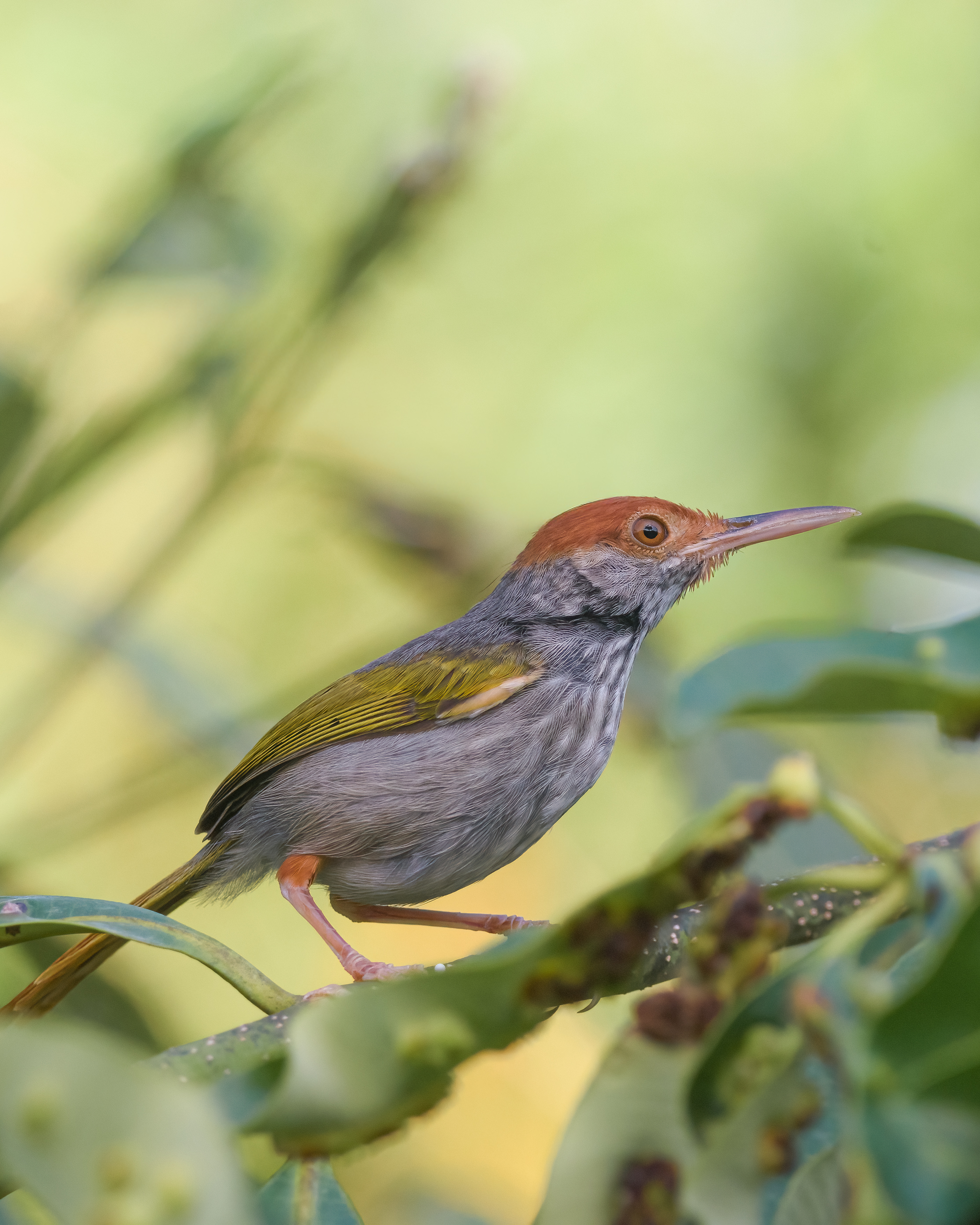
- O. d. derbianus from Luzon

Conservation status
- Least Concern (IUCN 3.1)

Scientific classification
- Kingdom: Animalia
- Phylum: Chordata
- Class: Aves
- Order: Passeriformes
- Family: Cisticolidae
- Genus: Orthotomus
- Species: O. derbianus

Binomial name
- Orthotomus derbianus Moore, F, 1855

= Grey-backed tailorbird =

Species of bird

The gray-backed tailorbird (Orthotomus derbianus) is a species of bird formerly placed in the "Old World warbler" assemblage, but now placed in the family Cisticolidae. It is endemic to the Philippines and found only on the islands of Luzon and Catanduanes.

== Description and taxonomy ==
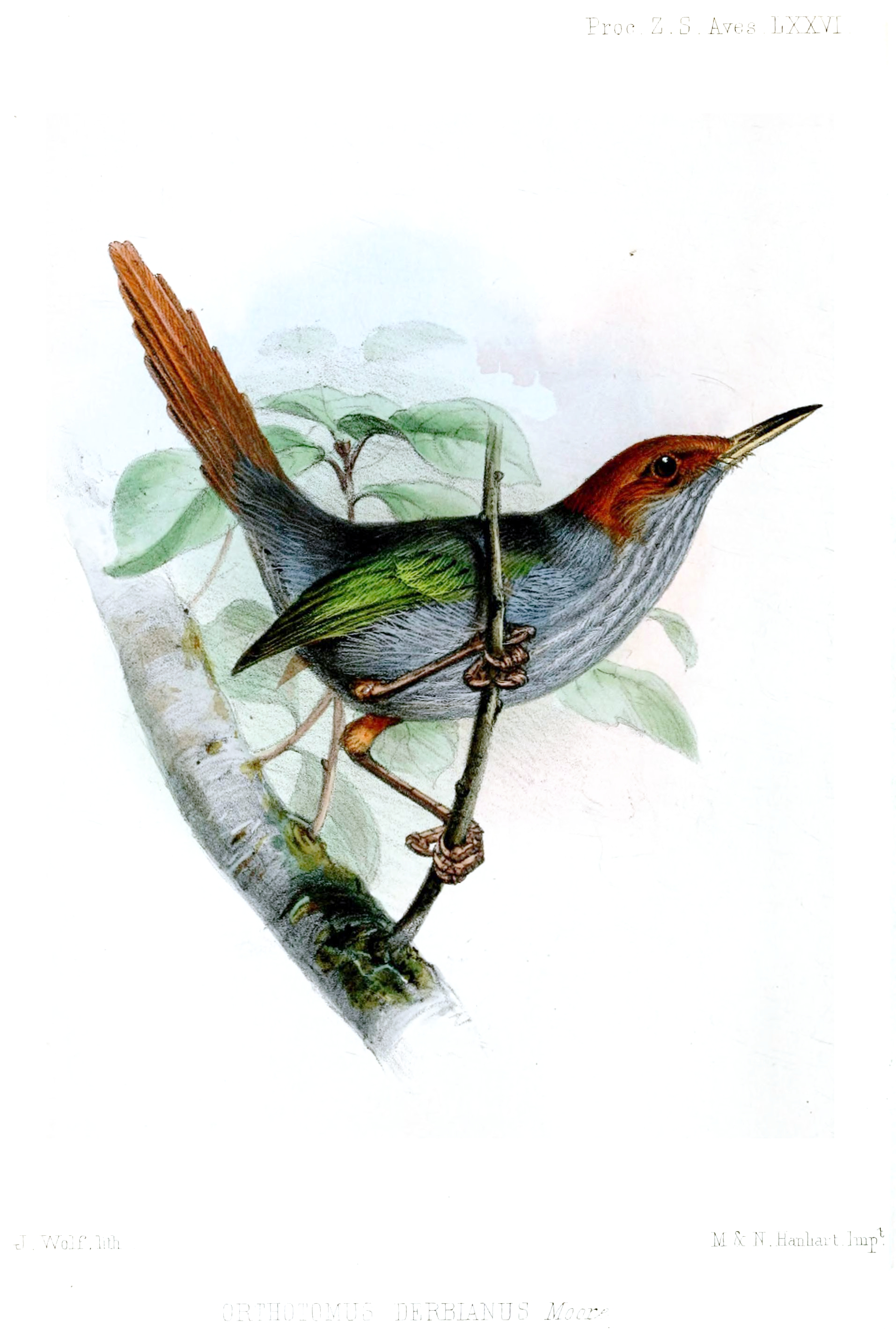
An illustration by Joseph Wolf

=== Subspecies ===
Two subspecies are recognized:

- O. d. derbianus - Central and South Luzon
- O. d. nilesi - Catanduanes

In 1958, a specimen was collected on Palawan and there have been no records on the island since. It is presumed to be a result of some aberrant movement or an error.

== Ecology and behavior ==
It is known to feed on small invertebrates. Usually seen foraging in dense undergrowth, typically in pairs. There is no breeding information on this bird aside from a reported nest in March.

== Habitat and conservation ==
It is endemic to the Philippines, ranging across most of the islands. Its natural habitats are tropical moist lowland forest and tropical moist montane forest as high as 2,480 meters above sea level.

It is assessed as a Least-concern species by the International Union for Conservation of Nature as it is fairly common in its range and tolerant of disturbed habitat.
