= Three Islands National Park =

National park in Queensland, Australia

- IUCN category II (national park)
- Location within Queensland
- Location: Queensland
- Nearest city: Cooktown
- Coordinates: 15°06′S 145°25′E
- Area: 40 ha (99 acres)
- Established: 1939
- Governing body: Queensland Parks and Wildlife Service
- Website: Official website

Three Islands and Three Islands Reef are part of the Three Islands Group National Park in Far North Queensland, Australia, in the Coral Sea, 1,581 km (982 mi) northwest of Brisbane, about 44 km (27 mi) north-northeast of Cooktown.

The Three Islands Group National Park comprises Three Islands, Two Islands and Rocky Islets, a group of eight islands. They are all located within the Great Barrier Reef Marine Park Authority.

- Three Islands consists of islands (a), (b) and (c) and are about 15 km north-east of Cape Bedford and 44 km north-north-east of Cooktown.
- Two Islands is about 10 km east-south-east of Cape Flattery (the closest settlement) and about 54 km north-east of Cooktown and consists of islands (a) and (b).
- The most northern sub-group, Rocky Islets, has three islands (a), (b) and (c) and is about 17 km north-east of Cape Flattery and 72 km north-east of Cooktown.

The islands are important and protected seabird nesting sites. Access to the Rocky Islets is prohibited, and camping is only permitted on Two Islands (a) — between 1 April and 31 August. A maximum of 10 people for up to 14 days is permitted.

== See also ==
- Protected areas of Queensland
