= Thousand Islands (disambiguation) =

Thousand Islands is an archipelago that straddles the Canada–U.S. border in the Saint Lawrence River

Thousand Islands may refer to:

== Places ==
=== Islands ===
- Thousand Islands (Indonesia), a chain of islands in Jakarta, Indonesia
- Thousand Islands, Cocoa Beach, a group of islands in Cocoa Beach, Florida, United States
- Thousand Islands (Svalbard), a group of islands south of Edge Island, part of the Svalbard archipelago
- Kuril Islands, in Russia's Sakhalin Oblast region, known as the "Thousand-Island Archipelago" or Chishima rettō in Japanese

=== Other places ===
- Rivière des Mille Îles (Thousand Islands River), a river channel off Montreal in Quebec, Canada
- Qiandao Lake, (Thousand Islands Lake), in Zhejiang, China
- Thousand Island Lake, lake in Madera County, California, United States

== Other uses ==
- Thousand Island dressing, a salad dressing
- Thousand Islands Bridge, a bridge between Ontario, Canada and New York, US

== See also ==
- Mille-Îles (disambiguation)
