= Don Bosco Technical Institute of Makati =

Roman Catholic school in Makati, Philippines

- Forming Good Christians and Upright Citizens

Location
- Don Chino Roces Avenue, Barangay Pio del Pilar; Makati, Metro Manila; Philippines; 14°33′1.34″N 121°0′50.69″E

Information
- Type: Private Catholic Non-profit All-boys Basic education institution
- Motto: Meliora Eligo (Latin); Choose the better things (English)
- Religious affiliations: Roman Catholic (Salesians)
- Established: 1954; 72 years ago
- Founder: Salesians of the Society of Saint John Bosco
- Rector: Fr. Abner M. Santos, SDB
- Principal: Mr. Alfredo A. Lozanta Jr. (High School); Mr. Ace H. Dulce (Elementary)
- Faculty: approx. 300
- Enrollment: approx. 3,000
- Campus: Urban, 40,000 m^{2} (430,000 sq ft)
- Color: Black - Gold - Gray
- Athletics conference: MILO Best Pasarelle, SBP, PRADA, MSSA, CEAP, PAYA,
- Mascot: Wolf named Grigio
- Nickname: Bosconian
- Newspaper: The Braga Gazette (Senior High School); The Bosconian Journal & Tanglaw Busko (Junior High School); The Bosconian Gazette (Elementary)
- Affiliations: PAASCU, TESDA
- Website: donboscomakati.edu.ph

The institute's Alma Mater Hymn

Don Bosco Technical Institute of Makati, Inc. (also known as DBTI - Makati or simply Don Bosco Makati), is a private Catholic educational institution established in 1954 in Makati City. The institution is owned and operated by the Salesians of Don Bosco (SDB). Its campus is located at Chino Roces Avenue, Makati, Metro Manila, Philippines.

== History ==
On June 27, 1952, Fr. Carlo Braga, SDB met with Alfonso Zobel de Ayala and Joseph R. McMicking. The three discussed the foundation of an industrial school in Makati. The Salesians proposed to establish a "boys' club", noting that they preferred to work in a highly populated area to "raise the moral outlook of a difficult section of a community and provide a source of employment for their students after completing their stuidies." The Ayalas were willing to help the Salesians as their plans included building a "balanced community" composed of people from various socioeconmic statuses.

Less than two years later, on January 26, 1954, the cornerstone of Don Bosco Makati was laid down after Fr. Luigi Ferrari, SDB, asked permission from Alfonso Zobel de Ayala to "occupy and fence the parcel of land located at the corner of Pasay-McKinley Road and the proposed Pasong Tamo Extension" during the term of then, Servant of God Fr. Carlo Braga, SDB, as Provincial. At the same year, construction of the first building was completed which housed the chapel, the convent, a youth center, and the auditorium.

Salesian priests namely Fr. Quaranta, Fr. Jua, Fr. Righetti, Fr. Patrick Ryan, and Br. Nicolino Tambascia started to work at the Youth Center. In January 1955, Religious clubs, youth groups and catechism classes were formed. In June of the same year, the Grade School edifice was built. Enrollees for Grades V, VI and for first year in the secondary level were accepted. In 1956, the first thirty-six (36) Grade VI pupils were the first graduates from Don Bosco Makati. The same pupils also became the first high school graduates under the academic and technical dual-curriculum.

The Manpower Training Department (MTD) was established in 1971, aiming to help the youth acquire employable skills. Presently, it is known as the Technical Vocational Education and Training (TVET) center. The TVET Department has expanded since 2006, partnering with local and international industries.

The institution is accredited by the Philippine Accrediting Association of Schools, Colleges and Universities. The High School Department received its first three-year Level 1 Deregulated Status in 2004. In 2015, the Elementary Department received a Level III re-accredited status followed by the High School Department receiving a Level II re-accredited status in 2016. This milestone coincided with the implementation of the Senior High School program; the institution initially offered the Accountancy, Business, and Management (ABM) and Science, Technology, Engineering, and Mathematics (STEM) strands. By 2018, the first batch of Senior High School students graduated. In the same year, the Junior High School (JHS) and Senior High School (SHS) units became separate departments, later remerging in 2024.

The institution has celebrated its milestone jubilees over the years. In 2004, the school celebrated its golden jubilee. In 2014, the school celebrated its diamond jubilee, highlighted by the groundbreaking and construction of the Fr. Carlo Braga Building for the Senior High School program, and a Eucharistic Celebration presided by Cardinal Luis Antonio Tagle, Archbishop of Manila. In 2024, the school celebrated its platinum jubilee with a Eucharistic Celebration presided by Archbishop Charles John Brown, Apostolic Nuncio to the Philippines.

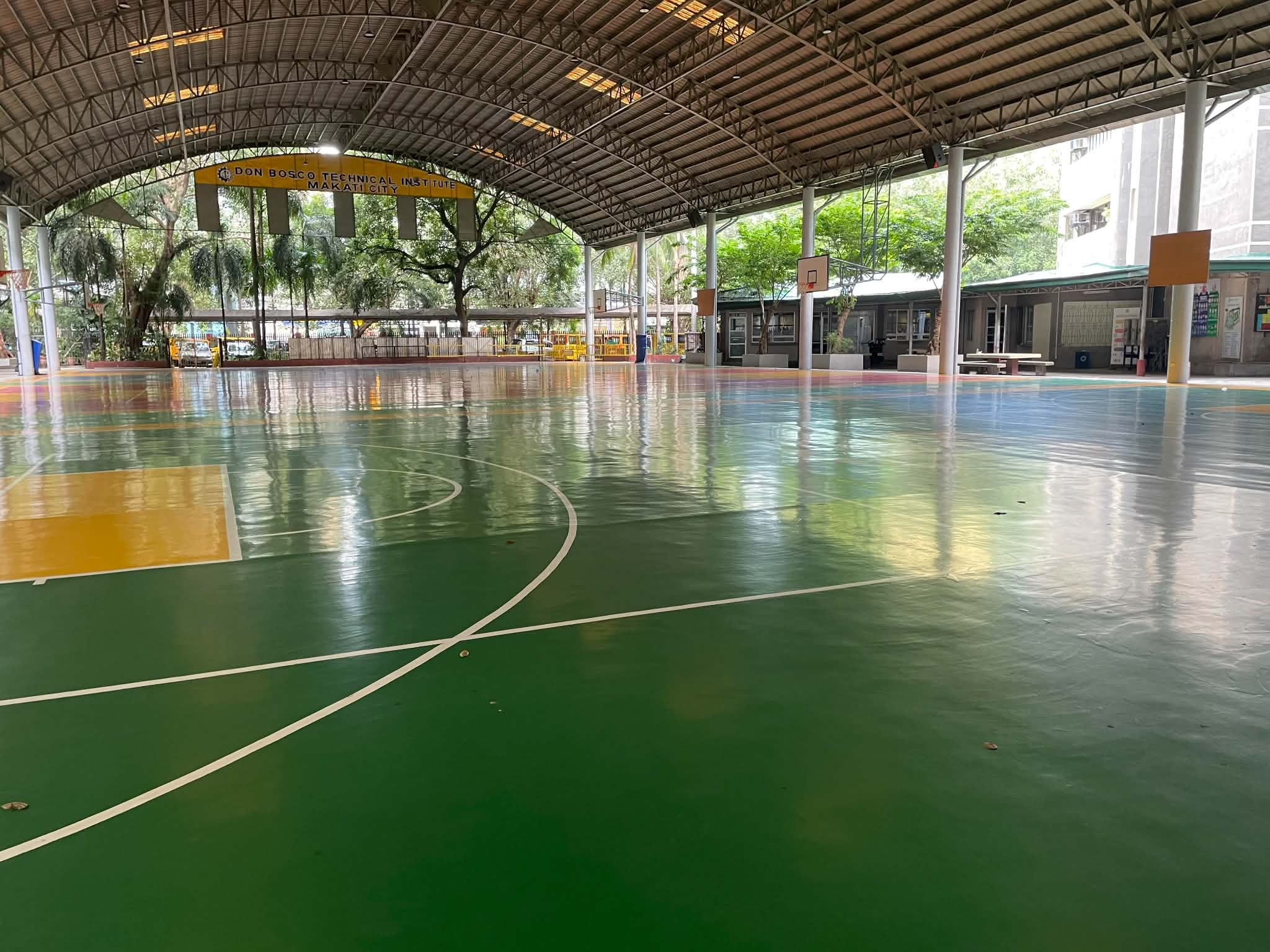
Magone Dome in 2024

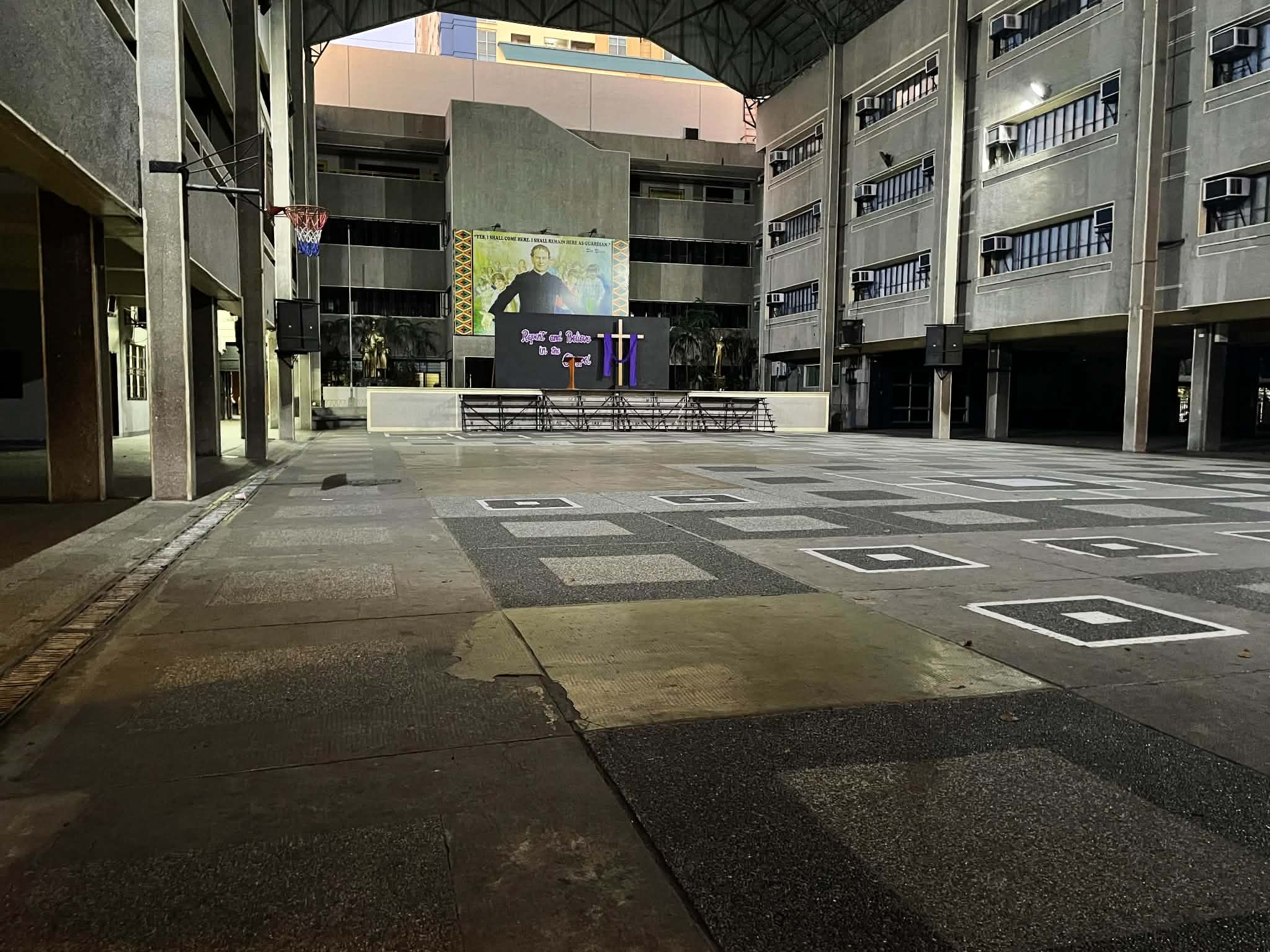
Savio Dome in 2025

== Programs ==
=== Elementary Department ===
The Elementary Department is a primary and intermediate school that provides a holistic curriculum based on the K–12 curriculum, modified to align with the Salesian Educational System. The curriculum integrates cognitive, spiritual, physical, technical, and social formation aimed at preparing students for secondary education.

The department advocates information literacy as its approach to the basic curriculum required by the Department of Education. The Elementary Department emerged to have the best educational management information system in the Division of Pasay Schools. Computer aided design was integrated in drafting the technical curriculum through the assistance of the Advance Technology Solutions Technologies of Singapore. Equipment and facilities for the Electronic Data Processing were installed for the networking of all records in the Accounting, Registrar, Testing and Personnel Offices.

Levels of Studies

- Grades 1–6
- Kindergarten

Principal: Mr. Ace H. Dulce

Assistant Principals

- Mrs. Modest Rubilyn R. Cordero - Assistant Principal for Student Affairs
- Ms. Marilou M. Sibayan - Assistant Principal for Academic Affairs
- Fr. Benhur Borja, SDB - Assistant Principal for Pastoral Affairs

=== High School Department ===
==== Junior High School ====
The Junior High School unit is a lower secondary school aimed at providing learners with academic and technical advancement through research and innovation in preparation for Senior High School. It also features up-to-date facilities in the fields of academic, technical, spiritual, and athletics.

Curriculum

The curriculum is as prescribed by the Department of Education — Mathematics, Science, English, Filipino, Araling Panlipunan, Research, and MAPEH (Music, Arts, Physical Education, Health) in addition to Christian Living.

Apart from the academic curriculum, the Junior High School unit offers technical programs under the Technology and Livelihood Education Area (TLE). The technical curriculum for Grade 7 and 8 students follows the General Technology orientation.

- Automotive-Mechanical Technology
- Electrical-Electronics Technology
- Computer Technology
- Industrial Technology

By the end of 8th Grade, students are evaluated for their chosen specialization. These specializations include:

- Automotive Design Technology
- Mechanical Design Technology
- Electrical Systems Design Technology
- Electronics Design Technology
- Creative Design Technology
- Information & Communications Technology
- Graphics Design and Animation

Alongside these specializations, all Grade 9 and 10 Bosconians take classes in CAD (computer-aided design) using Autodesk AutoCAD.

==== Senior High School ====
The Senior High School unit is an upper secondary school housed at the Father Carlo Braga Building. The Senior High School unit is driven by a research-oriented and innovative program aimed to equip learners with academic and technical competencies, making them globally competitive and college-ready.

Curriculum

The core and academic elective subjects mandated by the Department of Education, along with Christian Living subjects, are offered to both Grade 11 and 12 students under the following elective clusters:

- Arts, Social Sciences, and Humanities
- Business and Entrepreneurship
- Science, Technology, Engineering, and Mathematics

In addition to the academic track, the Technical-Professional (TechPro) track is offered with the following courses:

- Animation
- Computer Programming
- Computer Systems Servicing
- Illustration

Principal: Mr. Alfredo A. Lozanta, Jr.

Assistant Principals

- Mr. Marlowe B. Ingles - Assistant Principal for Curriculum and Innovation
- Mr. Edcris Paulo A. Tiglao - Assistant Principal for Student Affairs
- Fr. Elmer P. Sicat, SDB - Assistant Principal for Pastoral Affairs

Others

- Ms. Reyasel B. Hernandez - Student Activity Coordinator (JHS)
- Mr. Jaymart Rosales - Student Activity Coordinator (SHS)

=== Technical Vocational Education and Training Center ===
Formerly known as the Don Bosco Training Center, Manpower Training Department (MTD), and Manpower Skills Training Center (MSTC), the TVET Department was established in 1971 with the goal of providing underprivileged youth with technical skills to gain employment, and improve their self and familial livelihood.

The TVET Department offers the following courses:

- Fitter-Machinist
- Automobile Mechanic
- Electro-Mechanical Technician
- Refrigeration and Air-Conditioning Mechanic

== Clubs ==
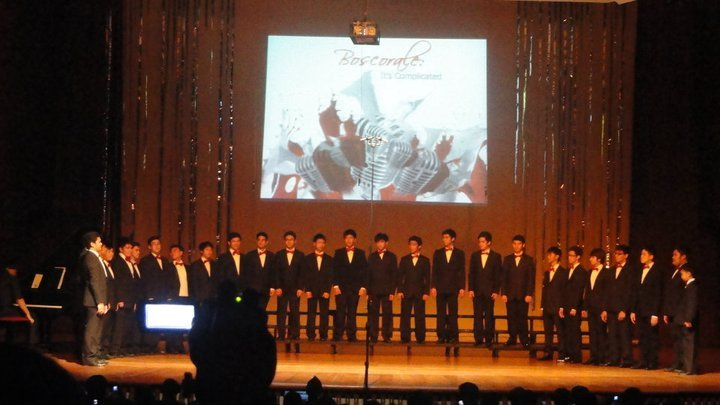
Boscorale, Don Bosco Technical Institute-Makati's choir group

• Boscorale, the school's representative choral group, is one of the known all-male High School choirs in the Philippines. The Boscorale was said to be the school's pride when it comes to chorale singing due to its various achievements from winning in various prestige chorale competitions in the metro. To date, the young male choir have already achieved 16 notable prizes: 6 championships, 9 runners-up and a minor award. The Boscorale is currently holding the "back-to-back" championship titles in the Annual Ayala Interschool Christmas Caroling Competition and the Musica FEUropa - High School Category Competition.

== Rectors ==
Rectors of Don Bosco Makati
#	Name	Term
1	Fr. Pierangelo Quaranta, SDB	1954 - 1955
2	Fr. Vincent Ricaldone, SDB	1955 - 1956
3	Fr. Charles Braga, SDB	1956 - 1960
4	Fr. Emilio Baggio, SDB	1960 - 1961
5	Fr. Igino Ricaldone, SDB	1961 - 1963
6	Fr. Godfrey Roozen, SDB	1963 - 1967
7	Fr. Felix Glowicki, SDB	1967 - 1970
8	Fr. Anthony Pezzota, SDB	1970 - 1971
9	Fr. Valeriano Barbero, SDB	1971 - 1972
10	Fr. Joseph Savina, SDB	1972 - 1978
11	Fr. Remo Bati, SDB	1978 - 1982
12	Fr. Marciano Evangelista, SDB	1982 - 1988
13	Fr. Danilo Torres, SDB	1988 - 1994
14	Fr. Vicente Cervania, SDB	1994 - 1997
15	Fr. Caesar N. Dizon, SDB	1997 - 2002
16	Fr. Luisito A. Castañeda, SDB	2002 - 2008
17	Fr. Anthony Paul E. Bicomong, SDB	2008 - 2014
18	Fr. Alexander L. Garces, SDB	2014 - 2017
19	Fr. Jose Favie V. Faldas, SDB	2017 - 2023
20	Fr. Jerry T. Santos, SDB	2023 - 2026
21	Fr. Abner M. Santos, SDB	2026 - present

== Notable alumni ==
- Ali Atienza, politician
- Jun Aristorenas, actor, director, dancer, producer, writer
- Kim Atienza, TV host and politician
- LA Tenorio, athlete, Philippine Basketball Association
- Niño Muhlach, actor
- Ronnie Ricketts, actor
- Mark Meily, film director
- Herminio Coloma Jr., former Secretary of the Presidential Communications Operations Office
- Raymond Bagatsing, actor
- Perfecto De Castro, guitarist, original member of Rivermaya
- Pedro Centeno Baquero, Bishop of the Roman Catholic Diocese of Kerema, Papua New Guinea
- Chito Gascon (+), 7th Chairman of the Commission on Human Rights of the Philippines
- Dominic Zapata, Film Director
- Rudy del Rosario (+), former football coach and Philippines National Football Team player, co-founder of Kaya F.C.–Iloilo
- Connor Anthony Canlas Sr., 38th Commanding General of the Philippine Air Force
- Fredderick Vida, Secretary of Justice, Department of Justice
- Mike Logico, Philippine Army Lieutenant General and Superintendent of the Philippine Military Academy
- Medwin Marfil, Lead vocalist and co-founder of True Faith (band)
