= 66th Infantry Battalion (Philippines) =

66th Infantry (Kabalikat) Battalion
- Country: Philippines
- Allegiance: Republic of the Philippines
- Branch: Philippine Army
- Type: Infantry Battalion
- Part of: 701st Infantry Brigade, 7th Infantry Division, Philippine Army
- Garrison/HQ: Barangay Cabinuangan, New Bataan, Davao de Oro
- Motto: "Evil will triumph when good people do nothing."

Commanders
- Notable commanders: LTCOL Michael G Logico PA
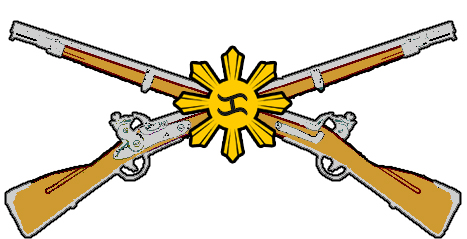
- Philippine Army Infantry Branch Insignia

The 66th Infantry (Kabalikat) Battalion of the Philippine Army is an infantry battalion headquartered at Barangay Cabinuangan, New Bataan, Davao de Oro, and operationally controlled by the 701st Kagitingan Brigade of the 7th Infantry Division.

== History ==
=== Activation ===
The present 66th Infantry Battalion (66IB) of the Philippine Army was initially activated as part of the 3rd Infantry Division (3ID) under an order issued on April 6, 1998, when the Armed Forces of the Philippines took back its role as the primary government agency in charge of internal security. As part of the resulting reorganization, personnel were reassigned to the 66 IB from various battalions under the 3ID, notably A Company of the 61st Infantry Battalion, which had just returned from a tour of duty in the Lanao provinces in what was then the Autonomous Region in Muslim Mindanao.

Lieutenant General Raul Urgello of the Philippine Military Academy's class of 1966 played a key role in the unit's creation after a prior unit, the 66th Infantry "Banat" Battalion of the 3ID, was inactivated in 1991 when the primary responsibility for internal security was assigned the Philippine National Police.

=== Under the 6th Infantry Division ===
By 2005, the battalion was based in Northern Mindanao and had been reassigned to the 601st Infantry Brigade of the 6th Infantry Division.

=== Under the 10th Infantry Division ===
In 2006 the entirety of the 6th Infantry Division's 601st Infantry Brigade, including the 66th IB, was reassigned to the newly created 10th Infantry Division.

==== 2014 Taytayan incident ====
The lead platoon of the 66IB were on patrol in Sitio Taytayan of Barangay Andap in New Bataan at around 4 A.M. on October 12, 2014 when they ran into Rolando Dagansan and his 16-year-old son Felix, farmers from the Mandaya people who were on their way to their farm. The Dagansans were surprised by the presence of the soldiers and turned on their flashlights.

According to the official statement of 66IB Commanding Officer Lt. Col. Michael Logico, the platoon's point man was surprised by the sound of voices saying "Sundalo, sundalo!" (Soldiers, soldiers!) and by the sudden gleam of flashlights just five meters away from him. Allegedly responding in surprise, he fired in the direction of the voices and lights, killing both father and son. Logico was informed of the shooting by cellphone, and immediately reported the incident to the local police, and sought a dialogue with the elders of the Mandaue people, to which the Dagansans belonged. The Compostela Valley police had initially "misencounter", but this was later corrected when Logico issued his statement. The Armed Forces of the Philippines disarmed and confined-to-barracks about two dozen members of the 66IB while the investigation was ongoing.

At the Mandaya tribal council held four days later on October 16, 2014, the aggrieved Mandaya insisted that the death penalty should apply in the case of the killings, as required by the customary laws of the Mandaya people, as per the Indigenous Peoples' Rights Act of 1997. Logico informed the council that he could not allow this to happen, since the men were under his command, and offered to take their place instead. The Mandaya declined the offer, and instead accepted Logico's other offer to pay "balukas" (indemnity) in the form of financial and material aid to the families of the victims. Mandaya Elder Arturo Dagansan, a relative of the victims, spoke at the closing of the council as the family's spokesman, but broke down in tears as he was speaking. Logico, likewise overwhelmed by emotion, kneeled in front of Dagansan in apology, prompting to elder to embrace him and reply saying ""Salamat, Colonel, sa imong pagkilala sa among kasakit" (Thank you, Colonel, for your recognition of our anguish.) The council closed with the signing of an agreement "to settle all debts between the Batallion and the Mandaya tribe." The incident was reported by Mindanao news outfits Edge Davao and Mindanews.

The Armed Forces of the Philippines' Eastern Mindanao Command later ordered the 10th Infantry Division to conduct a review of the incident, to determine the legal repercussions for the soldiers involved.

=== Under the 7th Infantry Division ===
As of 2017, the 66IB was assigned to the 701st Infantry Brigade, under the 7th Infantry Division.
