= Mike Logico =

Philippine Army general

Michael G. Logico
- Education: Philippine Military Academy (BS); Ateneo de Manila University (MPM); National Defense College of the Philippines (MNSA)
- Military career
- Allegiance: Philippines
- Branch: Philippine Army
- Service years: 1993–present
- Rank: Lieutenant General
- Commands: Philippine Military Academy; Education and Training Command, Philippine Army; AFP Joint Warfighting Center; 66th Infantry Battalion
- Awards: Distinguished Service Star; Gold Cross Medal; Meritorious Achievement Medal (with Anahaw device); AFP Chief of Staff Commendation Medal and Ribbon; Silver Wing Medal; Military Merit Medal with Spearhead and Anahaw devices; Military Civic Action Medal; Parangal sa Kapanalig ng Sandatahang Lakas ng Pilipinas; Military Commendation Medals; Anti-Dissidence Campaign Medal; Luzon, Visayas, and Mindanao Anti-Dissidence Campaign Medals; Disaster Relief and Rehabilitation Operation Ribbon; Northern Maritime Frontier Campaign Medal; Long Service Medal; Presidential Unit Citation; People Power II Unit Citation; Combat Commander's (Kagitingan) Badge (CC(K)B); AFP Parachutist Badge; Special Forces Qualification Badge

Michael G. Logico is a Filipino military officer, educator, and fitness advocate who serves as the Superintendent of the Philippine Military Academy in Baguio City. He is best known in military circles for his as a proponent of strategic doctrine development, multi-domain warfare, and joint capability training. In the broader Philippine public, Logico is known for his advocacy of a robust stance in asserting the Philippines' internationally recognized territorial sovereignty in the West Philippine Sea, and for advocating human rights, due process, finance and security sector governance, and civil military relations, which have sometimes gone viral in Philippine social media.

== Early life and education ==
He is the son of Epineto Logico, a former Air Force Major General and Commander of the AFP Western Command, and Maria Logico, a faculty member of St. Scholastica's College, Manila. He finished his basic education at the Don Bosco Technical Institute of Makati, and his Bachelor of Science from the Philippine Military Academy in 1993. He later graduated with a Master in Public Management degree from the Ateneo de Manila University, a Master in Development and Security degree from the Development Academy of the Philippines, and a Master in National Security Administration degree from the National Defense College of the Philippines.

== Early field assignments ==
Upon graduation from PMA, he joined the Philippine Army and served as a member of the 1st Special Forces Regiment (Airborne).

=== De-escalating the Taytayan incident ===
He was widely praised in Philippine media for his role in de-escalating the so-called "Taytayan incident" during his time as commanding officer of the Philippine Army's 66th Infantry Battalion (66IB), where he as commanding officer chose to take personal responsibility for the accidental killing of two indigenous farmers by 66IB soldiers during a routine patrol. Logico famously knelt and asked for forgiveness before the elders of the Mandaya tribal council, offering to take on the soldiers' lifedebt. Instead, the council accepted his apology and, upon provision of the traditional "balukas" (indemnity), agreed "to settle all debts between the Battalion and the Mandaya tribe."

== Doctrine development, wargaming, training and joint operations ==
In military circles, he gained prominence during his various stints as director of the AFP Joint and Combined Training Center, the AFP Doctrine Development Center and the Command and General Staff College Wargaming Center. He also taught at the National Defense College of the Philippines (NDCP) and at the AFP Command and General Staff College, placing a strong emphasis on the development of strategic doctrine and on building capacity for joint operations. He has been appointed executive agent in several years of joint military exercises between the Philippines and several of its key allies.

== Senior command roles ==
=== Training and Doctrine Command ===
In October 2025, he was appointed as Commander of the Education and Training Command, Philippine Army, after serving as its Deputy Commander in 2024. and was formally promoted to the rank of Major General a few days after.

=== Philippine Military Academy ===
On July 22, 2026, he assumed office as the Superintendent of the Philippine Military Academy, succeeding Vice Admiral Caesar Bernard Valencia, being promoted to Lieutenant General in the process.

During his change of command speech, he indicated that he intended to "infuse game theory, decision focused learning including wargaming and simulations that challenge the cadets to analyze situations, solve problems, and make timely decisions", noting that judgement initiative teamwork and intellectual agility which are essential qualities in modern warfare and... will develop habits that will make them better commanders and leaders."

== Public advocacy ==
=== West Philippine Sea issues ===
Logico has been a persistent advocate of a robust stance in asserting the Philippines' internationally recognized territorial sovereignty in the West Philippine Sea.

=== Human rights and security sector reform ===
He is also well known to media for using various platforms to advocate for human rights, due process, finance and security sector governance, and civil military relations. Many of his social media posts have gone viral for clarifying issues during moments of national controversy or confusion.

=== Barefoot Running ===
Before being promoted to General in 2025, Logico was popularly nicknamed the "Barefoot Colonel" due to his role in promoting barefoot running in the Philippines.

== See also ==
- Security sector governance and reform in the Philippines
- Philippine Military Academy
- Armed Forces of the Philippines Command and General Staff College
- National Defense College of the Philippines
- West Philippine Sea
- 66th Infantry Battalion (Philippines)
