= Ronnie Evangelista =

Filipino politician and retired general officer

Mayor of Rodriguez, Rizal
- Incumbent
- Assumed office June 30, 2022
- Preceded by: Dennis Hernandez

Personal details
- Born: Ronnie Sexon Evangelista; May 23, 1964 (age 62) Montalban, Rizal, Philippines
- Party: NPC (2024–present)
- Other political affiliations: PDP (2022–2024)
- Spouse: Jeanny Evangelista
- Education: Philippine Military Academy (BS)
- Occupation: Military officer (retired), politician

Military service
- Allegiance: Philippines
- Branch/service: Philippine Army
- Years of service: 1986–2019
- Rank: Lieutenant General
- Commands: Civil Relation Service; Special Command (SOCOM), Philippine Army; Office of the Philippine Military Academy Superintendent

Ronnie Sexon Evangelista (born May 23, 1964) is a Filipino former military officer and politician who served as Mayor of Rodriguez, Rizal.

== Military career ==
An alumnus of PMA class of 1986, Evangelista served with the Philippine Army. He served as commander Civil Relation Service and Commander Special Operations Command (SoCom). He authored Special Forces Manual which is being used by the Armed Forces of the Philippines (AFP). He also invented three marksmanship training systems namely: Simultaneous Moving Automated Random Target System (SMART), Field Marksmanship Training System (FMTS), and the Pneumatic Marksmanship Training System (PMTS).

He later served as Superintendent Philippine Military Academy, but due to the death of Darwin Dormitorio, he resigned in 2019.

== Political career ==
Evangelista ran for Mayor for Montalban, Rizal, in 2022 and won under the outgoing ruling party PDP-Laban. He is seeking re-election in 2025, this time as a member of the Nationalist People's Coalition.
