= PMA Sinagtala Class of 1986 =

Philippine Military Academy class

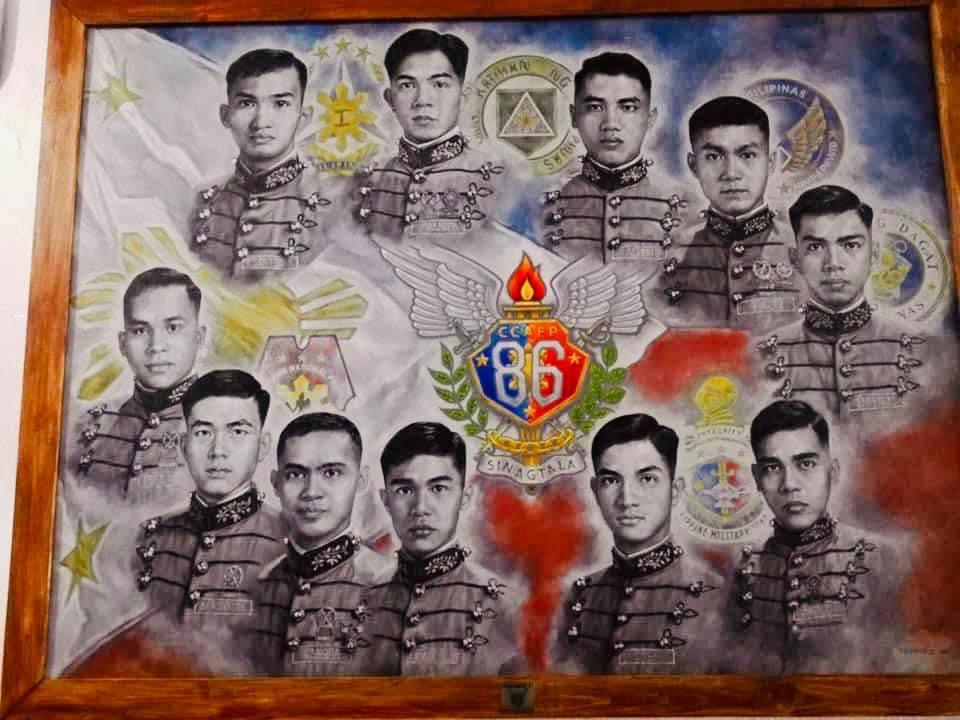
Portrait of the Sinagtala Class of 1986 alumni, with future police chief and senator Ronald dela Rosa seen at far left.

The Sinagtala Class of 1986 (English: light from above, lit. Starlight) was the first to graduate from the Philippine Military Academy (PMA) after the 1986 People Power revolution, and the first batch of new military officers to serve the administration of the late President Corazon Aquino.

== About the class ==
In 1982, 357 cadets entered the Philippine Military Academy in Baguio; only 128 (Note: Including cadets from other classes, a total of 174 graduated in 1986.) managed to graduate in 1986. The class valedictorian (ranking first in the class) was Gilbert Gapay, the class baron (immediate assistant of the commandant) and ranking second was Rozzano Briguez, and the class goat (lowest ranking in the class) was Arthur Biyo.

During their time in the academy, the country was undergoing massive political change. For most of their training, the commander-in-chief was the authoritarian President Ferdinand Marcos. However, in February 1986, the People Power Revolution overthrew Marcos and installed Corazon Aquino as the new President and commander-in-chief. The Sinagtala class became the first PMA class to graduate after the restoration of democracy in the Philippines.

As of February 2016, 21 alumni of the class have died while 41 have become generals: 26 in the Armed Forces of the Philippines and 15 in the Philippine National Police.

== Notable members ==
Rank	Name	Career	Ref.
General	Gilbert Gapay	Chairman of the Joint Chiefs (August 3, 2020–February 4, 2021); Chief of the Army (2019 – August 3, 2020); Class valedictorian	
Lieutenant General	Rozzano Briguez	Commanding General of the Philippine Air Force (2018–2020); Class Baron and salutatorian	
Vice Admiral	Allan Ferdinand V. Cusi	Superintendent of the Philippine Military Academy (2019–2020)	
Police Director General	Ronald "Bato" dela Rosa	Senator of the Philippines (2019–present); Director-General of the Bureau of Corrections (2018); Chief of the Philippine National Police (2016–2018)	
Police General	Oscar Albayalde	Chief of the Philippine National Police (2018–2019)	
Police General	Archie Gamboa	Chief of the Philippine National Police (2019–2020)	
Police General	Camilo Cascolan	Chief of the Philippine National Police (2020); Undersecretary of the Department of Health	
General	Felimon Santos Jr.	Chairman of the Joint Chiefs (2020)	
Lieutenant General	Ronnie Evangelista	Municipal Mayor, Rodriguez, Rizal (June 30, 2022–present); Commander Civil Relation Service; Commander Special Operations Command (SoCom); Superintendent Philippine Military Academy (2018–2019)	
Lieutenant General	Macairog Alberto	Philippine Ambassador to the Israel (2020–present); Commanding General of the Philippine Army (2018–2019)	
Vice Admiral	Robert Empedrad	Administrator of the Maritime Industry Authority (March 2, 2020–present); Flag Officer-in-Command of the Philippine Navy (2017–2020)	

- Vice Admiral Gaudencio C. Collado Jr. (Vice Chairman of the Joint Chiefs)
- Vice Admiral Rene V. Medina (former commander of the AFP Western Command)
- Lieutenant General Antonio Ramon A. Lim (Chief of the Joint Staff)
- Major General Alvin A. Parreño (former Commandant of the Philippine Marine Corps)
- Major General Reynaldo M. Aquino (Vice Commander of the Philippine Army)
- Police Major General Roel Obusan (PNP Chief of Criminal Investigation and Detection Group office)
- Police Lieutenant General Fernando Mendez (former PNP Deputy Chief for Administration)
- Major General Gems Molina Jr. (Deputy Chief of Staff of the AFP's Plans and Programs)
- Police Major General Jose Ma. Victor Ramos (PNP Chief of Logistics Office)
- Police Major General Ramon Purugganan (PNP Chief of Comptrollership Office)
- Police Major General Edwin Roque (PNP Chief of Plans Office)
- Police Major General Lyndon Cubos (PNP Chief of Personnel and Records Management Office)
- Police Major General Elmo Sarona (PNP Chief of Investigation and Detective Management Office)
- Police Major General Amador Corpus (PNP Chief of CIDG Office)
- Police Major General Noel Baraceros (PNP Chief of Center for Police Strategy Management Office)
- Police Major General Edward Carranza (PNP Chief for Logistics)
- Police Major General Ely Rasco (PNP Regional Director, Region 12)
- Police Major General Timoteo Pacleb (PNP Chief for Research and Development)
- Police Major General Joemar Espino (PNP Regional Director, Region 2)
- Police Major General Rey Biay (PNP Chief of Civil Security Group Office)
- Police Major General Egay Gonzales (PNP Chief of Intelligence Group Office)
- Police Major General Rex Acabado (PNP Chief of SOSIA Office)
- Police Major General Elpidio Gabriel (PNP Director, Training Service)
- Police Major General Noli Romana
- Police Major General Mariel Magaway
- Police Major General Marlon Ganzon
- Police Major General Ato Angara
- Police Major General Eleuterio Gutierrez
- Police Major General Eddie Benigay (AFPSLAI Trustee)
- Police Major General Ding Acio
- Police Major General Omar Buenafe (Bureau of Corrections Deputy Director)
- Police Major General Valfrie Tabian
- Police Major General Charlo Collado
- Police Major General Doy Trampe
- Police Major General Antonio Gardiola (LTFRB Board Member, LTFRB Regional Director)
- Police Brigadier General Joel Crisostomo De Leon Garcia
- Police Brigadier General Joselio Imperial
- Police Brigadier General Heriberto Olitoquit (AFPSLAI Trustee)
- Police Brigadier General Rafael P. Santiago
- Police Colonel Victorino Mina (PSSLAI Trustee)
- Police Colonel Cezar O. Mancao Jr.
- US Army Colonel Ellery Tiongson
- Second Lieutenant Dan Peña +
- Brigadier General Dionisio C. Baudin, Former Commander of 52nd Engineer Brigade (2018 - 2019)
- Brigadier General Arthur Biyo (Class Goat)
- Brigadier General Archimedes Viaje, former Inspector General of the PMA, former Dean of the Corps of Professors of the Armed Forces of the Philippines, and current President of the National Defense College of the Philippines (NDCP)
- Brigadier General Raylindo Aniñon (Current Regional Director II-OCD Region 12)
- Brigadier General Claudio L Yucot (Current Regional Director II-OCD Bicol)
- Brigadier General Joselito R. Serrano (Commandant of Combat Service Support School, TRADOC, PA)

== See also ==
- The class the stars fell on – United States Military Academy Class of 1915
