= Ferdinand Cartujano =

Filipino Air Force General

Ferdinand Cartujano LLH
- Born: Ferdinand Mendez Cartujano; June 26, 1966 (age 60); San Miguel, Bulacan Philippines
- Education: University of the Philippines Diliman (dropped out); Philippine Military Academy (BS); University of Asia and the Pacific (MBE); University of Canberra (MDS)
- Spouse: Dinna Anna Lee Lumibao-Cartujano
- Children: 2 daughters
- Military career
- Branch: Philippine Air Force
- Service years: 1988 - 2022
- Rank: Lieutenant general
- Service number: O-9857
- Commands: Superintendent of the Philippine Military Academy; Air Force Education, Training and Doctrine Command; Chief of Academy Staff, Philippine Military Academy; 505th Search and Rescue Group; 5051st Search and Rescue Squadron
- Conflicts: Moro conflict CPP-NPA-NDF conflict

Lieutenant General Ferdinand Mendez Cartujano is a retired Filipino Air Force General who served as the 82nd Superintendent of the Philippine Military Academy since 16 November 2020. Prior to his position, he served as the commander of the Air Force Education, Training and Doctrine Command, the Chief of Academy Staff, Philippine Military Academy, the 505th Search and Rescue Group, and the 5051st Search and Rescue Squadron. Cartujano retired from military service on 26 June 2022 after 34 years in military service.

Cartujano currently serves as the President of the National Defense College of the Philippines (NDCP) since 15 August 2022.

== Early life and education ==
Cartujano was born at San Miguel, Bulacan on 26 June 1966, and grew up at Roxas City in Capiz. Cartujano enrolled in the public school system throughout his youth where he finished elementary school as salutatorian, and graduated from high school as class valedictorian. Cartujano stayed at the University of the Philippines Diliman for two years studying bachelor of science (BS) Marine Science. Cartujano entered the Philippine Military Academy (PMA) in 1984, and graduated as a member of the PMA Maringal Class of 1988. During his days as a cadet at the PMA, Cartujano was named in the Dean’s List and the Commandant’s List, and was named as a champion in various sports, such as boxing, karate, aikido, volleyball and basketball, where he was named Most Valuable Player (MVP) twice.

After graduating from the PMA, Cartujano also entered various courses locally and abroad, such as the PAF Flying School at Basilio Fernando Air Base in 1990, where he finished his course with "flying colors"; the Squadron Officers Course, where he graduated Number 2 in his class; the AFP Logistics Officers Integrated Course, graduating Number 1 in his class; the Air Intelligence Officers’ Course, where he also graduated at the top of his class; the AFP Financial Management Course, finishing at Number 3 of his class; the Australian Command General Staff Course at the Australian Defence College in Canberra, Australia, the Senior Executive Course in National Security Class 10 at the National Defense College of the Philippines (NDCP); the Defense Resource Management Seminar and the Regional Seminar-Workshop on Transparency and Conventional Arms in the United Nation Economic and Social Commission for Asia and the Pacific (ESCAP) Headquarters in Bangkok, Thailand.

Cartujano also holds a master's degree in Defense Studies (MDS) at the University of Canberra and a master's degree in Business Economics (MBE) at the University of Asia and the Pacific in Mandaluyong City.

== Military career ==
Cartujano started his career at the Philippine Air Force (PAF) when he was assigned the 207th Tactical Helicopter "Stingers" Squadron, under the 205th Tactical Helicopter Wing, where he served as an assault helicopter pilot, piloting the Air Force's Bell UH-1H Huey helicopters, and assisted assault and tactical operations within key areas that are known as insurgency hotspots, such as in Marag Valley in Apayao, in Camarines Sur; in Central Visayas, particularly at the Negros Island; and on the areas of Southern Mindanao. Cartujano also served at staff positions and led various units in the PAF, such as being the Squadron Commander of the 5051st Search and Rescue Squadron, where his unit was awarded as the Best Squadron Commander of the Year for three consecutive years from 2001 to 2003, due to his successful rescue operations throughout the typhoon seasons.

Cartujano has accumulated a total of more than 5,000 flying hours, primarily on helicopters like the Bell UH-1H Hueys, and the Bell 205A search and rescue helicopters. During an ambush encounter against the New People's Army in Samar in 1993, Cartujano was awarded the Wounded Personnel Medal for surviving the ambush and sustaining wounds. Cartujano also served at administrative positions in the PAF and in the PMA, such as in the Office of the Deputy Chief of Staff for Plans (OJ-5), the Office of the Assistant Chief of Air Staff for Operations, Organization & Training (OA-3), the Air Force Management and Fiscal Office, the Office of the Air Force Adjutant General, and as the Chief of Division Staff of 1st Air Division. He also became the Group Commander of the 505th Search and Rescue Group and served as the Deputy Wing Commander of 600th Air Base Wing. In 2016, Cartjuano became the Chief of Academy Staff of the PMA, before being named as the Assistant Superintendent of the PMA in 2017. Cartujano became the Deputy Commander of the Air Force Education, Training and Doctrine Command (AETDC) on 2018, before being named as its Commander on 17 September 2019, where he was also promoted to Major General. During his stint as the commander of the AETDC, his unit was named as the PAF Functional Command of the Year for two consecutive years (2019 & 2020).

On 16 November 2020, he took command as the 82nd Superintendent of the Philippine Military Academy, replacing Vice Admiral Allan Ferdinand V. Cusi, who reached the mandatory retirement age of 56. As PMA Superintendent, he vowed to continue creating reforms from his predecessor to completely remove hazing and maltreatment within the academy. He was also promoted to Lieutenant General in January 2021 and was confirmed for promotion on his post by the Commission on Appointments on 24 March 2021. During his term as Superintendent of the PMA, Cartujano also oversaw a total of 1,270 cadets for school year 2021- 2022 and regularized all contractual employees.

Cartujano's term as Superintendent of the Philippine Military Academy ended on 26 June 2022, during his 56th birthday. and was eventually replaced by Major General Rowen S. Tolentino.

== Civilian Life ==
On 15 August 2022, Cartujano was named by then-Acting Defense Secretary Jose Faustino Jr. as the 24th and incumbent President of the National Defense College of the Philippines (NDCP). During his assumption speech, Cartujano noted his three thrusts in his term: institutionalization, expansion, and self-development, which is aimed in enhancing the NDCP's goals.

== Awards and decorations in military service ==
Left Side:

Badges	Philippine Air Force Gold Wings Badge		
1st row		Commander, Philippine Legion of Honor	
2nd row	Officer, Philippine Legion of Honor	Member, Order of Sikatuna	1 Outstanding Achievement Medal
3rd row	3 Distinguished Service Stars with three bronze anahaw clusters	1 Gold Cross Medal	Distinguished Aviation Cross medals with three bronze anahaw clusters
4th row	Silver Cross Medals	1 Meritorious Achievement Medal with one bronze anahaw cluster	Distinguished Service Medal
5th row	Chief of Staff of the AFP Commendation Medal	Gawad sa Kaunlaran	Bronze Cross Medals Silver Wing Medal
6th row	Silver Wing Medal	Wounded Personnel Medal	Military Merit Medals with three bronze spearhead devices
7th row	Military Merit Medals with four silver anahaw clusters	Military Merit Medals with three bronze anahaw clusters	Unknown Medal
8th row	Unknown Medal	Sagisag ng Ulirang Kawal	Military Civic Action Medals with four bronze anahaw clusters
9th row	Parangal sa Kapanalig ng Sandatahang Lakas ng Pilipinas Medals with three bronze anahaw clusters	Military Commendation Medals with four triangular clasps	Presidential Security Service Ribbon
10th row	Long Service Medal with one service star	Anti-Dissidence Campaign Medal with four campaign stars	Luzon Anti-Dissidence Campaign Medal with four campaign stars
11th row	Visayas Anti-Dissidence Campaign Medal with four campaign stars	Mindanao Anti-Dissidence Campaign Medal with four campaign stars	Kalayaan Island Group Campaign Medal
12th row	Unknown Ribbon	Unknown Ribbon	Disaster Relief and Rehabilitation Operations Ribbon with four campaign star

Right Side:

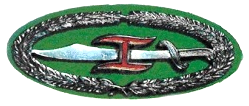

Badges	Combat Commander's Badge		
1st row		Philippine Republic Presidential Unit Citation	
2nd row	Presidential Streamer Award	People Power I Unit Citation	People Power II Unit Citation

Badges and Other Awards:

- Australian Command and Staff College Badge
- AFP Logistics Eligibility Badge
- Philippine Air Force Flight Plan 2028 Badge

== Personal life ==
He is married to Dinna Anna Lee Lumibao-Cartujano, who serves as the Director IV, Office of Human Resource at the Department of National Defense, and they have 2 daughters.
