= Allan Ferdinand V. Cusi =

Filipino Admiral (born 1964

- Born: November 17, 1964 (age 61); Quezon City, Metro Manila, Philippines
- Education: Philippine Military Academy
- Children: 3
- Military career
- Branch: Philippine Navy
- Service years: 1986 - 2020
- Rank: Vice Admiral
- Service number: O-9524
- Commands: Superintendent of the Philippine Military Academy; Naval Education, Training and Doctrines Command; Vice Commander, Philippine Navy; Chief of Naval Staff, Philippine Navy; Joint Task Force Malampaya; Naval Task Force 50; BRP Rizal (PS-74)
- Conflicts: Moro conflict CPP-NPA-NDF conflict

Allan Ferdinand Valdez Cusi (born November 17, 1964) is a Filipino Admiral who served as the former Superintendent of the Philippine Military Academy after Lt. Gen. Ronnie Evangelista resigned over the hazing case and the Death of Darwin Dormitorio He is a graduate of the PMA "Sinagtala" Class of 1986.

== Background ==
He was born on November 17, 1964, at Quezon City, as the son of the former PMA 1962 graduate Aquilino Cusi. He entered the PMA in 1982 and graduated in 1986 as a member of the PMA Sinagtala Class of 1986.

He attended various programs in the country and abroad, such as courses at the Armed Forces of the Philippines Command and General Staff College (honor graduate award), the Naval Staff College Course (graduated with distinction), at the Naval War College, in Newport, Rhode Island, and a graduate of Master of Science in National Resource Strategy at the Industrial College of the Armed Forces, National Defense University in Washington, D.C., USA.

He commanded various ships and been in various commands and positions in the Philippine Navy and in the General Headquarters, Armed Forces of the Philippines. He served as the Commanding Officer of BRP Rizal (PS-74) of the Philippine Fleet and 13 other Philippine Navy vessels of various types and displacements; Charlie Company Tactical Officer at the Philippine Military Academy; Assistant Chief of Fleet Staff for Operations, F3 in the Philippine Fleet; Director of the Naval Operations Center, Headquarters, Philippine Navy.

He was also the Director, Command Leadership and Management Division, Academic Center, at the AFP Command and General Staff College; became Chief of Academy Staff at the Philippine Military Academy, Commander of the Joint Task Force Malampaya, Commander of Naval Task Force 50, Deputy Commander of the AFP Western Command, Chief of Naval Staff of the Philippine Navy, Vice Commander of Philippine Navy and Commander of the Naval Education, Training and Doctrines Command.

He became the 81st Superintendent of the Philippine Military Academy (PMA) on October 1, 2019, after the resignation of Lieutenant General Ronnie S. Evangelista amidst the Hazing of Cadet 4th Class Darwin Dormitorio. He retired from military service on November 16, 2020, and was replaced by Lieutenant General Ferdinand M. Cartujano.

== Awards and decorations ==
- Philippine Republic Presidential Unit Citation
- People Power I Unit Citation
- People Power II Unit Citation
- Award of the Philippine Legion of Honor (Degree of Officer)
- Distinguished Service Stars
- Meritorious Achievement Medals
- Distinguished Service Medal
- Gawad sa Kaunlaran
- Silver Wing Medal
- Military Merit Medals
- Coast Guard Merit Medals
- Military Civic Action Medals
- Parangal sa Kapanalig ng Sandatahang Lakas ng Pilipinas
- Military Commendation Medals
- Long Service Medal
- Anti-dissidence Campaign Medal
- Luzon Anti-Dissidence Campaign Medal
- Visayas Anti-Dissidence Campaign Medal
- Mindanao Anti-Dissidence Campaign Medal
- Disaster Relief and Rehabilitation Operations Ribbon
- Kalayaan Island Group Anti-Dissidence Campaign Medal
- Combat Commander's Badge
- Naval War College Badge
- Naval Surface Warfare Badge
- Command at Sea Badge (Breast Pin)
- Philippine Navy Instructor Badge (Senior Command Instructor Badge)

== Personal life ==
He is married, and he has 3 children.
