= Death of Darwin Dormitorio =

2019 hazing death in the Philippines

Darwin Dormitorio
- Born: Darwin Dioso Dormitorio; May 6, 1999; Cagayan de Oro, Philippines
- Died: September 18, 2019 (aged 20); Baguio, Philippines
- Cause of death: Death by hazing
- Resting place: Cagayan de Oro Gardens
- Education: Philippine Military Academy
- Occupation: Cadet student

Darwin Dioso Dormitorio (May 6, 1999 – September 18, 2019) died as the result of maltreatment at the Philippine Military Academy (PMA), Baguio, Benguet, Philippines. He was laid to rest on September 25, 2019, in his hometown of Cagayan de Oro and was given full military honors. In 2019, the Armed Forces of the Philippines (AFP), along with the National Bureau of Investigation (NBI), announced plans to investigate his death, and a House of Representatives resolution was filed seeking a congressional inquiry into the incident. In 2020, two PMA cadets were indicted for murder and three PMA doctors were also charged with participation in the crime.

== Cadet background ==
Cadet 4th class Dormitorio, who would have been a member of PMA Madasigon Class of 2023, was a 20-year old plebe of the Philippine Military Academy (PMA), the military school of the Armed Forces of the Philippines (AFP). His father, retired Army Col. William Dormitorio, is a graduate of PMA Marangal Class of 1974. Dormitorio was the youngest of the three children and his parents described him as "very kind" and "just quiet."

Before admittance into the PMA, Dormitorio was a freshman Agricultural and Biosystems Engineering student at Xavier University – Ateneo de Cagayan.

== Hazing incident ==
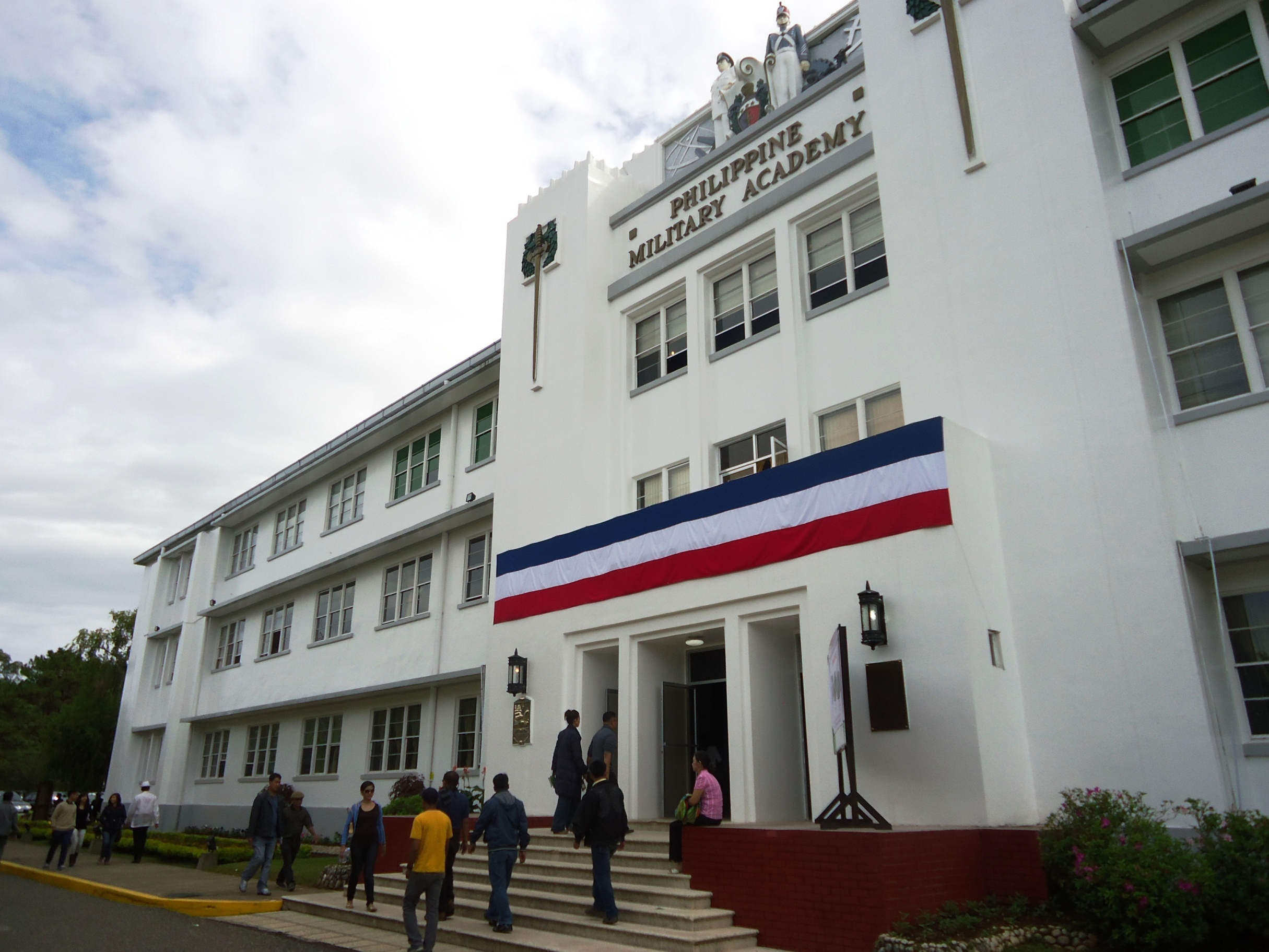
Facade of the Philippine Military Academy

Initial reports indicated that Dormitorio died from continuous vomiting after complaining of stomach pain while in his barracks in Fort Del Pilar, Baguio. However, subsequent reports revealed that he was found unconscious in Room 209 at the PMA's Mayo Hall Annex, at around 3:40 AM of September 17, 2019. He was still rushed to the Fort del Pilar Hospital in Baguio but was declared dead on arrival at around 5:15 AM. According to the PMA report, his cause of death was "blunt force trauma."

Dormitorio reportedly wrote a letter in late August 2019 telling his parents that he was confined in the hospital but was doing fine as he was adjusting to life in the PMA. The letter later circulated on social media. He told them that they can visit him but if they weren't available, a visit from his brother or sister would be fine. He asked his parents for extra money to purchase uniforms, and asked that his brother or sister bring him pizza and doughnuts should one of them visit him. He also told his family that he missed them and Brando, their pet Doberman. He gave the letter to another cadet's mother so that it could reach his parents. The letter prompted Dormitorio's brother Dexter to visit him in the hospital on August 25, 2019.

Dormitorio also wrote a report of the incident that happened on the night of August 21, 2019, detailing the punishment he got from PMA Cadets 3rd Class Shalimar Imperial and Felix Lumbag after spending half of his allowance. This was taken as an offense by the upperclassman cadets. Consequently, he was made to perform "pumping exercises" and "bridge under bunks." Dormitorio fell down several times during one of these punishments, which prompted Lumbag to punch him in the ribs.

On September 17, 2019, he was sent back to the hospital, where he was diagnosed with urinary tract infection and was later discharged the same day. According to Col. Allen Rae Co, Chief of Baguio Police Provincial Office, the victim was beaten up by the three suspects for losing Cadet First Class Axl Rey Sanopao's boots. Sanopao then ordered Imperial and Lumbag to "punish" the victim for not being able to find his boots. He was allegedly maltreated in the evening of September 17, 2019, by the two new suspects, who electrocuted his genitals using a taser flashlight.

== Suspects ==
On September 26, 2019, the police identified but refused to reveal the names of two more PMA upperclassmen as additional suspects in Dormitorio's death, along with Sanopao, Imperial, and Lumbag. The police are expected to file a case against the suspects for violating Republic Act 1105 or the Anti-Hazing Act of 2018 and murder, as it was established that the suspects had been planning to harm the victim since August 19, 2019.

A 2nd Class cadet was also added to the list of suspects on September 27, 2019, and another cadet was added on September 29, bringing the total to seven. The said suspect, who was also not identified, was the one who kicked the victim prior to his hospital confinement on September 1, 2019. The cadets were Cadet Imperial, Cadet Lumbay and Cadet Manalo.

== Trial ==
Baguio Municipal Trial Court for Cities Branch 1 convicted two PMA cadets Cadet 3rd Class Julius Carlo Tadena and Cadet 2nd Class Christian Zacarias of slight physical injuries, sentencing them to a month in prison.

Meanwhile, the court acquitted three military doctors, former PMA Station Hospital chief Lt. Col. Ceasar Candelaria and medical officers Capt. Flor Apple Apostol and Maj. Maria Ofelia Beloy, of reckless imprudence resulting in homicide. In November 2025, the Court of Appeals' 14th Division denied the petition of Dexter, his brother, seeking to hold the PMA and several medical officers administratively liable for allegedly failing to prevent the incident and properly treat his injuries. The court likewise upheld the Ombudsman's dismissal of administrative charges against four physicians—the three and Capt. Allain Saa; and two officers—Lt. Gen. Ronnie Evangelista, who has been retired since 2020, and Lt. Gen. Bartolome Vicente Bacarro; as there was no grave abuse of discretion. By late 2025, a separate administrative case for malpractice against the doctors remains pending before the Professional Regulation Commission.

Other cases for violation of the Anti-Hazing Law, Anti-Torture Act, and murder were filed before the Baguio Regional Trial Court Branch 5. On August 16, 2024, the court convicted Tadena, along with the principal suspects—Shalimar Imperial Jr. and Felix Lumbag Jr.—for hazing; with the latter two also for murder; and sentenced them to life imprisonment.

== In popular culture ==
This story was featured on the docudrama program Imbestigador in its 41st episode, "Dormitorio." Darwin Dormitorio was portrayed by Martin del Rosario, while his brother Dexter Dormitorio was portrayed by Biboy Ramirez.

== Reactions ==
=== Government ===
During a press briefing on September 23, 2019, Presidential Spokesperson Salvador Panelo said that President Rodrigo Duterte was "angry" about the hazing incident, which occurred just a year after he signed the Anti-Hazing Act of 2018 into law. The President then vowed to deliver justice for the victim. However, a year after signing the law, Duterte stated in a press conference that removing hazing in educational institutions is impossible, describing such measure as "permanent insanity".

In a statement, the Commission on Human Rights (CHR) called for the "total elimination" of hazing "in all schools and non-school-based organisations, including in military and army trainings" as it "curtails the right to life of individuals particularly the youth." Its regional office in the Cordillera Administrative Region will conduct its own investigation into this incident.

Department of the Interior and Local Government (DILG) Secretary Eduardo Año has also ordered the Philippine National Police (PNP) to be "transparent and not withhold information or whitewash" in investigating the hazing circumstances that led to the victim's death.

=== Police and armed forces ===
As a result of the incident, AFP Chief Lt. Gen. Noel Clement ordered the Inspector General of the Armed Forces to conduct a probe into the incident and to formulate changes in the PMA. Clement also asked all PMA cadets to undergo an orientation "to change their mindset, specifically in all their activities and dealings inside the academy." PMA Superintendent Lt. Gen. Ronnie Evangelista and commandant of the Corps of Cadets Brig. Gen. Bartolome Vicente Bacarro have already tendered their resignation as a matter of "command responsibility." Evangelista was replaced by Rear Admiral Allan Cusi while Bacarro was replaced by Brig. Gen. Romeo Brawner, the former commander of the Marawi-based 103rd Brigade. Meanwhile, Lt. Col. Cesar Candelaria and Capt. Flor Apple Apostol, who were in charge of the PMA station hospital that initially treated the victim, were also replaced by Lt. Col. Nerio Zabala as officer-in-charge.

On September 28, PNP chief Gen. Oscar Albayalde condemned the hazing incident, calling it an "'affront' to what the institution stands for."

=== Social media and public ===
In a tweet, Dormitorio's girlfriend Ashley Ravidas honored him by posing with his framed picture. "It's not easy loving a soldier, loving you has a high price to pay. I know my Cadet is watching over me, guiding me always. Continue serving up there, do what you love the most," she tweeted. The hashtag #JusticeForDarwin was used by netizens to share their thoughts about the incident and about hazing as a "form of discipline." Some slammed Senator Ronald "Bato" dela Rosa for "ignoring" anti-hazing laws.

The parents of Horacio Castillo III, the 22-year old freshman from University of Santo Tomas (UST) who died as a result of hazing on September 17, 2017, urged legislators in Congress to amend the Anti-Hazing Act of 2018. The Anti-Hazing Act was crafted in response to Castillo's death. The Castillos urged lawmakers to define hazing as a "heinous crime," hoping that it would "deter" those who plan to disregard and violate the said law.

=== Politics ===
Mayor Omaradji Pizarro of Kalilangan, Bukidnon, who is also Domitorio's uncle, called on legislators in Congress to review the implementation of the Anti-Hazing Act of 2018, which prohibits and penalizes hazing and regulates other forms of initiation rites in fraternities, sororities, and other organizations. Similarly, Cagayan de Oro 2nd District Representative Rufus Rodriguez filed a resolution to investigate Dormitorio's death in the Congress.

Several senators have also reacted to the incident. Panfilo Lacson, a member of PMA Class 1971, has dismissed calls for an inquiry into the incident, saying that the Anti-Hazing Act of 2018 was "very clear" and that the incident was "a clear violation of the Anti-Hazing Law as amended." Ralph Recto called on the PMA to "relentlessly pursue" delivering justice to the victim while emphasizing that PMA cadets are "people's investments," since producing one PMA graduate costs PHP 2.982 million. Ronald "Bato" dela Rosa lamented the resignation of Evangelista as head of PMA, calling him a "good officer whose career was wasted because of that very unfortunate incident." Former Magdalo Representative Gary Alejano described Dormitorio's death an "isolated incident".

Ako Bicol Representative Alfredo Garbin Jr. believed that the hazing can be only prevented if the suspects are arrested, charged, and convicted.

== See also ==
- List of hazing deaths in the Philippines
- Death of John Matthew Salilig
