= Security sector governance and reform in the Philippines =

The process of security sector governance and reform in the Philippines – which involves professionalizing, civilianizing, and modernizing/capacitating the Philippine government's security institutions to align them with ideals of good governance and with principles such as human rights, freedom of information, and the rule of civilian law – has been a continuing process since the establishment of the Fifth Philippine Republic after the 1986 People Power Revolution, before the concept had even been fully defined internationally in the 1990s.

== Government sectors involved ==
=== Core security actors ===
In the Philippines, security sector reform (SSR) is focused on "core security actors" that are allowed by the State to use violence in the performance of their mandates: most prominently the Armed Forces of the Philippines, Philippine National Police, and the Philippine Coast Guard (PCG), but also the Philippine Drug Enforcement Agency (PDEA); the National Bureau of Investigation (NBI); immigration, custom, and border management officers; local security units including village watch organizations (barangay tanods), and state paramilitary forces such as the Citizen Armed Force Geographical Units (CAFGU).

=== Other state sector actors ===
Also involved whenever their mandates overlap with state security are the Criminal Justice System, Intelligence Services, the Judicial System, and the various "Management and Oversight Bodies, such as the Department of National Defense (DND), Department of Interior and Local Government (DILG), the Department of Foreign Affairs (DFA), the Philippine Congress and its various security-related committees, and so on.

== Involvement of civil society ==
For the most part, oversight of the Philippine state's security actors has fallen on government agencies through the constitutional system of checks and balances - most prominently, congress and the Commission on Human Rights. But civil society organizations have also become involved in civilianizing, professionalizing, modernizing, and capacitating the Philippine state's security institutions, depending on how much emphasis each President, as Commander in Chief, places on civil society engagement.

Given a greater emphasis on Philippine Defense Reform (PDR) beginning in 2010, a shift towards engagement with Civil Society Organizations was put in place under the Internal Peace and Security Plan (IPSP) of 2010, and similar principles were enshrined in the 2016 AFP-Development Support and Security Plan (DSSP) of the next administration. However, civil society is no longer identified as a major strategic priority under the 15 year AFP Transformation Roadmap initiated during the Duterte administration, as it had been under the 2003-2016 PDR Program.

== Professionalization ==
The AFP went through a number of changes during the 21 years under Ferdinand Marcos, notably in terms of the promotion of officers based on loyalty and connections to the president, and in terms of being given the task of implementing Martial Law, which led to officers being involved in human rights violations and in corruption. The years from 1965 to 1986 are thus considered to have marked a decline for AFP in terms of its traditional values of civilian supremacy and professionalism, leading to a need to actively professionalize the AFP. The 1990 Davide Commission and 2003 Feliciano Commission made recommendations towards the professionalization of the AFP as early as 1990 and 2003, respectively.

Steps the AFP sought to take towards professionalization under the Philippine Defense Reform Program from 2003 to 2016 included the development of "integrity development programs", programmatic efforts to improve the quality of service performance, continuing development programs for commanders and staff, and reforms in the recruitment of enlisted personnel.

Alongside capability development, "professionalization of all ranks" is one of two strategic priorities identified by the 15 year AFP Transformation Roadmap initiated during the Duterte administration.

== Civilianization ==
The need to assert civilian control of the military was a reform agenda which began being addressed almost as soon as Ferdinand Marcos was deposed by the 1986 People Power Revolution; within a year of Marcos' ouster, the 1987 Constitution of the Philippines enshrined the principle of civilian supremacy over the military. After the various coup attempts of the 1980s, the recommendations of the Davide Commission included the dissolution of the Philippine Constabulary as a service under the AFP, resulting in the eventual creation of the civilian Philippine National Police. In 1998, Executive Orders 475 and 477 asserting the civilian nature of the Philippine Coast Guard and transferring it from the Philippine Navy to the Department of Transportation and Communications (DOTC) were signed by President Fidel Ramos.

In a December 2013 paper for the National Defense College of the Philippines’ National Security Review, former Department of National Defense Undersecretary Rodel Cruz identified some aspects of civilianization which need attention under security sector reform as:

- Increasing civilian capacity for defense management;
- Establishing an active constituency supportive of Security Sector Reform;
- Prudent budget preparation and execution;
- Supporting a local defense industry;
- Intelligent and coherent policy development and execution; and
- the passage of an updated National Defense Act.

== History ==
The new 1987 Constitution of the Philippines enshrined the principle of civilian supremacy over the military, "renounces war as an instrument of national policy," and even capped annual defense spending such that it should not exceed the government's budget education in that year. After the various coup attempts of the 1980s, the recommendations of the Davide Commission pushed forward changes which would set future security sector reform initiatives on their course. The Feliciano Commission formed after the 2003 Oakwood mutiny is also credited for pushing the agenda of security sector reform forward.

During the term of President Fidel V. Ramos, the AFP modernization program of 1995 (RA 7898) was passed, seeking to modernize the AFP to a level where it can effectively and fully perform its constitutional mandate, and identifying specific actions to be taken to achieve this end over a 15-year period ending in 2010. However, the implementation of the act was sidelined by the 1997 Asian financial crisis.

Capacity building in the form of modernization resumed in earnest in during the administration of President Benigno Aquino III from 2010 to 2016, with the AFP receiving a P41.2 billion ($1.7 billion) modernization budget and the PNP receiving a modernization budget of around P9 Billion; and the administration also worked to strengthen defense cooperation with Japan and the United States. Roadmaps for the transformation of the AFP (until 2028) and PNP (until 2030) were formulated, and Multisectoral Governance Councils (MSGC) to discuss the progress of these transformation roadmaps, made out of business and other civilian leaders, were put in place for both organizations. Community engagement efforts such as the “Pulis Nyo Po sa Barangay” (PSB) program - later renamed the Community and Service Oriented Policing (CSOP) program - and Oplan Katok, which aimed to ensure either the retrieval or registration of loose firearms while maintaining a positive institutional reputation within the communities.

In 2012, Republic Act No. 10349 amended RA 7898, extending it another 15 years until 2027. The act included new provisions for the acquisition of equipment for all the branches of AFP.

During the administration of President Rodrigo Duterte from 2016 to 2022, capacity building has continued in the form of the approval a modernization budget of about P300 billion ($5.6 billion) for the AFP, and a P128-billion Revitalization and Capability Enhancement Program for the PNP has been passed by congress, set to begin implementation in 2022 and lasting 10 years. The administration worked to strengthen ties with China and Russia. However, the Duterte administration did not prioritize community relations as part of its operational directions, and the role of the Multisectoral Governance Councils (MSGC) was reduced.

== See also ==
- Security sector governance and reform
- Armed Forces of the Philippines
- Philippine National Police
- Red-tagging in the Philippines
