= Philippine Military Academy =

Military academy in the Philippines

Coordinates: 16.3608931°N 120.616839°E

- Akademiya Militar ng Pilipinas
- Former names: Philippine Constabulary Officer's School (1905–1926); Philippine Constabulary Academy (1926–1935)
- Motto: Courage, Integrity and Loyalty
- Type: Service academy
- Established: October 25, 1898 (Note: Date of establishment as the Academia Militar.)
- Affiliations: NDCP, AFP
- Superintendent: LtGen Michael Logico, PA
- Commandant of Cadets: BGen Leah Lorenzo–Santiago, PA
- Location: Fort Gen. Gregorio H. del Pilar, Baguio, Philippines
- Campus: Fort Gen. Gregorio H. del Pilar 373 ha (3,730,000 m^{2})
- Alma Mater song: "PMA, Oh Hail to Thee."
- Colours: Gray
- Nicknames: PMA Cavaliers - "Mistah" or "Bok"
- Website: www.pma.edu.ph

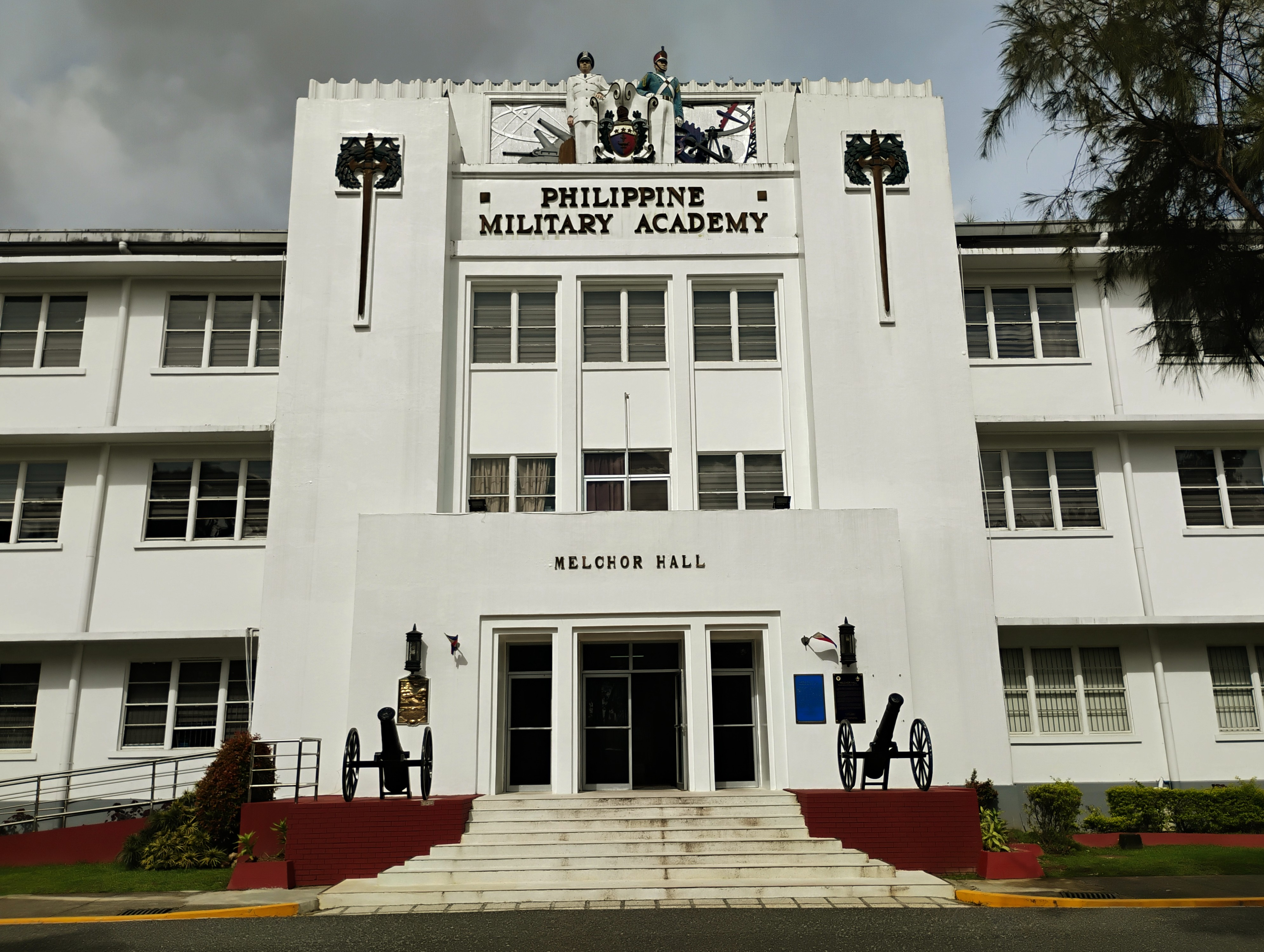
Melchor Hall

The Philippine Military Academy (Filipino: Akademiya Militar ng Pilipinas / Spanish: Academia Militar de Filipinas), also referred to by its acronym PMA, is a military academy in Baguio City, Philippines. It was established on December 21, 1936, by the virtue of National Defense Act of 1935. It is patterned after the United States Military Academy, in West Point, New York.

Cadet candidates for admission must undergo and pass series of testing (Written, Physical, Medical and Neuro-Psychiatric); around 400 men and women enter the academy each June. Students are officers-in-training and referred to as "cadets" or collectively as the "Cadet Corps Armed Forces of the Philippines" (CCAFP). Tuition and monthly allowances are fully funded by the government in exchange for an active duty service obligation upon graduation.

The academic program grants a Bachelor of Science in Management, Major in Security Studies with a curriculum that maintains a high level standard of cadet's performance in academics, military tactics and sports & physical fitness. Graduates are commissioned as second lieutenants in the Philippine Army and Philippine Air Force and as ensigns in the Philippine Navy.

== History ==
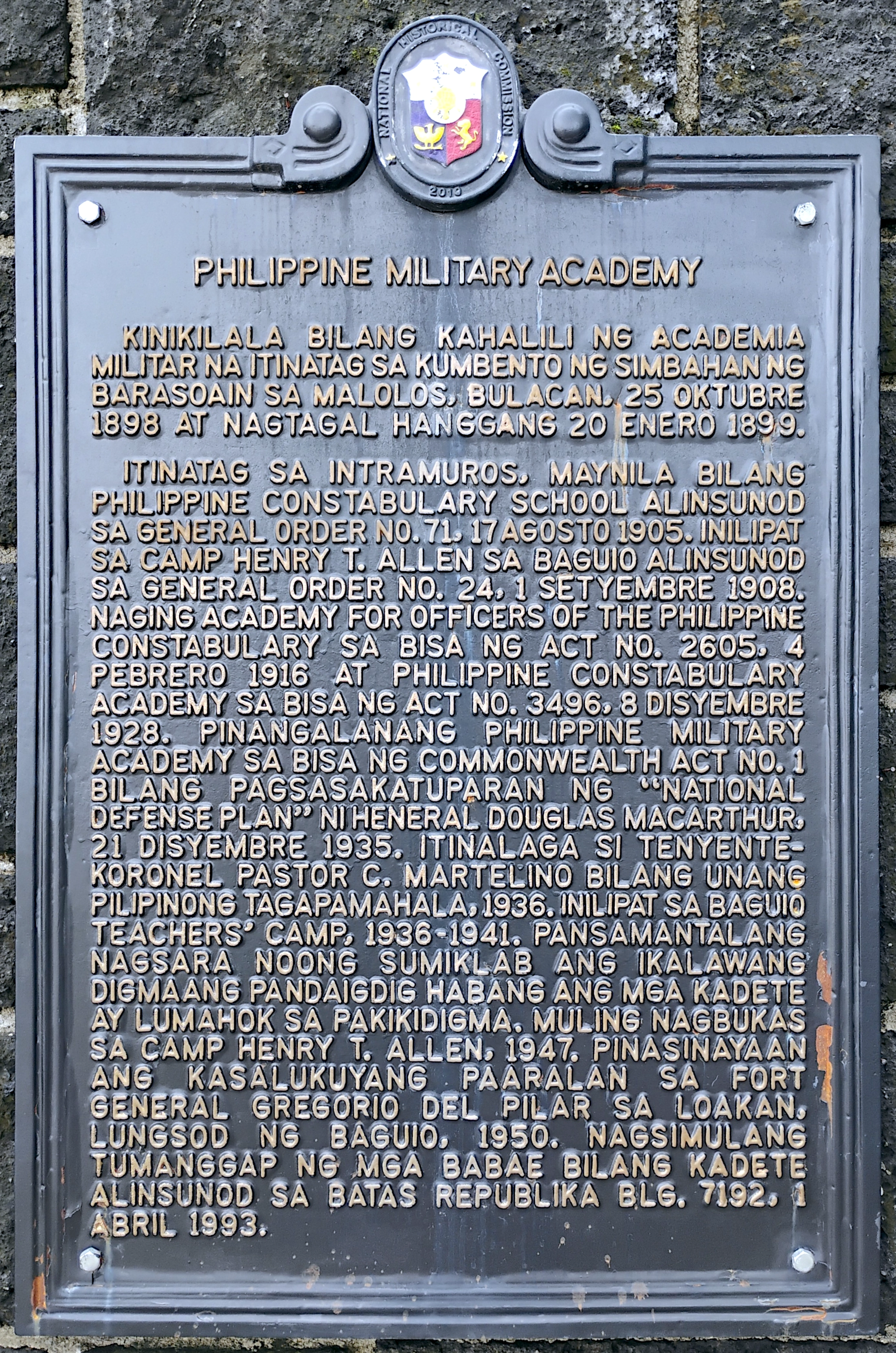
Historical marker installed in 2019

The present-day PMA traces its roots from the establishment of the Academia Militar in Malolos, Bulacan on October 25, 1898 by virtue of a decree issued by the first president of the young Philippine Republic, General Emilio Aguinaldo. Its existence was short-lived, barely four months old, up to January 20, 1899, when hostilities between the Americans and Filipinos erupted.

An Officer's School of the Philippine Constabulary was established on February 17, 1905, within the walls of Intramuros, Manila. This school was relocated to Baguio on September 1, 1908, at Camp Henry Allen where it would stay for many years to come. On February 4, 1916, a cadet academy denominated the Academy for officers of the Philippine Constabulary was created for training and instructing cadets and preparing them for service as commissioned officers of the Philippine Constabulary or of any other armed force of the Philippine Government which might later be created.

Just months later, on October 23, 1916, during the 4th Philippine Legislature session, Senator Hadji Butu Abdul Baqui, representing Mindanao and Sulu, sponsored his first bill, Senate Bill No. 9 creating a law establishing a military academy in the country and to require military instruction in colleges and universities. On the same day, he also sponsored Senate Bill No. 10 creating a law to establish a naval academy. Three months later, US President Woodrow Wilson congratulated Senator Hadji Butu "for being the first among those in the upper house to introduce measures for their establishment", saying that military or naval training will be a good thing for the young men of the country.

On December 8, 1928, the academy was renamed as The Philippine Constabulary Academy.

The National Defense Act was approved on December 21, 1935, creating the Army of the Philippines and incorporating the Constabulary into that organization. The Act also established a Constabulary Division within the PMA and a Philippine Military Academy (PMA), but specified that the PMA operation was not a Constabulary function. The PMA was modeled after the United States Military Academy with officers from the Philippine Scouts and regular United States Army as instructors and members of the general staff. The PMA Class of 1940, with 79 graduates, was the pioneer batch to complete four years of training. Quirico Evangelista and Reynaldo Mendoza of Class '40 composed the PMA alma mater song, "PMA, Oh Hail to Thee."

With the outbreak of the Second World War, training was disrupted at the PMA with Classes 1942 and 1943 being graduated prematurely and assigned to combat units in Bataan and other parts of the country. Many of these young officers perished in the war.

After the war, the academy was reopened on May 5, 1947, at Camp Henry T. Allen in Baguio and, due to its increasing need for larger grounds, was soon moved to its present location at Fort General Gregorio H. del Pilar, Loakan, some ten kilometers from downtown Baguio. The main building, Melchor Hall, was completed in 1949 under the supervision of military engineer Lt. Pacifico C. Cabrera, a decorated WWII hero, who later as a full colonel, became Chief of Engineers of the AFP. During the 1960s, as a need for more well-rounded individuals was found to be desirable, and socio-humanistic courses were added to the school's curriculum.

On 18 March 1987, the PMA was targeted by a bomb attack that killed a colonel, two enlisted men and a civilian woman, and injured 38 people, including 17 civilians. The explosion occurred at a grandstand during a rehearsal for the annual graduation ceremonies that were to be attended by President Corazon Aquino. Some sources suggested that "disgruntled military elements" may have been responsible.

During the August 1987 Philippine coup attempt, all 863 cadets of the academy mounted a silent demonstration of support for the coup before donning combat gear and reiterating their support over the radio. After a briefing by two senior Reform the Armed Forces Movement members, the group set out at midnight on 29 August to launch a takeover of Baguio, only to abort the plan after being informed by sentries of the coup's failure. The incident prompted Vice President Salvador Laurel and other government officials to launch a dialogue with them, while the academy administration suspended classes for two days and confined the entire student body inside the campus for 90 days.

In 1993, the PMA admitted its first female cadets and introduced specialization based on branch-of-service. Senator Santanina Rasul authored Republic Act 6949, the law recognizing March 8 each year as National Women’s Day in the Philippines and together with the late Senator Raul Roco authored Republic Act 7192 or the Women in Development and Nation Building Act. The RA 7192 outlawed discrimination against women, opening the doors of the Philippine Military Academy to women, and mandating that a substantial portion of government funds at all levels be used for programs that would benefit and develop women's capabilities. Senator Rasul is the daughter in law of the late Senator Hadji Butu who authored the bill in 1916 to establish a military academy. The first female cadets graduated from the academy in 1997.

The academy also has a museum exhibiting historical weapons and tanks of the Armed Forces of the Philippines. The Air Power Park was opened on February 18, 2022, to exhibit a collection of retired aircraft of the Philippine Air Force (PAF). The collection included the SIAI Marchetti S.211, Cessna T-41 Mescalero, Bell UH-1 Iroquois, SIAI-Marchetti SF.260, Northrop F-5, McDonnell Douglas MD-520MG Defender, Vought F-8 Crusader, and MBB Bo 105.

== Curriculum ==
=== Academic program ===
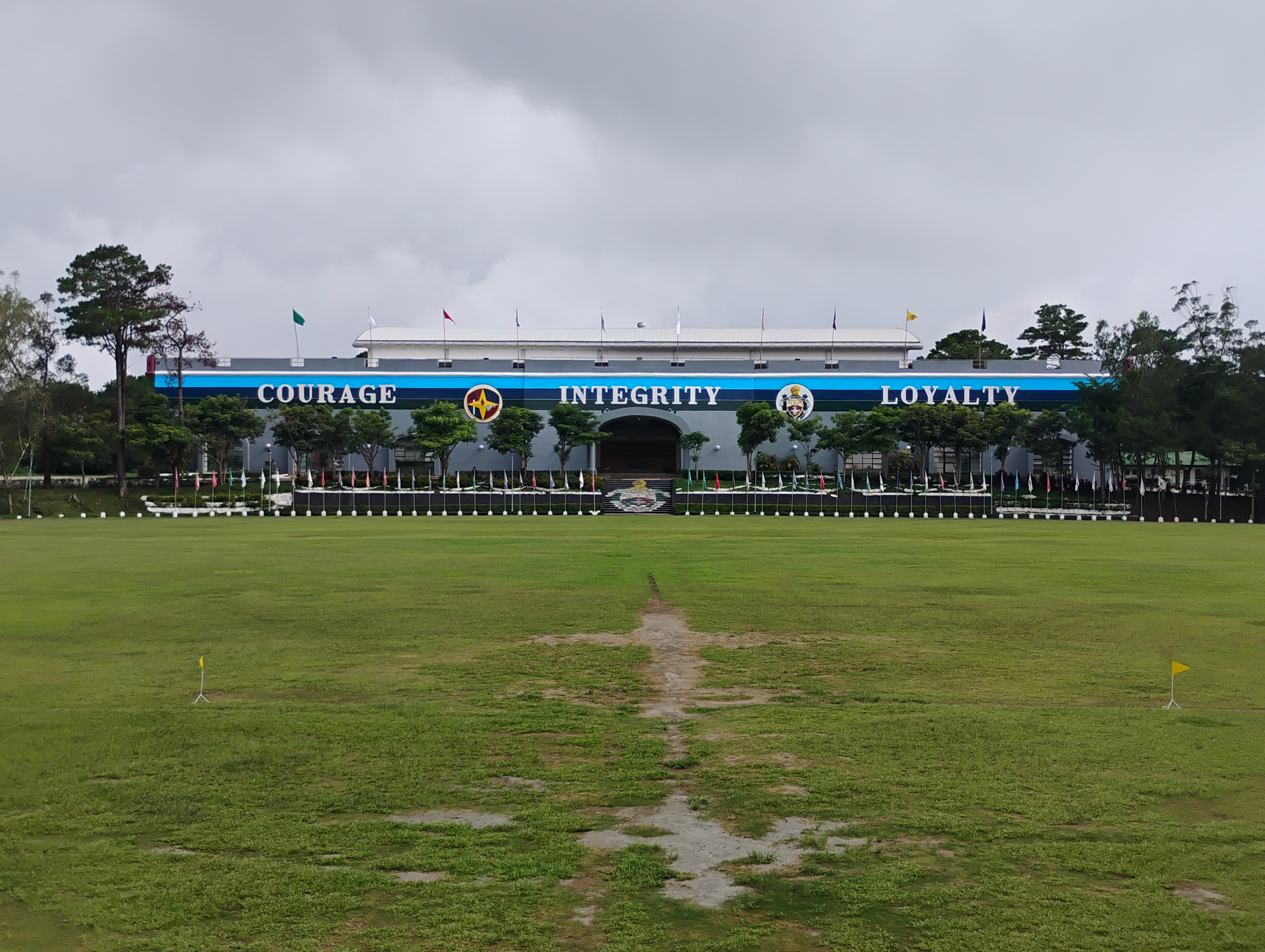
PMA Grandstand and Borromeo Field

Headed by the Dean of Academics, the academic program has both military and civilian male and female instructors. It has the following seven departments:

- Department of Managerial Sciences
- Department of Mathematics
- Department of Humanities
- Department of Physical Sciences
- Department of Engineering Sciences
- Department of Social Sciences
- Department of Information and Computing Sciences
- Department of National Security Studies

On June 1, 2019, the PMA upgraded its academic curriculum; every cadet now focuses on national security management in response to the growing national security threats at home and overseas. Upon completing the 4-year program, cadets graduate and earn the degree of BS in National Security Management (BSNSM) and commissioned as 2nd Lieutenant or Ensign in the service branches of the Armed Forces by the authority of the President. The academic course programs are accredited as a general rule by the Commission on Higher Education.

=== Military program ===
This program is headed by the Commandant of Cadets and is responsible for the professional military training, character development, leadership, and physical training of the cadets. The mission of the Tactics Group is likewise carried out by the tactical officers who are responsible for the different companies of the Cadet Corps. This group is made up of the following departments:

- Department of Leadership Development
- Department of Physical Education
- Department of Ground Warfare
- Department of Air Warfare
- Department of Naval Warfare

== Cadet life ==
=== Four classes ===
Unlike other colleges and universities, cadets are not referred to as freshmen, sophomores, juniors, or seniors. They are classified as fourth class, third class, second class, and first class cadets.

- Fourth class Cadets are the first year students. In the academy, they are called "plebes" and are the equivalent of the college freshmen in civilian universities. The first day of plebe hood starts with the Reception Ceremonies on June 1 of each year. Then, they undergo an eight-week summer training or "beast barracks" during which time they are indoctrinated with the military and cadet systems of training. During this period, the plebes form the New Cadet Battalion and their training is handled by the tactical officers and upper-class cadets forming the "Plebe Detail." After the beast barracks, the plebes are formally accepted into the ranks of the Cadet Corps in another ceremony called Incorporation which is held during the last week of July.
- Third class Cadets are the sophomores in civilian universities, and are referred to as "yearlings" in the academy. Upon completion of fourth class year, the yearling adjusts to life as an upper class cadet. Although they are the least ranking of the upper class cadets, they are now entitled to the privileges of being upper class cadets. One of their responsibilities is being a "buddy" to a plebe. As buddies, they set the examples of how a cadet should behave and they are responsible for ensuring that the plebes conform with the standards of cadet ship.
- Second class Cadets are also called the "cows". The second class year marks the point at which the cadet starts to specialize according to the branch of service he or she has elected to join upon graduation. Thus, the second class cadets may no longer take the same subjects as that of some of his or her classmates. They now take different subjects depending on their choice of branch of service after graduation and fields of specialization. Within the cadet chain of command, the second class cadets now act as squad leaders. Moreover, in the absence of the first class cadets, they take over the responsibility of running the Cadet Corps.
- First class Cadets, also known as "firsties", are the ruling class and as such they occupy the major positions of responsibility in the cadet chain of command. They are designated the chairmen and cadet-in-charge of the various committees, clubs and corps squads. They also enjoy certain privileges peculiar only to the "firsties". Their academics are also more specialized as they now embark on the final year of their training for future officership in the Armed Forces of the Philippines. These cadets receive their military officership commissions and academic degrees equivalent to degrees from civilian universities in May every year.

=== Organization ===
The Cadet Corps is organized into a regiment. The highest ranking cadet, the Regimental Commander, is traditionally known as the First Captain or "Baron". The regiment is organized into four battalions. Within each battalion there are two companies. Companies are lettered A through H (Alfa to Hawk). First class cadets hold key leadership positions within the regiment from the First Captain down to platoon leaders within the companies. First class cadets hold the rank of cadet captain and cadet lieutenant. Second class cadets hold the rank of cadet sergeant and serve as squad leaders, third class cadets hold the rank of cadet corporal, and fourth class cadets as cadet private.

=== Honor code and system ===
The Philippine Military Academy is governed by an honor code, and it binds the cadets to the following principle — “We, the cadets, do not lie, cheat, steal, nor tolerate among us those who do.”. Cheating, lying, and stealing are major honor code violations. Cadets who will be charged for violating the honor code are subjected to series of trials conducted by Cadets from Honor Committee. When a cadet is found guilty for violating the honor code, he/she will be banned from cadetship. One of the most sensationalized cases was during 2014; the lying case of ex-cadet Aldrin Jeff Cudia.

==== Hazing videos ====
On October 23, 2019, two videos, dated 2017 and 2018, of hazing by the cadets were uploaded on social media. The 2018 video shows a plebe-cadet being punched and kicked by an upper class cadet. Another upper class cadet wearing earphones is seen in the background of the video. In the video, two plebe-cadets were doing squats; when one of them collapses, he is kicked as punishment by an upperclassman. The attack stops when someone opens the door to inspect the room. The 2017 video shows four upperclassmen with two plebes. An upperclassman is seen using his helmet to repeatedly hit one of the plebe's hands and the back of the other plebe. While the upperclassman was hitting the plebes, the other upper class cadets in the background were seen watching and laughing, actively bystanding and allowing the hazing to continue.

Of the six upper-class cadets seen attacking the plebes in the video, five were transferred to the PMA holding center while the academy investigated the incident; on the other hand, the sixth cadet was discharged from the academy due to an "Honor Code" violation.

== Admission requirements ==
- Natural born Filipino citizen
- Physically fit and of good moral character
- Single and has never been married
- Must pass the PMA Entrance Examination
- No Administrative / Criminal Case
- At least High School Graduate with 85% GPA or must graduate not later than June of the year following the date of examination taken for Grade 12 students (K-12)
- Height Requirement for both Male and Female is 5 feet (not to exceed 6’4″ for both)
- At least 17 years old but not a day older than a 22 years on June 1 of the year following the date of examination taken

== Superintendents ==
The following list are incomplete:

Name	Term	Notes and Ref.
Capt. Manuel T. Sityar	1898	(1898 Revolutionary Army School)
Capt. Arthur S. Guthrie	15 Apr 1905 – 14 Nov 1905	Philippine Constabulary Officer's School
Maj. Thomas I. Mair	15 Nov 1905 – 4 Mar 1907	Philippine Constabulary Officer's School
Capt. John B. Bennet	5 Mar 1907 – 30 Jun 1907	Philippine Constabulary Officer's School
Capt. Charles J. Kindler	1 Jul 1907 – 30 Aug 1907	Philippine Constabulary Officer's School
Lt. Col. Thomas I Mair	31 Aug 1907 – 23 Dec 1907	Philippine Constabulary Officer's School
Capt. James F. Quinn	5 Jan 1908 – 11 Sep 1908	Philippine Constabulary Officer's School
Capt. John B Bennet	12 Sep – 11 Dec 1908	Philippine Constabulary Officer's School
Capt. James F. Quinn	12 Dec 1908 – 14 May 1910	Philippine Constabulary Officer's School
Lt. Col. John R. White	15 May 1910 – 21 Aug 1910	Philippine Constabulary Officer's School
Lt. Col. Edward N. Griffith	15 May 1910 – 21 Aug 1910	Philippine Constabulary Officer's School
Capt. Charles K. Kilbourne	1 Oct 1910 – 1 Jan 1911	Philippine Constabulary Officer's School
1Lt. Joseph B. Pate	11 Mar 1911 – 2 May 1911	Philippine Constabulary Officer's School
2Lt. Frank M. Sowers	3 May 1911 – 17 Aug 1911	Philippine Constabulary Officer's School
Maj. James F. Quinn	18 Aug 1911 – 17 Feb 1913	Philippine Constabulary Officer's School
Lt. Col. James C. Rhea	30 May 1913 – 14 Dec 1913	Philippine Constabulary Officer's School
1Lt. Floyd O. Tobey	22 Dec 1913 – 29 Apr 1914	Philippine Constabulary Officer's School
Col. John R. White	30 May 1914 – 22 Sep 1914	Philippine Constabulary Officer's School
Capt. Jean A. Jeancon	22 Sep 1914 – 17 Nov 1914	Philippine Constabulary Officer's School
Maj. George S. Holmes	18 Nov 1914 – 3 Sep 1917	Philippine Constabulary Officer's School
Maj. Harry G. Upham	4 Sep 1917 – 10 Mar 1918	Philippine Constabulary Officer's School
Capt. Antonio Costosa	5 Mar 1918 – 9 Mar 1919	Philippine Constabulary Officer's School
Maj. Clarence H. Bowers	10 Mar 1919 – 15 Aug 1921	Philippine Constabulary Officer's School
Capt. Jose N. Evangelista	16 Aug 1921 – 22 Jan 1922	Philippine Constabulary Officer's School
Col. Ralph W. Jones	23 Jan 1922 – 25 Dec 1923	Philippine Constabulary Officer's School
Maj. Jose N. Evangelista	26 Dec 1923 – 31 Mar 1924	Philippine Constabulary Officer's School
Maj. Dorr H. Malone	28 Apr 1924 – 15 Sep 1924	Philippine Constabulary Officer's School
Maj. Charles E. Livingston	16 Sep 1924 – 30 Jun 1927	Philippine Constabulary Officer's School
Lt. Col. Luther R. Stevens	1 Jul 1927 – 31 Dec 1927	Philippine Constabulary Officer's School
Lt. Col. Robert A. Duckworth Ford	1 Jan 1928 – 28 Dec 1932	Philippine Constabulary Academy
Col. Orville M. Johnson	29 Dec 1932 – 21 December 1935	Philippine Constabulary Academy
Col. Orville M. Johnson	21 December 1935 – 18 May 1936	start as Philippine Military Academy
Maj. Telesforo C. Martinez	1936	
Capt. Calixto Duque	1936	
Lt. Col. Pastor Martelino	1 Jun 1936 – 31 May 1940	
Maj. Alejandro Garcia	1 Jun 1940 – 31 Aug 1940	
Col. Rafael Garcia	1 Sep 1940 – 26 Aug 1941	
Col. Fidel Segundo	27 Aug 1941 – 14 Dec 1941	
Lt. Col. Ramon Enriquez	5 Nov 1946 – 28 Apr 1947	
Lt. Col. Tirso G. Fajardo	28 Apr 1947 – 26 Mar 1951	
Lt. Col. Patricio B. Borromeo	26 Mar 1951 – 31 May 1955	
Col. Marcos G. Soliman	1 Jun 1955 – 3 Jun 1958	
Col. Oscar Rialp	4 Jun 1958 – 2 Nov 1958	
Capt. Alberto N. Navarete	3 Nov 1958 – 4 Nov 1958	
BGen. Manuel T. Flores	10 Nov 1958 – 28 Feb 1962	
Col. Eustacio D. Orobia	1 Mar 1962 – 31 Aug 1963	
Col. Godofredo F. Mendoza	1 Sep 1963 – 1 Oct 1964	
Col. Cesar B. Jimenez	11 Oct 1964 – 1 Nov 1964	
Col. Felimon C. Reodica	4 Nov 1964 – 1 Jan 1965	
Col. Amos M. Francia	2 Jan 1965 – 14 Jun 1966	
Col. Reynaldo A. Mendoza	15 Jun 1966 – 14 Aug 1967	
Col. Ernesto F. Santos	15 Aug 1967 – 4 Apr 1968	
Col. Cesar M. Garcia	5 Apr 1968 – 31 Mar 1970	
Col. Aurelio S. Ugalde	1 Apr 1970 – 8 Jan 1971	
Capt. Gregorio P. Lim	9 Jan 1971 – 1 Jun 1972	
Col. Ernesto S. Gidaya	10 Jun 1972 – 1 Jun 1976	
Col. Florencio F. Magsino	2 Jun 1976 – 30 Apr 1978	
BGen. Angel G. Kanapi	8 May 1978 – 28 May 1982	
Col. Jose Ma. Carlos L. Zumel	29 May 1982 – 27 Feb 1986	
Col. Maximino M. Bejar	28 Feb 1986 – 29 Feb 1986	
Col. Rodolfo G. Biazon	1 Mar 1986 – 22 Jul 1987	
COMMO Rogelio A. Dayan	28 Jul 1987 – 20 Mar 1988	
BGen. Andrew R. Francisco	28 Mar 1988 – 31 Jul 1989	
BGen. Arturo T. Enrile	1 Aug 1989 – 4 Apr 1991	
RADM Virgilio Q. Marcelo	10 Apr 1991 – 31 Jul 1993	
MGen. Rodolfo S. Estrellado	1 Aug 1993 – 15 Jun 1996	
BGen. Victor A. Mayo	16 Jun 1996 – 21 Jul 1998	
Cmdr. Juan A. de Leon, Jr.	21 Jul 1998 – 23 October 1999	
BGen. Jaime de los Santos	23 October 1999 – 15 January 2000	
MGen. Melchor Rosales	15 January 2000 – 6 January 2001	
MGen. Manuel Carranza	6 January 2001 – 28 June 2001	
MGen. Rufo "Rufus" de Veyra	28 June 2001 – 11 April 2002	
MGen. Edilberto Adan	11 April 2002 – 27 July 2004	
Lt. Gen. Cristolito Balaoing	27 July 2004 – 30 January 2006	
Lt. Gen. Leopoldo Maligalig	30 January 2006 – 13 November 2008	
B.Gen Rommel A. Gomez	13 November 2008 - 11 December 2008	
VAdm. Leonardo Calderon	11 December 2008 – 14 March 2011	
Lt. Gen. Nonato Peralta Jr.	14 March 2011 – 24 November 2012	
Lt. Gen. Irineo Espino	24 Nov 2012 – 10 April 2013	
VAdm. Edgar Abogado	10 April 2013 – 17 Feb 2014	
Lt. Gen. Oscar P. Lopez	17 Feb 2014 – Feb 13, 2016	
Lt. Gen. Donato San Juan III	12 Feb 2016 – 12 October 2018	
Lt. Gen. Ronnie Evangelista	12 Oct 2018 – 1 Oct 2019	
VAdm. Allan Cusi	1 October 2019 – 16 Nov 2020	
Lt. Gen. Ferdinand Cartujano	16 November 2020 – 26 June 2022	
BGen. Julius Tomines	June 2022 – 13 Aug 2022	
Lt. Gen. Rowen S. Tolentino	13 Aug 2022 – 20 Jul 2024	
V.Adm. Caesar Bernard N. Valencia	20 Jul 2024 - 22 July 2026	
Lt. Gen. Michael G. Logico	22 July 2026 - present	

Acting in italic

== Gallery ==
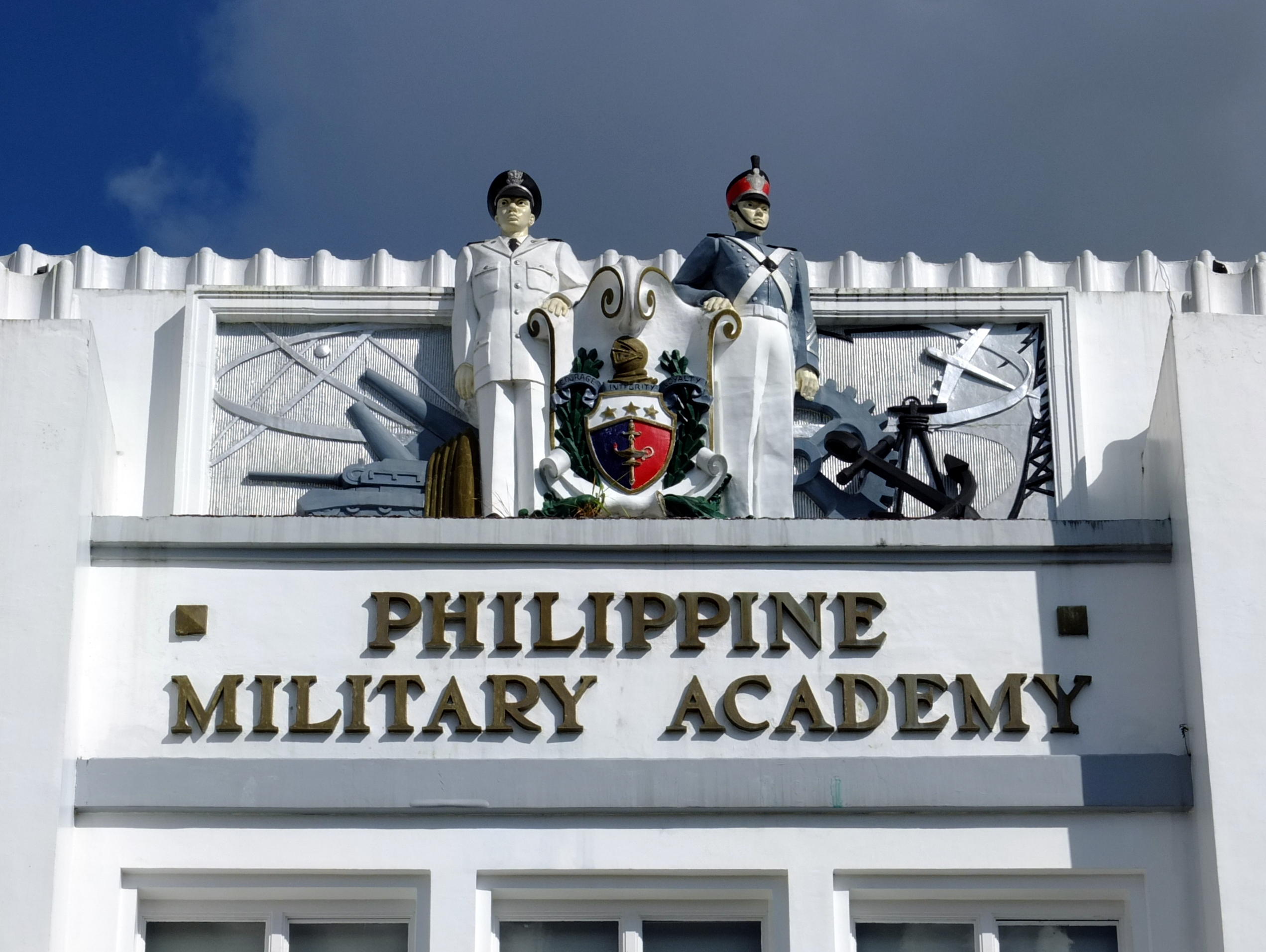
Detail of parapet of Melchor Hall, PMA

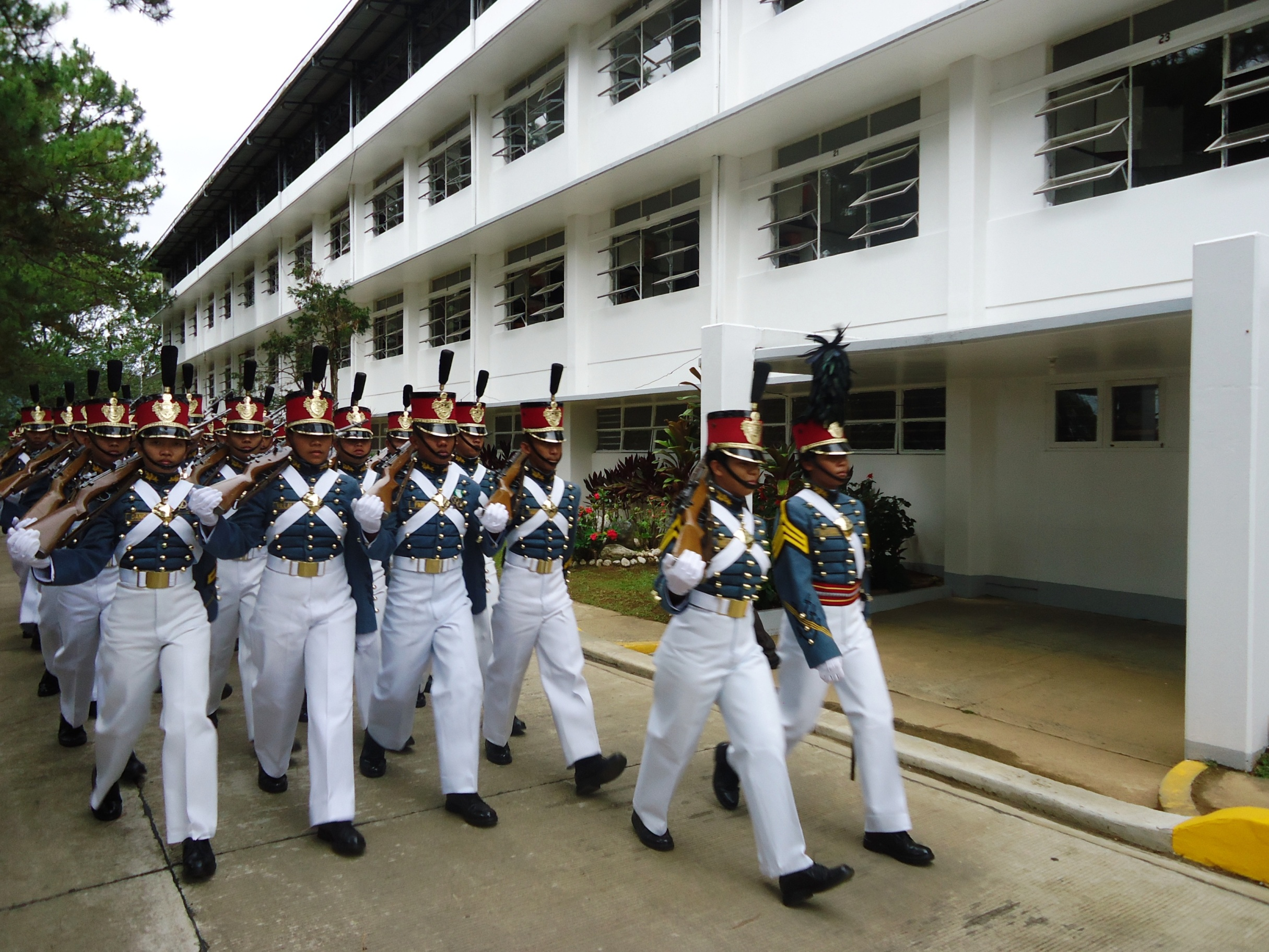
Graduating PMA cadets at the PMA Alumni Homecoming, 2012

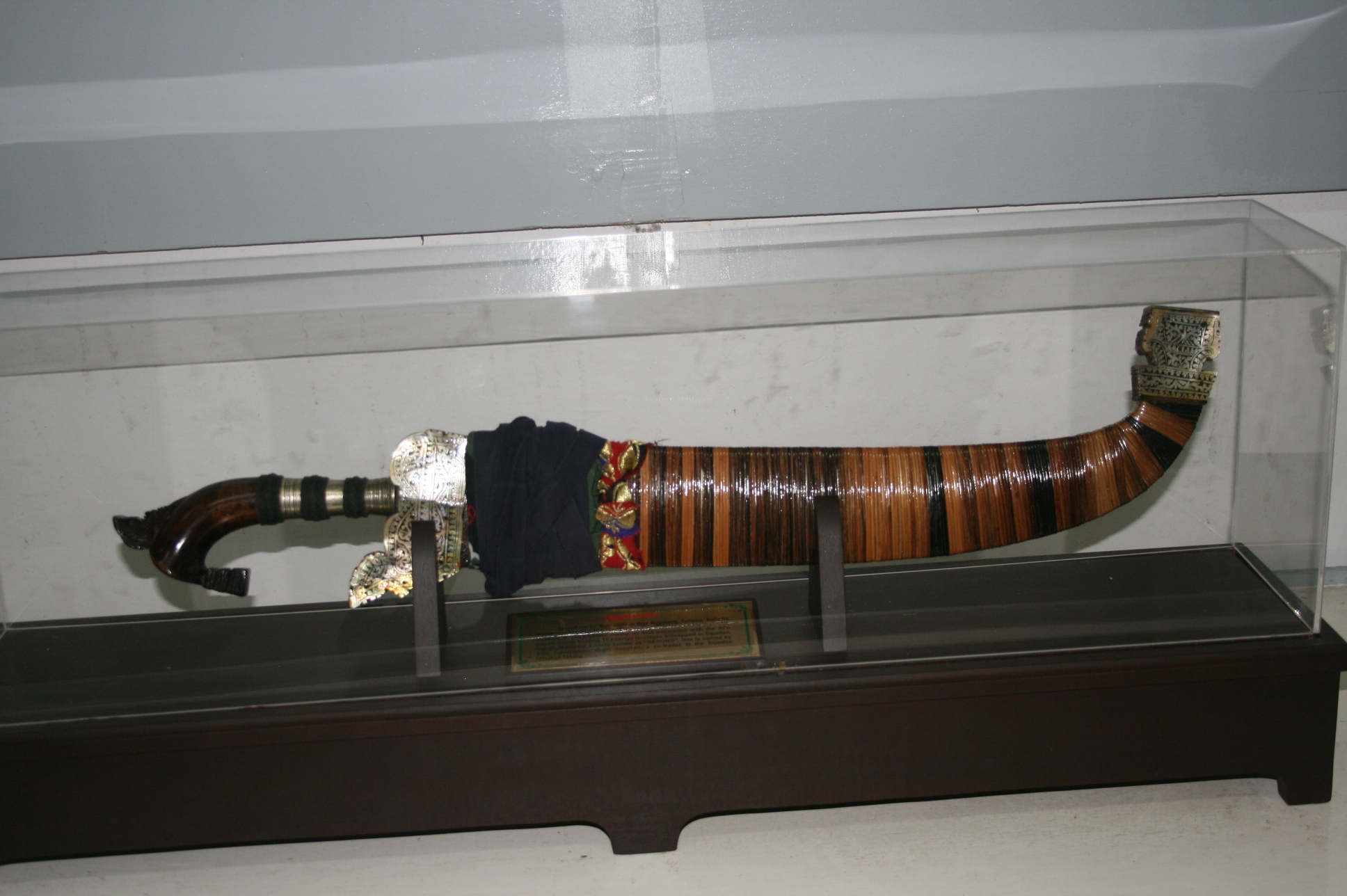
Barong sword of Mujib Susukan, part of war booty displayed at the Philippine Military Academy Museum

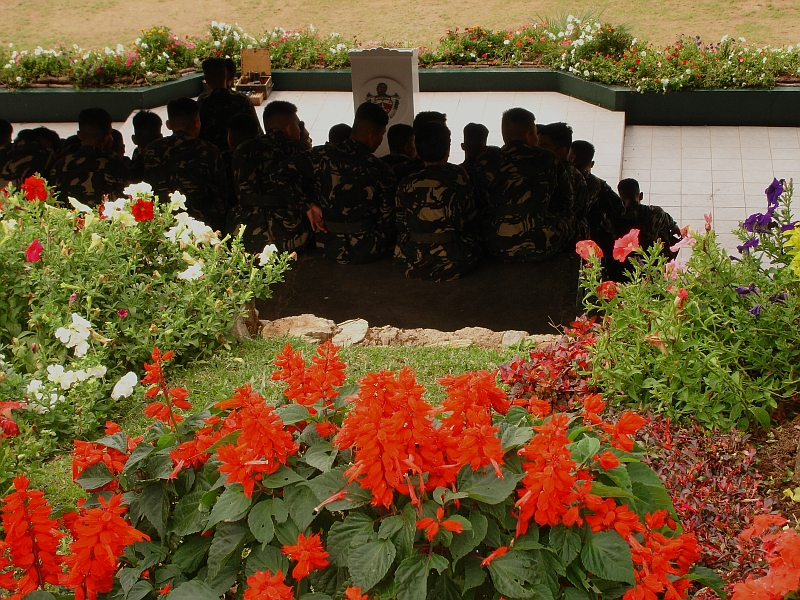
Flowers on the grounds of the PMA campus

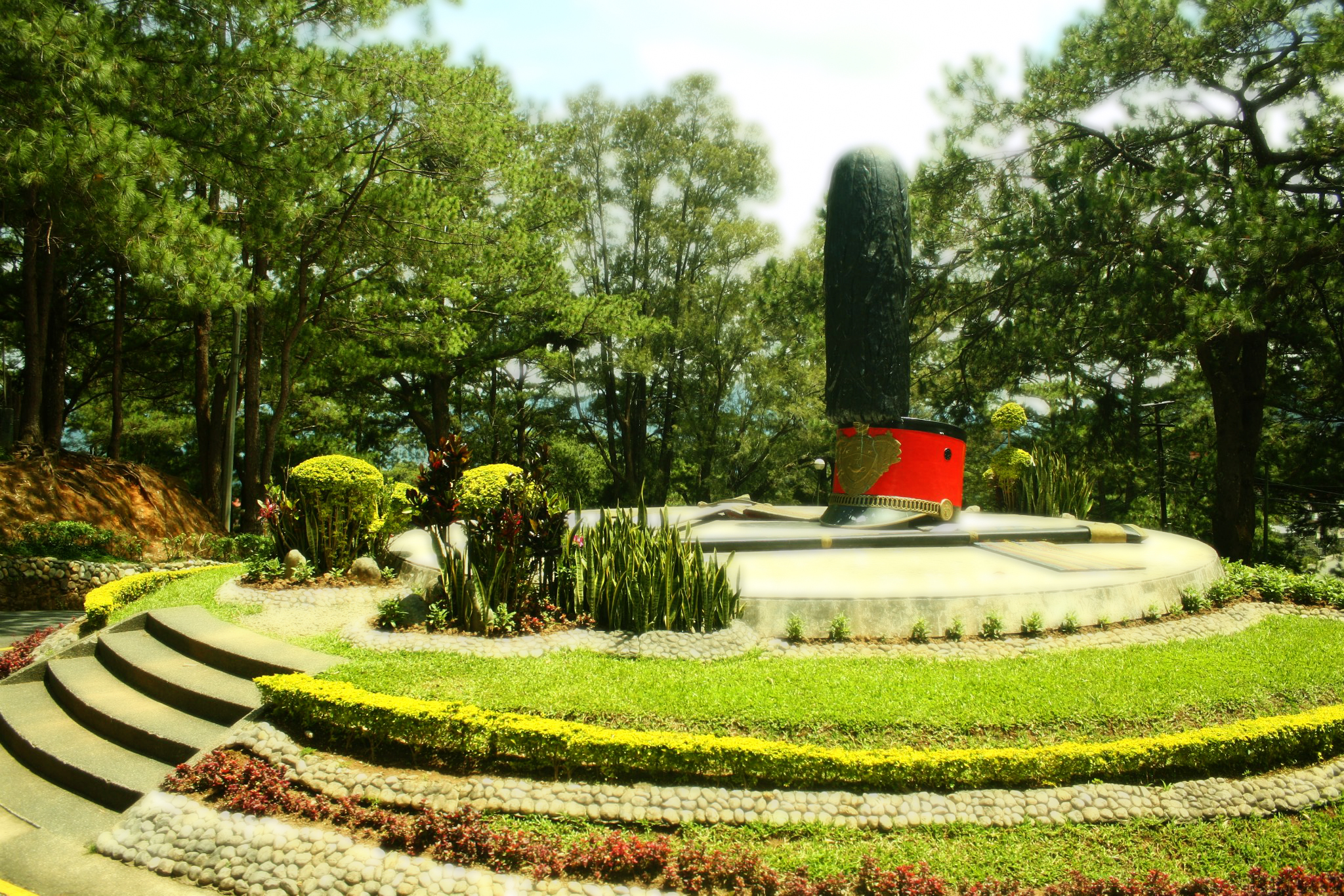
Shako, PMA's Landmark

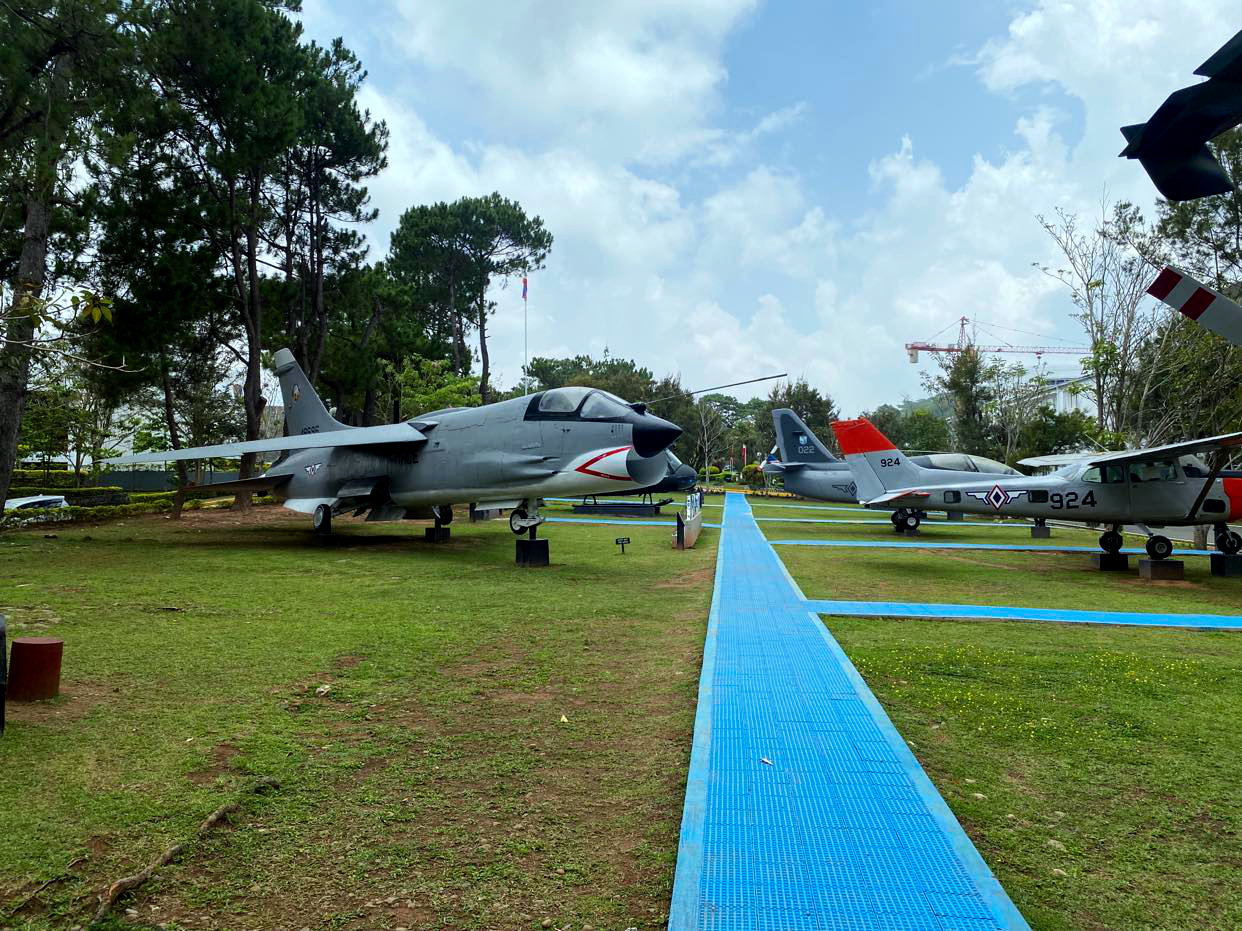
Aircraft on display at PMA's Air Power Park.

== See also ==
- Philippine Merchant Marine Academy
- Philippine National Police Academy
- List of notable Philippine Military Academy alumni
- Cadet rank in the Philippines
- Death of Darwin Dormitorio
- National Defense College of the Philippines
- PMA class of 1986
