= Morong (district) =

Former administrative division of the Philippines

Morong Distrito de Morong (Spanish) San Mateo (1853-1857)
- Former district of the Philippines
- 1853–1901
- Location of the historical district of Morong
- Capital: Morong; Antipolo (1898–1899); Tanay (1899–1900)
- Area
  - 1898: 1,093 km^{2} (422 sq mi)
- Historical era: Colonial period
  - Established: February 23, 1853
  - Disestablished: June 11, 1901
Preceded by	Succeeded by
Tondo; La Laguna	Rizal

Morong was an administrative division of the Philippines that existed as a politico-military district created out of parts of the provinces of Tondo and Laguna on February 23, 1853, as San Mateo, by a decree of the Superior Gobierno, composing Morong, Pililla, Tanay, Baras, Binangonan, Jalajala, Angono and Cardona from La Laguna; and Antipolo, Boso-Boso, Cainta and Taytay from Tondo. The offices were housed at a building now known as the Comandancia. Its first military governor was Francisco Turrentigue.

== History ==
Three years after the issuance of Royal Decree of Spain in 1844, provincial organizations were reclassified into provinces, districts, and politico-military units. At that time, the province of Tondo had religious jurisdiction over Pueblo de Morong and La Laguna over all governmental, commercial, industrial and social affairs. In 1853, the district was created out of such provinces as the Distrito Politico-Militar de los Montes de San Mateo (transl. Politico-Military District of the San Mateo Mountains). In order to debunk the misconception that its capital was the town of San Mateo in the province of Tondo, it was later renamed to Distrito de Morong in 1857, after its capital town of Morong, located at the shore of Laguna de Bay, with villages under the supervision of the Franciscans.

=== Pueblos of Distrito de Morong ===
The following is a list of the pueblos or towns comprising Distrito de Morong.

Pueblo	Year Created	Population (1898)
Morong	1583	9,430
Pililla	1583	2,000
Baras	1595	1,217
Tanay	1606	4,609
Antipolo	1650	3,500
Taytay	1675	6,800
Bosoboso	1700	855
Binangonan	1737	7,624
Cainta	1760	2,275
Angono	1766	1,955
Jalajala	1823	1,735
Cardona	1855	2,641
Teresa	1879	4,250

Morong has served as the district's capital for most of its existence. Antipolo also had served the capital of the district from 1898 to 1899, followed by Tanay from 1899 to 1900.

On February 11, 1879, the creation of the town of Teresa was approved, merging the four former sitios of the town of Morong, namely: Santa Rosa, Prinza, Pantay, and Buhangin.

== Katipuneros in Morong ==
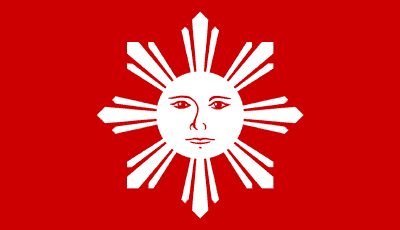
The First Official Philippine Flag

Before the outbreak of the Philippine Revolution, a branch of the Katipunan was created in Morong, the capital of the district. Many leaders of the Katipunan were from Distrito de Morong. Among the first initiates of the Katipunan was Aurelio Tolentino who hailed from Morong. He and his brother Jacinto were Andres Bonifacio's agents. Teodoro Plata, one of original founding members, was a clerk in the Court of Justice of the Peace of Morong.

There were a number of attacks made by the Katipuneros and Spaniards who took their stand in the Commandancia and Morong Church and convent. The last stronghold of Spain in Distrito de Morong happened when the Spaniards, holed out in the convent surrendered to the Katipuneros on August 19, 1898.

After the surrender of the Spaniards in Morong, Antipolo became the capital of the revolutionary army, removing the title of Morong as capital of the district.

Distrito de Morong earned the distinction to be represented as one of the eight rays of the sun in the Filipino flag, symbolic of the eight provinces who held uprisings against the Spaniards in 1896 which were Manila, Bulacan, Pampanga, Nueva Ecija, Morong, Laguna, Batangas, and Cavite.

== Commander Hilarion Raymundo and the Morong Defenders ==
Major Hilarion Raymundo was the leader of the Morong defenders who fought the Americans during the Philippine–American War. Under his leadership, the Americans were forced to retreat after killing and wounding many of them in February 1900. Many Morongueños were still fighting the Americans even after the surrender of Manila and capture of Emilio Aguinaldo at Palanan, Isabela on March 23, 1901. However, through Don Juan Sumulong, General Miguel Malvar advised the Morongueños to surrender to the American flag.

== Creation of Rizal province ==
To hasten the establishment of the civil government in the Philippines, former United States President William McKinley sent the Second Philippine Commission. It conducted public meetings with the people regarding the reorganization of the provinces. On June 5, 1901, 221 delegates from the Distrito de Morong and a portion of Manila Province had an assembly at Pasig Church. Judge William Howard Taft stated that it was suggested to the commission to unite Manila and Morong.

Hilarión Raymundo and José Tupas, two of the Morong delegates, argued against the union of Manila and Morong while José Oliveros and Juan Sumulong, delegates of Antipolo, were in favor of it.

After the deliberation, Trinidad Pardo de Tavera suggested that the merged provinces be named Rizal "...in memory of the most illustrious Filipino and the most illustrious Tagalog the islands had ever known...", referring to José Rizal.
