= Frisco San Juan Sr. =

Filipino politician and military officer

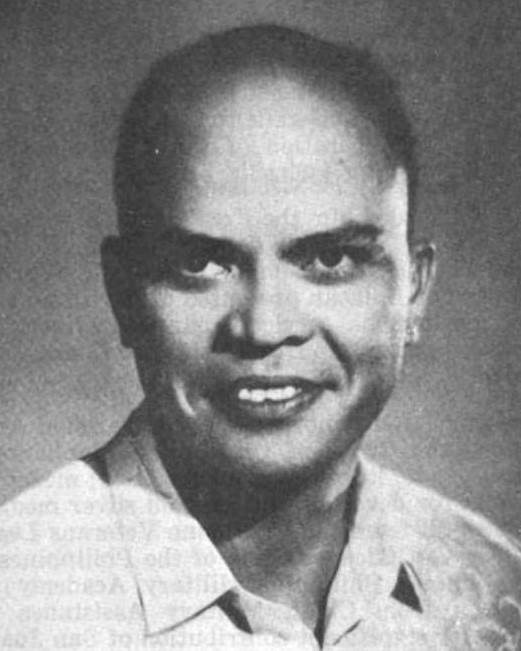
- Official portrait, 1966

Member of the Philippine House of Representatives from Rizal's Second District
- In office December 30, 1965 – September 23, 1972 (Note: President Ferdinand Marcos declared Martial Law in 1972, resulting in the dissolution of Congress.)
- Preceded by: Francisco Sumulong
- Succeeded by: District abolished

Personal details
- Born: Frisco Francisco San Juan; July 21, 1922 Cardona, Rizal, Philippines
- Died: February 18, 2019 (aged 96)
- Party: Nacionalista
- Spouse: Amalia Santos
- Children: 6
- Education: Philippine Military Academy; Mapúa Institute of Technology (BS)
- Occupation: Politician; Civil engineer; Military officer

Frisco Francisco San Juan Sr. (July 21, 1922 – February 18, 2019) was a Filipino politician, civil engineer, and decorated World War II guerrilla leader.

San Juan represented the Second District of Rizal in the Philippine House of Representatives from 1965 until the abolition of Congress in 1972. He was a trusted adviser to President Ramon Magsaysay and served as chairman of the Presidential Complaints and Action Committee (PCAC).

== Biography ==
=== Early life and education ===
San Juan was born on July 21, 1922, in Cardona, Rizal, to Simplicio San Juan, a fisherman, and Juana Francisco. As a boy, he sold peanuts, candies, and worked as a bootblack to help support his family.

He attended Binangonan Elementary School before graduating from Rizal High School in 1939 as one of the top students in his class. He entered the Philippine Military Academy in Baguio, graduating in 1944. After the war, he completed the Infantry Officers' Course at Fort Benning, Georgia, in 1946 and earned a Bachelor of Science degree in civil engineering from Mapúa Institute of Technology in 1949.

=== Military career ===
During World War II and Liberation period, San Juan served in the resistance movement as chief of staff of the Hunters Reserve Officers' Training Corps (ROTC) Guerrillas in 1942 until 1946 with the rank of lieutenant colonel. The Hunters ROTC consisted mainly of Philippine Military Academy and ROTC cadets who organized after being prevented from joining the regular army because of their age.

For his wartime service, San Juan received the Philippine Gold Cross, the Military Merit Medal, the Philippine Defense Medal, and the Philippine Liberation Medal, including recognition for his role in the liberation of Ipo Dam. He also received the United States Presidential Distinguished Unit Badge, the Asiatic Defense Medal, the American Defense Medal, the Southwest Pacific Area Combat Medal, and the World War II Victory Medal. Internationally, he was awarded the Medal of Honor (First Class) by South Vietnam and the Order of the Million Elephants and the White Parasol (Chevalier grade) by the Kingdom of Laos.

=== Political career ===
After the war, San Juan served as executive director of the Rizal Economic Development Commission under Governor Isidro Rodriguez. He promoted economic development programs in the province and initiated the Laguna Lake development project to encourage industrial and agricultural growth in the surrounding area.

In the 1965 elections, San Juan was elected to the Philippine House of Representatives as representative of Rizal's Second District, defeating incumbent Francisco Sumulong by more than 21,000 votes. He served two terms until Congress was dissolved following the declaration of Martial Law in 1972. During his tenure in Congress, San Juan authored and sponsored legislation that became Republic Act No. 4850, which created the Laguna Lake Development Authority (LLDA) to oversee the preservation and development of Laguna de Bay.

Outside Congress, San Juan served as National Commander of the Philippine Veterans Legion from 1954 to 1957. He was also Assistant Commandant and associate professor in the Department of Military Science and Tactics at the University of the Philippines in 1947. From 1960 to 1963, he served on the Board of Trustees of the Ramon Magsaysay Award Foundation. He also became president and chairman of Eastern Construction Company, Inc.

== Personal life ==
San Juan married Amalia Santos, a physician and public health specialist from Tanay, Rizal. They had six children: Guia Salvacion, Frisco Jr., Reginaldo, Napoleon, Davina, and Rachel. His son, Frisco San Juan Jr., later served as Vice Governor of Rizal from 2007 to 2016.

== Death ==
San Juan died on February 18, 2019, one day after the birthday of his son Reginaldo. He was 96 years old.

== Bibliography ==
- House of Representatives of the Philippines (1967). Official Directory of the House of Representatives: Hon. Frisco San Juan – The Philippine Congress, 1965–1972. Manila: Bureau of Printing.
- Urera, Viveneio (1966). Philippine Government Elective Officials: Semi-pictorial Directory (2nd ed.). Manila: Urema Publishing Co.
- Ynares, Jun (3 March 2019). "Lolo Frisco: True Rizaleño". Manila Bulletin.
