= Rizal's 2nd congressional district =

Legislative district of the Philippines

- Constituency for the House of Representatives of the Philippines
- Scope of the district within the province

- Location of Rizal within the Philippines
- Province: Rizal
- Region: Calabarzon
- Population: 517,975 (2020)
- Electorate: 297,030 (2022)
- Major settlements: 7 LGUs: Municipalities; Baras; Cardona; Jalajala; Morong; Pililla; Tanay; Teresa
- Area: 474.46 km^{2} (183.19 sq mi)

Current constituency
- Created: 1907
- Representative: Emigdio P. Tanjuatco III
- Political party: NPC
- Congressional bloc: Majority

Rizal's 2nd congressional district is one of the six congressional districts of the Philippines in the province of Rizal. It has been represented in the House of Representatives of the Philippines since 1916 and earlier in the Philippine Assembly from 1907 to 1916. The district consists of the municipalities of Baras, Cardona, Jalajala, Morong, Pililla, Tanay and Teresa. It is currently represented in the 20th Congress by Emigdio P. Tanjuatco III of the Nationalist People's Coalition (NPC).

Prior to its second dissolution in 1972, the district consisted of towns that all currently remain in Rizal, as well as the present-day Metro Manila cities of Pasig (the then-capital of Rizal), Marikina, and Quezon City's eastern part that was previously under both aforementioned cities, Montalban (now Rodriguez), and San Mateo. After the creation of Metro Manila in 1975, the second district then comprised the northern and eastern part of the reduced province of Rizal beginning in 1987. In 2021, the municipalities of Rodriguez and San Mateo, which were part of the 2nd district since its creation, were separated from the district to form the 3rd and 4th districts, respectively, by virtue of Republic Act No. 11533.

== Representation history ==
#	Image	Member	Term of office		Legislature	Party	Electoral history	Constituent LGUs
#	Image	Member	Start	End	Legislature	Party	Electoral history	Constituent LGUs
=== Rizal's 2nd district for the Philippine Assembly ===
District created January 9, 1907.
1		Bartolomé Revilla	October 16, 1907	October 16, 1909	1st	Nacionalista	Elected in 1907.	1907–1909; Antipolo, Binangonan, Jalajala, Marikina, Morong, Pasig, Pililla, San Mateo, Tanay, Taytay
2		José Tupas	October 16, 1909	October 16, 1912	2nd	Progresista	Elected in 1909.	1909–1915; Antipolo, Binangonan, Jalajala, Marikina, Montalban, Morong, Pasig, Pililla, San Mateo, Tanay, Taytay
3		Sixto de los Angeles	October 16, 1912	July 12, 1915	3rd	Nacionalista	Elected in 1912. Resigned on appointment as Public Welfare Board member.	1909–1915; Antipolo, Binangonan, Jalajala, Marikina, Montalban, Morong, Pasig, Pililla, San Mateo, Tanay, Taytay
4		Leandro A. Jabson	July 12, 1915	October 16, 1916	3rd	Nacionalista	Elected in 1915 to finish de los Ángeles's term.	1915–1916; Antipolo, Binangonan, Cainta, Cardona, Jalajala, Marikina, Montalban, Morong, Pasig, Pililla, San Mateo, Tanay, Taytay
=== Rizal's 2nd district for the House of Representatives of the Philippine Islands ===
5		Eugenio Santos	October 16, 1916	June 3, 1919	4th	Progresista	Elected in 1916.	1916–1919; Antipolo, Binangonan, Cainta, Cardona, Jalajala, Marikina, Montalban, Morong, Pasig, Pililla, San Mateo, Tanay, Taytay
6		Mariano Melendres	June 3, 1919	June 2, 1925	5th	Demócrata	Elected in 1919.	1919–1922; Antipolo, Binangonan, Cainta, Cardona, Jalajala, Marikina, Montalban, Morong, Pasig, Pililla, San Mateo, Tanay, Taytay, Teresa
6		Mariano Melendres	June 3, 1919	June 2, 1925	6th	Demócrata	Re-elected in 1922.	1922–1935; Antipolo, Baras, Binangonan, Cainta, Cardona, Jalajala, Marikina, Montalban, Morong, Pasig, Pililla, San Mateo, Tanay, Taytay, Teresa
7		Eulogio Rodriguez	June 2, 1925	June 5, 1928	7th	Demócrata	Elected in 1925.	1922–1935; Antipolo, Baras, Binangonan, Cainta, Cardona, Jalajala, Marikina, Montalban, Morong, Pasig, Pililla, San Mateo, Tanay, Taytay, Teresa
8		Luís Santiago	June 5, 1928	June 2, 1931	8th	Nacionalista; Consolidado	Elected in 1928.	1922–1935; Antipolo, Baras, Binangonan, Cainta, Cardona, Jalajala, Marikina, Montalban, Morong, Pasig, Pililla, San Mateo, Tanay, Taytay, Teresa
(7)		Eulogio Rodriguez	June 2, 1931	September 16, 1935	9th	Demócrata	Elected in 1931.	1922–1935; Antipolo, Baras, Binangonan, Cainta, Cardona, Jalajala, Marikina, Montalban, Morong, Pasig, Pililla, San Mateo, Tanay, Taytay, Teresa
(7)		Eulogio Rodriguez	June 2, 1931	September 16, 1935	10th	Nacionalista; Democrático	Re-elected in 1934.	1922–1935; Antipolo, Baras, Binangonan, Cainta, Cardona, Jalajala, Marikina, Montalban, Morong, Pasig, Pililla, San Mateo, Tanay, Taytay, Teresa
#	Image	Member	Term of office		National Assembly	Party	Electoral history	Constituent LGUs
#	Image	Member	Start	End	National Assembly	Party	Electoral history	Constituent LGUs
=== Rizal's 2nd district for the National Assembly (Commonwealth of the Philippines) ===
9		Emilio de la Paz Sr.	September 16, 1935	December 30, 1941	1st	Nacionalista; Democrático	Elected in 1935.	1935–1938; Antipolo, Baras, Binangonan, Cainta, Cardona, Jalajala, Marikina, Montalban, Morong, Pasig, Pililla, San Mateo, Tanay, Taytay, Teresa
9		Emilio de la Paz Sr.	September 16, 1935	December 30, 1941	2nd	Nacionalista	Re-elected in 1938.	1938–1941; Angono, Antipolo, Baras, Binangonan, Cainta, Cardona, Jalajala, Marikina, Montalban, Morong, Pasig, Pililla, San Mateo, Tanay, Taytay, Teresa
District dissolved into the two-seat Rizal's at-large district for the National Assembly (Second Philippine Republic).
#	Image	Member	Term of office		Common wealth Congress	Party	Electoral history	Constituent LGUs
#	Image	Member	Start	End	Common wealth Congress	Party	Electoral history	Constituent LGUs
=== Rizal's 2nd district for the House of Representatives of the Commonwealth of the Philippines ===
District re-created May 24, 1945.
(9)		Emilio de la Paz Sr.	June 11, 1945	May 25, 1946	1st	Nacionalista	Re-elected in 1941.	1945–1946; Angono, Antipolo, Baras, Binangonan, Cainta, Cardona, east Quezon City, Jalajala, Marikina, Montalban, Morong, Pasig, Pililla, San Mateo, Tanay, Taytay, Teresa
#	Image	Member	Term of office		Congress	Party	Electoral history	Constituent LGUs
#	Image	Member	Start	End	Congress	Party	Electoral history	Constituent LGUs
=== Rizal's 2nd district for the House of Representatives of the Philippines ===
10		Lorenzo Sumulong	May 25, 1946	December 30, 1949	1st	Popular Front	Elected in 1946.	1946–1972; Angono, Antipolo, Baras, Binangonan, Cainta, Cardona, east Quezon City, Jalajala, Marikina, Montalban, Morong, Pasig, Pililla, San Mateo, Tanay, Taytay, Teresa
10		Lorenzo Sumulong	May 25, 1946	December 30, 1949	1st	Liberal	Elected in 1946.	1946–1972; Angono, Antipolo, Baras, Binangonan, Cainta, Cardona, east Quezon City, Jalajala, Marikina, Montalban, Morong, Pasig, Pililla, San Mateo, Tanay, Taytay, Teresa
(9)		Emilio de la Paz Sr.	December 30, 1949	August 30, 1951	2nd	Nacionalista	Elected in 1949. Died.	1946–1972; Angono, Antipolo, Baras, Binangonan, Cainta, Cardona, east Quezon City, Jalajala, Marikina, Montalban, Morong, Pasig, Pililla, San Mateo, Tanay, Taytay, Teresa
11		Isaias R. Salonga	January 28, 1952	December 30, 1953	2nd	Nacionalista	Elected in 1951 to finish de la Paz's term.	1946–1972; Angono, Antipolo, Baras, Binangonan, Cainta, Cardona, east Quezon City, Jalajala, Marikina, Montalban, Morong, Pasig, Pililla, San Mateo, Tanay, Taytay, Teresa
12		Serafín Salvador	December 30, 1953	December 30, 1957	3rd	Democratic	Elected in 1953.	1946–1972; Angono, Antipolo, Baras, Binangonan, Cainta, Cardona, east Quezon City, Jalajala, Marikina, Montalban, Morong, Pasig, Pililla, San Mateo, Tanay, Taytay, Teresa
13		Francisco S. Sumulong Sr.	December 30, 1957	December 30, 1961	4th	Nacionalista	Elected in 1957.	1946–1972; Angono, Antipolo, Baras, Binangonan, Cainta, Cardona, east Quezon City, Jalajala, Marikina, Montalban, Morong, Pasig, Pililla, San Mateo, Tanay, Taytay, Teresa
14		Jovito Salonga	December 30, 1961	December 30, 1965	5th	Liberal	Elected in 1961.	1946–1972; Angono, Antipolo, Baras, Binangonan, Cainta, Cardona, east Quezon City, Jalajala, Marikina, Montalban, Morong, Pasig, Pililla, San Mateo, Tanay, Taytay, Teresa
15		Frisco R. San Juan	December 30, 1965	September 23, 1972	6th	Nacionalista	Elected in 1965.	1946–1972; Angono, Antipolo, Baras, Binangonan, Cainta, Cardona, east Quezon City, Jalajala, Marikina, Montalban, Morong, Pasig, Pililla, San Mateo, Tanay, Taytay, Teresa
15		Frisco R. San Juan	December 30, 1965	September 23, 1972	7th	Nacionalista	Re-elected in 1969. Removed from office after imposition of martial law.	1946–1972; Angono, Antipolo, Baras, Binangonan, Cainta, Cardona, east Quezon City, Jalajala, Marikina, Montalban, Morong, Pasig, Pililla, San Mateo, Tanay, Taytay, Teresa
District dissolved into the nineteen-seat Region IV's at-large district and twenty-seat Region IV-A's at-large district for the Interim Batasang Pambansa, followed by the two-seat Rizal's at-large district, two-seat Pasig–Marikina's at-large district and four-seat Quezon City's at-large district for the Regular Batasang Pambansa.
District re-created February 2, 1987.
16		Emigdio S. Tanjuatco Jr.	June 30, 1987	June 30, 1998	8th	UNIDO	Elected in 1987.	1987–2022; Baras, Cardona, Jalajala, Morong, Pililla, Rodriguez, San Mateo, Tanay, Teresa
16		Emigdio S. Tanjuatco Jr.	June 30, 1987	June 30, 1998	9th	LDP	Re-elected in 1992.	1987–2022; Baras, Cardona, Jalajala, Morong, Pililla, Rodriguez, San Mateo, Tanay, Teresa
16		Emigdio S. Tanjuatco Jr.	June 30, 1987	June 30, 1998	10th	Lakas	Re-elected in 1995.	1987–2022; Baras, Cardona, Jalajala, Morong, Pililla, Rodriguez, San Mateo, Tanay, Teresa
17		Isidro S. Rodriguez Jr.	June 30, 1998	June 30, 2007	11th	LAMMP	Elected in 1998.	1987–2022; Baras, Cardona, Jalajala, Morong, Pililla, Rodriguez, San Mateo, Tanay, Teresa
17		Isidro S. Rodriguez Jr.	June 30, 1998	June 30, 2007	12th	NPC	Re-elected in 2001.	1987–2022; Baras, Cardona, Jalajala, Morong, Pililla, Rodriguez, San Mateo, Tanay, Teresa
17		Isidro S. Rodriguez Jr.	June 30, 1998	June 30, 2007	13th	NPC	Re-elected in 2004.	1987–2022; Baras, Cardona, Jalajala, Morong, Pililla, Rodriguez, San Mateo, Tanay, Teresa
18		Adelina Rodriguez-Zaldarriaga	June 30, 2007	June 30, 2010	14th	NPC	Elected in 2007.	1987–2022; Baras, Cardona, Jalajala, Morong, Pililla, Rodriguez, San Mateo, Tanay, Teresa
(17)		Isidro S. Rodriguez Jr.	June 30, 2010	June 30, 2019	15th	NPC	Elected in 2010.	1987–2022; Baras, Cardona, Jalajala, Morong, Pililla, Rodriguez, San Mateo, Tanay, Teresa
(17)		Isidro S. Rodriguez Jr.	June 30, 2010	June 30, 2019	16th	NPC	Re-elected in 2013.	1987–2022; Baras, Cardona, Jalajala, Morong, Pililla, Rodriguez, San Mateo, Tanay, Teresa
(17)		Isidro S. Rodriguez Jr.	June 30, 2010	June 30, 2019	17th	NPC	Re-elected in 2016.	1987–2022; Baras, Cardona, Jalajala, Morong, Pililla, Rodriguez, San Mateo, Tanay, Teresa
19		Juan Fidel Felipe F. Nograles	June 30, 2019	June 30, 2022	18th	PDP–Laban	Elected in 2019. Redistricted to the 4th district.	1987–2022; Baras, Cardona, Jalajala, Morong, Pililla, Rodriguez, San Mateo, Tanay, Teresa
19		Juan Fidel Felipe F. Nograles	June 30, 2019	June 30, 2022	18th	Lakas	Elected in 2019. Redistricted to the 4th district.	1987–2022; Baras, Cardona, Jalajala, Morong, Pililla, Rodriguez, San Mateo, Tanay, Teresa
20		Dino Tanjuatco	June 30, 2022	Incumbent	19th	Liberal	Elected in 2022.	2022–present Baras, Cardona, Jala-Jala, Morong, Pililla, Tanay, Teresa
20		Dino Tanjuatco	June 30, 2022	Incumbent	20th	NPC	Re-elected in 2025.	2022–present Baras, Cardona, Jala-Jala, Morong, Pililla, Tanay, Teresa

== Election results ==
=== 2025 ===
2025 Philippine House of Representatives elections
Party	Candidate	Votes	%
NPC	Dino Tanjuatco	182,212	85.95
Independent	Boy Mendiola	29,796	14.05
Valid ballots		212,008	88.49
Invalid or blank votes		27,566	11.51
Total votes		239,574	100.00
NPC hold			

=== 2022 ===
2022 Philippine House of Representatives elections
Party	Candidate	Votes	%
Liberal	Emigdio Tanjuatco III	166,361	81.08
PDP–Laban	Omar Mohammad Fajardo	38,816	18.92
Total votes		205,177	100.00
Liberal gain from Lakas			

=== 2019 ===
2019 Philippine House of Representatives elections
Party	Candidate	Votes	%
PDP–Laban	Juan Fidel Felipe Nograles	212,031	58.75
NPC	Ma. Lourdes Rodriguez	138,086	38.26
NUP	Dindo Garciano	10,793	2.99
Total votes		360,910	100.00
PDP–Laban gain from NPC			

=== 2016 ===
2016 Philippine House of Representatives elections
Party	Candidate	Votes	%
NPC	Isidro Rodriguez Jr.	220,209	
Independent	Luisa Ayuson	38,969	
Independent	Omar Mohammad Fajardo	19,792	
Independent	Said Usman	4,372	
Invalid or blank votes		100,827	
Total votes		384,169	
NPC hold			

=== 2013 ===
2013 Philippine House of Representatives elections
Party	Candidate	Votes	%
NPC	Isidro Rodriguez, Jr.	163,416	64.34
Invalid or blank votes		90,591	35.66
Total votes		254,007	100.00
NPC hold			

=== 2010 ===
2010 Philippine House of Representatives elections
Party	Candidate	Votes	%
NPC	Isidro Rodriguez, Jr.	223,575	80.66
Liberal	Alberto Carasco	53,623	19.34
Valid ballots		277,198	86.87
Invalid or blank votes		41,891	13.13
Total votes		319,089	100.00
NPC hold			

== See also ==
- Legislative districts of Rizal
