= Cardona, Rizal =

Municipality in Rizal, Philippines

Cardona
- Municipality
- Municipality of Cardona
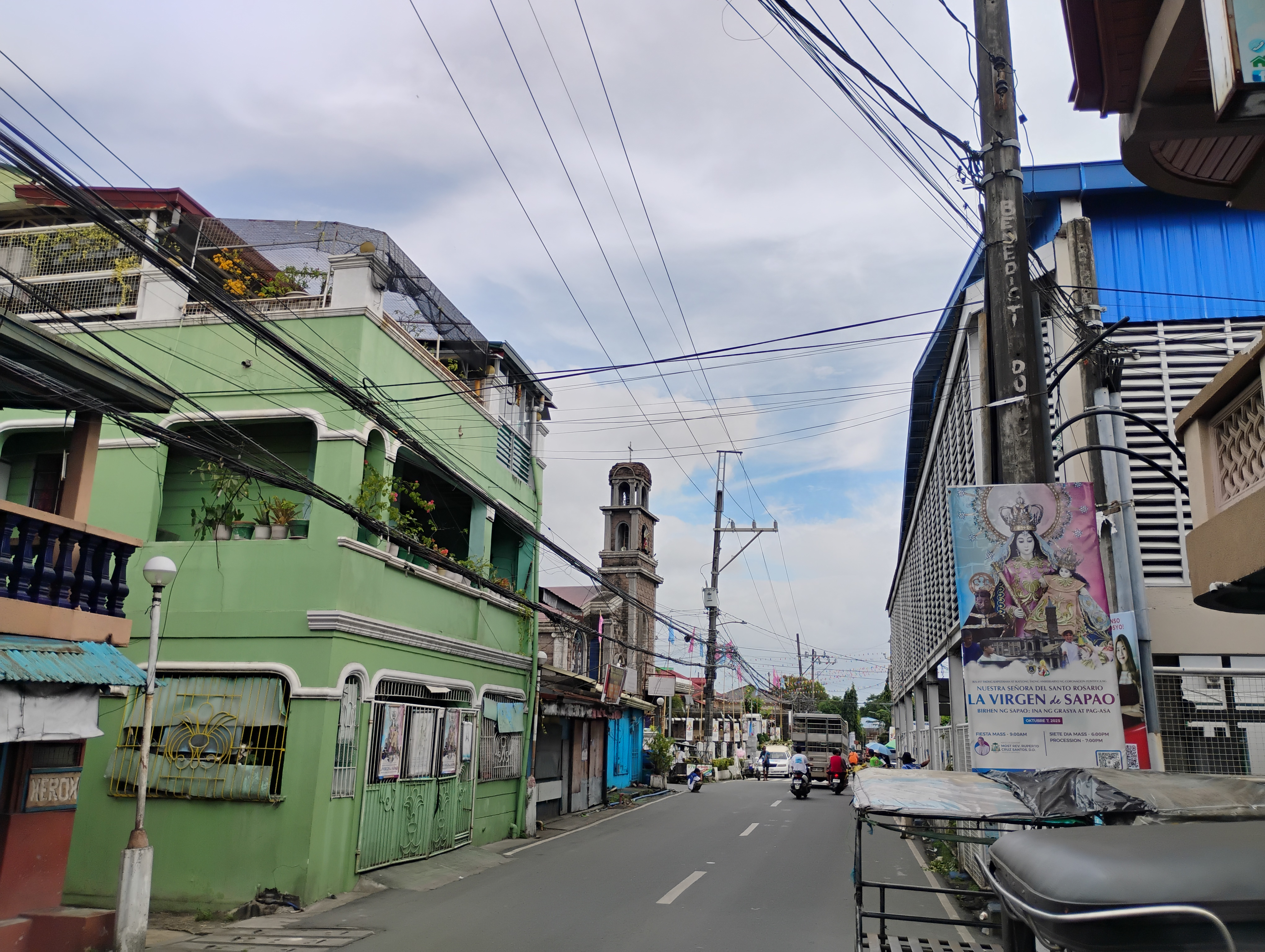
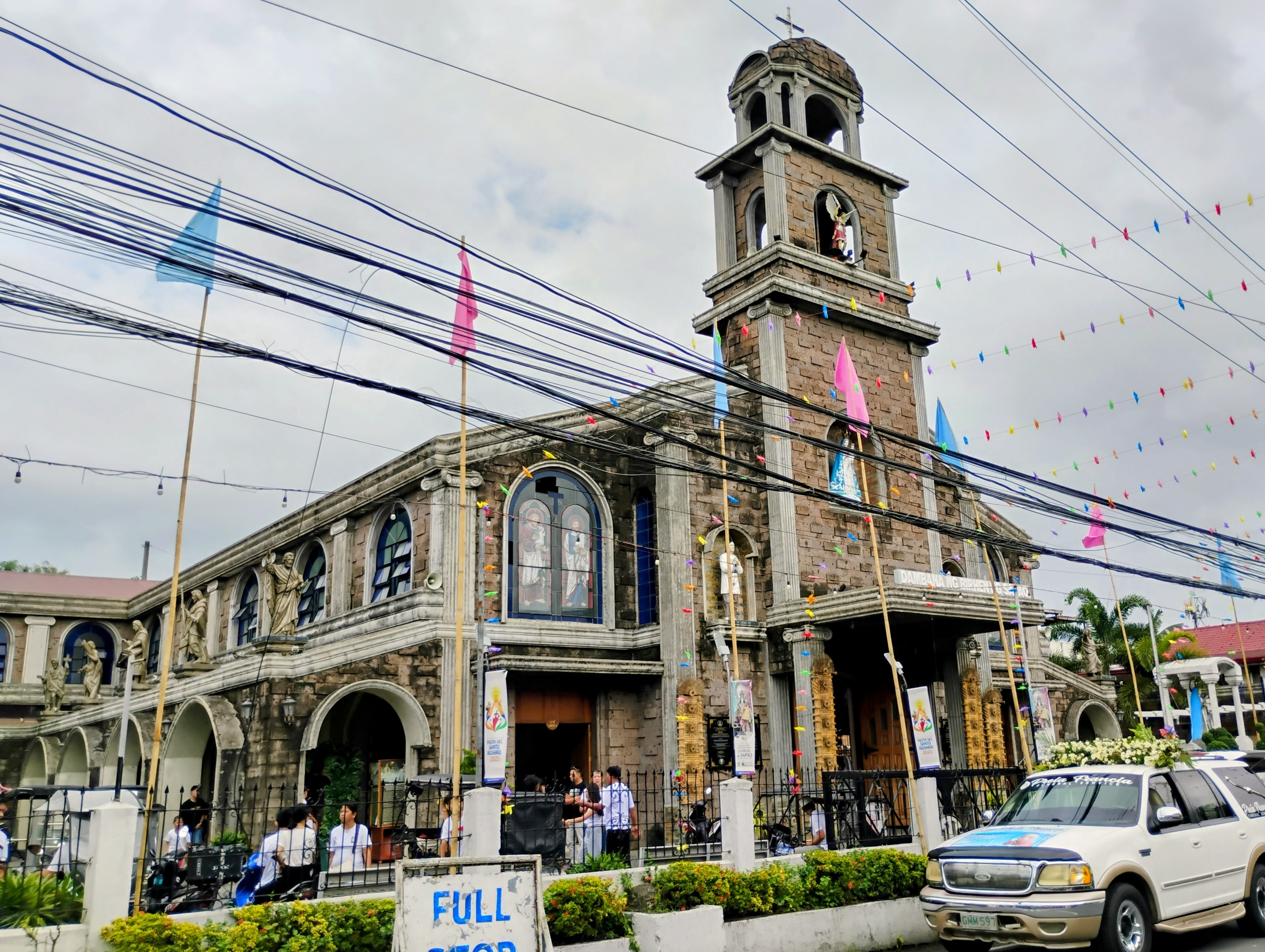
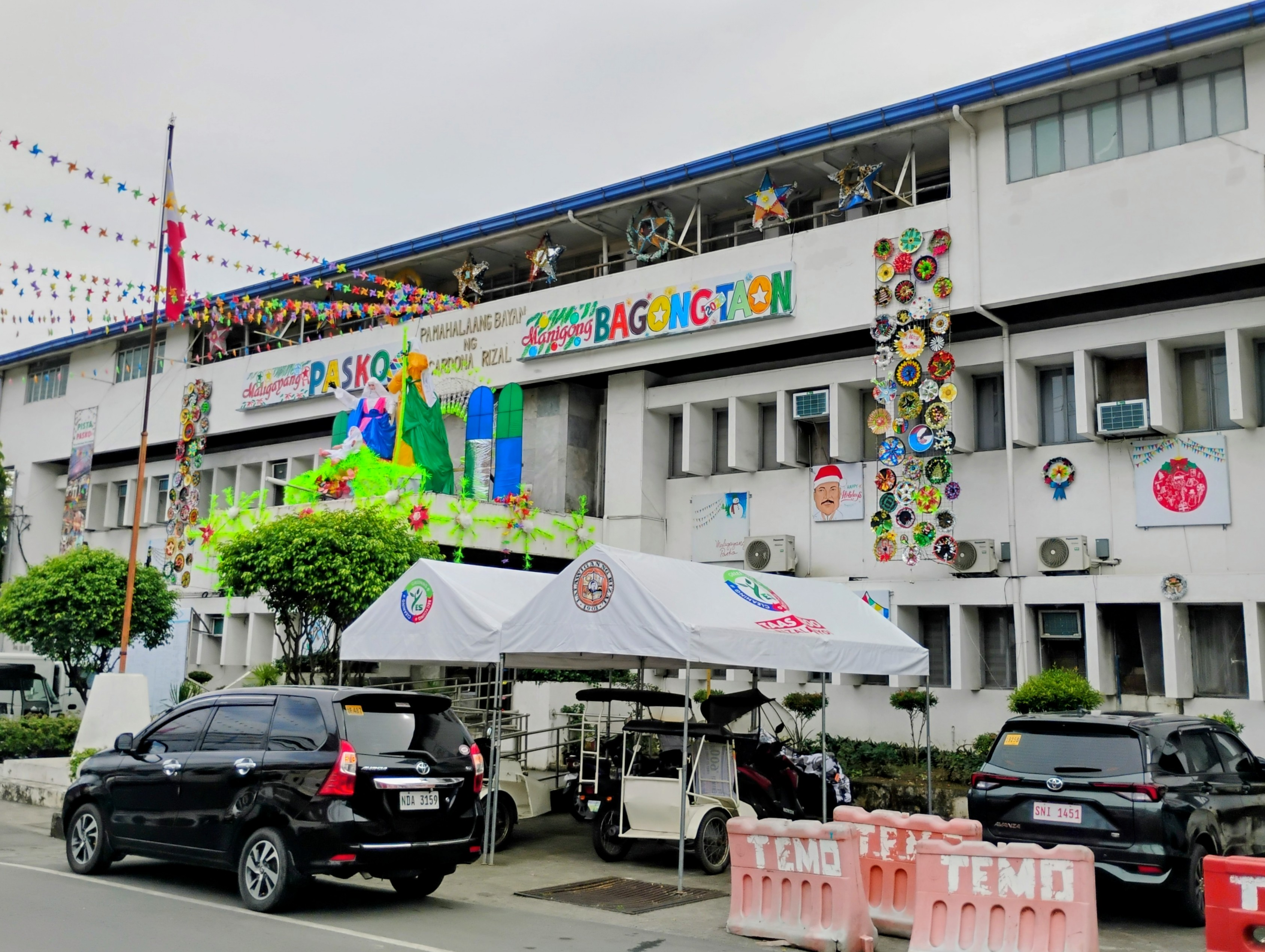
- Cardona Town Proper Diocesan Shrine and Parish of Our Lady of the Holy Rosary Cardona Municipal Hall

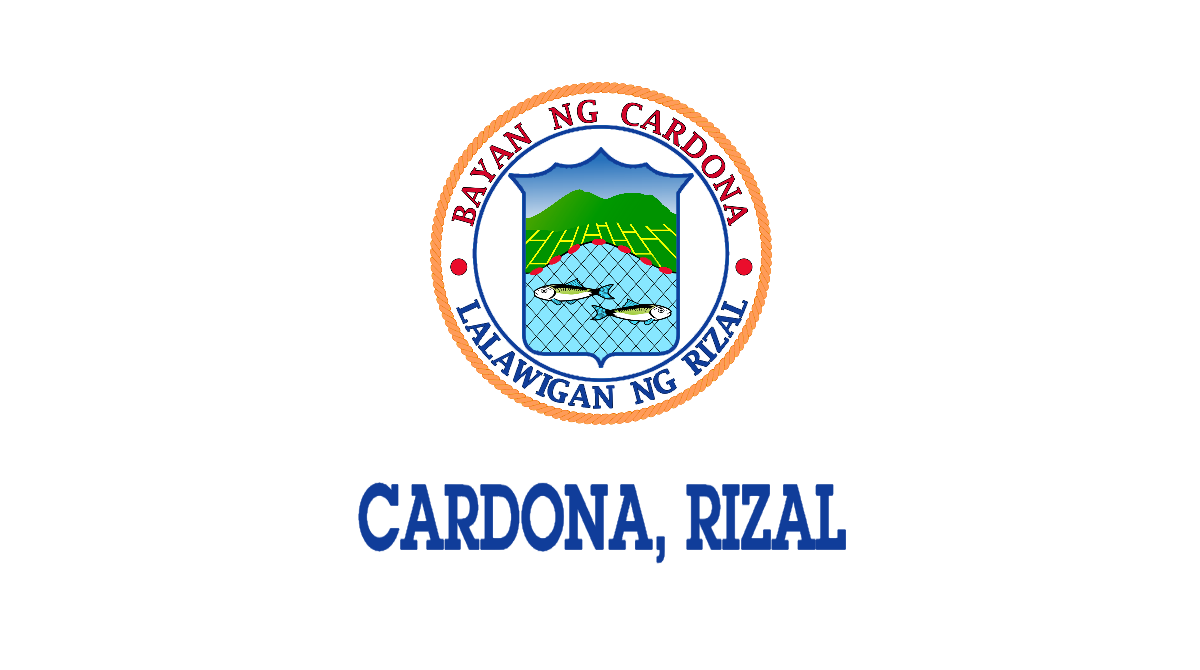
- Flag Seal

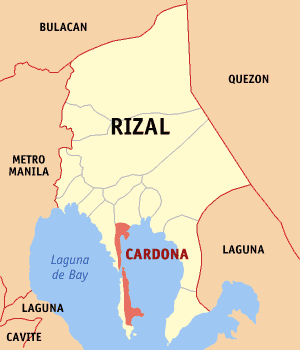
- Map of Rizal with Cardona highlighted
- Interactive map of Cardona
- Location within the Philippines
- Coordinates: 14°29′10″N 121°13′44″E
- Country: Philippines
- Region: Calabarzon
- Province: Rizal
- District: 2nd district
- Founded: 1855
- Annexation to Morong: October 12, 1903
- Chartered: February 1, 1914
- Barangays: 18 (see Barangays)

Government
  - Type: Sangguniang Bayan
  - Mayor: Bernardo P. San Juan Jr.
  - Vice Mayor: Gil F. Pandac
  - Representative: Emigdio P. Tanjuatco III
  - Municipal Council: Members: Thomas P. Anselmo; Romulo B. Campo Jr.; Alejandro A. Dionisio; Paolo C. Reyes; Jarlem O. Rivera; Al Jerrold A. San Jose; Chris John E. Santiago; Nilo B. Subida
  - Electorate: 32,340 voters (2025)

Area
  - Total: 28.56 km^{2} (11.03 sq mi)
- Elevation: 29 m (95 ft)
- Highest elevation: 242 m (794 ft)
- Lowest elevation: 0 m (0 ft)

Population (2024 census)
  - Total: 51,493
  - Density: 1,803/km^{2} (4,670/sq mi)
  - Households: 12,365

Economy
  - Income class: 2nd municipal income class
  - Poverty incidence: 13.32% (2023)
  - Revenue: ₱ 292.1 million (2024)
  - Assets: ₱ 538.7 million (2024)
  - Expenditure: ₱ 273.9 million (2024)
  - Liabilities: ₱ 184.4 million (2024)

Service provider
  - Electricity: Manila Electric Company (Meralco)
- Time zone: UTC+8 (PST)
- ZIP code: 1950
- PSGC: 0405806000
- IDD : area code: +63 (0)2
- Native languages: Tagalog
- Website: www.cardonarizal.gov.ph

Cardona, officially the Municipality of Cardona (Filipino: Bayan ng Cardona), is a municipality in the province of Rizal, Philippines. According to the 2024 census, it has a population of 51,493 people.

== Etymology ==
An oral folklore tells how the name “Cardona” was derived from the Spanish word “caldo” referring to a native rice broth. Supposedly, a stranger walking through the street of the town happened to ask the name of the town from a native, who at that time was enjoying a bowl of hot “caldo”. Thinking that the stranger was inquiring as to what he was eating, the native answered "Sapao! Caldo!"

Another story tells that the town of Cardona in the Province of Barcelona, Spain is believed to be the eponym of the town. Settlements in the area during the Spanish-era were on the hills and the place surrounded by waters of the Laguna Lake. Early missionary Franciscan friars have seen its resemblance to the Spanish town which is also located on a hill and is almost surrounded by the waters of the river Cardener. Parts of the present-day Barangays Calahan, Patunhay, Del Remedio, Iglesia, San Roque, Dalig, and Looc are set on these hills.

== History ==
In 1855, Cardona was created as a town of the District of Morong, with boundaries set in 1857. Later in June 1901, Cardona formed part of the newly created province of Rizal through Act 137 promulgated by the Philippine Commission. In 1903, Act No. 942 annexed the town to the Municipality of Morong. Eleven years then, the Executive Order 108 issued by Governor-General Francis Burton Harrison has established the town as an independent municipality.

=== Philippine independence ===
Cardona native and World War II veteran Frisco F. San Juan, a civil engineer, was elected congressman of Rizal's second district in 1965, and was reelected to a second term in 1969.

== Geography ==
Cardona is part of the 2nd Congressional District of Rizal.

Cardona is 23 kilometers (14 mi) from Antipolo and 40 kilometers (25 mi) from Manila. With the continuous expansion of Metro Manila, the municipality is the easternmost part of Manila's built-up area.

=== Barangays ===
Cardona is politically subdivided into 18 barangays, as indicated below and in the image herein, 11 of which are on the mainland (Calahan, Dalig, Del Remedio, Iglesia, Looc, Nagsulo, Patunhay, Real (Poblacion), Sampad, San Roque (Poblacion), and Ticulio) and 7 on Talim Island (Balibago, Boor, Lambac, Malanggam-Calubacan, Navotas, Subay, and Tuna). Each barangay consists of puroks and some have sitios.

Barangay	Population (2024)	Area
Balibago	1,792	
Boor	1,341	
Calahan	5,963	
Dalig	6,955	
Del Remedio	2,125	
Iglesia	1,921	
Lambac	1,789	
Looc	10,433	
Malanggam-Calubacan	497	
Nagsulo	387	
Navotas	3,375	
Patunhay	2,098	
Real	337	
Sampad	2,358	
San Roque	3,071	
Subay	4,080	
Ticulio	2,269	
Tuna	702	
Total	51,493	

=== Climate ===
Climate data for Cardona, Rizal
Month	Jan	Feb	Mar	Apr	May	Jun	Jul	Aug	Sep	Oct	Nov	Dec	Year
Mean daily maximum °C (°F)	26 (79)	27 (81)	29 (84)	31 (88)	31 (88)	30 (86)	29 (84)	29 (84)	29 (84)	29 (84)	28 (82)	26 (79)	29 (84)
Mean daily minimum °C (°F)	22 (72)	22 (72)	22 (72)	23 (73)	24 (75)	25 (77)	24 (75)	24 (75)	24 (75)	24 (75)	24 (75)	23 (73)	23 (74)
Average precipitation mm (inches)	58 (2.3)	41 (1.6)	32 (1.3)	29 (1.1)	91 (3.6)	143 (5.6)	181 (7.1)	162 (6.4)	172 (6.8)	164 (6.5)	113 (4.4)	121 (4.8)	1,307 (51.5)
Average rainy days	13.4	9.3	9.1	9.8	19.1	22.9	26.6	24.9	25.0	21.4	16.5	16.5	214.5
Source: Meteoblue (Use with caution: this is modeled/calculated data, not measured locally.)

== Demographics ==
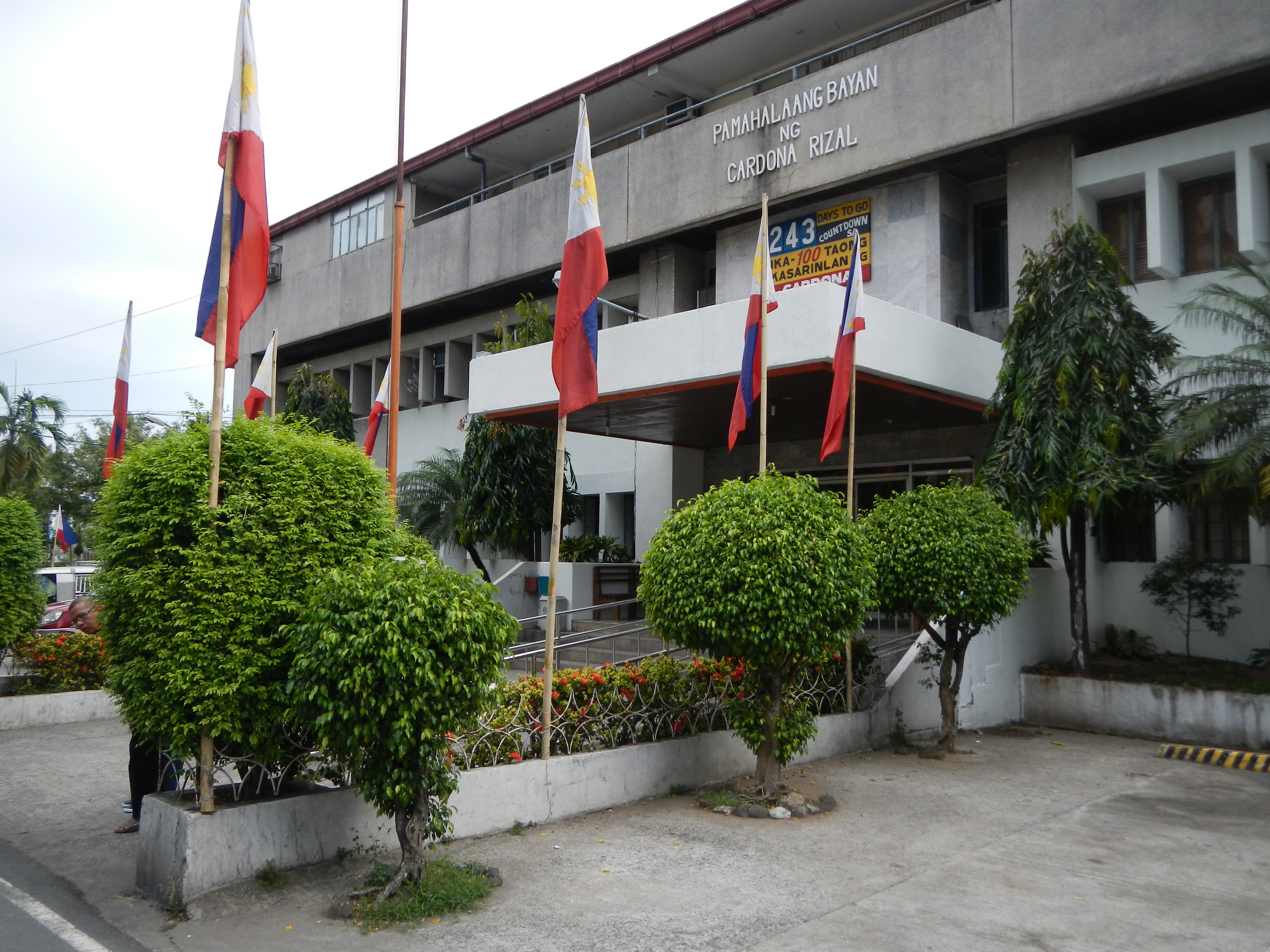
Cardona Town Hall

In the 2024 census, the population of Cardona was 51,493 people, with a density of 1,800 inhabitants per square kilometer or 4,700 inhabitants per square mile.

Population census of Cardona
Year	Pop.	±% p.a.
1903	2,580	—
1918	3,278	+1.61%
1939	6,366	+3.21%
1948	8,134	+2.76%
1960	12,476	+3.63%
1970	16,880	+3.07%
1975	21,266	+4.74%
1980	24,503	+2.87%
1990	32,962	+3.01%
1995	35,501	+1.40%
2000	39,003	+2.04%
2007	44,942	+1.97%
2010	47,414	+1.97%
2015	49,034	+0.64%
2020	50,143	+0.47%
2024	51,493	+0.64%
Source: Philippine Statistics Authority

=== Religion ===
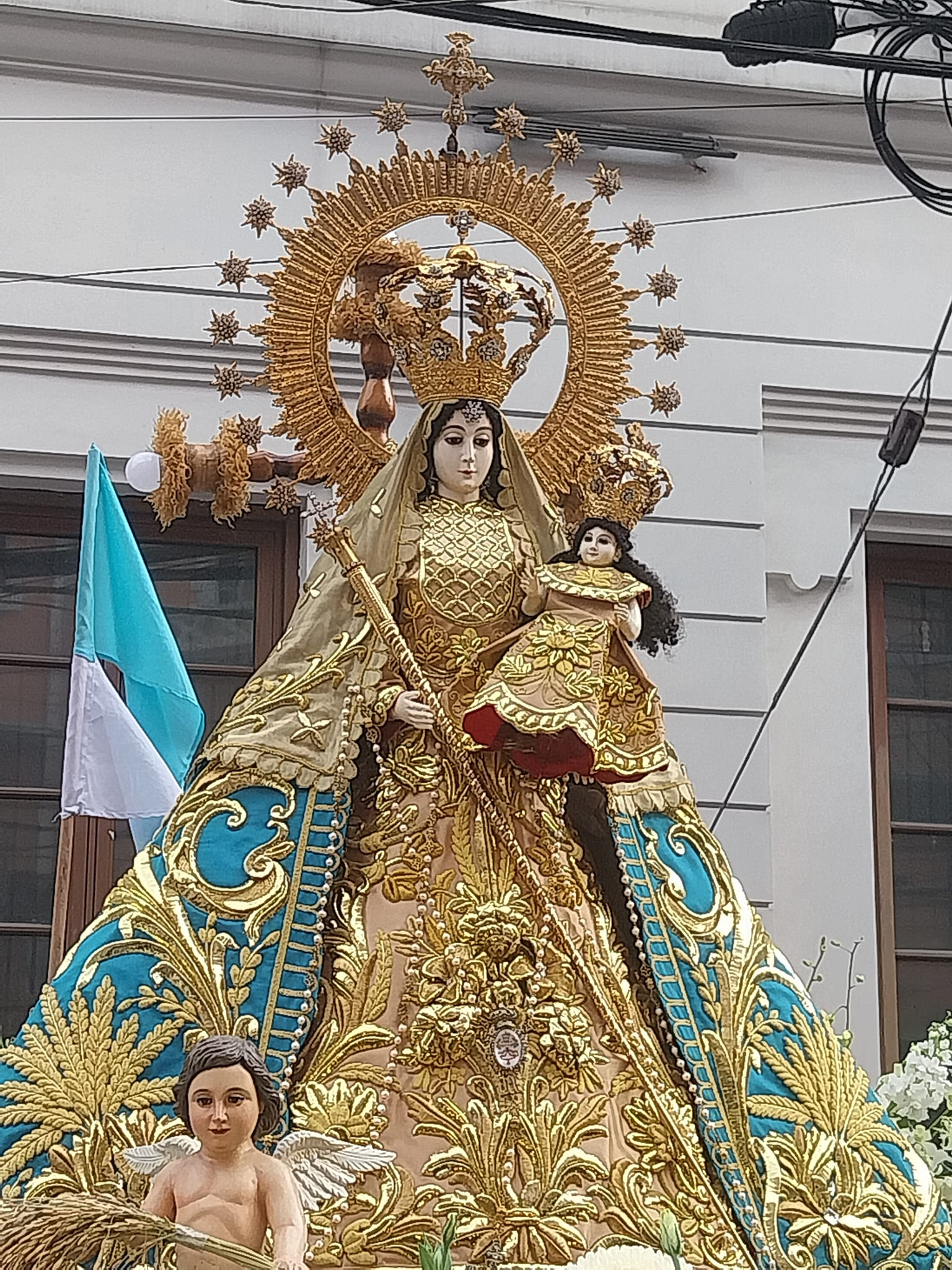
The image of Nuestra Señora de Santo Rosario - La Virgen de Sapao, who is the patroness of the town. This image was pontifically crowned on 7 October 2022, during the pontificate of Pope Francis.

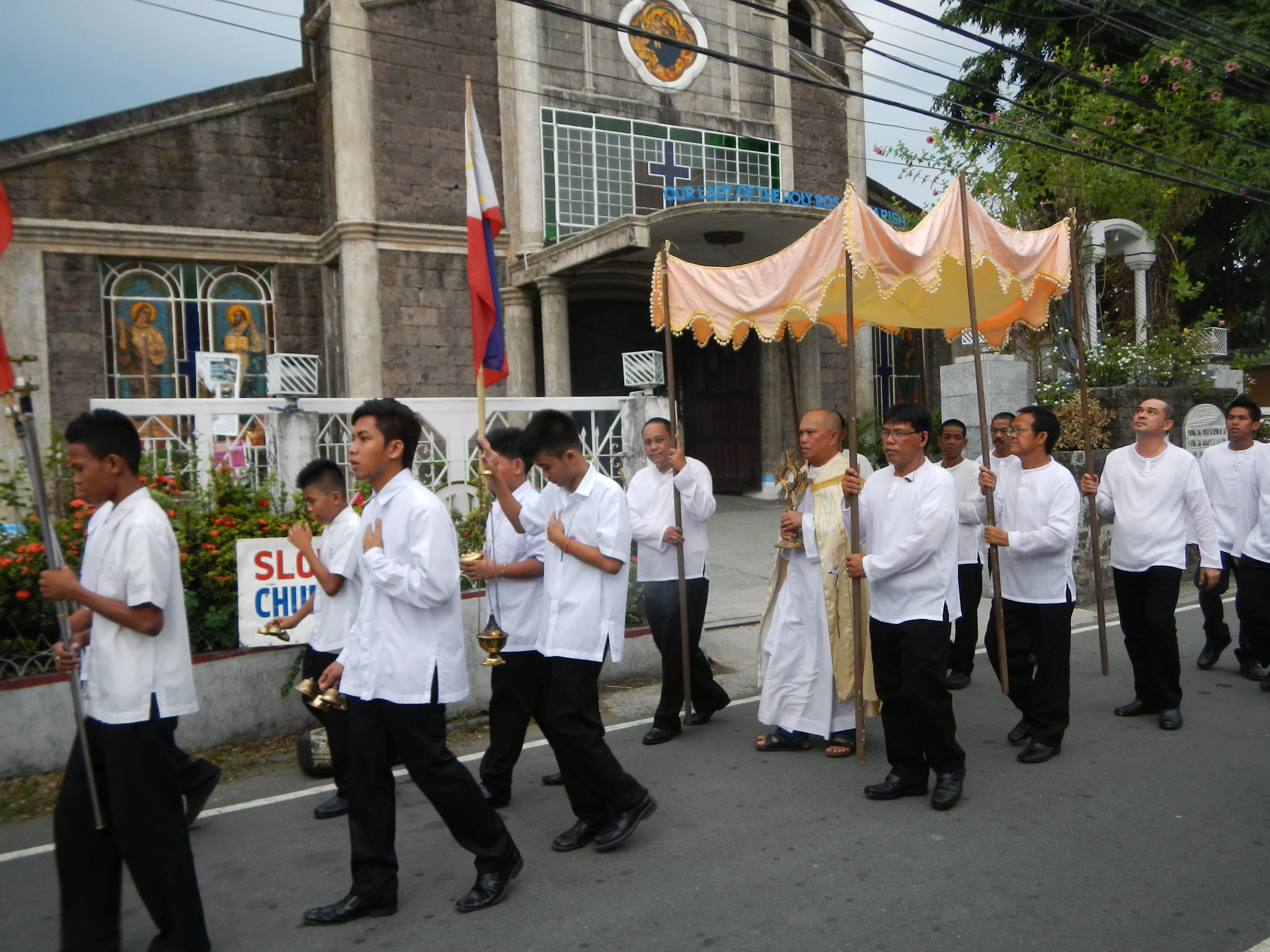
Procession as part of the Feast of Corpus Christi

Christianity is the major religion in the town, and the majority of all Christian denomination is Catholicism where 82% of its inhabitants are baptized Roman Catholics. The town has a minority of UNACAED members, Iglesia ni Cristo, Born Again sects, and more. The town is also the home of the famed and miraculous image of Nuestra Señora del Santísimo Rosario — La Virgen de Sapao, which was granted the honor of pontifical coronation by Pope Francis, through his representative Cardinal José Fuerte Advíncula, the Archbishop of Manila, on 7 October 2022.

==== Catholic churches ====
- Diocesan Shrine and Parish of Our Lady of the Holy Rosary
- Our Lady of Lourdes Parish

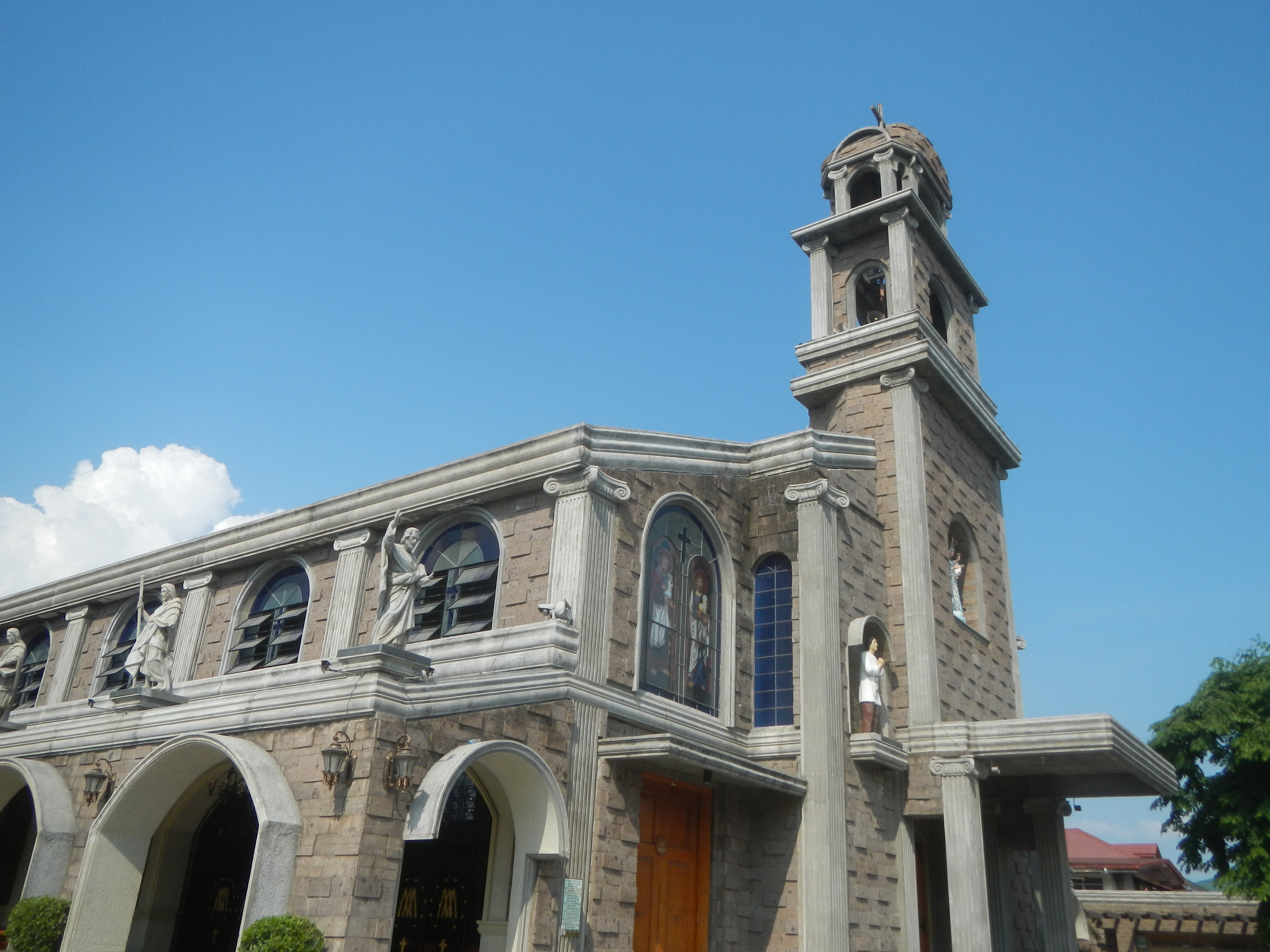
Façade of the Diocesan Shrine and Parish of Our Lady of the Holy Rosary

==== Protestant denominations ====
- Cardona Bethel United Methodist Church
- Cardona Church of Christ
- Cardona Christian Church
- Dae Heung Presbyterian Church
- United Christian Baptist Church
- Cardona Baptist Church

==== Religious sects ====
- Different Born Again sects
- Iglesia Ni Cristo
- Jesus is Lord
- Members Church of God International - Ang Dating Daan
- Unión de Adoradores Cristianos Al Espiritu Divino Inc. (UNACAED)
- Samahan ng Mananampalataya sa Espiritu ng Kadiyosan - Tres Picos

== Economy ==
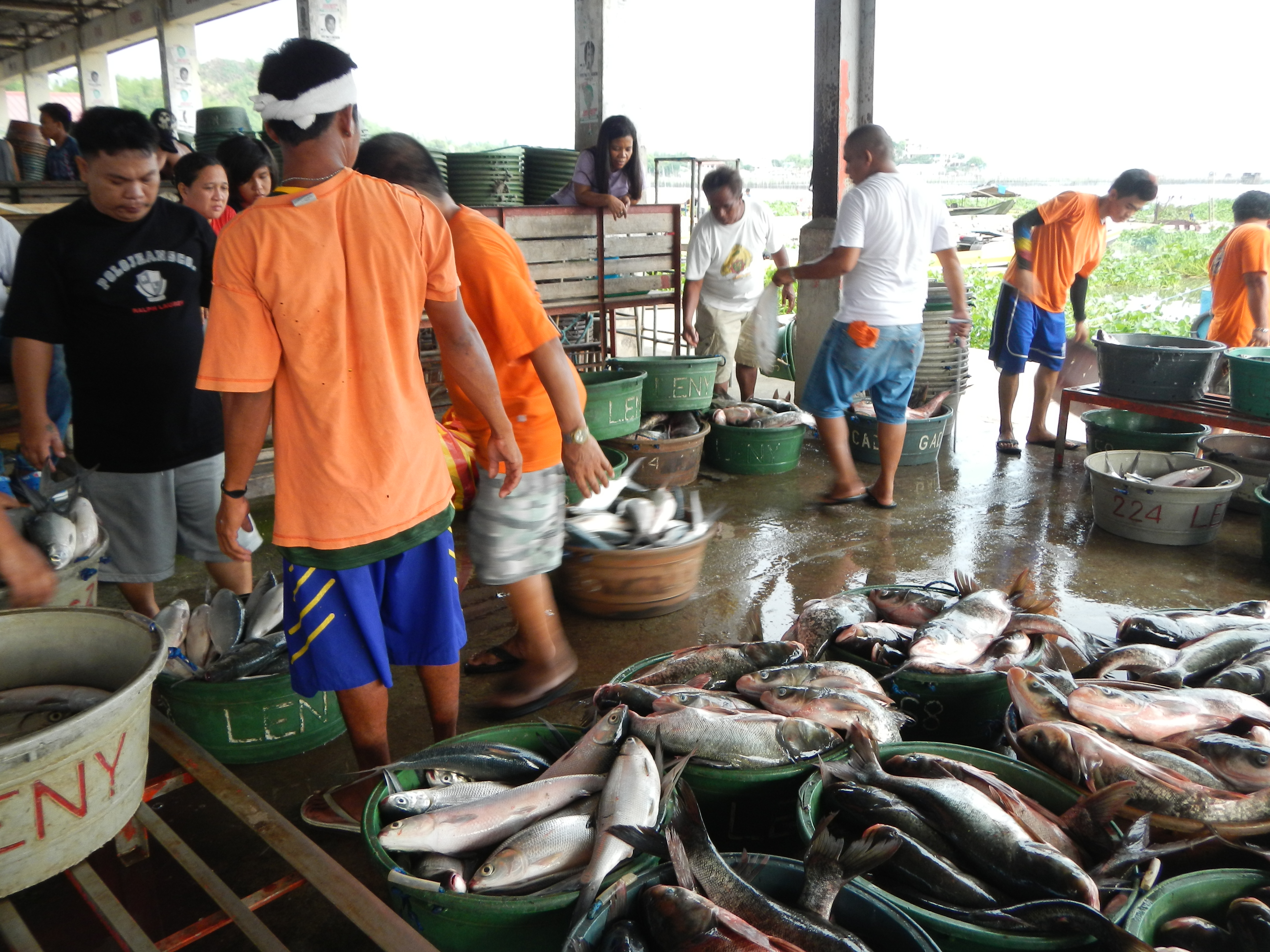
Fishing industry in Cardona where the town is known

Poverty incidence of Cardona (%)

Source: Philippine Statistics Authority

== Education ==
The Cardona Schools District Office governs all educational institutions within the municipality. It oversees the management and operations of all private and public, from primary to secondary schools.

=== Primary and elementary schools ===
- Boor Elementary School
- Castle for Achievers Learning School
- CJ Learning Center
- Dalig Elementary School
- Looc Elementary School
- Mariano C. San Juan Elementary School
- Mother Most Chaste School
- MV Montessori School
- Queen Mary Help of Christians Educational Center
- Patunhay-Calahan Elementary School
- San Francisco Parish School
- Tadlak Elementary School
- Talim Island Academy Foundation
- Tuna-Balibago Elementary School

=== Secondary schools ===
- Bernardo F. San Juan National High School
- Cardona Senior High School
- Catalino D. Salazar National High School
- Tuna-Balibago National High School
- San Francisco Parish School
- Queen Mary Help of Christians Educational Center

=== Higher educational institutions ===
- University of Rizal System ⎯ Cardona Campus

== Healthcare ==
=== Public health services ===
- Rural Health Unit (RHU) - Health services are offered at the municipal facility, and health services centers in individual barangays. Cardona RHU is headed by Dra. Eloida Silao M.D.

=== Private hospitals ===
- Queen Mary Help of Christians Hospital (Calahan)
- Carlos Medical and Maternity Hospital (Looc)
