= Baras, Rizal =

Municipality in Rizal, Philippines

Baras
- Municipality
- Municipality of Baras
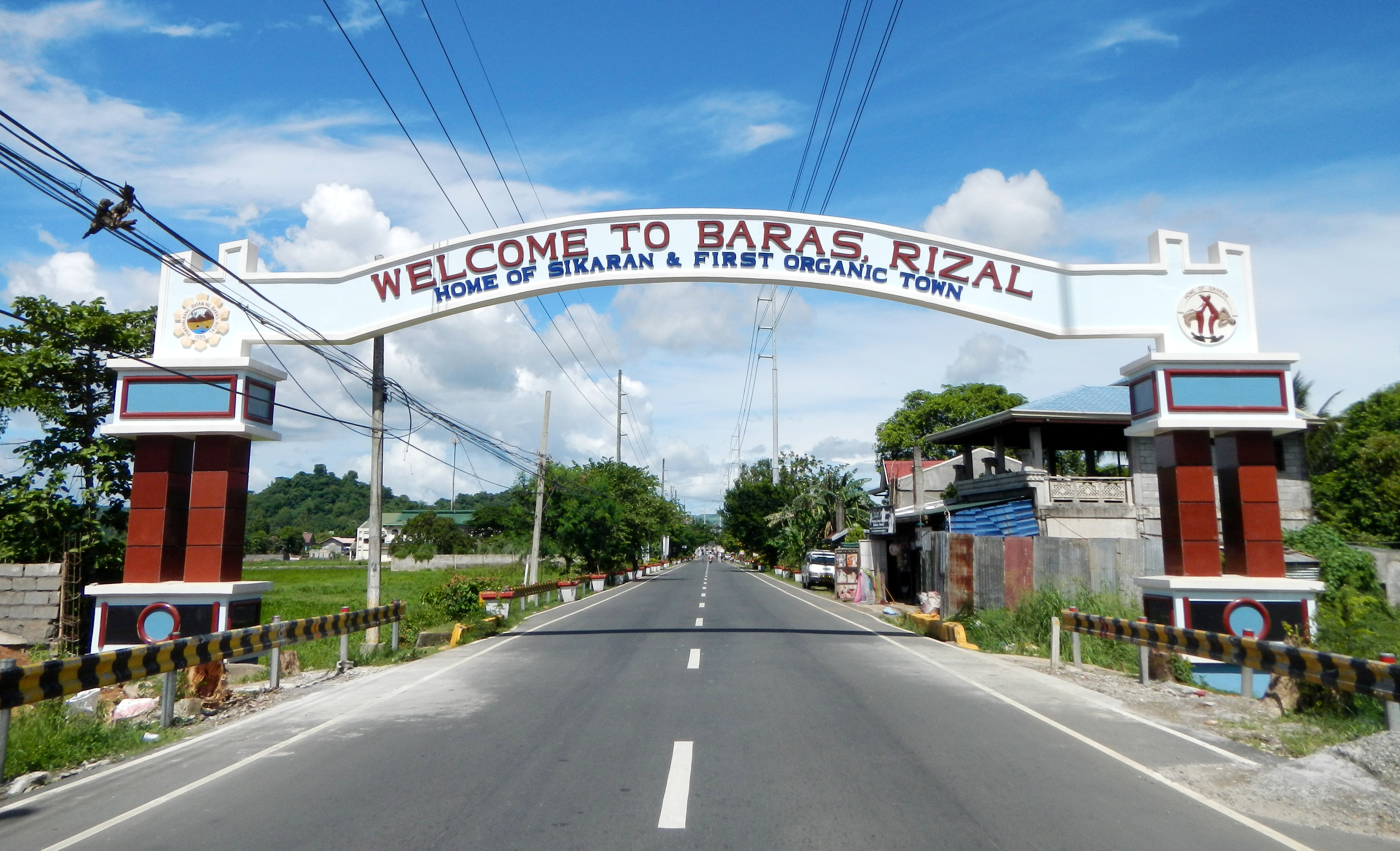
- Welcome arch

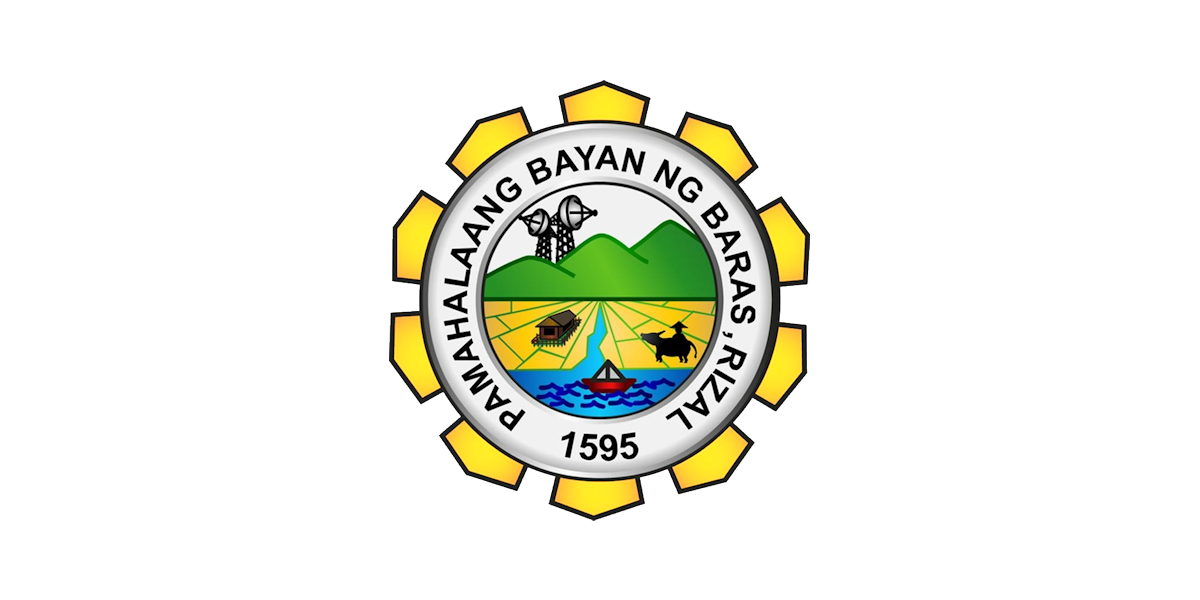
- Flag Seal

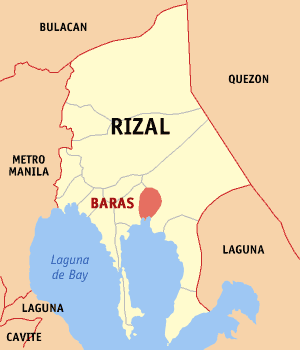
- Map of Rizal with Baras highlighted
- Interactive map of Baras
- Location within the Philippines
- Coordinates: 14°31′N 121°16′E
- Country: Philippines
- Region: Calabarzon
- Province: Rizal
- District: 2nd district
- Founded: 1595
- Annexation to Morong: October 12, 1903
- Annexation to Tanay: January 16, 1906
- Chartered: November 24, 1920
- Barangays: 10 (see Barangays)

Government
  - Type: Sangguniang Bayan
  - Mayor: Wilfredo C. Robles
  - Vice Mayor: Kathrine B. Robles
  - Representative: Emigdio P. Tanjuatco III
  - Municipal Council: Members: Jovita P. Cawicaan; Bien A. Garrovillas; Carlo D. Llagas; Renato M. Llagas; Emmanuel R. Olaño; Hector M. Robles; Peter Leo P. Robles; Vergil F. Robles
  - Electorate: 50,015 voters (2025)

Area
  - Total: 84.93 km^{2} (32.79 sq mi)
- Elevation: 55 m (180 ft)
- Highest elevation: 284 m (932 ft)
- Lowest elevation: 0 m (0 ft)

Population (2024 census)
  - Total: 91,099
  - Density: 1,073/km^{2} (2,778/sq mi)
  - Households: 21,208

Economy
  - Income class: 1st municipal income class
  - Poverty incidence: 14.8% (2023)
  - Revenue: ₱ 337.4 million (2024)
  - Assets: ₱ 661.7 million (2024)
  - Expenditure: ₱ 329.1 million (2024)
  - Liabilities: ₱ 109.2 million (2024)

Service provider
  - Electricity: Manila Electric Company (Meralco)
- Time zone: UTC+8 (PST)
- ZIP code: 1970
- PSGC: 0405803000
- IDD : area code: +63 (0)2
- Native languages: Tagalog
- Website: www.barasrizal.gov.ph

Baras, officially the Municipality of Baras (Tagalog: Bayan ng Baras), is a municipality in the province of Rizal, Philippines. According to the 2024 census, it has a population of 91,099 people.

== History ==
=== Spanish colonial era ===
In 1595, the Franciscan missionaries under the leadership of Fr. Juan de Placencia and Fr. Diego de Oropesa, founded a “visita” for Morong on the present site of Bosoboso, south of Painaan with Apostol Santiago Mayor y Matamoros as its patron saint. It was known as “Visita de Santiago” or Santiago until such time that it became Baras. Baras was then inhabited by 400 Aetas and other mountain people.

In 1636, the town was transferred to a place called Ibayo, 1.5 leagues southeast of the first site due to the hostility of the Aetas and the mountaineers who burned part of the town and church in 1635. The Most Holy Redeemer, commonly known as San Salvador in Spanish became their Patron. However, the town and church of Baras was burned by Chinese rebels in 1639, who were retreating from Manila to the Sierra Madre mountains.

The ecclesiastical administration of Baras returned by the Jesuits to the Franciscans in 1679. In 1682, the town was transferred to its present site where they would not be menaced by marauding tribes of the mountaineers.

Baras was under the jurisdiction of the province of Laguna from 1606 to 1853. Its administration was transferred to the newly created Distrito Politico-Militar de los Montes de San Mateo. This district was renamed to Distrito de Morong in 1857 whose capital was in Antipolo but was later transferred to Morong.

The 1818 Spanish census recorded the area having 466 native families and 3 Spanish-Filipino families.

In July 1895, the representatives of the Katipunan came to inform the people of Morong, Tanay, Antipolo, Baras and Pililla about the cause of the secret society. The Katipunan of Baras established the Real or Military Camp at sitio of Gogo or Pamitinan. On November 21, 1896, the Katipunan attempted to capture the town of Morong but were driven by the Guardia Civil. By 1898, Baras had joined the Revolutionary Government of Emilio Aguinaldo.

After the defeat of the Spaniards in Morong, the Aguinaldo Headquarters ordered the establishment of the municipal township. A special election was held. However, the Revolutionary Government of Aguinaldo did not last because of the outbreak of the Filipino-American War. On March 29, 1900, Military Order No. 40, by Governor General Wesley Merritt came in effect. This order was for the election of an Alcalde Municipal, Vice Alcalde, and the Municipal Council. This was implemented in October of the same year.

=== American colonial era ===
Act No. 942 was passed by the Philippine Commission in 1901, providing the establishment of the province of Rizal to be comprised in part of towns from the former Distrito de Morong. Baras effectively became part of the new province. However, on October 12, 1903, it was annexed to the town of Morong.

On January 16, 1906, Baras was annexed to Tanay by virtue of Act No. 1442. But as Baras was not represented as a barrio of Tanay, and previously under Morong, there was a movement for the separation of Baras as an independent town. Under the leadership of Leopoldo Digma, the clamor was realized through Executive Order No. 57, dated November 24, 1920, establishing the Municipality of Baras.

=== Japanese occupation ===
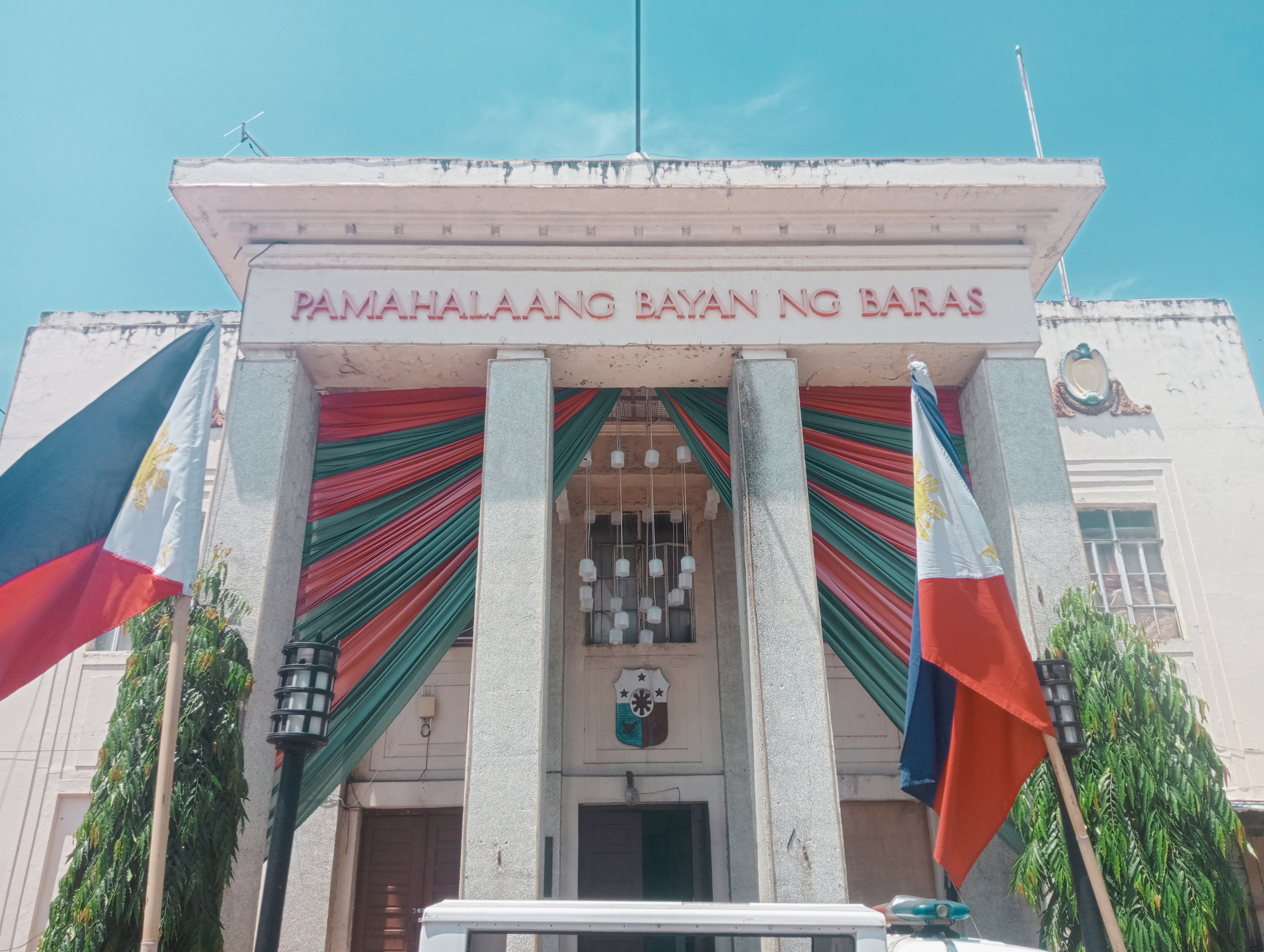
Old Baras Municipal Hall

During the Second World War, the Imperial Japanese armed forces occupied Baras in 1942. The local guerrillas of the General Marking Unit besieged Baras and attacked the Japanese from 1942 to 1945. The Philippine Commonwealth Army and the Philippine Constabulary liberated Baras in 1945. The General Marking Units defeated the Japanese forces at the end of World War II.

The Military General Headquarters and Camp Bases of the 53rd Infantry Division of the Philippine Commonwealth Army was established and active from January 3, 1942, to June 30, 1946, and built Camp Caparas in Baras. The military engagements of the Anti-Japanese Operations in Manila and Southern Luzon aided the local guerrilla resistance fighters and U.S. military forces against the Japanese Imperial forces.

Baras was razed to the ground on March 10, 1945. This signified the liberation of the town but also left many homeless. The rehabilitation of the town began. War damage claims were filed to the amount of ₱300,000 (equivalent to ₱19,403,142 in 2021) to be used for the construction of new houses. Then mayor, Mariano Golla, focused on the improvement of roads and the construction of a public dispensary. Under his term, Baras was elevated to a fourth-class municipality due to an increase in income.

Under the succeeding administrations, improvements of road networks were implemented; seven liberty wells were constructed; the number of schoolhouses were increased; river controls in Barangay San Juan and San Jose were constructed; rehabilitation of the existing government building continued; and a reforestation program was launched.

== Geography ==
Baras is 32 kilometers (20 mi) from Antipolo and 49 kilometers (30 mi) from Manila.

=== Barangays ===
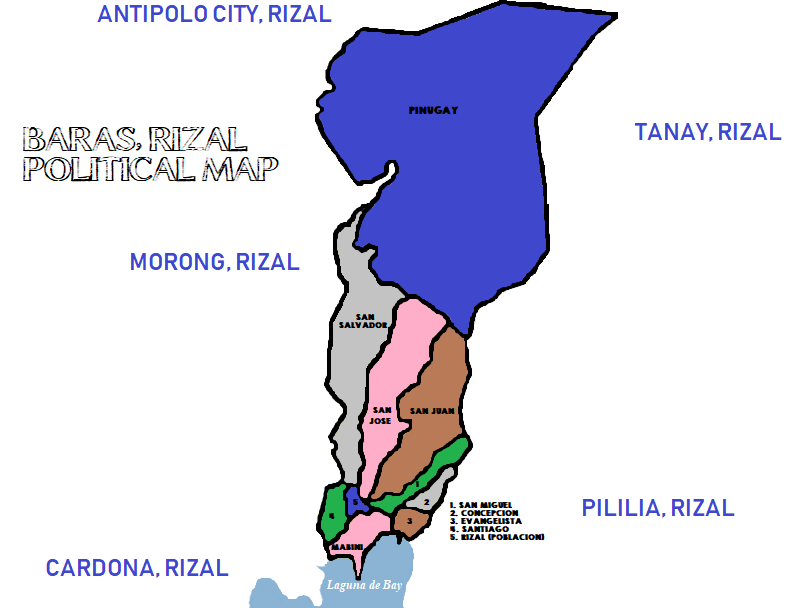
Political subdivisions (Subject for Correction)

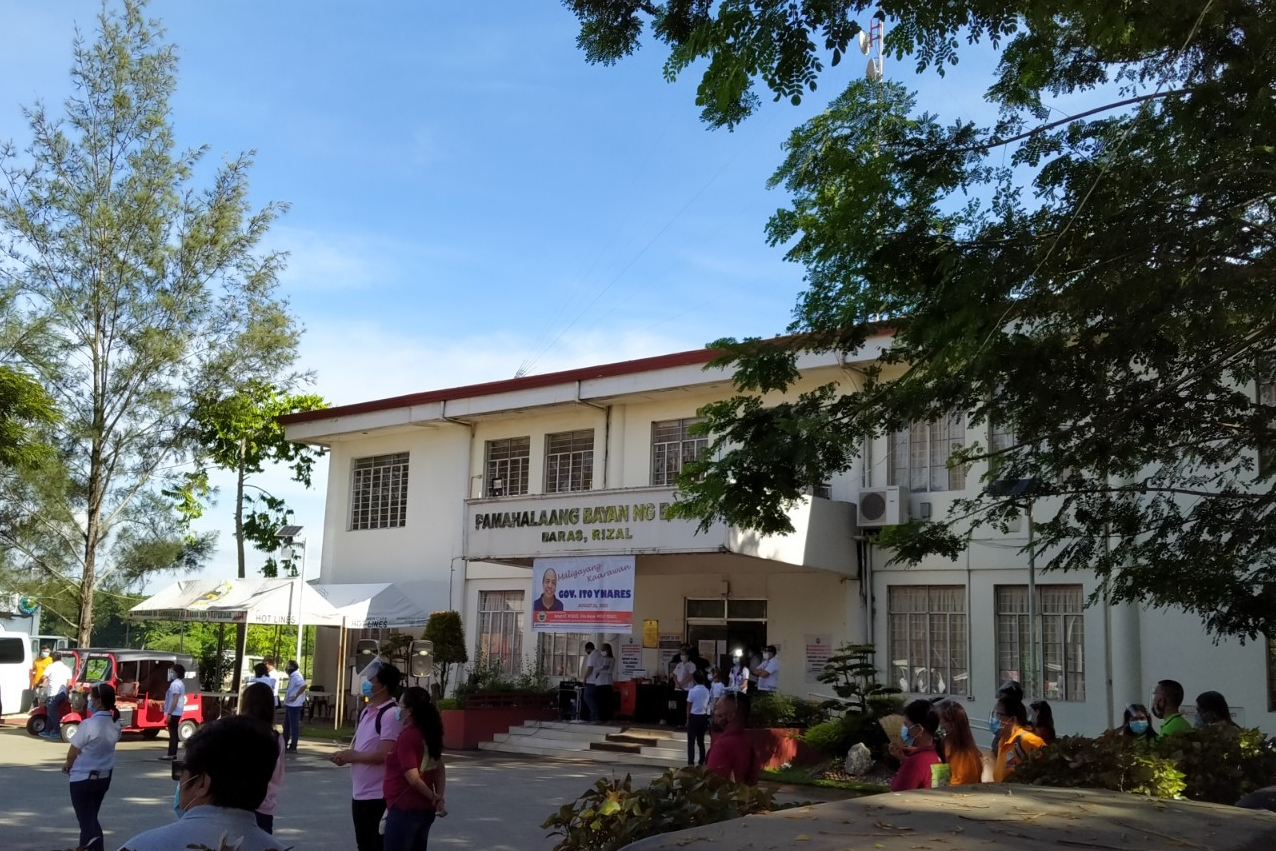
New Baras Municipal Hall

Baras is politically subdivided into 10 barangays, as indicated below. Each barangay consists of puroks and some have sitios.

There is only one urban barangay (highlighted in bold) and the rest of the barangays are classified as rural.

Barangay	Population (2024)	Area
Evangelista	4,249	
**Rizal (Poblacion)**	2,451	
San Jose	5,328	
San Salvador	12,724	
Santiago	4,204	
Concepcion	1,413	
San Juan	4,970	
San Miguel	1,301	
Mabini	2,925	
Pinugay	51,534	
**Total**	**91,099**	

=== Climate ===
Climate data for Baras, Rizal
Month	Jan	Feb	Mar	Apr	May	Jun	Jul	Aug	Sep	Oct	Nov	Dec	Year
Mean daily maximum °C (°F)	26 (79)	27 (81)	28 (82)	31 (88)	31 (88)	30 (86)	29 (84)	29 (84)	29 (84)	29 (84)	28 (82)	27 (81)	29 (84)
Mean daily minimum °C (°F)	22 (72)	22 (72)	22 (72)	23 (73)	25 (77)	25 (77)	25 (77)	25 (77)	24 (75)	24 (75)	23 (73)	22 (72)	24 (74)
Average precipitation mm (inches)	40 (1.6)	33 (1.3)	35 (1.4)	38 (1.5)	138 (5.4)	190 (7.5)	242 (9.5)	216 (8.5)	224 (8.8)	200 (7.9)	114 (4.5)	94 (3.7)	1,564 (61.6)
Average rainy days	12.2	9.0	11.0	11.7	21.5	24.0	27.2	26.1	26.8	22.3	16.3	15.1	223.2
Source: Meteoblue

== Demographics ==
Population census of Baras
Year	Pop.	±% p.a.
1903	1,200	—
1939	2,120	+1.59%
1948	2,745	+2.91%
1960	4,454	+4.12%
1970	7,166	+4.86%
1975	9,722	+6.31%
1980	11,196	+2.86%
1990	16,880	+4.19%
1995	20,060	+3.29%
2000	24,514	+4.39%
2007	31,524	+3.53%
2010	32,609	+1.24%
2015	69,300	+15.44%
2020	87,637	+5.07%
2024	91,099	+0.93%
Source: Philippine Statistics Authority

In the 2024 census, the population of Baras was 91,099 people, with a density of 1,100 inhabitants per square kilometer or 2,800 inhabitants per square mile.

== Economy ==
Poverty incidence of Baras (%)

Source: Philippine Statistics Authority

== Tourism ==
=== Diocesan Shrine and Parish of Saint Joseph (Baras Church) ===
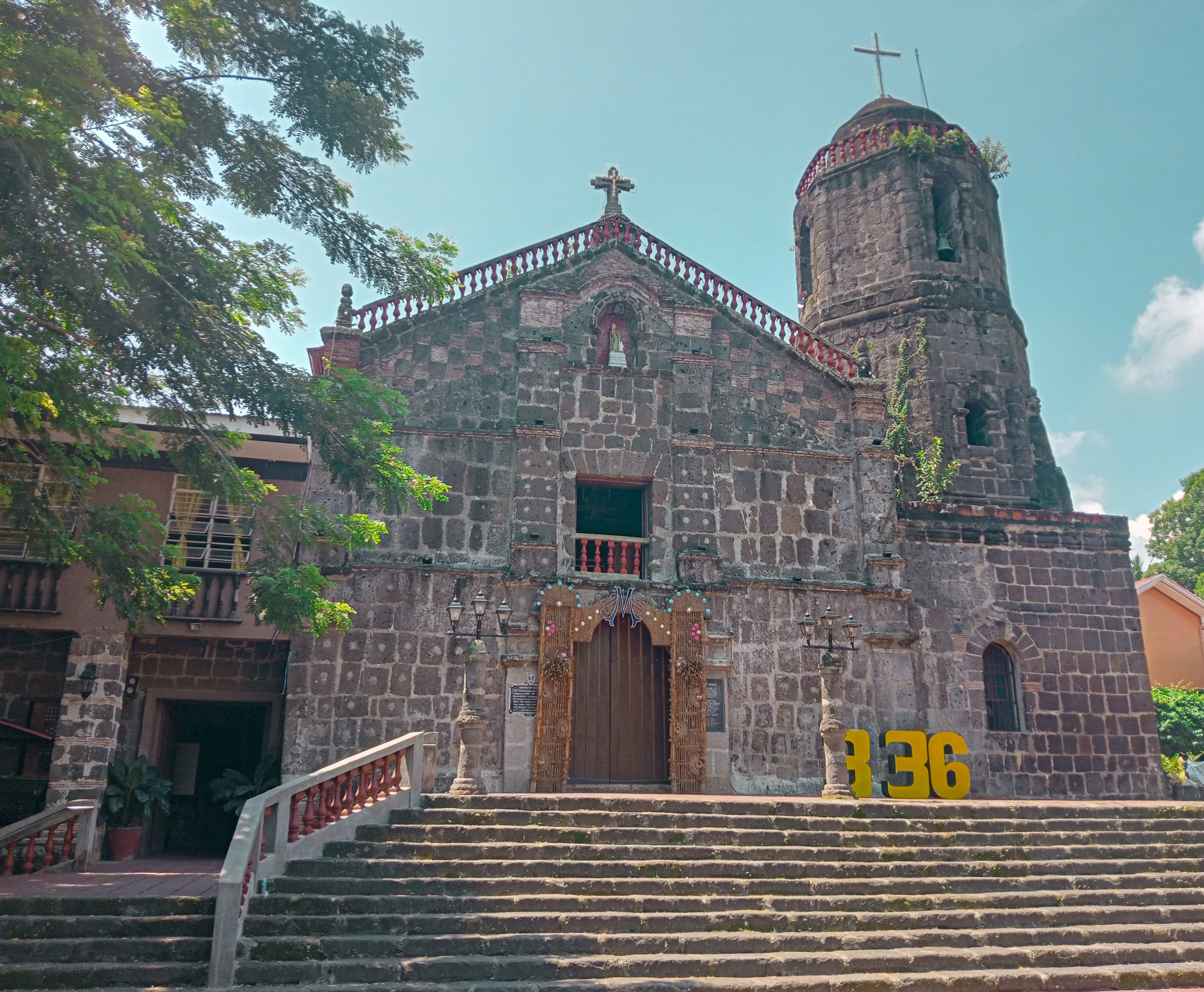
Diocesan Shrine and Parish of Saint Joseph

The oldest and most notable landmark in Baras is the Diocesan Shrine and Parish of Saint Joseph, it enshrines the miraculous venerated image of San Jose de Baras. The Church was built by the Franciscan missionaries in 1682, the same year the town was transferred to its present site. It was completed in 1686 and was dedicated to Saint Joseph, the town's patron saint. It is known for having bats in its ceiling. The Church has been seen in films, TV series and commercials.

=== Palo Alto Falls ===
A man-made falls in Palo Alto located in Marcos Highway (Marikina–Infanta Highway)

=== Kinamatayan Falls ===
Legend says two lovers who had family issues committed suicide at the falls so no one will be able to separate them. The Falls is now being managed by the Local Government Unit.

=== Masungi Georeserve ===
A conservation area adjacent to Garden Cottages located in the mountainous section Marcos Highway (Markina-Infanta Highway) of Baras by its border with Tanay, Rizal.

=== Other places ===
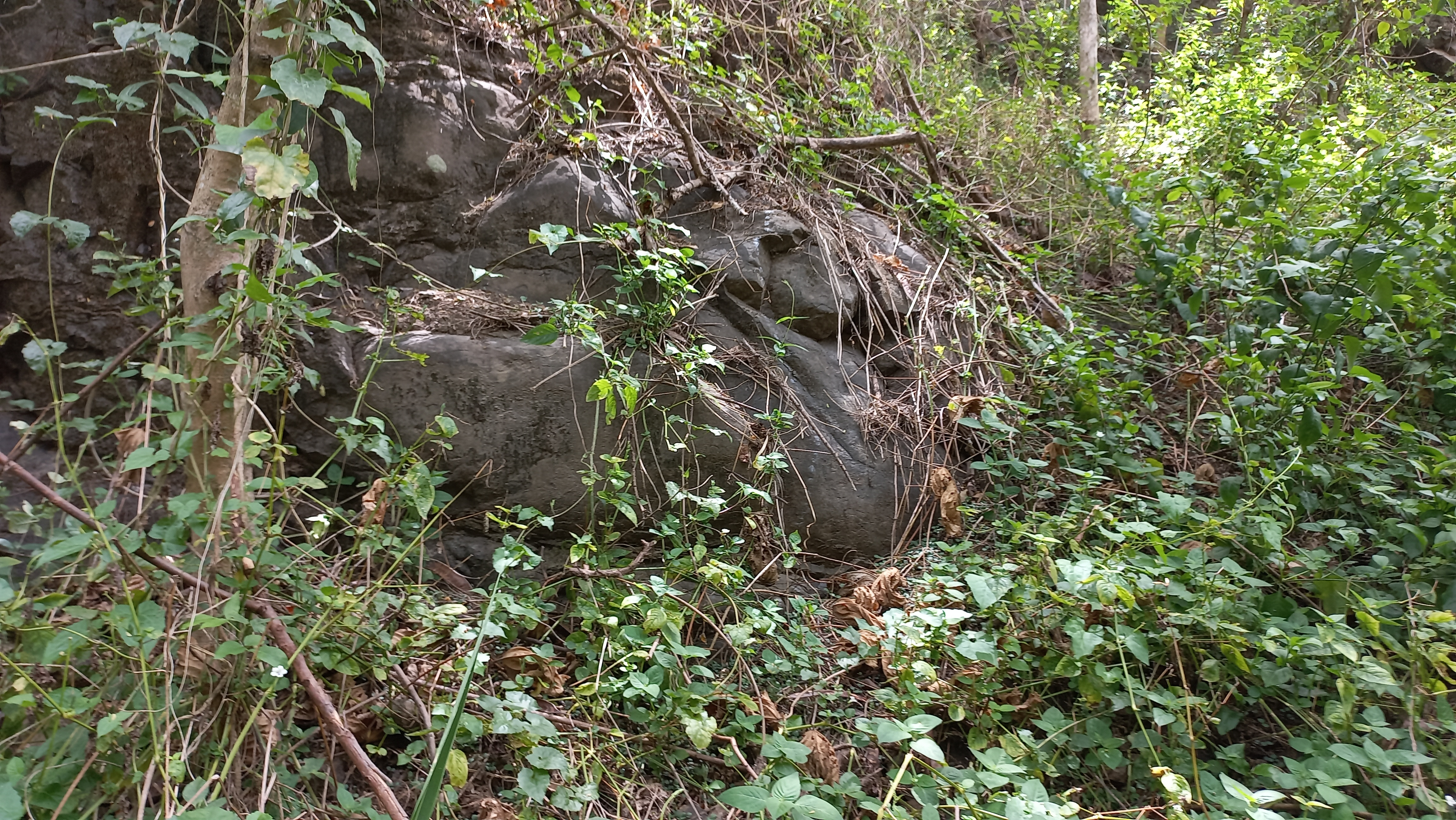
Pillow basalt outcrop in Barangay Pinugay

- The site of the 53rd Infantry Division of the Philippine Commonwealth Army, the military general headquarters, military camps and garrison was located at Camp Caparas in Concepcion, Baras, Rizal from January 3, 1942, to June 30, 1946. During the Battle for the Liberation of Manila in 1945, over 15,700 Filipino soldiers, tanks, armored fighting vehicles, military trucks, artilleries and many other equipment of the 53rd Infantry Division of the Philippine Commonwealth Army were sent from Military GHQ at Camp Caparas to support military operations in Manila from February to March 1945.
- It was the site of the General Agustin Marking Guerrilla Unit which was founded in 1942 and disbanded in 1945.

== Sikaran ==
Baras is also the home of the Philippines' native martial arts', Sikaran. This ancient martial art was popular among the farmers in the village of Bara even before the Spanish conquest of the Philippine archipelago in 1521.

Hari Osias Banaag, founder of the Global Sikaran Federation and diplomat for the traditional game, is an appointed member of the Ad hoc Advisory Committee at the UNESCO Collective Consultation Meeting on the Preservation and the Promotion of Traditional Sports and Game (TSG).

== Education ==
The Baras Schools District Office governs all educational institutions within the municipality. It oversees the management and operations of all private and public, from primary to secondary schools.

=== Primary and elementary schools ===
- Academy of the East Pinugay
- Baras Elementary School
- Baras Pinugay Elementary School
- Evangelista Elementary School
- Israel Light Learning Center
- Malalim Elementary School
- Painaan Elementary School
- Pinugay Elementary School
- Saint Joseph Parish School
- Santiago Elementary School
- San Roque Elementary School
- Shepherd Angels Christian School
- Sisters of Our Lady of Amersfoort School

=== Secondary schools ===
- Baras National High School
- Baras Pinugay National High School
- Baras Pinugay Phase 2 National High School
- Baras Senior High School
