= Bartolomé Revilla =

Filipino lawyer and politician

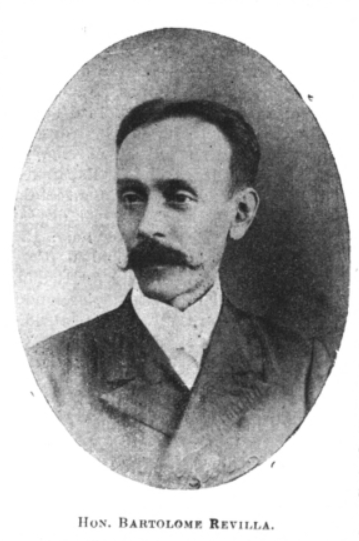

Member of the Philippine Assembly from Rizal's 2nd district
- In office October 16, 1907 – October 16, 1909
- Preceded by: Position created
- Succeeded by: José Tupas

Personal details
- Born: August 24, 1867 San Miguel de Mayumo, Bulacan, Captaincy General of the Philippines
- Died: May 7, 1922 (aged 54) Manila, Philippine Islands
- Party: Nacionalista
- Other political affiliations: Progresista (pre-1907)
- Spouse: Vitaliana Revilla
- Education: University of Santo Tomas
- Occupation: Judge, law professor, politician
- Profession: Lawyer

Military service
- Branch/service: Philippine Revolutionary Army
- Rank: Lieutenant

Bartolomé Revilla y San José (August 24, 1867 – May 7, 1922) was a Filipino lawyer, judge, law professor and politician.

Revilla was the first Representative of the 2nd district of Rizal during the 1st Philippine Legislature from 1907 to 1909. He also served as a judge in several Philippine provinces.

== Bibliography ==
- Cullinane, Michael (1989). Ilustrado Politics: Filipino Elite Responses to American Rule, 1898-1908. Ateneo de Manila University Press. ISBN 9789715504393
