= Tanay, Rizal =

Municipality in the Philippines

Tanay
- Municipality
- Municipality of Tanay
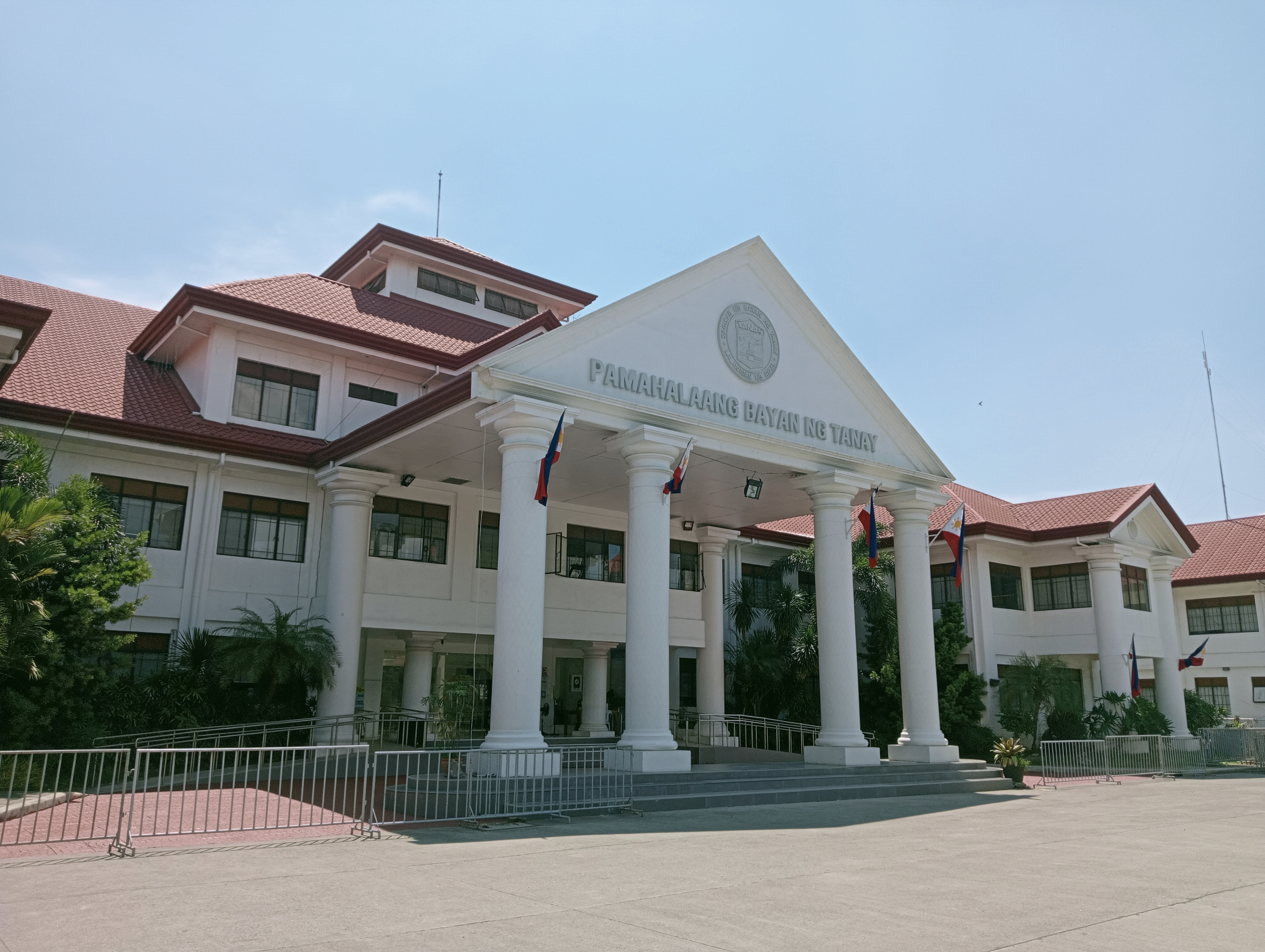
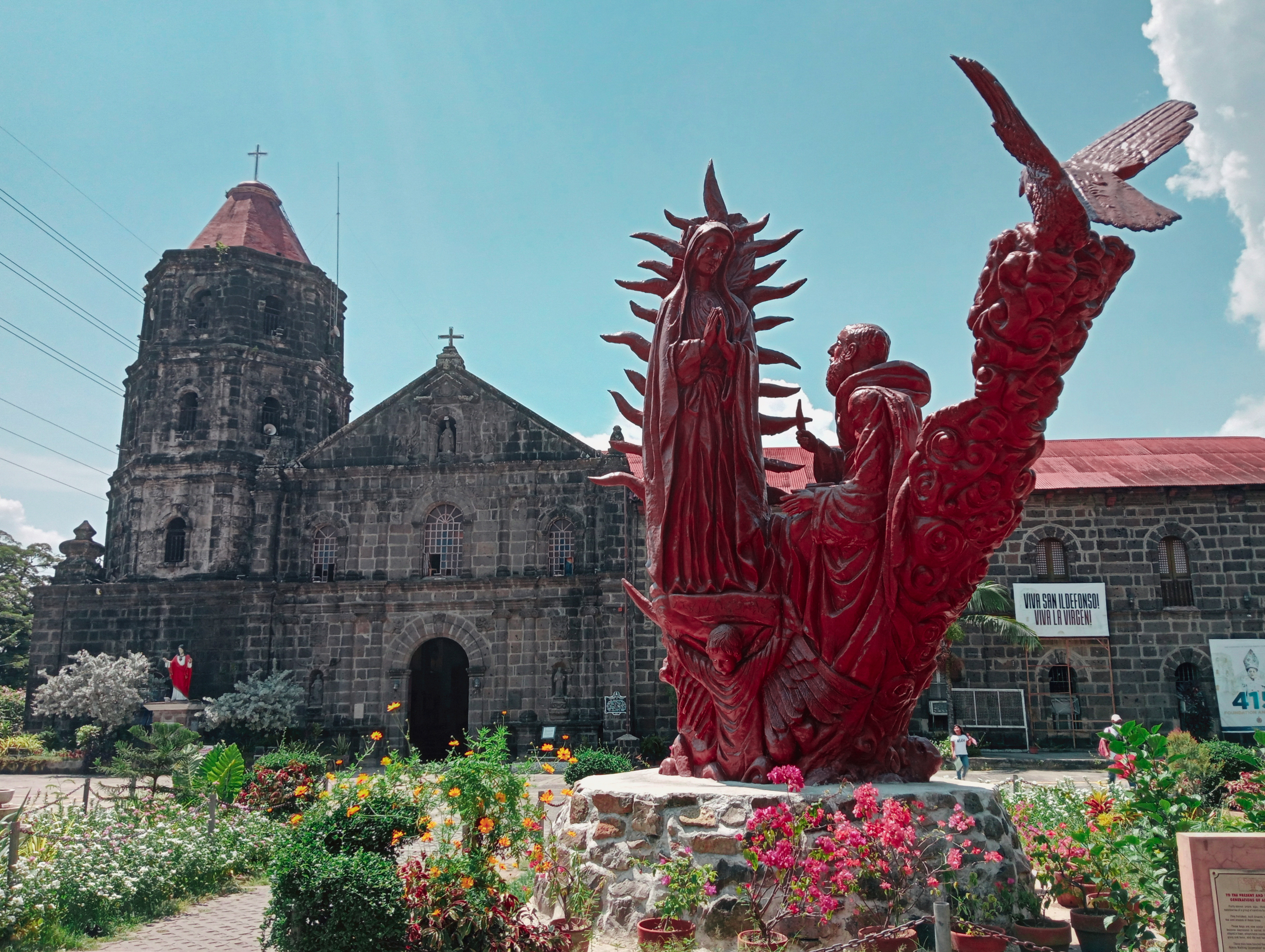
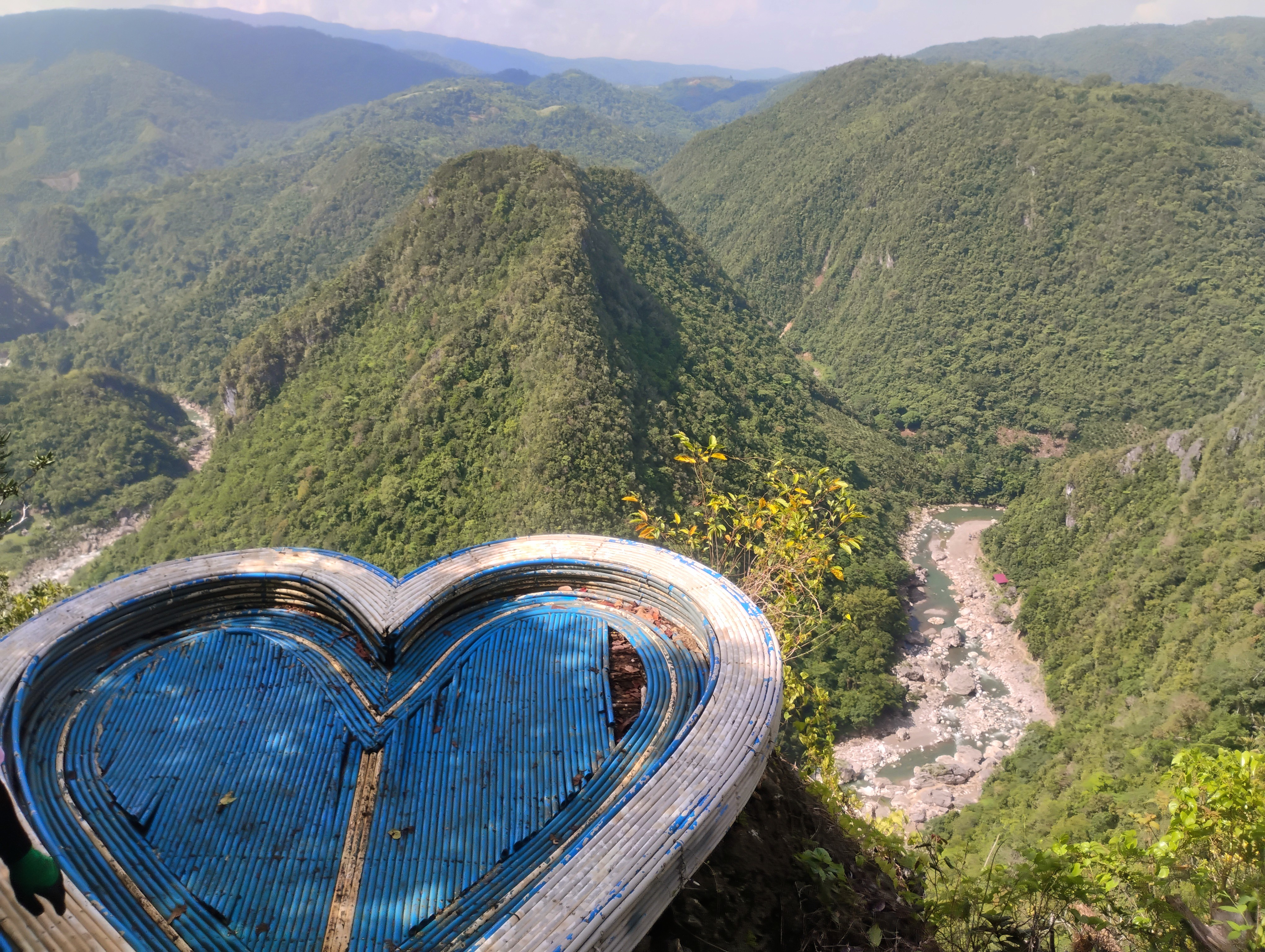
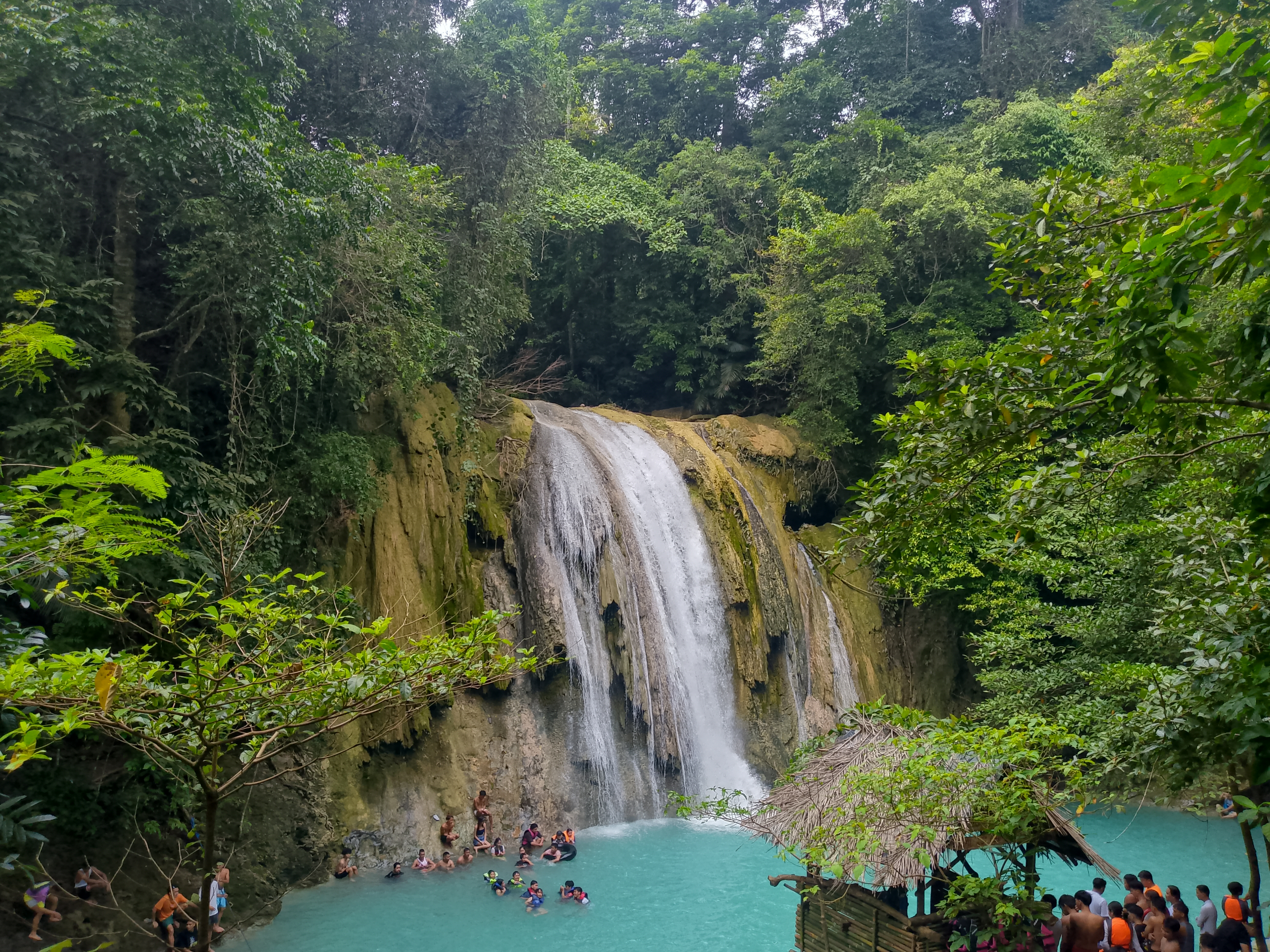
- Tanay Municipal Hall San Ildefonso de Toledo Parish Church Heart Peak in Mount Daraitan Tanay Park Daranak Falls

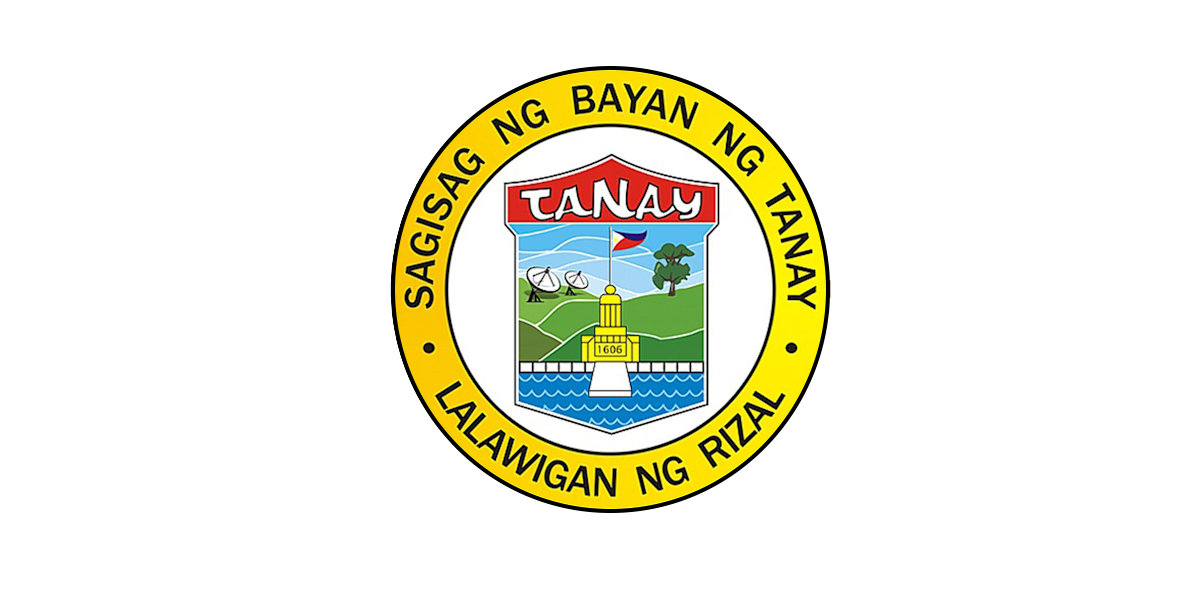
- Flag Seal
- Nickname: Tourism Capital of Rizal
- Motto(s): Home of Adventure and Nature Experience
- Anthem: Tanay Dakila ka
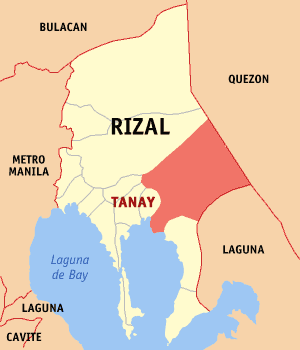
- Map of Rizal with Tanay highlighted
- Interactive map of Tanay
- Location within the Philippines
- Coordinates: 14°29′50″N 121°17′11″E
- Country: Philippines
- Region: Calabarzon
- Province: Rizal
- District: 2nd district
- Founded: November 12, 1606
- Named for: "Monte de Tan-ay"
- Barangays: 20 (see Barangays)

Government
  - Type: Sangguniang Bayan
  - Mayor: Rex Manuel C. Tanjuatco (NPC)
  - Vice Mayor: Ruel P. Estrella (KBL)
  - Representative: Emigdio P. Tanjuatco III (NPC)
  - Municipal Council: Members: Gina P. Berdan; Rogelio D. Cartolos Jr.; Harold F. Catameo; Paula B. De Guzman; Nelson M. Ocampo; Angelo S. Pitoral; Lois Nell Joy T. Tica; Enrique S. Vergel De Dios
  - Electorate: 71,870 voters (2025)

Area
  - Total: 200.00 km^{2} (77.22 sq mi)
- Elevation: 37 m (121 ft)
- Highest elevation: 1,467 m (4,813 ft)
- Lowest elevation: 1 m (3.3 ft)

Population (2024 census)
  - Total: 145,597
  - Density: 727.99/km^{2} (1,885.5/sq mi)
  - Households: 33,178

Economy
  - Income class: 1st municipal income class
  - Poverty incidence: 14.21% (2023)
  - Revenue: ₱ 661.3 million (2024)
  - Assets: ₱ 3,045 million (2024)
  - Expenditure: ₱ 599.3 million (2024)
  - Liabilities: ₱ 1,089 million (2024)

Service provider
  - Electricity: Manila Electric Company
  - Water: Tanay Water District
- Time zone: UTC+8 (PST)
- ZIP code: 1980
- PSGC: 0405812000
- IDD : area code: +63 (0)2
- Native languages: Hatang Kayi (Remontado Dumagat); Tagalog
- Major religions: Roman Catholicism
- Feast date: January 22–24 – Tanay Town Fiesta October 28 – Barangay Sampaloc Fiesta November – Tanay Hane Festival
- Catholic diocese: Diocese of Antipolo
- Patron saint: Ildephonsus of Toledo; Our Lady of Guadalupe – (Town Proper), Holy Cross – (Barangay Tandang Kutyo), Jude the Apostle – (Barangay Sampaloc), and Holy Family – (Barangay Cuyambay)
- Website: www.tanay.gov.ph

Tanay, officially the Municipality of Tanay (Filipino: Bayan ng Tanay IPA: [tɐˈnaɪ]), is a municipality in the province of Rizal, Philippines. According to the 2024 census, it has a population of 145,597 people.

It is home to the namesake Tanay–Paete dialect of Tagalog, which apart from this municipality is spoken on other towns located on the eastern shores of the Laguna Lake.

== History ==
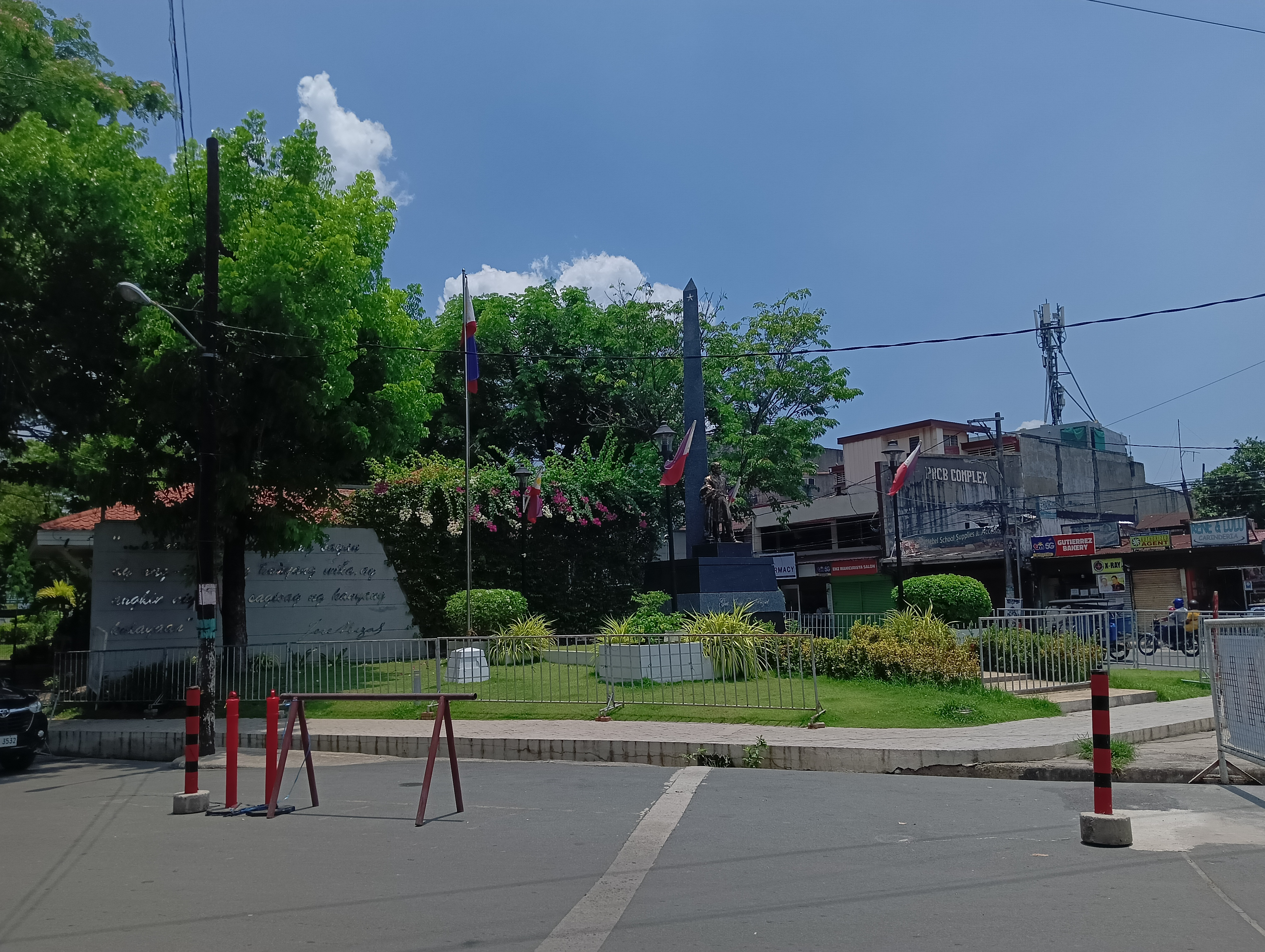
Rizal Shrine near the San Ildefonso de Toledo Church.

Tanay was settled by early Austronesian people. Shortly after the conquest and subjugation of Manila by the Spaniards and the surrounding lake areas by Juan de Salcedo in 1570–1574, Franciscan missionaries arrived to Christianize the inhabitants of what is now the Morong-Pililla area. In 1583, both Morong and Pililla were created as separate towns with Tanay forming part of Pililla.

Tanay was founded as a separate pueblo (town) in 1606 under the name "Monte de Tan-ay". In 1620, administration was moved to San Antonio (now called Inalsan or Pantay) and Tandang Kutyo. In 1638, the town was burned during an uprising of Chinese living in the area, and the town was rebuilt in 1640 at its present location.

In 1747, the town of Tanay consisted of only eight barangays, namely Nuestra Senora del Rosario, Sa Josep, San Ildefonso de Tanay, San Francisco de Maytubig, San Pedro de Alcantara, San Lucas y San Antonio, San Apostol, and San Agustin de Balugbog.

In 1853, a new political subdivision was formed. The town of Tanay together with Morong, Baras, Pililla, Angono, Binangonan and Jalajala formed the province of La Laguna, with the capital at Morong. This district was later changed to Distrito Politico-Militar de Morong in 1857. Tanay's present-day eastern portion was also claimed as part of Bulacan.

Tanay became a Municipality in 1894 as an effect of the Spanish Maura Law. The first election of Public Office took place in 1895–1898 and 1898–1900 under the Revolutionary Government of the Philippines.

Tanay members of the Katipunan fought valiantly during the Revolution against Spain. The town was the headquarters of the second military area of the Philippine Revolutionary Government under Emilio Aguinaldo. Between 1899 and 1900, Tanay served as the capital of the then Morong Province after the Philippine–American War broke out and the American forces invaded the lake towns and captured Antipolo.

In 1900–1901, Tanay was under the Government appointed by the American Military under the Taft Commission. From 1903 to 1934 the town leadership was under American rule then in 1934 Tanay was under the Commonwealth of the Philippines as the Tydings–McDuffie Act was approved on March 24, 1934, until the Philippines fell to the hands of the Japanese during the Second World War in 1942.

In 1942–1945 the mountains of Tanay served as the base for 'Marking's Fil-American Guerrillas, beginning the Liberation of Tanay in March 1945.

On June 19, 1959, Republic Act No. 2336, also known as "An Act Establishing a Summer Resort in Sampaloc, Municipality of Tanay, Province of Rizal" was approved whereas there is hereby established a summer resort in Sampaloc.

In October 2003, deposed Philippine president Joseph Estrada was transferred to a rest home in Sampaloc, a mountain barangay. He remained under house arrest until he was given executive clemency by President Gloria Macapagal Arroyo.

During Typhoon Ketsana (Ondoy) on September 26, 2009, Tanay was one of the hardest hit towns due to overflowing of Laguna de Bay and the Tanay River.

== Geography ==
Tanay is located 37 kilometers (23 mi) from Antipolo and 54 kilometers (34 mi) from Manila. It contains portions of the Sierra Madre Mountains and is bordered by Rodriguez in the north, Antipolo in the north-west, Baras, Morong and Teresa in the west, General Nakar (Quezon) in the east, and Pililla, Santa Maria (Laguna) as well as the lake Laguna de Bay in the south.

=== Barangays ===
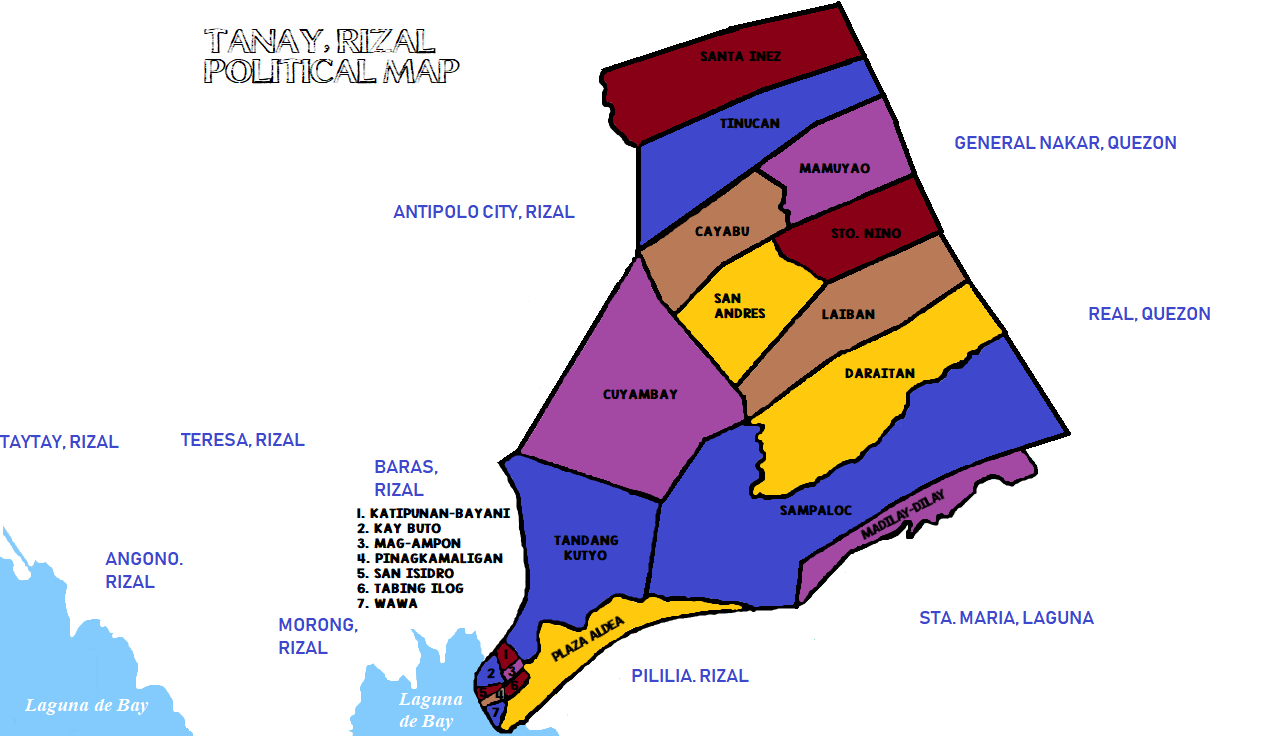
Political subdivisions

Tanay is politically subdivided into 20 barangays (10 urban, 10 rural), as indicated below and in the image herein. Each barangay consists of puroks and some have sitios.

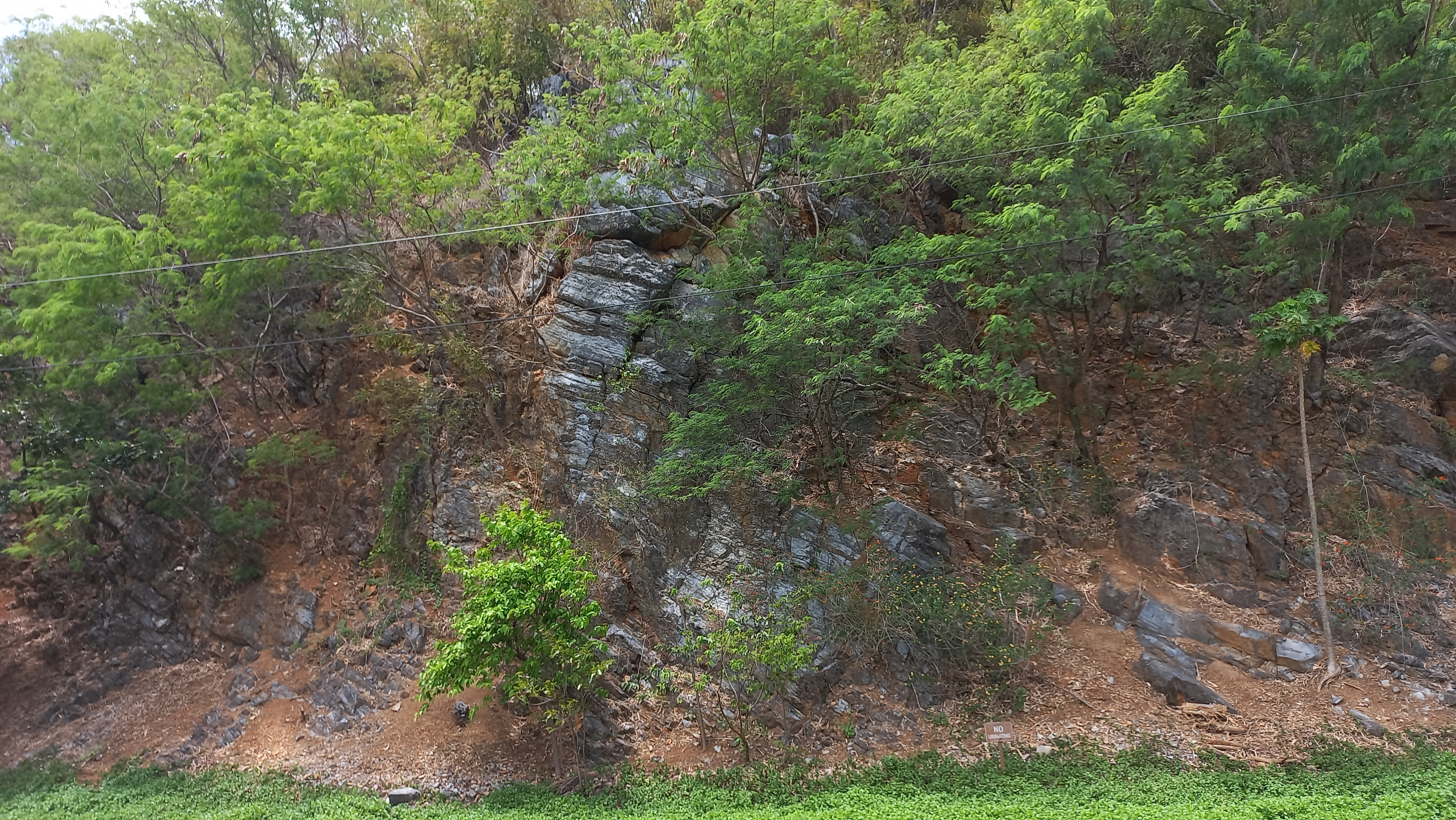
Limestone outcrop somewhere in barangay Cuyambay

Barangay	Population (2024)	Area
Cayabu	1,116	
Cuyambay	4,205	
Daraitan	5,870	
Katipunan-Bayani	6,246	
Kaybuto (Poblacion)	9,166	
Laiban	2,425	
Mag-Ampon (Poblacion)	1,989	
Mamuyao	919	
Pinagkamaligan (Poblacion)	3,629	
Plaza Aldea (Poblacion)	33,322	
Sampaloc	32,624	
San Andres	1,477	
San Isidro (Poblacion)	3,288	
Santa Inez	2,460	
Santo Niño	1,549	
Tabing Ilog (Poblacion)	1,891	
Tandang Kutyo (Poblacion)	21,243	
Tinucan	1,230	
Wawa (Poblacion)	8,106	
Madilay-dilay	2,842	
Total	145,597	

In 2018, barangay Madilaydilay was created after receiving the required number of votes in a plebiscite for its creation which then increased the number of barangays in Tanay from 19 to 20.

=== Climate ===
Climate data for Tanay (1999–2020, extremes 2000–2023)
Month	Jan	Feb	Mar	Apr	May	Jun	Jul	Aug	Sep	Oct	Nov	Dec	Year
Record high °C (°F)	28.1 (82.6)	29.5 (85.1)	31.0 (87.8)	32.5 (90.5)	34.0 (93.2)	32.0 (89.6)	31.5 (88.7)	31.0 (87.8)	30.6 (87.1)	30.1 (86.2)	29.0 (84.2)	28.5 (83.3)	34.0 (93.2)
Mean daily maximum °C (°F)	24.1 (75.4)	24.8 (76.6)	26.3 (79.3)	28.4 (83.1)	28.9 (84.0)	27.8 (82.0)	26.6 (79.9)	26.0 (78.8)	26.4 (79.5)	26.3 (79.3)	25.6 (78.1)	24.4 (75.9)	26.3 (79.3)
Daily mean °C (°F)	21.3 (70.3)	21.7 (71.1)	22.8 (73.0)	24.5 (76.1)	25.1 (77.2)	24.5 (76.1)	23.6 (74.5)	23.2 (73.8)	23.5 (74.3)	23.4 (74.1)	22.8 (73.0)	21.9 (71.4)	23.2 (73.8)
Mean daily minimum °C (°F)	18.5 (65.3)	18.5 (65.3)	19.3 (66.7)	20.6 (69.1)	21.3 (70.3)	21.2 (70.2)	20.6 (69.1)	20.5 (68.9)	20.6 (69.1)	20.4 (68.7)	19.9 (67.8)	19.4 (66.9)	20.1 (68.2)
Record low °C (°F)	14.8 (58.6)	13.0 (55.4)	13.0 (55.4)	16.0 (60.8)	15.5 (59.9)	15.0 (59.0)	16.0 (60.8)	13.5 (56.3)	15.0 (59.0)	15.0 (59.0)	15.0 (59.0)	13.5 (56.3)	13.0 (55.4)
Average rainfall mm (inches)	73.4 (2.89)	58.3 (2.30)	41.6 (1.64)	37.6 (1.48)	186.5 (7.34)	255.6 (10.06)	450.9 (17.75)	464.1 (18.27)	448.1 (17.64)	283.3 (11.15)	247.7 (9.75)	247.0 (9.72)	2,794.1 (110.00)
Average rainy days (≥ 1 mm)	9	7	6	5	11	16	20	21	19	17	16	15	162
Average relative humidity (%)	89	88	86	83	86	90	92	93	92	90	90	91	89
Source: PAGASA

== Demographics ==
Population census of Tanay
Year	Pop.	±% p.a.
1903	4,124	—
1918	6,704	+3.29%
1939	8,228	+0.98%
1948	8,627	+0.53%
1960	13,955	+4.09%
1970	23,247	+5.23%
1975	33,382	+7.53%
1980	40,443	+3.91%
1990	58,410	+3.75%
1995	69,181	+3.22%
2000	78,223	+2.67%
2007	94,460	+2.64%
2010	98,879	+1.68%
2015	117,830	+3.40%
2020	139,420	+3.60%
2024	145,597	+1.05%
Source: Philippine Statistics Authority

In the 2024 census, the population of Tanay was 145,597 people, with a density of 730 inhabitants per square kilometer or 1,900 inhabitants per square mile.

The majority of the population consists of Tagalogs who live near Laguna de Bay, though there is also a significant percentage of mountain-dwelling people living in the northern portions of the municipality. The town's major trades consist of fishing, agriculture and regional commerce.

The roots of the Sambalic languages can be traced back to Tanay, where the etymologically similar Sinauna (erroneously labeled before as a dialect of Tagalog) or Remontado Dumagat is still spoken in villages in the Sierra Madre mountains between Sampaloc and General Nakar, Quezon.

== Economy ==
Poverty incidence of Tanay (%)

Source: Philippine Statistics Authority

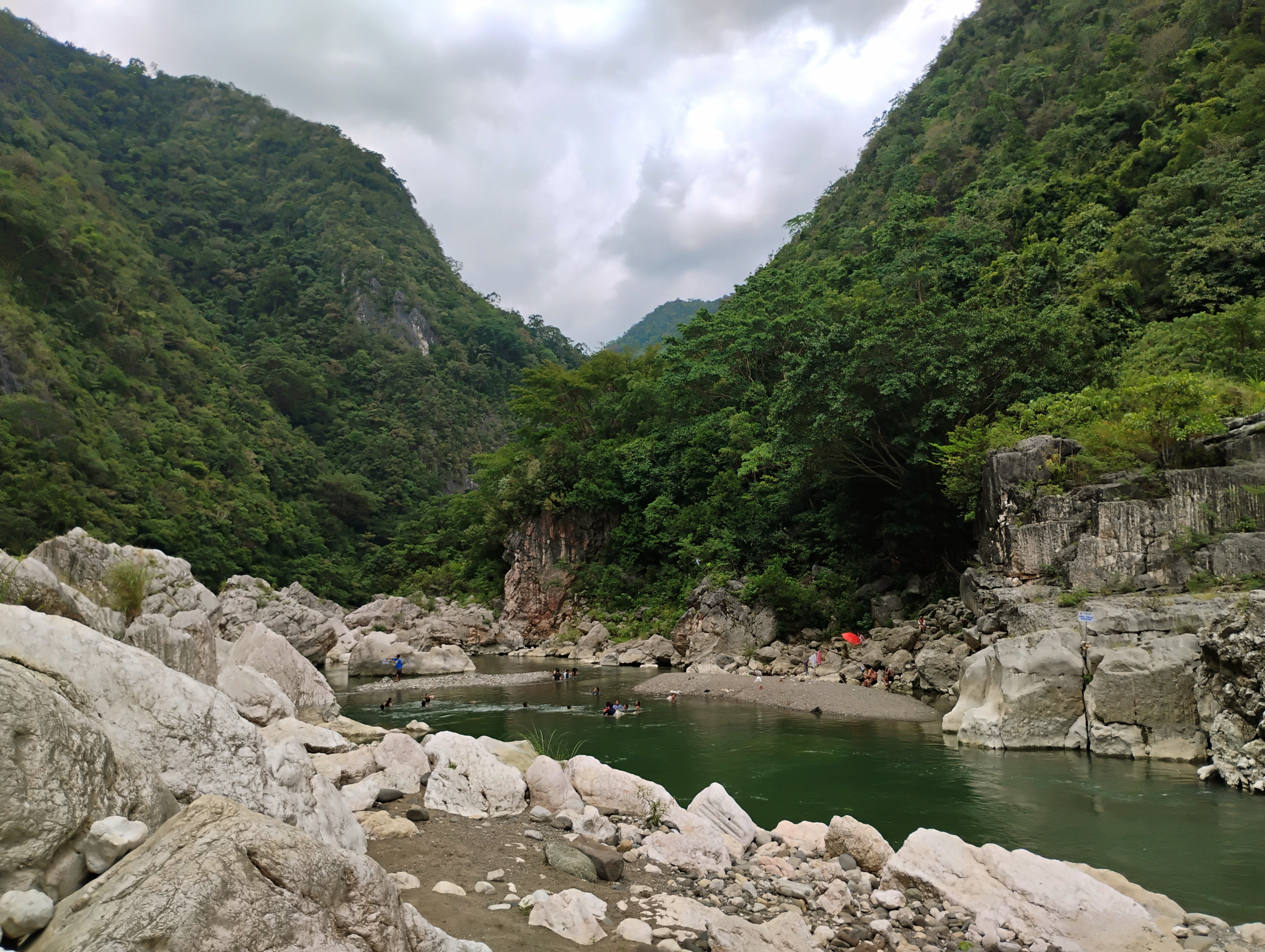
Tinipak (Agos) River and Rock Formations

=== Tanay Rodeo Festival ===
To promote and market the town's cattle and agri-eco tourism not only within the municipality but also in the Calabarzon region, the Municipal Government of Tanay holds Tanay Rodeo every third week of January each year. The festival is also in line with the celebration of Tanay Town Fiesta. It is participated by professionals and rodeo enthusiasts, and veterinary/animal science students from renowned universities in the country.

== Government ==
=== Local government ===
Position	Name	Political Party	Gather Votes
Mayor	Rex Manuel C. Tanjuatco	NPC	36,695
Vice Mayor	Ruel P. Estrella	KBL	27,271
Councilor	Lois Nell Joy T. Tica	NPC	26,582
Councior	Gina P. Berdan	Independent	25,466
Councilor	Nelson M. Ocampo	NPC	23,744
Councilor	Angelo S. Pitoral	NPC	22,237
Councilor	Enrique S. Vergel De Dios	NPC	20,818
Councilor	Rogelio D. Cartolos Jr.	NPC	20,811
Councilor	Harold F. Catameo	KBL	20,066
Councilor	Paula B. De Guzman	NPC	20,030
ABC Chairman	TBF	TBF	TBF
SK President	TBF	TBF	TBF

== Education ==
There are two schools district offices which govern all educational institutions within the municipality. They oversee the management and operations of all private and public, from primary to secondary schools. These are the Tanay I Schools District, and Tanay II Schools District.

=== Primary and elementary schools ===
- Academy of St. Peter
- Aguho Elementary
- Alas-Asin Elementary School
- Aldea Elementary School
- Alpha Beth Christian Academy
- Ambassadors of Hope Christian Academy
- Balimbing Elementary School
- Bitik Elementary School
- Blessed Hope Christian School
- Camp Mateo Capinpin Elementary School
- Cayabu Elementary School
- Christian Baptist Academy
- CCC Joyful Christian School
- Cuyambay Elementary School
- Daraetan Elementary School
- Don Domingo Capistrano Memorial Elementary School
- Doña Paz Sumulong Tanjuatco Elementary School
- Esquire Christian School
- Greenfield Montessori School (Main)
- Greenfield Montessori School (Sampaloc Annex)
- Highland Park Christian School
- Ilaya Elementary School
- Laiban Elementary School
- Lorenzo A. Ramos Elementary School
- Madilay-dilay Elementary School
- Magata-Manggahan Elementary School
- Manhain Elementary School
- Mamuyao Elementary School
- Marciana P. Catolos Memorial Elementary School
- Mary Jude Angelic Learning Academy
- Mind Care and Development Academy
- Monte De Tanay Elementary School
- Nayon Elementary School
- Our Lady of Black Madonna School
- Patricio Jarin Memorial Elementary School
- Pinagsabiran Elementary School
- Rawang Elementary School
- Rizal Sports Academy
- Sampaloc Elementary School
- San Andres Elementary School
- Simeon R. Bendaña Sr. Memorial Elementary School
- St. Therese School
- Sta. Ines Elementary School
- Tablon Elementary School
- Tanay Ville Elementary School
- Tinucan Elementary School
- Wawa Elementary School

=== Secondary schools ===
- Aldea National High School
- Cayabu Integrated School
- Cuyambay National High School
- Daraitan Integrated School
- Laiban Integrated School
- Marciana P. Catolos National High School
- Philippine Technological Institute of Science, Arts, and Trade
- Sta. Ines Integrated High School
- Sto. Niño Integrated School
- Tanay East Integrated National High School
- Tanay National High School
- Tanay National Science High School
- Tanay North National High School
- Tanay-Sampaloc Integrated National High School
- Tanay Southeast National High School
- Tanay Senior High School
- Tanay West Integrated National High School

=== Higher educational institutions ===
- Asian Institute of Computer Studies
- International Peace Leadership College
- San Ildefonso College
- STI College Tanay
- University of Rizal System (Main Campus)
