= Morong Church =

Roman Catholic church in Rizal, Philippines

- Diocesan Shrine and Parish of Saint Jerome
- Pandiyosesis na Dambana at Parokya ni San Geronimo (Filipino)
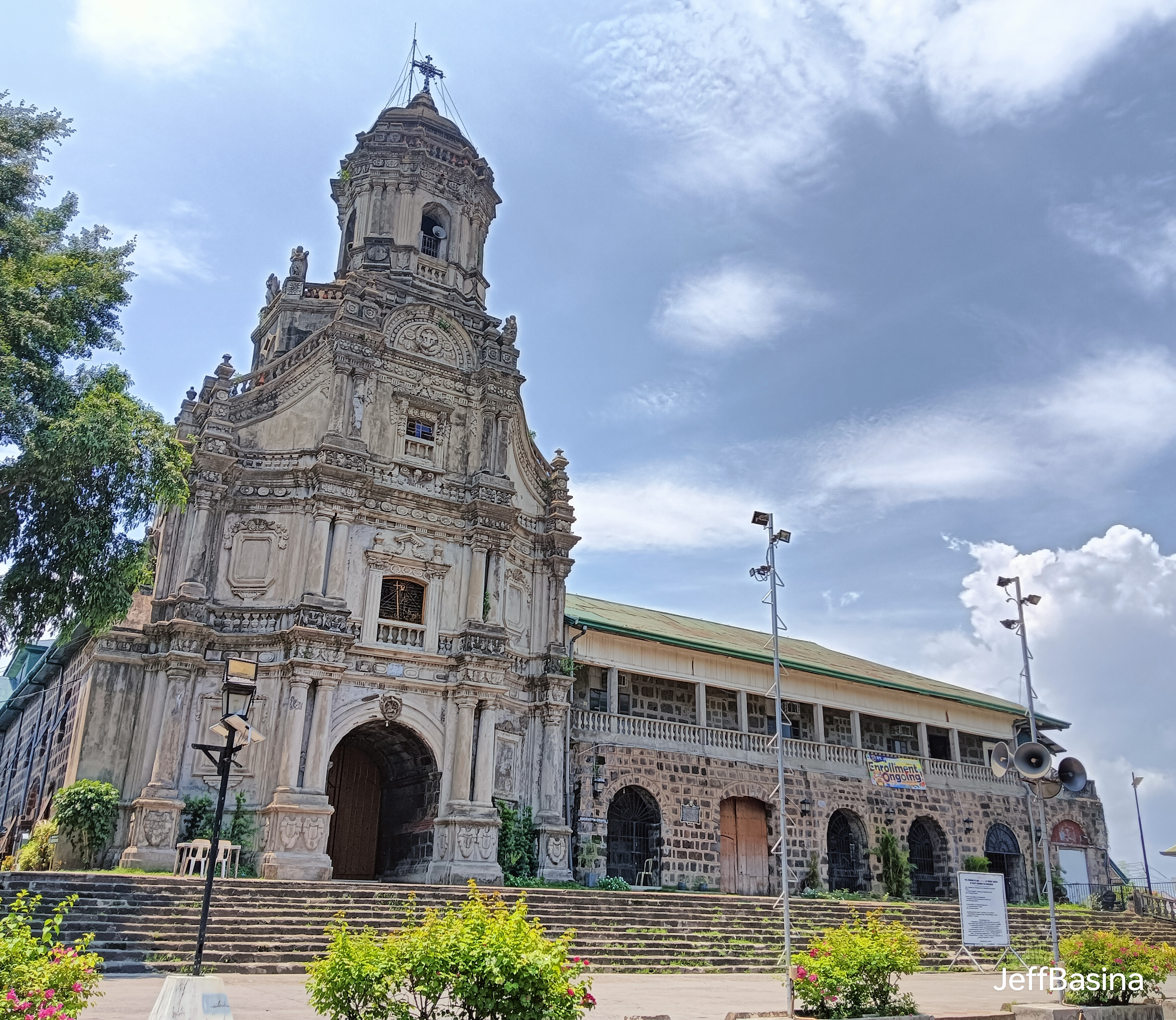
- Church facade in 2024

- Location in Luzon Location in the Philippines
- 14°30′52″N 121°14′16″E
- Location: Morong, Rizal
- Country: Philippines
- Denomination: Roman Catholic

History
- Dedication: St. Jerome

Architecture
- Architectural type: Church building
- Style: Baroque
- Groundbreaking: 1615
- Completed: February 6, 1853

Administration
- Province: Rizal
- Archdiocese: Archdiocese of Manila
- Diocese: Diocese of Antipolo
- Parish: Saint Jerome

Clergy
- Archbishop: Jose Fuerte Advincula
- Bishop: Ruperto Cruz Santos
- Priest: Rev. Fr. Peter Emari C. Balatbat

The Diocesan Shrine and Parish of Saint Jerome, commonly known as Morong Church, is a Roman Catholic church located in Morong, Rizal, Philippines. It is under the jurisdiction of the Diocese of Antipolo and was officially declared as a National Cultural Treasure (NCT) by the National Commission for Culture and the Arts (NCCA) on April 12, 2025. The church was built during the Spanish period in the country, with stones from a hill called Kay Ngaya; lime from the stones of the mountain Kay Maputi; and sand and gravel from Morong River. Fray Pedro Bautista, who is now a saint of the Catholic Church once served at this Parish.

On March 15, 2026, Bishop Ruperto Cruz Santos elevated the status of St. Jerome Parish as a Diocesan Shrine, effective April 29, 2026.

== History ==
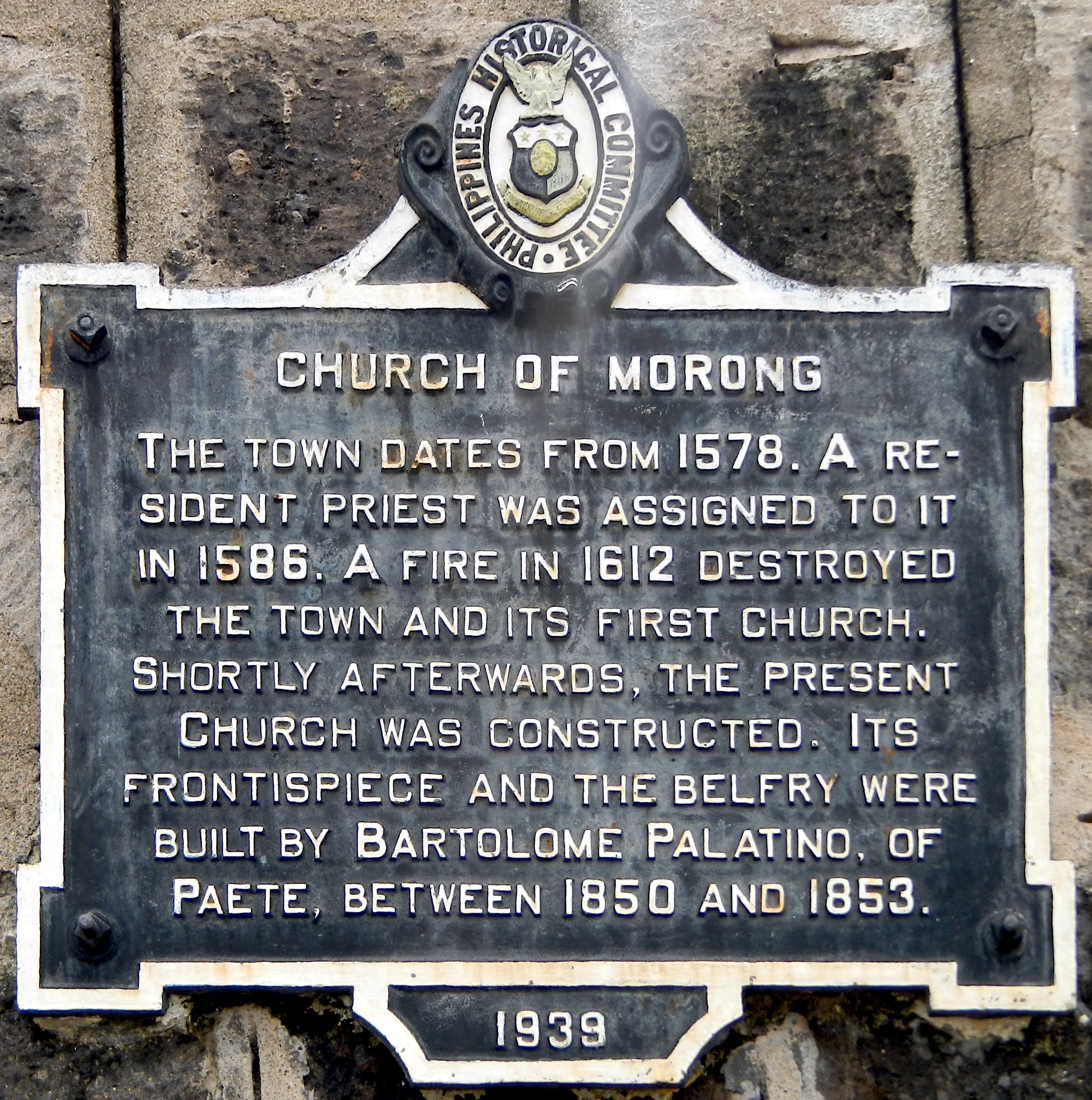
Church PHC historical marker installed in 1939

The town of Morong traces its origins to the pioneering work of the Franciscans Juan de Plasencia and Diego de Oropesa. Both were responsible for starting most of the lake town mission in 1578. They constructed chapels (visitas) attached to a bigger settlement to allow religious and civil administration. Later, this settlement was converted into Pueblo de Morong and was made the provincial capital of the Franciscan Order at that time. Baras, Tanay, Pililla, Cardona, Binangonan and Teresa were the visitas under Pueblo de Morong.

Plasencia was well known for his mastery of Tagalog and is credited with compiling a dictionary of the vernacular and writing a draft of a catechism which is later used for composing the Doctrina Christiana (1593), the first book printed in the Philippines.

It was not until 1586 that Morong had a friar named Blas de la Madre de Dios assigned as first minister of the pueblo. He constructed a wooden church on the south bank of the river, but it was burned down together with a large part of the pueblo in 1612. After three years, a new church was built of stone and mortar on elevated ground at the opposite bank of the Morong River which ensured its safety from floods and fires. It measured 42 varas long by 12 varas wide, had a single nave with semi-circular apse, built under the direction of Chinese master craftsmen. The church, dedicated to Saint Jerome, was completed in 1620. The church had remained substantially unchanged until 1850–53, when Máximo Rico commissioned Bartolomé Palatino, a native of Paete, to renovate the façade and build a bell tower.

The new Baroque façade with a towering height of 20 varas was completed on February 6, 1853, almost three years after its construction.

The Order of the Franciscan Missionaries were first assigned in the church of Morong. As a proof, the Franciscan coat or arms is seen on the main facade of the bell tower, the hands of Jesus and Francis of Assisi. Next were Columban Missionaries.

=== Philippine Revolution ===
After the Cry of Pugadlawin on August 23, 1896, a civil guard stationed in Binangonan named Agustin Natividad escaped from his post and passed the mountain trails to reach Morong. He organized a camp with other Filipino civil guards and attacked Morong. The Spanish casadores and other loyal civil guards retreated to the Gobierno Politico-Militar building while the Katipuneros under Natividad sought refuge in Capitan Mariano's rice camarin. Due to lack of food and arms, they left with their families and attacked Morong Church and forced the enemies to retreat inside the convent and church.

On June 1, 1898, fully armed soldiers from Cavite and a shipment of rifles and a canon arrived to aid the Katipuneros who came from the different points of the Distrito de Morong. The three principal revolutionary leaders at that time were Brigade Commander Miguel Aquino, Assessor Juan Sumulong and Quintin Gonzales. Firing went on as the Spaniards took their stand in the church and convent before surrendering to the Katipuneros on August 19, 1898.

=== Contemporary period ===
The National Commission for Culture and the Arts (NCCA) recognized the Morong Church as a National Cultural Treasure on February 19, 2025. It was later formally declared as such on April 12, 2025 by the NCCA.

The church was elevated as a diocesan shrine in 2026.

== Architecture ==
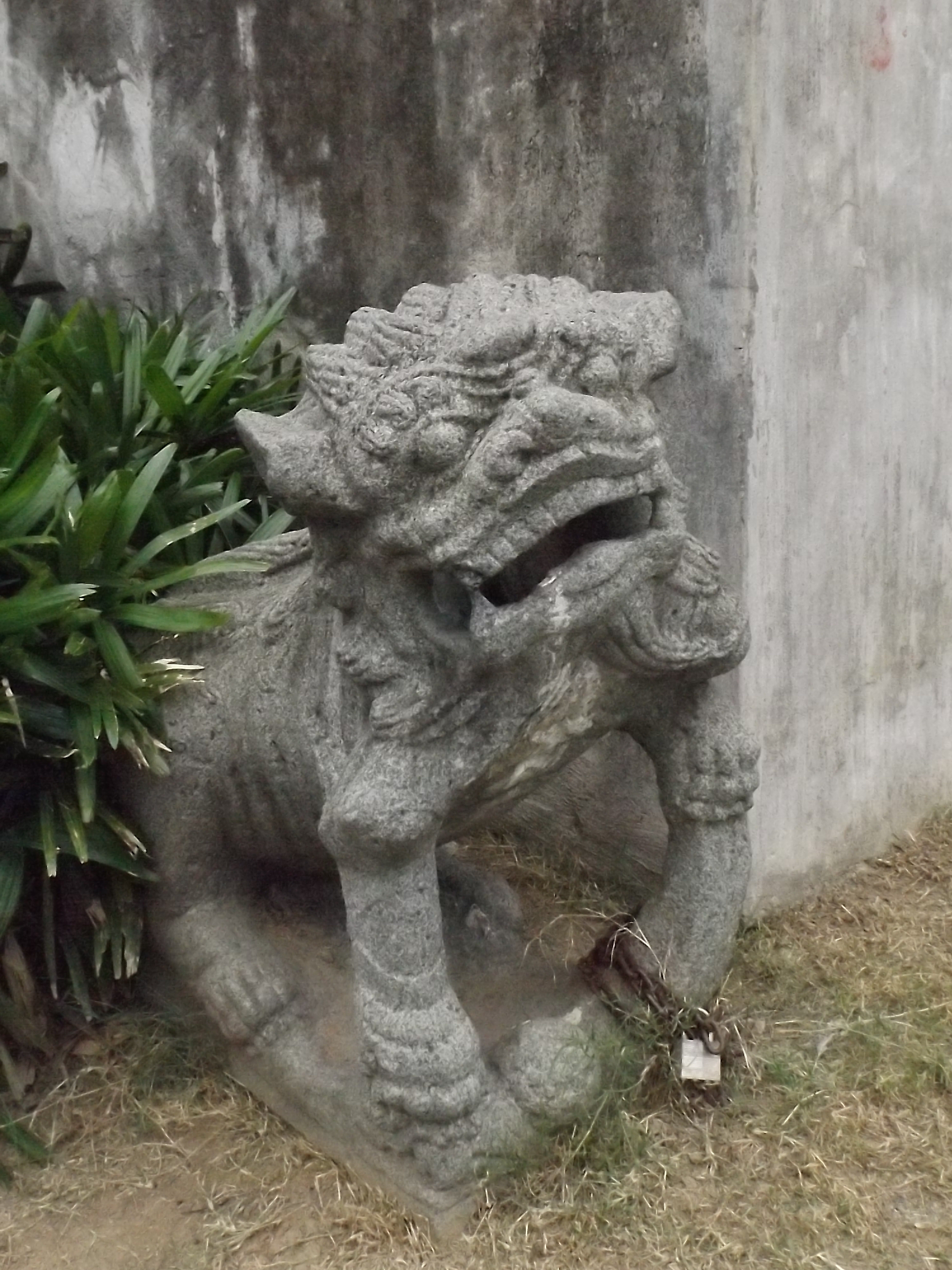
One of the lion sculptures at the side of the church. Note the locked chains

The Morong facade and bell tower is one of the most striking of all church facades along Laguna de Bay. It is frequently photographed and is properly described as Baroque Revival architecture. The central portion of the facade surges outward and the catenated balustrade above give the whole a dynamic felling. Various decorative elements, some Mexican in origin, give the facade a richness characteristic of Baroque. Four angels, representing the cardinal virtues, stand at the corners of the bell tower. Felix Huerta, writing in 1852, states that the facade had finials shaped as jars and shells used for illuminating it.

It is said that it was built by Chinese craftsmen; as evidence, two Chinese lion sculptures (a male and a female lion) at the entrance to the steep driveway. One lion, said to be the lioness, was stolen between 2000 and 2005. Local folklore said that the lioness has a hidden treasure inside it. The other lion, the male lion, is safeguarded at the St. Jerome school.

The stone and mortar church which has a three-story facade, and an octagonal bell tower whose cross is illuminated at night and can be seen from the surrounding countryside. The bell tower of the church is used by fishermen in the nearby towns as a lighthouse when fishing at night and during the storm. Its frontispiece and the belfry were renovated by Bartolome Palatino of Paete between 1850 and 1853.

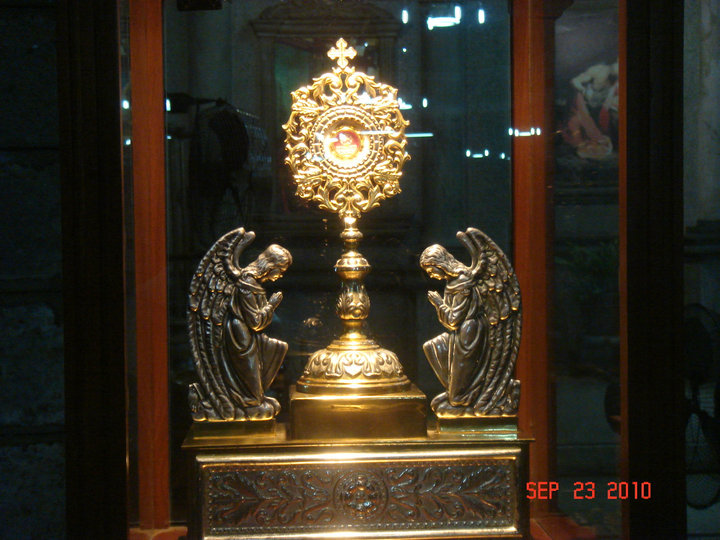
1st class relic of St. Jerome

The church has a relic of the town's patron saint Jerome. The first class relic (a part of the saint's body) was given to the parish year 2005, through the effort of then parish priest Lawrence "Larry" Paz, when they had their first pilgrimage tour to the Holy Land and Vatican City.

The relic is publicly exposed every Saturday during the anticipated Mass, guarded by the knights of Saint Jerome, while the kissing of the relic is done every last Saturday of the month. After two years, a bigger relic was given in 2007 to the parish as a gift from the main chaplain of the church of St. Jerome in Rome. This relic is now buried on top of the table of the main altar which is kissed by the priest during a Mass.

== Renovations ==
The following were the most significant projects done according to the records of the parish:

Year	Priest	Renovations
1948	Hugh O'Reilly	The dome (bubida) was repaired and reconstructed. Paintings of the Four Evangelists (John, Luke, Mark and Matthew) were set up on the sides of the dome.
1950–1953	John Kaiser (1st term)	The old convent was repaired. Classrooms were constructed for the newly established St. Jerome's Academy. The old main altar was demolished and a provisional wooden altar was constructed.
1959–1961	John Kaiser (2nd term)	A new convent was constructed on the western side of the church, separate from the main church building.
1961	James McCarthy	Through the initiative of the Historical Conservation Society, the repair, restoration and renovation of the church facade and belfry was made possible.
1967–1969	Thomas Conolly; Victor Gaboury	All stone walls of the church inside and outside and the ceilings were repaired and restored. Marble tiles were laid on the floor of the sanctuary/main hall.
1981–1988	John Stratton	Landscaping of the churchyard The provisional wooden altar was demolished and a concrete main altar was constructed. Stairways going to the churchyard was restored.
1991–1994	Patrick O'Herlihy	The convent was repaired and an extension was constructed. A new concrete belfry at the back and east side of the church building was constructed. The plan was drawn by Arch. Ricardo S.D. Gutierrez.
1993	Patrick O'Herlihy	The old baptistry was converted into an Adoration Chapel.
1994–1997	Arnold Layoc	Stained glass pictures of the Four Evangelists (John, Luke, Mark and Matthew) were set up on the windows of the walls of the sanctuary on the east and west sides of the dome (bubida). Stained glass pictures of Jesus and Mary (Twin Hearts) were set up on the windows at the western sides of the central hall. Stained glass picture of St. Jerome was set up on the southern window of the choir loft. Landscaping of the area in front of the church convent.
1997–1999	Felipe Pedraja	Repairs, renovations and changing of electrical wirings and connections
1999–2006	Larry Paz	The convent and Office of the Parish were repaired and renovated.
2000	Larry Paz	All wooden church doors were repaired. "Dambana ng Kagalakan" was constructed. Lamp posts around the patio and on the southern side of the driveway were installed. Brick tiles were laid on the ground of the patio.
2001	Larry Paz	St. Jerome statue was placed on the garden in front of the convent. The Adoration Chapel was renovated and a wooden altar was constructed.
2005	Larry Paz	The relic of St. Jerome was embedded in the main altar. The perimeter wall on the southern side of the churchyard, which was struck by lightning, was restored. Steel spiral stairs going up the choir loft was constructed.

== Gallery ==
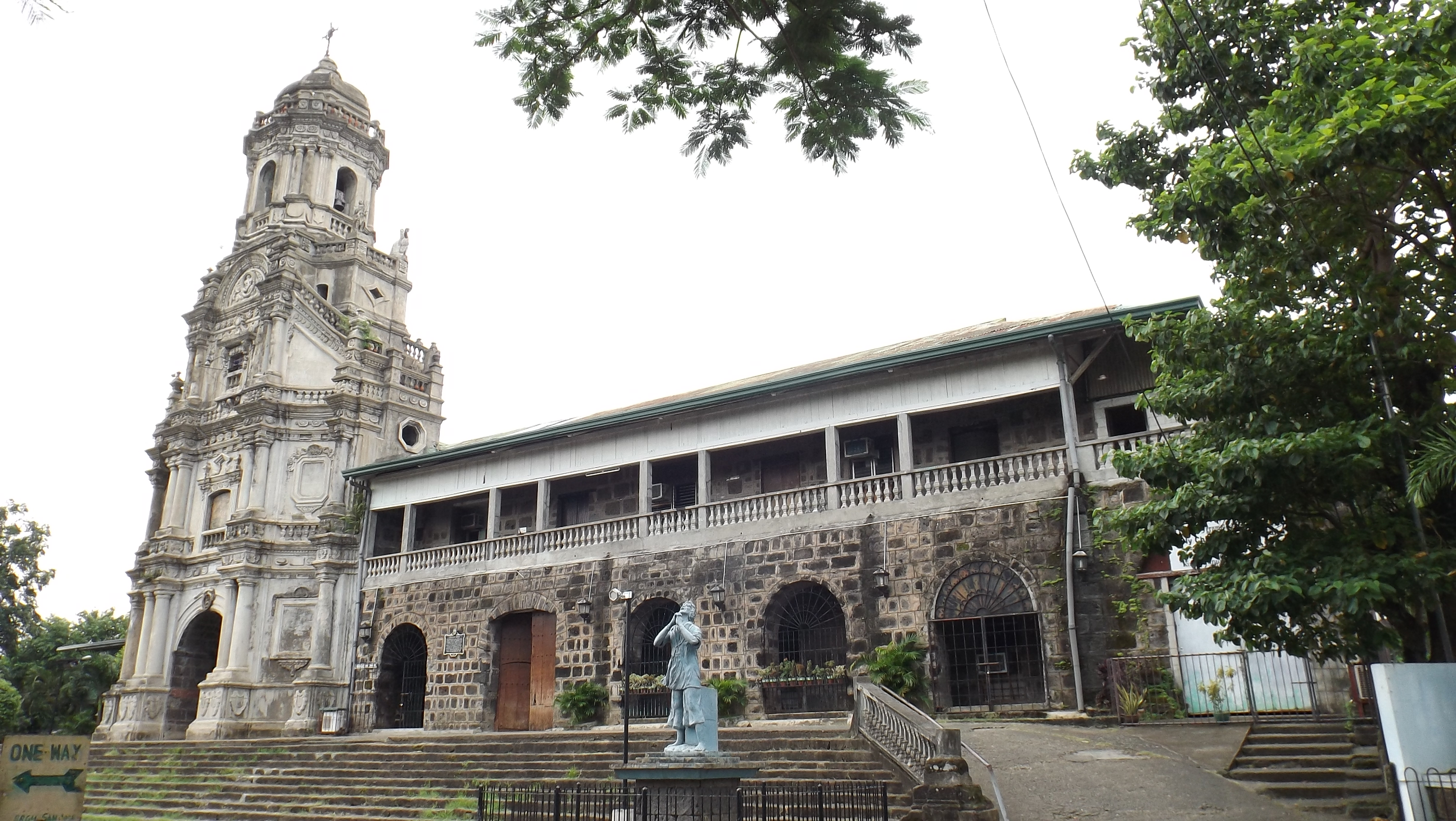
Church convent with the statue of St. Jerome in front

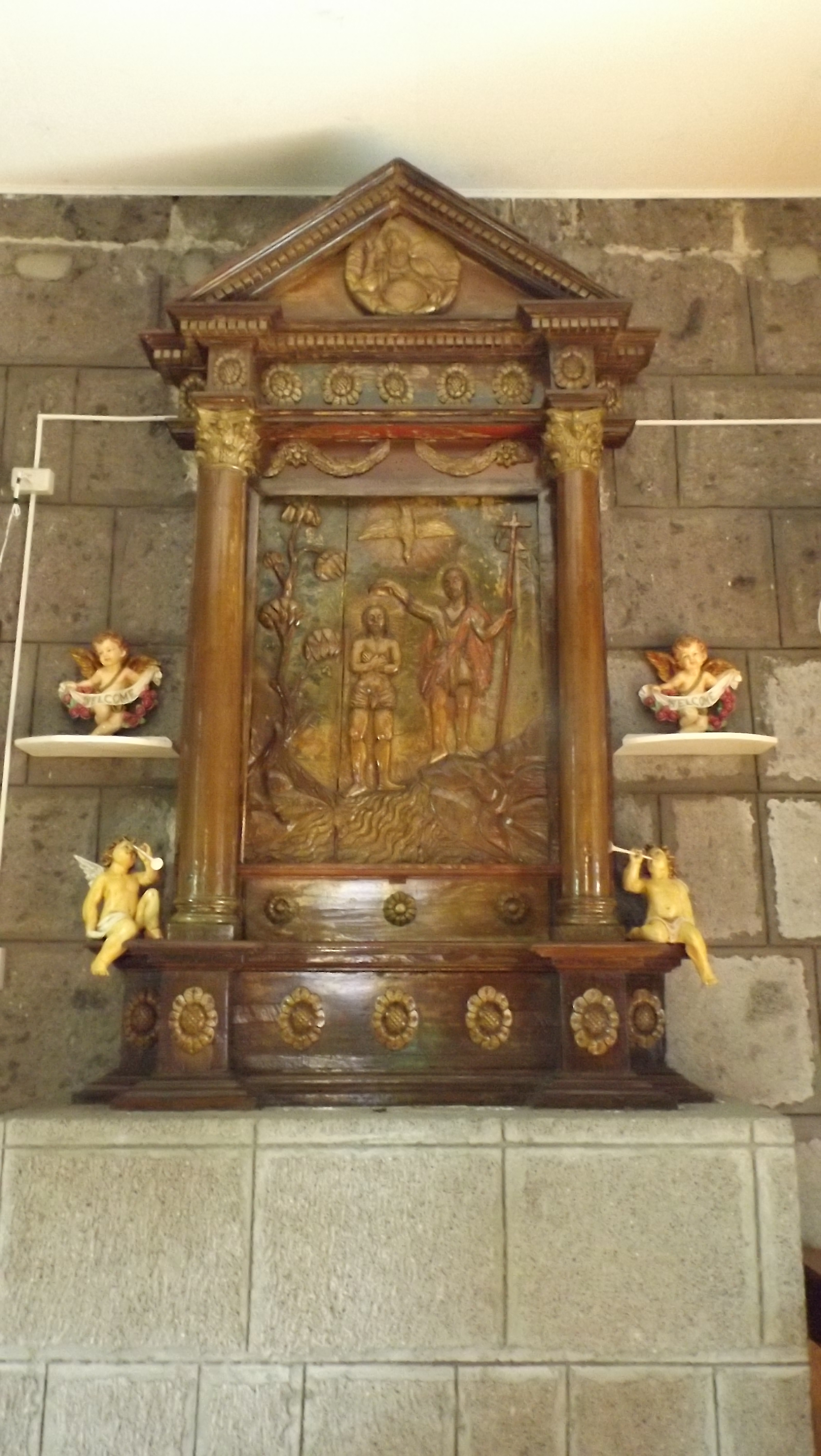
Altar inside the Adoration Chapel

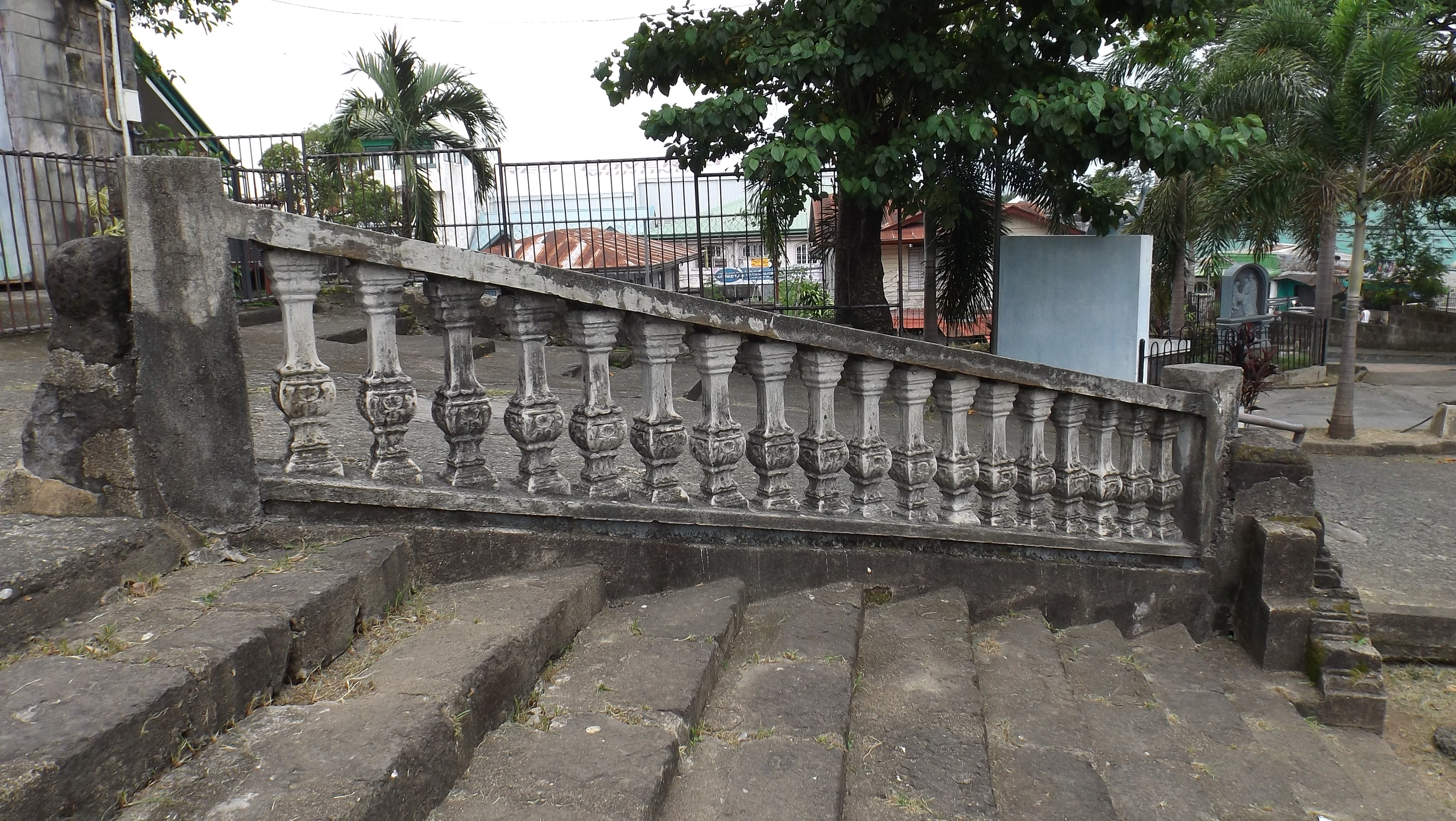
Stairway to the church

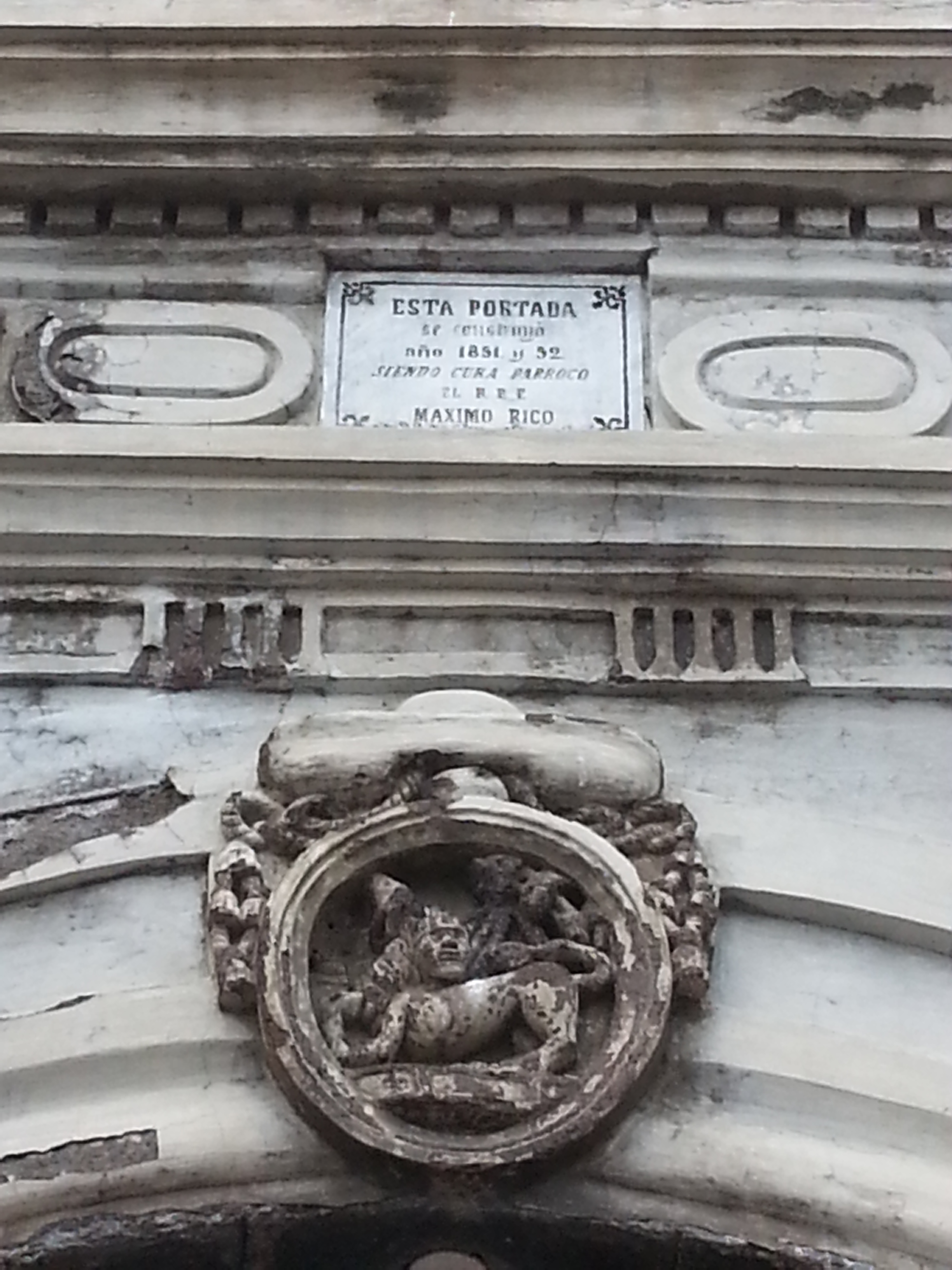
Details of sculpture on top of the main arch portal

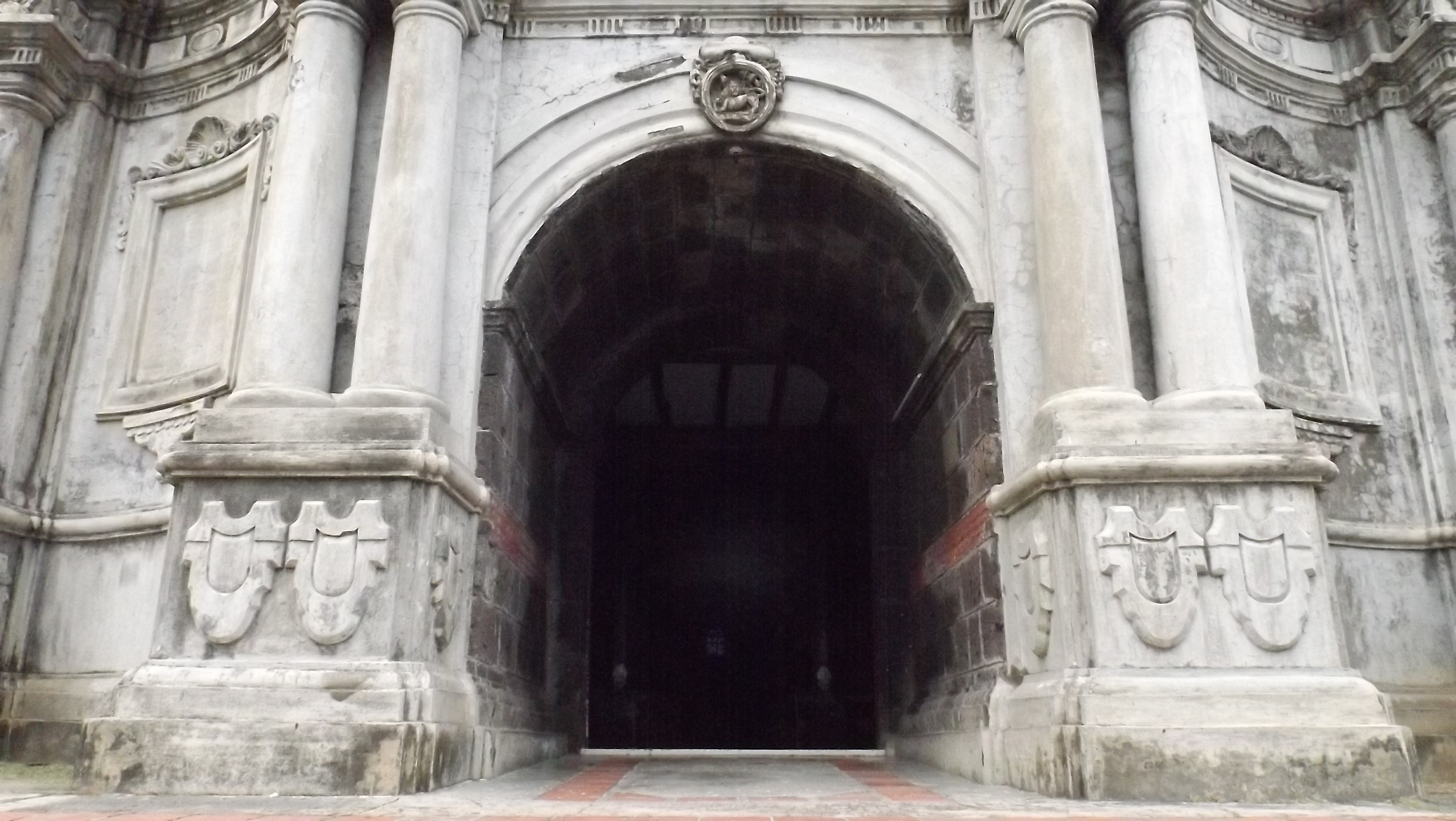
Main arch portal

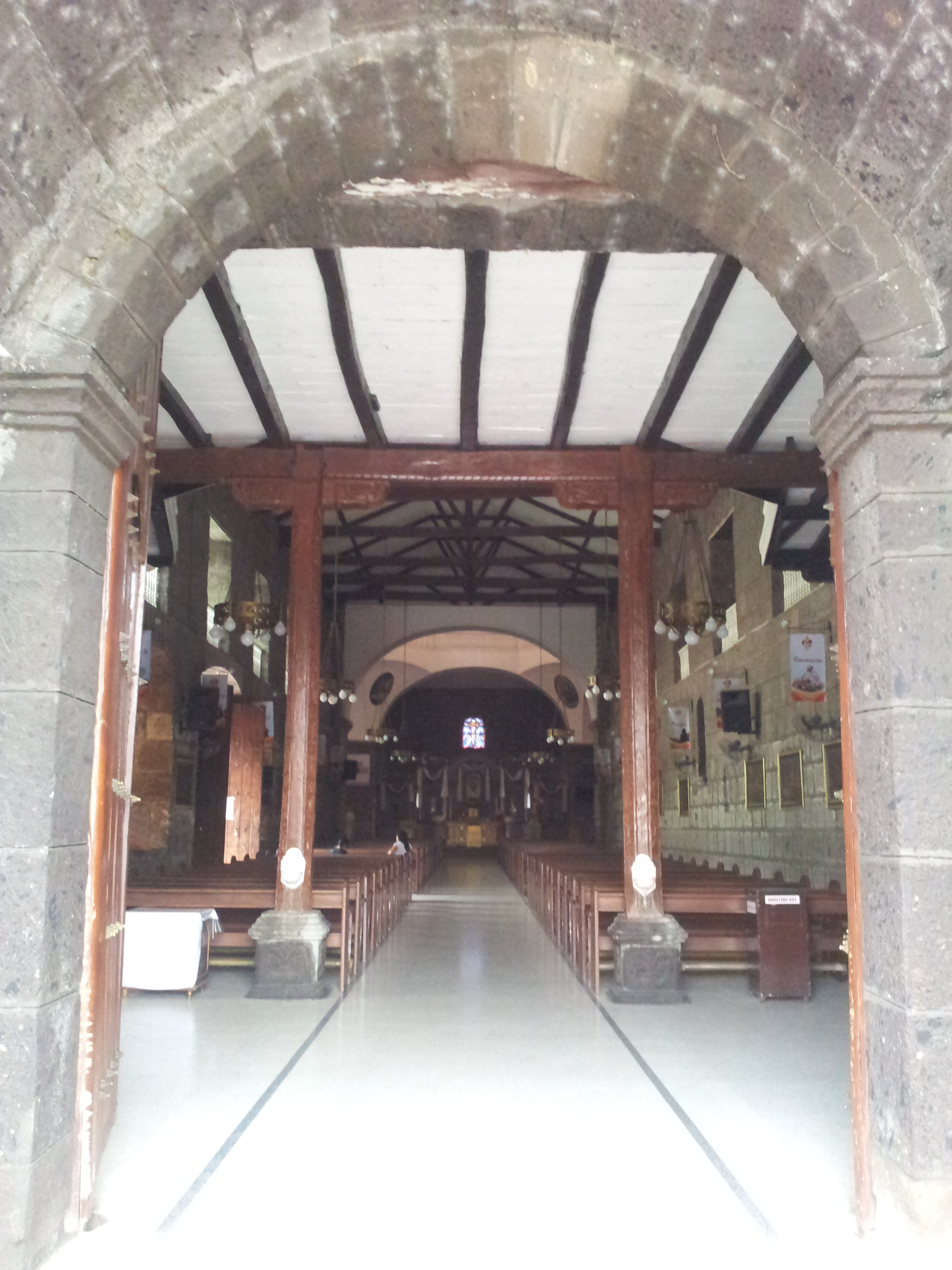
Narthex

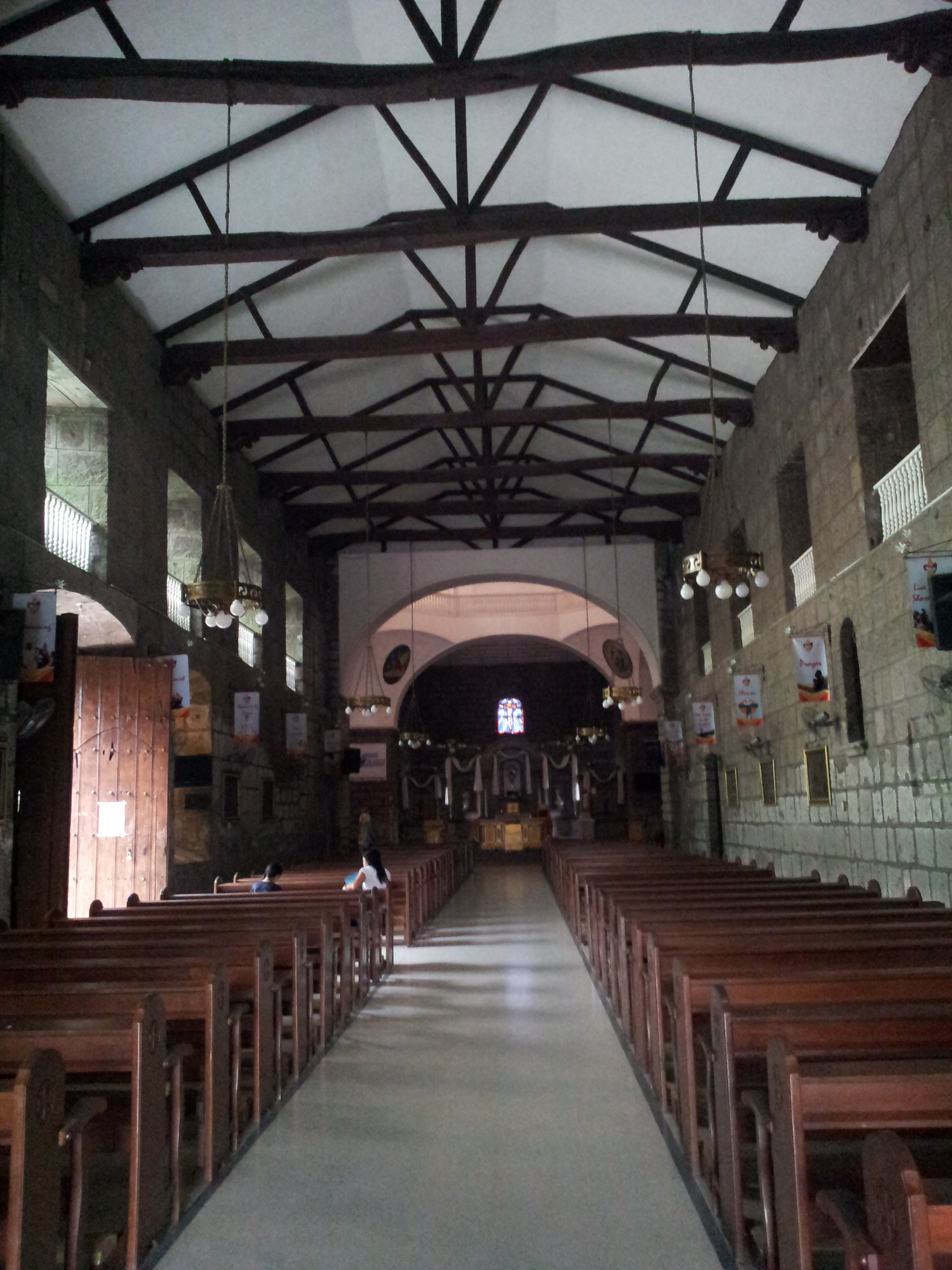
Church interior

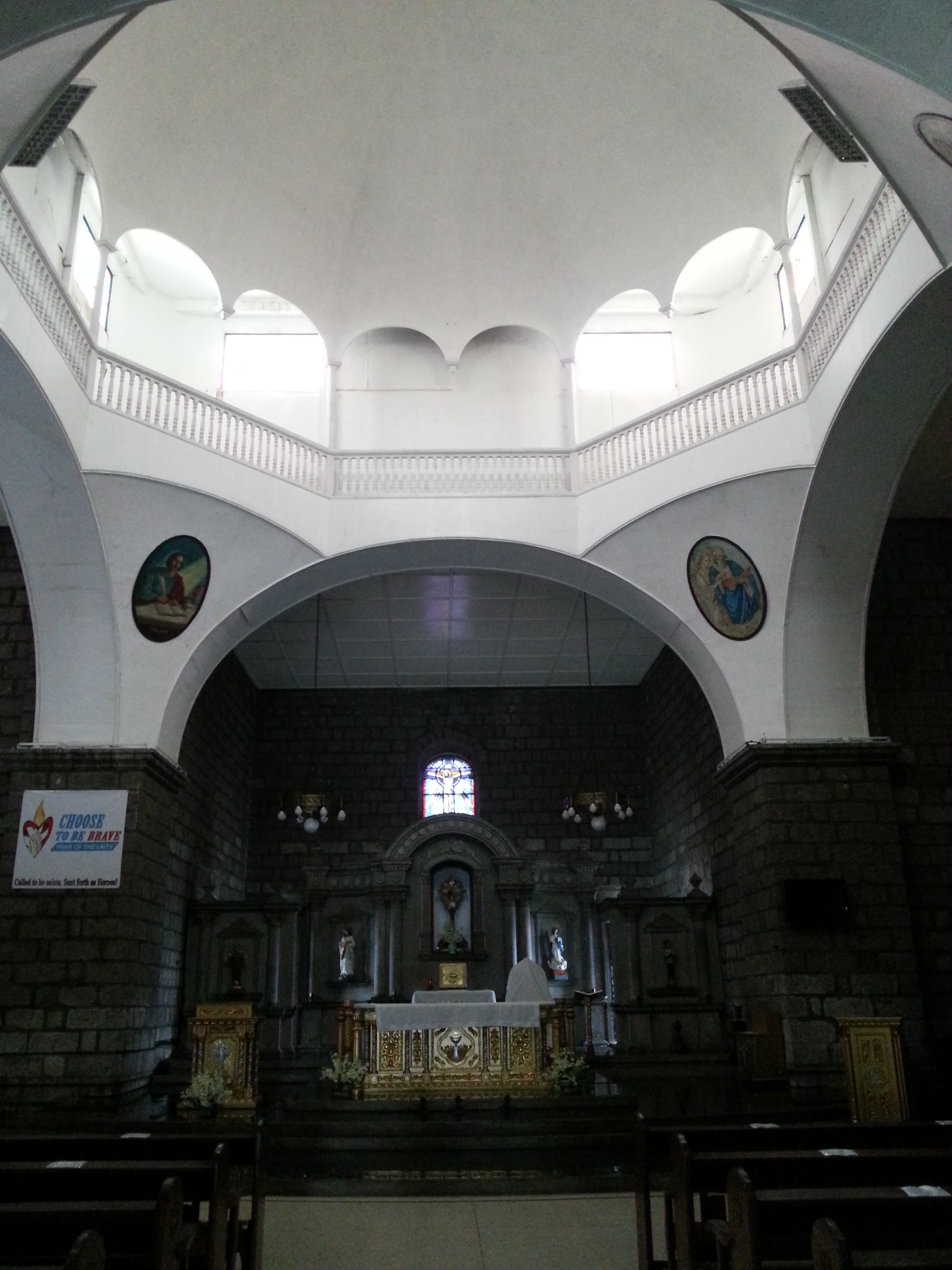
Paintings of the Holy Evangelists at the posts of the dome

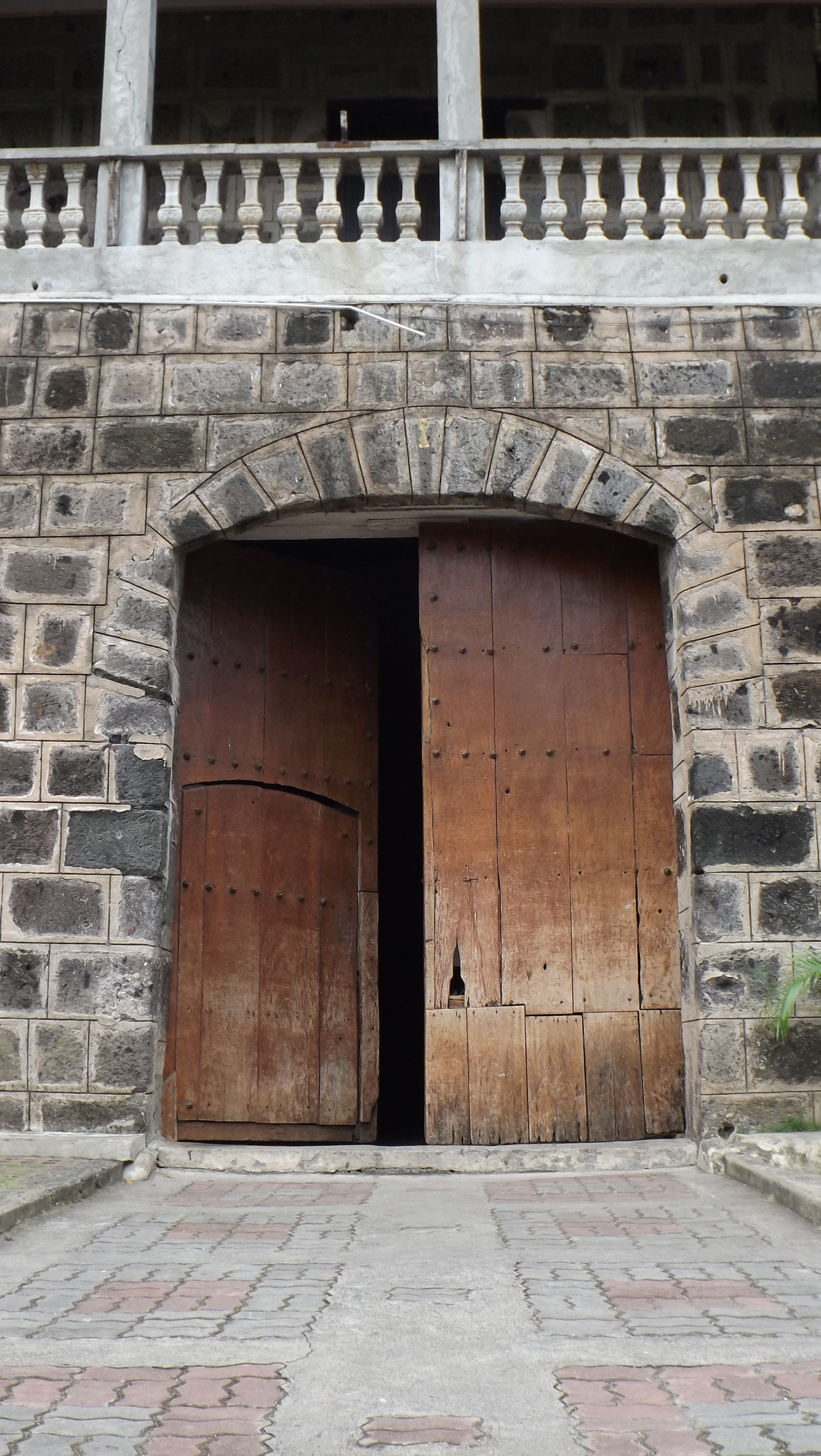
Wooden church door

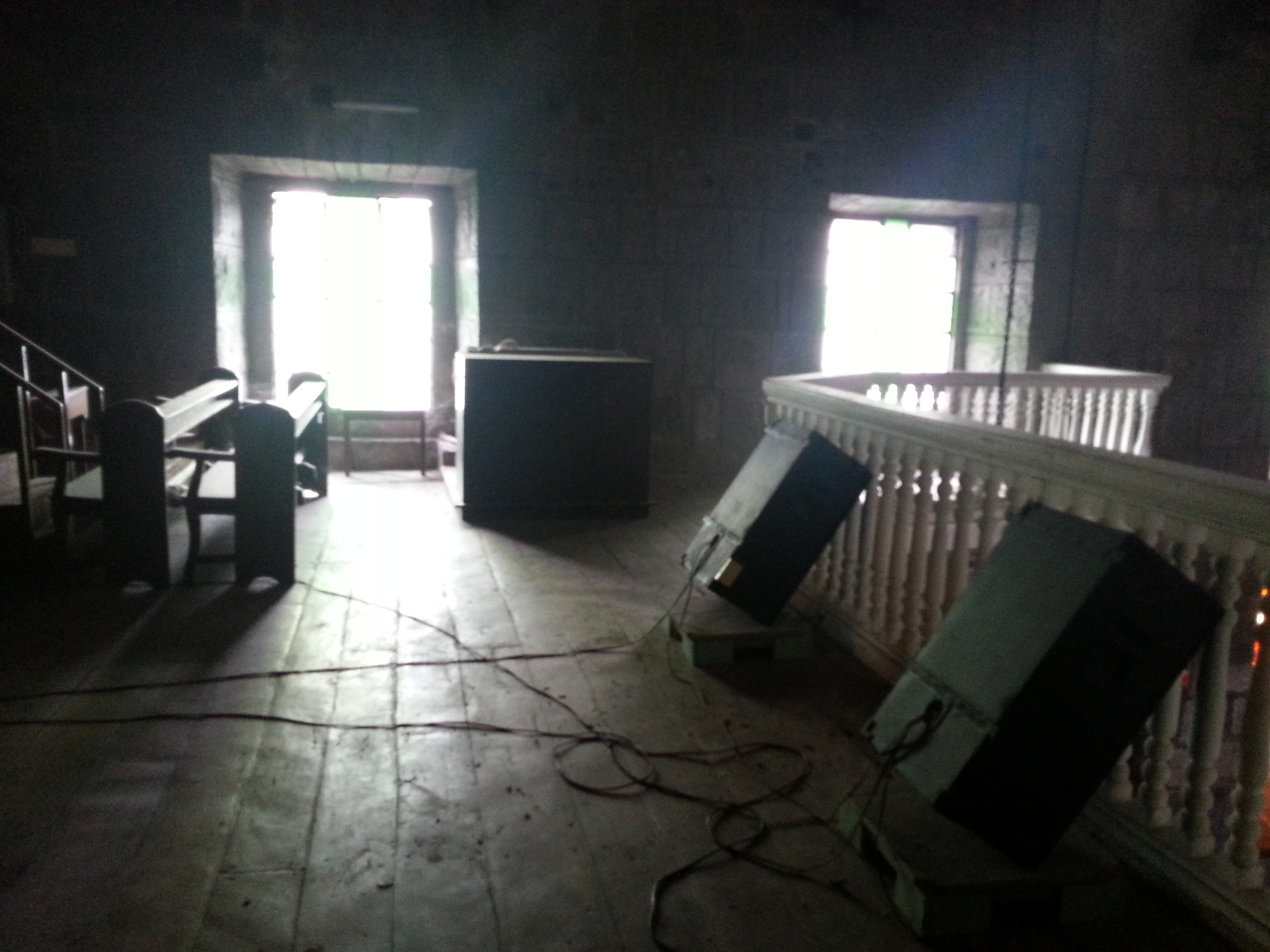
Choir loft

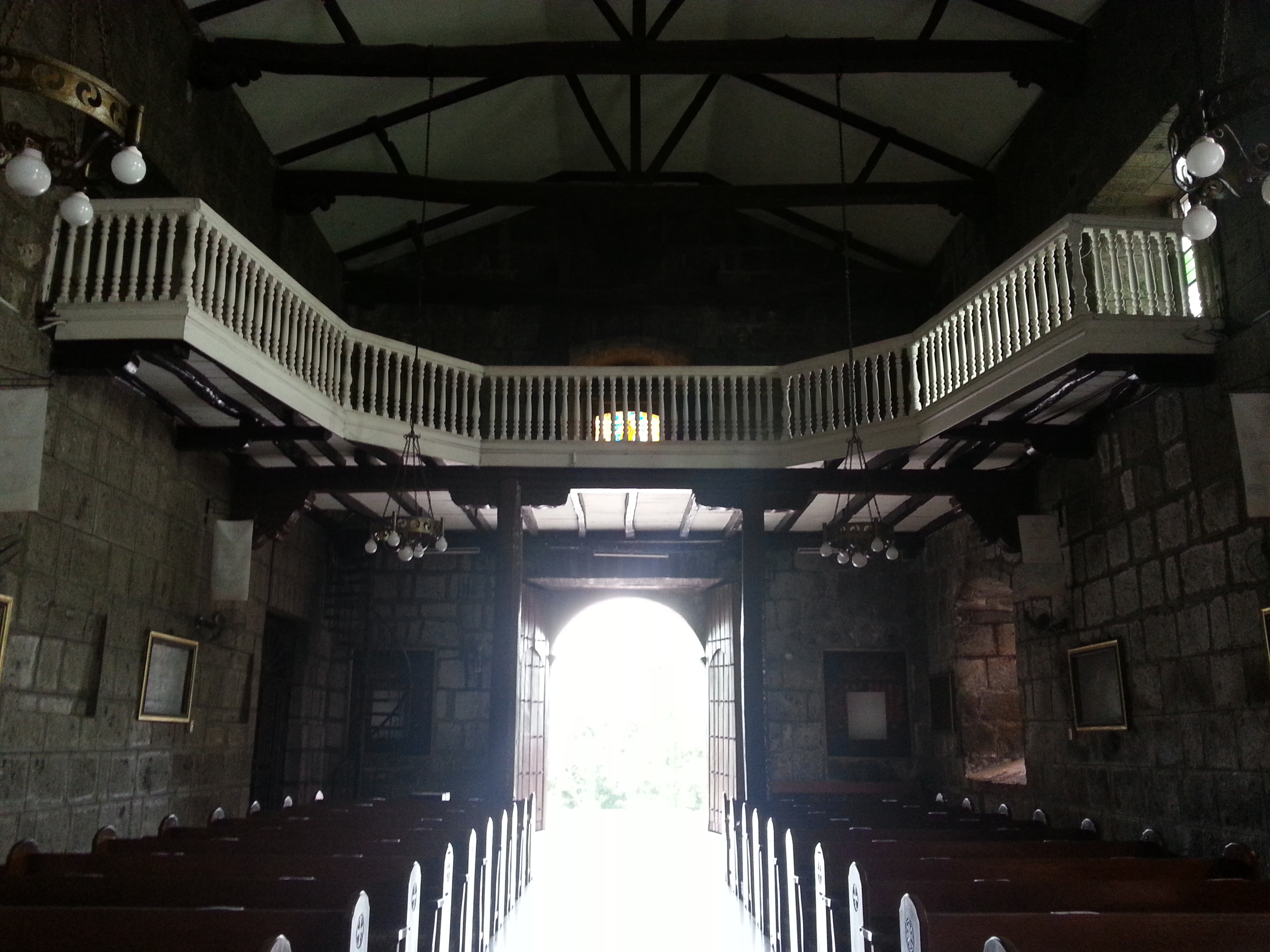
Narthex and choir loft

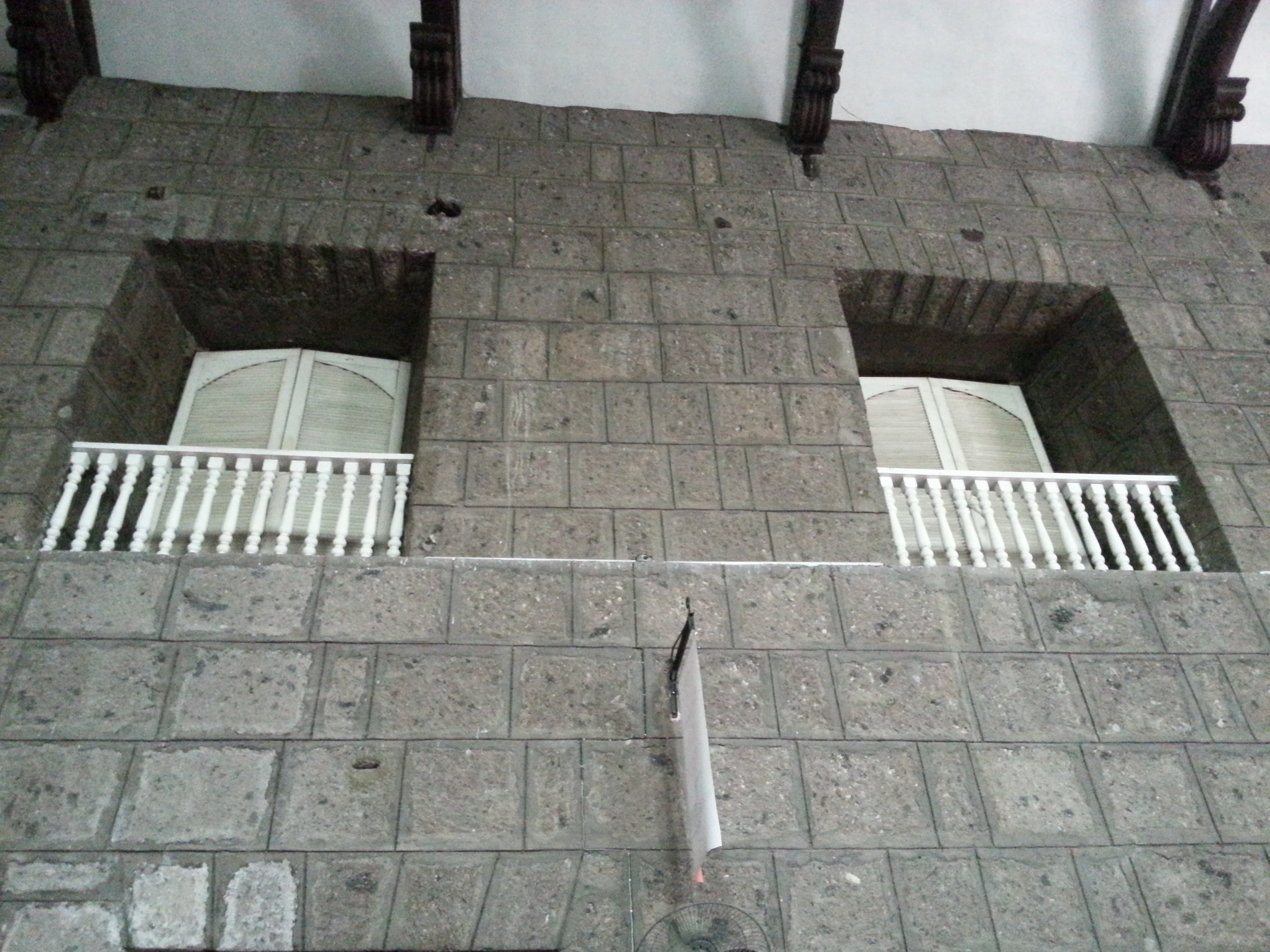
Windows at the upper part of the interior wall

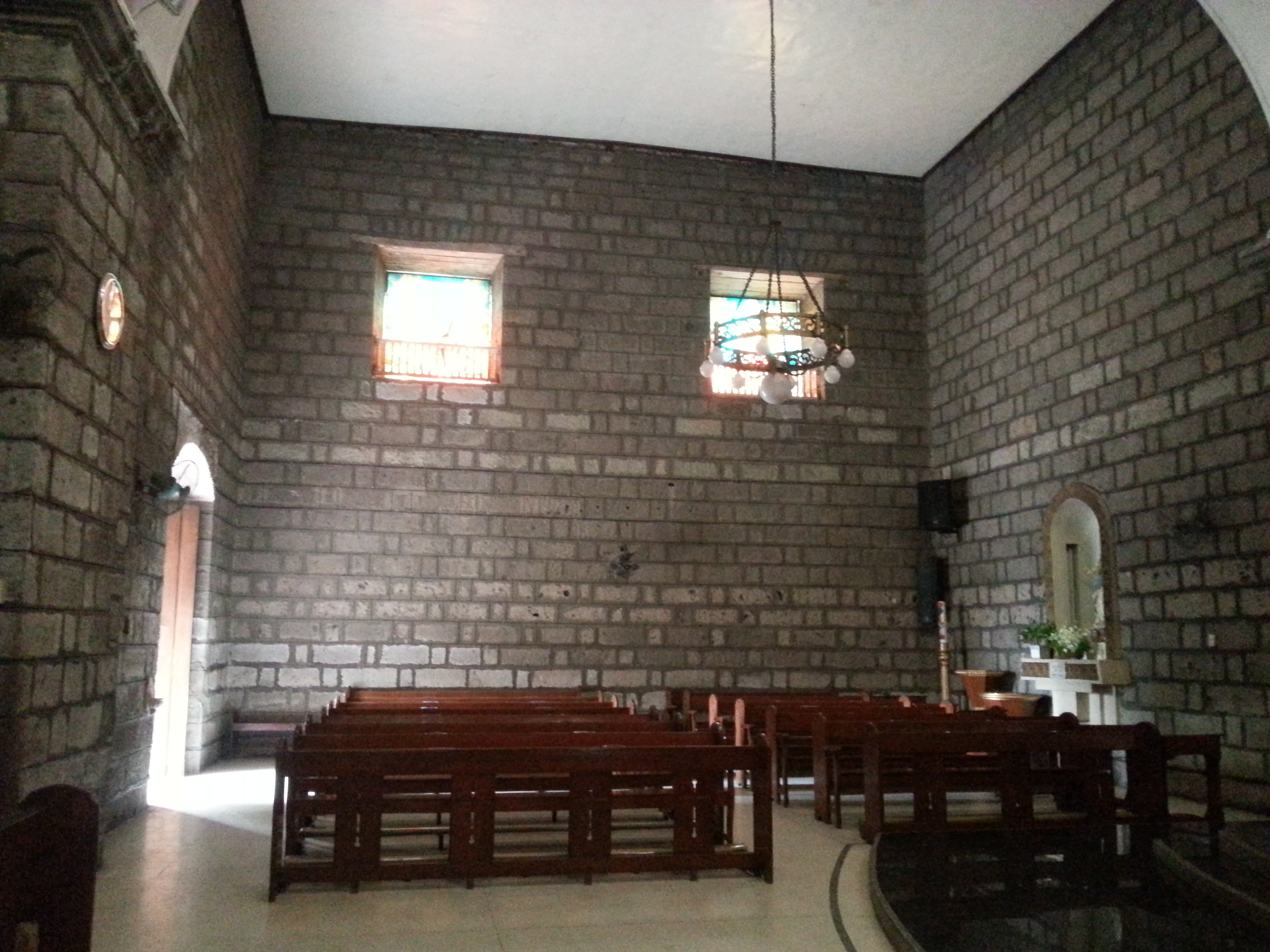
Left transept

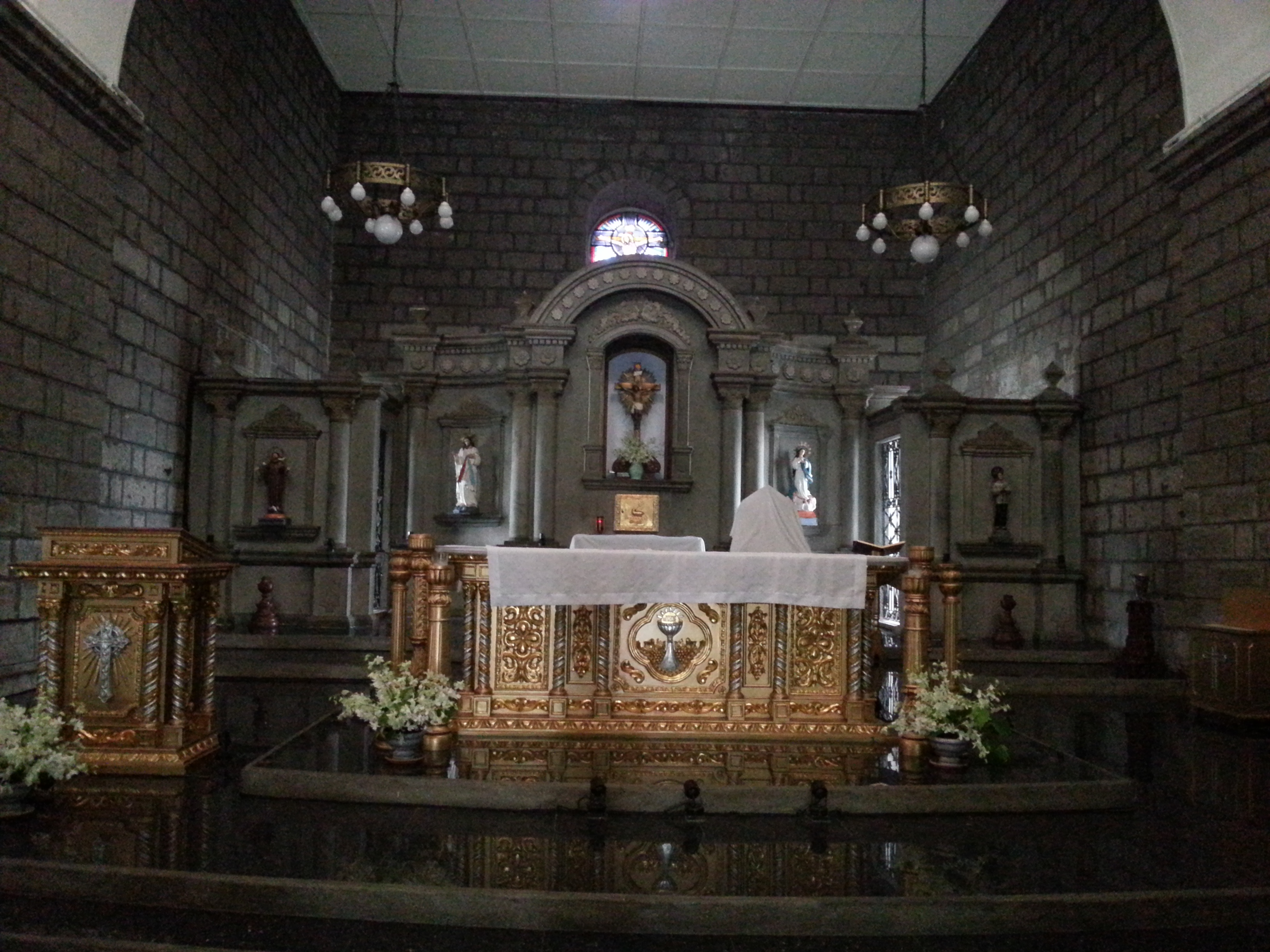
Main altar

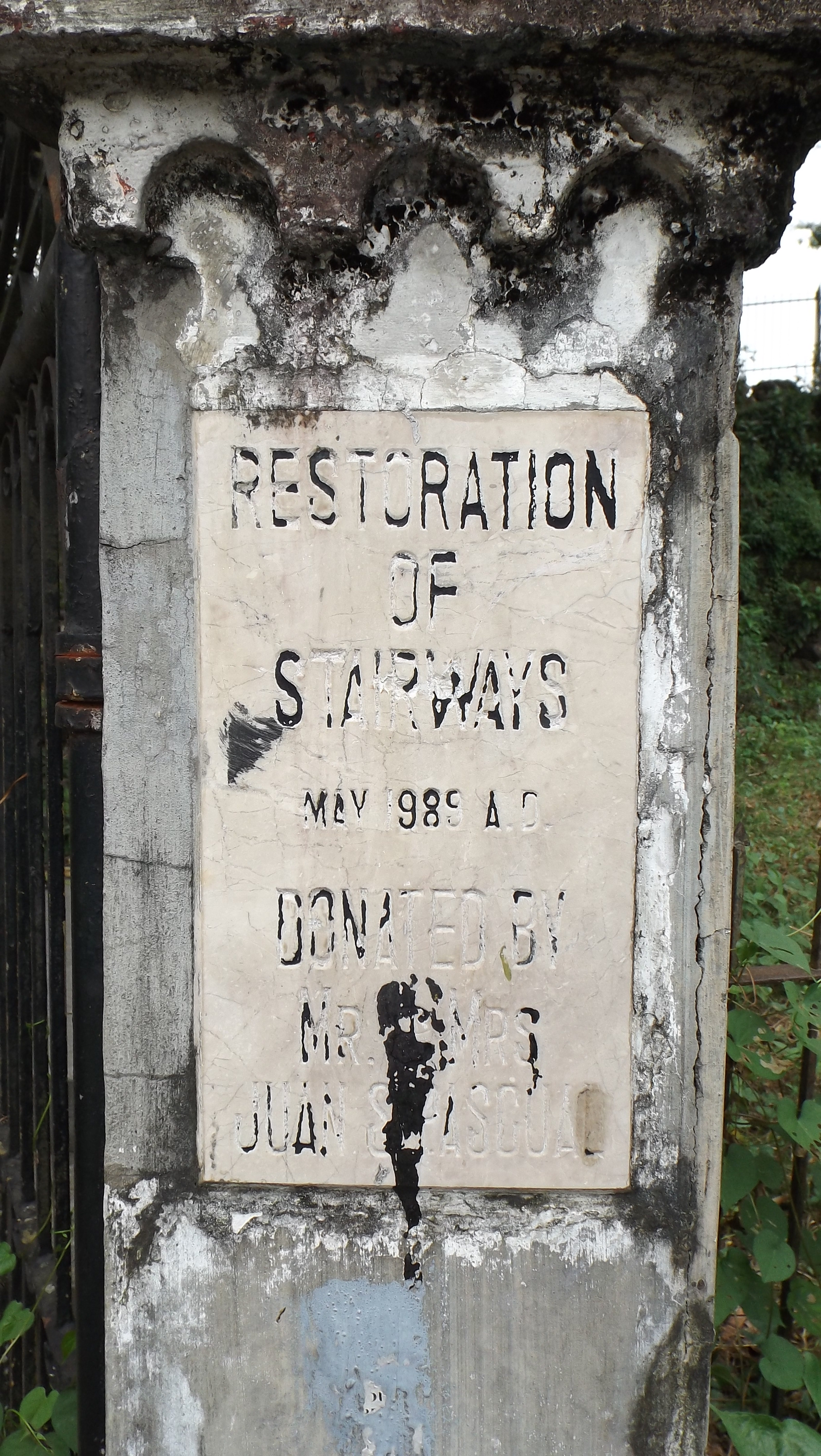
A 1985 marker of the restoration of the stairways to the churchyard
