= Glenda Dela Cruz =

Filipino businesswoman (born 1997)

- Dela Cruz in 2026
- Born: Glenda Dela Cruz; February 14, 1997 (age 29); Morong, Rizal, Philippines
- Other name: Miss Glenda
- Occupations: Businesswoman; content creator
- Title: Chief executive officer of Brilliant Skin Essentials
- Spouse: Mac Victorio (separated)
- Children: 2

Instagram information
- Page: Miss Glenda
- Followers: 454 thousand

TikTok information
- Page: iammissglenda
- Genre: Everyday life
- Followers: 4 million
- Last updated: November 3, 2026

Glenda Dela Cruz (born February 14, 1997), also known as Miss Glenda, is a Filipino businesswoman and social media personality. She is the founder and chief executive officer of Brilliant Skin Essentials, a Philippine beauty and skincare company established in 2016. Dela Cruz received several business and entrepreneurship awards, including the CEO of the Year award at the 2021 Asia Leaders Awards and Entrepreneur of the Year at the 2024 VP Choice Awards by Village Pipol.

== Early life and career ==
Dela Cruz grew up in Morong, Rizal, where she was raised by her grandmother after her father died and her mother left when she was two years old. At 12, she became the family's breadwinner and started working to be able to support them. Dela Cruz also joined local beauty pageants in her barangay. In 2017, she auditioned for ABS-CBN's reality show Pinoy Big Brother but was not selected as a housemate.

Dela Cruz worked as a virtual assistant, but lost the job after her employer discovered that she was underage. Drawing on her experience with acne and interest in skincare, she researched beauty products and their manufacture before establishing Brilliant Skin Essentials in 2016.

== Brilliant Skin Essentials ==
Brilliant Skin Essentials logo

Dela Cruz founded Brilliant Skin Essentials in 2016. The company's early products included Black Glamour Soap and the B.S.E. Rejuvenating Facial Set. She took part in the company's early operations, including product manufacturing, packaging, and marketing. In 2019, she visited Malaysia to meet with Brilliant Skin Essentials' local franchise network. Dela Cruz expanded the brand's promotional activities by engaging celebrity endorsers, including Andrea Brillantes, Arci Muñoz, Paulo Avelino, Alden Richards, and Kim Chiu. In an interview with the Philippine Daily Inquirer, she recalled that she began hiring celebrity endorsers during the company's third year of operation. She also used her social media accounts, particularly TikTok, to promote Brilliant Skin Essentials by sharing her personal experiences and appearing in promotional videos.

In 2020, Brilliant Skin Essentials recorded 46 authorized franchisees and 705 authorized distributors. In an interview with Philippine Entertainment Portal, Dela Cruz said that Brilliant Skin Essentials operated two factories, one in Bulacan and another in Morong, Rizal, where production staff followed COVID-19 safety protocols.

On February 7, 2023, Dela Cruz organized the "#Pinakamakinang" thanksgiving concert for Brilliant Skin Essentials at the Smart Araneta Coliseum. The free-admission event was the company's first concert since 2019. Its performers included Alden Richards, Jona, Morissette, Adie, Mayonnaise, Kamikazee, Bamboo, Seth Fedelin, Jillian Ward, Zeinab Harake and Andrea Brillantes. On December 21, Dela Cruz hosted the Brilliant Awards: Brightest of All Time at the Newport Performing Arts Theater. Franchisees and distributors from different parts of the Philippines attended the event. She delivered the opening speech, while television hosts Luis Manzano and Mariel Rodriguez hosted the ceremony. She also presented the Top Regional Franchisee awards alongside Alden Richards, who was introduced as the ambassador of Brilliant Skin Essentials. The event featured performances by 4th Impact, Andrea Brillantes, Kean Cipriano, Juan Karlos Labajo and other Filipino entertainers.

In 2024, Dela Cruz announced plans to expand her business interests into hospitality, manufacturing, construction, health care, petroleum, and real estate. She also outlined plans to introduce Brilliant Skin Essentials to the Indonesian market and pursue real estate development in Dubai. On May 21, Brilliant Skin Essentials received the Sunscreen Brand of the Year award at the 5th VP Choice Awards.

In May 2025, Brilliant Skin Essentials Inc. received two awards at the 6th Village Pipol Choice Awards: Sunscreen Brand of the Year and Breakthrough Brand of the Year.

In March 2026, the municipality of Morong, Rizal, named Brilliant Skin Essentials as the 2025 Top Employer of the Year. The company also received recognition as a Top 3 Outstanding Business Taxpayer and a Top 4 Highest Real Property Taxpayer in the municipality. According to Dela Cruz, Brilliant Skin Essentials employed more than 1,000 people and had thousands of franchisees and distributors across the Philippines.

== Other activities ==
Aside from her work in the beauty industry, Dela Cruz has participated in other business and media activities. She has supported charitable causes and organizations, including the CRIBS Foundation, Kanlungan Ni Maria, Saving Abused and Neglected Animals, and Bahay Aurora. In June 2023, she was named the first Filipino ambassador of TikTok Shop in the Philippines.

In 2024, Dela Cruz joined the tenth season of the business reality show The Final Pitch: Philippines as an investor-judge.

== Awards and recognition ==
Award	Year	Category	Recipient(s)	Result	Ref.
Gawad Award Amerika	2018	Youngest Filipino CEO in the Field of Cosmetics and Skin Care	Glenda Dela Cruz	Won	
Asia Leaders Awards	2021	CEO of the Year – Health and Wellness	Glenda Dela Cruz	Won	
The Inspiring Women Excellence Awards	2024	Excellence Award	Glenda Dela Cruz	Won	
VP Choice Awards	2024	Entrepreneur of the Year	Glenda Dela Cruz	Won	
VP Choice Awards	2025	Entrepreneur of the Year	Glenda Dela Cruz	Nominated	
VP Choice Awards	2026	Headliner of the Year for Business	Glenda Dela Cruz	Won	

== Personal life ==
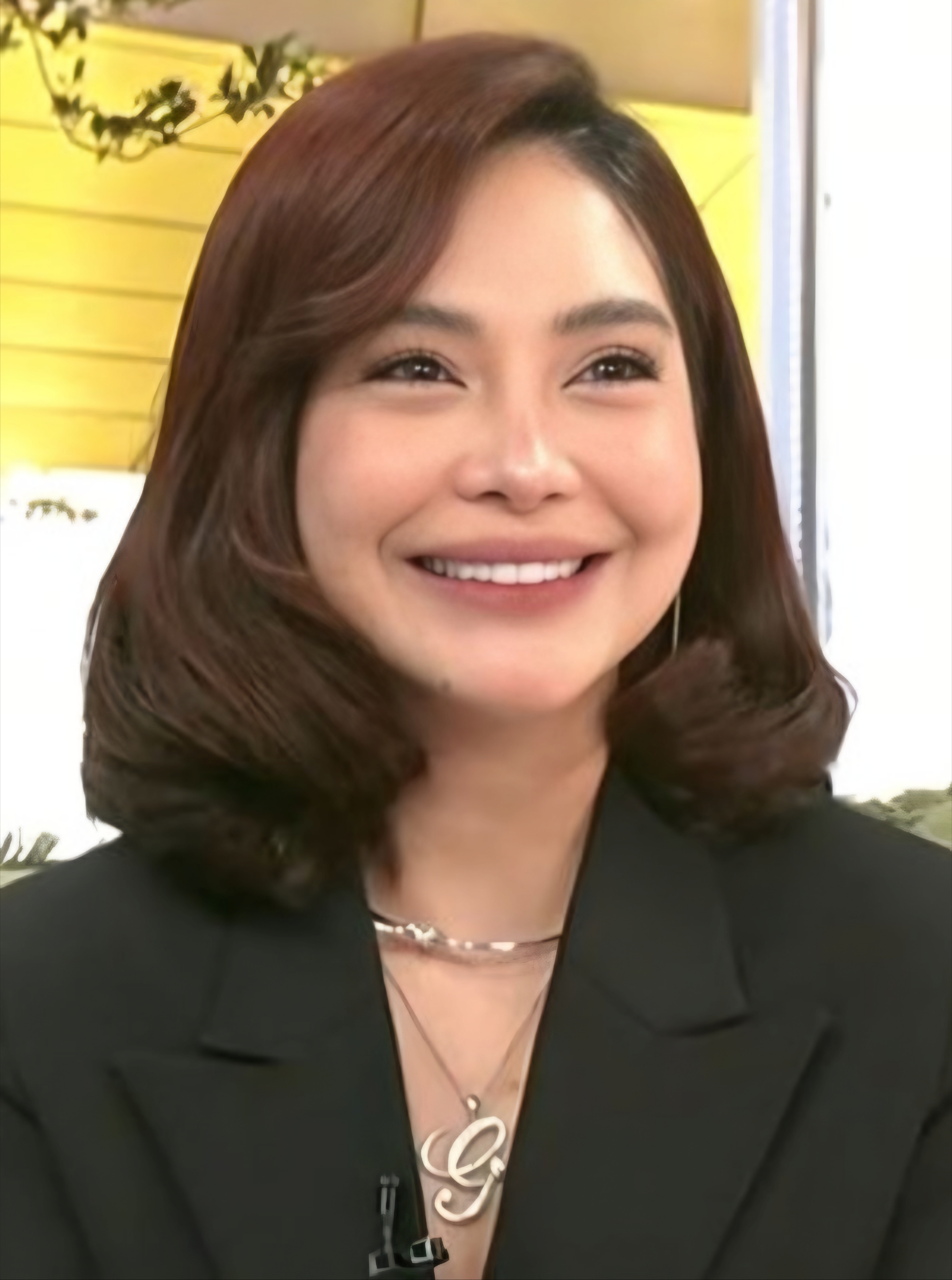
Dela Cruz in 2026

Dela Cruz was married to Mac Victorio, with whom she has two sons. She confirmed their separation in January 2023. In 2020, she and her family tested positive for COVID-19. According to Dela Cruz, she was hospitalized after suffering a stroke and pneumonia. In an interview, she later spoke about her experiences in the Intensive care unit.

In 2022, Dela Cruz filed complaints for cyber libel and unjust vexation against vlogger Rosmar Tan at the Quezon City Prosecutor's Office. She alleged that Tan's online posts had affected her and her family.

In 2026, Dela Cruz completed her third executive education program at Harvard Business School (HBS).

== Filmography ==
=== Television ===
Year	Title	Role	Ref.
2024	The Final Pitch: Philippines (season 10)	Judge	
2025	Rated Korina	Herself	
