= Ambrosio Flores =

Filipino politician

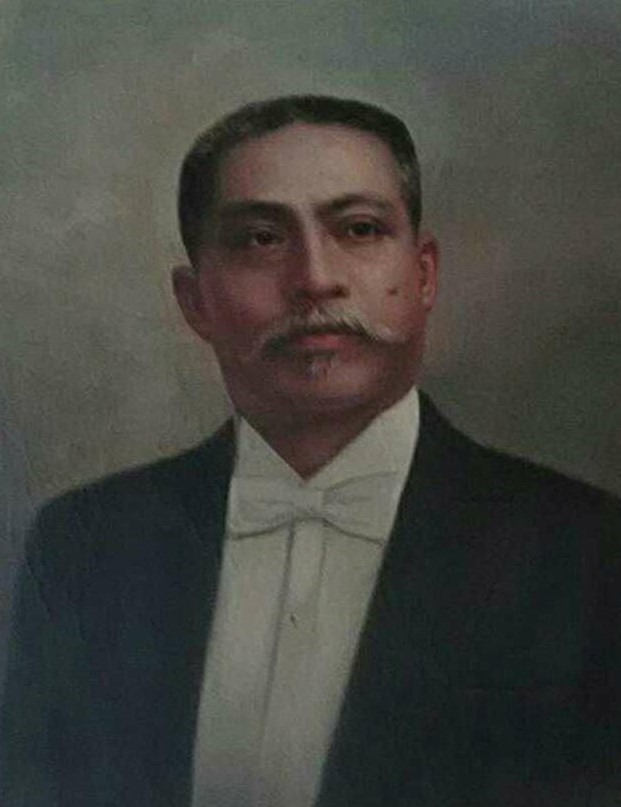

Governor of Rizal
- In office June 11, 1901 – March 6, 1904
- Preceded by: Position established
- Succeeded by: Arturo Dancel

Governor of Manila
- In office August 10, 1898 – February 4, 1899

Supreme Commander Philippine Revolutionary Army
- In office June 6, 1899 – June 9, 1899
- President: Emilio Aguinaldo
- Preceded by: Lieutenant General Antonio Luna
- Succeeded by: Generalissimo Emilio Aguinaldo

Assistant Secretary of War and Chief of General Staff
- In office August 1898 – June 1899
- President: Emilio Aguinaldo
- Preceded by: Antonio Luna
- Succeeded by: Venancio Concepcion

Member of the Malolos Congress from Batangas
- In office September 15, 1898 – November 13, 1899 Serving with Mariano Lopez, Gregorio Aguilera and Eduardo Gutierrez

Personal details
- Born: March 20, 1843 Manila, Captaincy General of the Philippines
- Died: June 24, 1912 (aged 69) Pasig, Rizal, Philippine Islands
- Party: Federalista Party
- Education: University of Santo Tomas
- Occupation: Soldier, writer, politician
- Profession: Lawyer

Military service
- Allegiance: First Philippine Republic
- Branch/service: Philippine Revolutionary Army; Spanish Army
- Years of service: 1896–1900 (Philippines); 1860–1896 (Spain)
- Rank: Brigadier General (Philippine Revolutionary Army); First Lieutenant (Spanish Army)
- Battles/wars: Philippine Revolution; Philippine–American War

Ambrosio Flores y Flores (March 20, 1843 – June 24, 1912) was a Filipino general in the Philippine Revolution and the first governor of the province of Rizal.

== Biography ==
Ambrosio Flores was born on March 20, 1843, in Manila, the capital of the Philippine Islands. His parents were Ignacio Flores, a corporal in the Spanish army, and Josefa Flores. He studied Latin with Fr. Esteban del Rosario, as his private tutor, in Ternate, Cavite. He later studied philosophy at the University of Santo Tomas. After some time, he changed his studies and went to study medicine.

On May 12, 1860, following his father's career, he enlisted in the Spanish army in the 9th Infantry Regiment of Isabel II where his father is a lieutenant. He was promoted to officer status on July 14, 1875. He served in Mindanao fighting the rebellious Muslims in the region. His military career for more than three decades included flag bearer of Jolo Regiment No. 6. He was also a defensor de oficio (lawyer for the defense) in military courts until 1894. He then held the rank of First Lieutenant. Soon after, he opened an elementary school in Quiapo, Manila.

Flores was active in the Progaganda Movement and in 1894 traveled through the country with Faustino Villareal to spread the work and ideas of José Rizal. Years earlier, he had become a Freemason because of his hatred of the abusive Spanish friars in the Philippine colony.

=== Masonry ===
Flores was exposed to the work carried out by masonic lodges under the Gran Oriente de España, which are mainly composed of Spanish military men. He was convinced that Masonry is the institution needed by the Filipinos at that time. So when Nilad Lodge No. 144, the first masonic lodge for Filipinos, was established in Manila, Flores was the first to join adopting Musa as his masonic name.

In April 1892, he became the first master of the lodge Solidaridad and in-charge of Bathala II. On April 16, 1893, he became the Grand Master of Grand Consejo Regional.

=== Philippine Revolution ===
When the Philippine Revolution broke out, Flores was arrested and held captive for 17 months. After his release, he joined the revolutionary troops and was appointed general. He became one of the confidants of Emilio Aguinaldo. He later resigned from the revolutionary army. On August 10, 1898, he was appointed governor of Manila Province. On September 8, 1898, Flores transferred the capital of Manila Province from Marikina to San Juan Del Monte. As governor of Manila, he made divisions of municipalities and later turned them into battalions in preparation of the war against the Americans. He held his position as governor of Manila Province until February 4, 1899.

Shortly afterwards, he was again drafted into the revolutionary army and made a brigadier general. Flores fought in the battles of Polo and Calumpit in Bulacan. After the death of General Antonio Luna, Flores became Commander in Chief of the Philippine Army and Secretary of War in the Philippine government of Aguinaldo. However, the U.S. military proved too strong for the Philippine troops. The victory of U.S. military forced Flores to go to Tarlac with the remnants of the revolutionary army and his family. In April 1899, Flores, Col. Manuel Arguelles, and Col. Florentino Torres went to U.S. Gen. Arthur MacArthur to ask for cessation of hostilities. They were interviewed by Gen. Elwell Otis.

He saw that further resistance was futile and in 1900, along with several other generals and leaders, including Francisco Macabulos and Pantaleon Garcia, surrendered to the Gen. MacArthur in Nueva Ecija.

=== Governorship of Rizal ===
In December 1900, along with Florentino Torres, T. H. Pardo de Tavera, Cayetano Arellano, Felipe Buencamino, and Benito Legarda among others, Flores co-founded the Federalista Party. He became the Director of the party, and headed its newspaper La Democracia. With the help of the party, Flores was appointed Governor of Rizal Province, then later elected for the same position.

While governor, which lasted until 1904, he was active in the "pacification" of the Philippines. The so-called "Ladrones" (revolutionaries who refused to surrender) were imprisoned during his term. This made Flores unpopular with the population as governor.

=== Later years and death ===
After his governorship, he completed a law degree and passed his entrance exam for the Philippine Bar at the age of 62. On July 1, 1911, he was appointed Justice of the Peace in Pasig. In May 1908, he organized the Silanganan Lodge No. 305 in Pasig, and became its first master. He was re-elected multiple times but his ill-health prevented him from serving for a fifth term. On June 24, 1912, Flores died aged 69.

== Sources ==
- Arsenio Manuel, Dictionary of Philippine Biography, Volume Three, Filipiniana Publications, Quezon City (1986)
- Carlos Quirino, Who's Who in Philippine History, Tahanan Books, Manila (1995)
- National Historical Institute, Filipinos in History, Vol. 1-3, Manila, NHI (1992)
- Hector K. Villaroel, Eminent Filipinos, Textbook Publishers, Quezon City (1965)
