= Governor of Rizal =

Local chief executive

- Gobernador ng Rizal
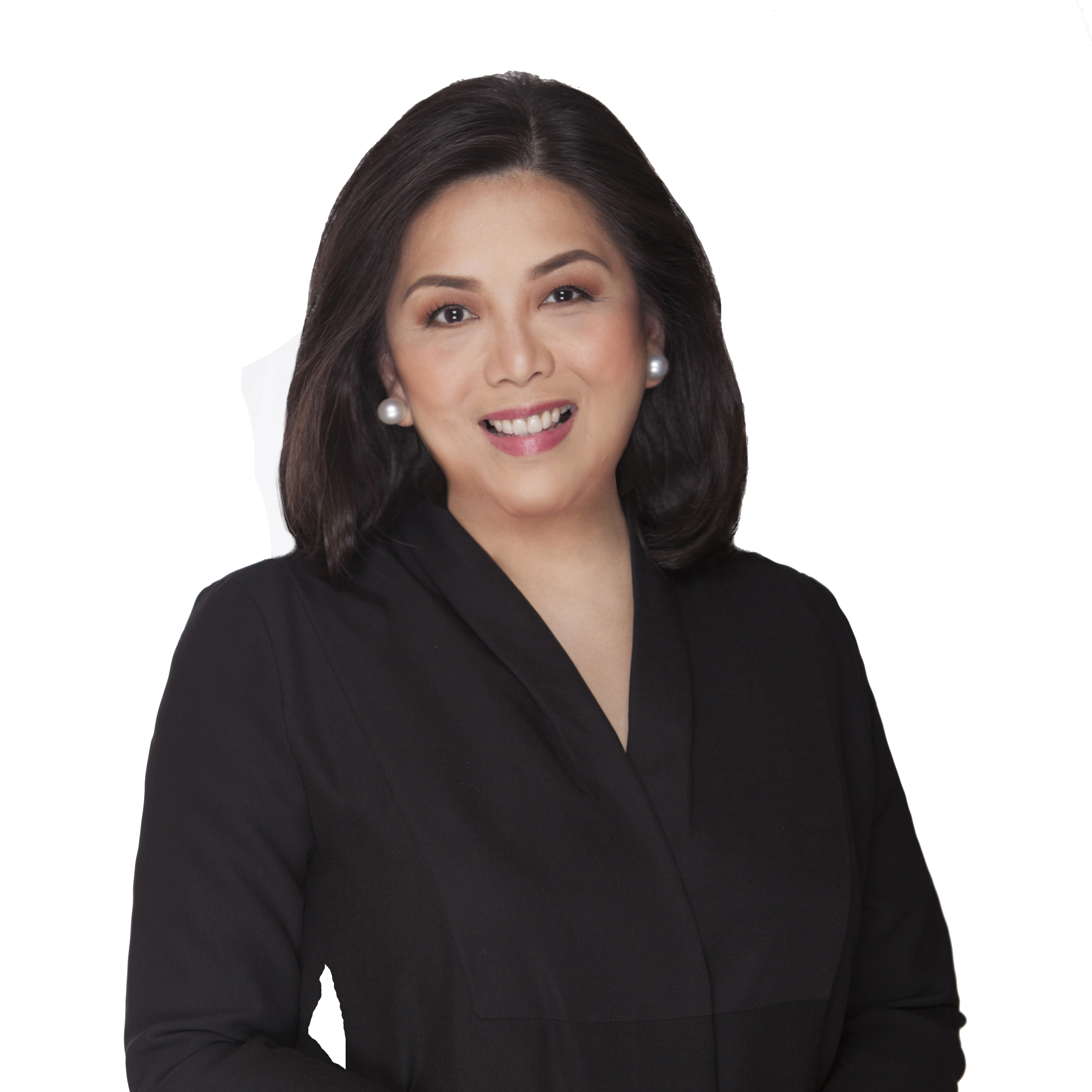
- Incumbent; Nina Ricci Ynares-Chiongbian since June 30, 2022
- Style: Honorable (formal); Mr./Madame Governor (informal)
- Residence: Rizal Provincial Hall (workplace)
- Term length: 3 years
- Inaugural holder: Ambrosio Flores
- Formation: 1901
- Website: Official Website of the Province of Rizal

The governor of Rizal is the local chief executive of the Philippine province of Rizal.

== List ==
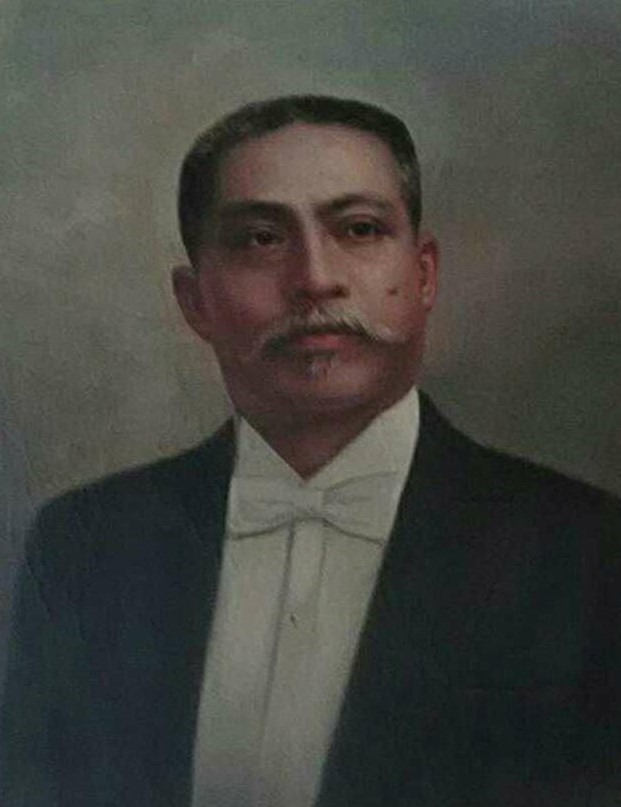
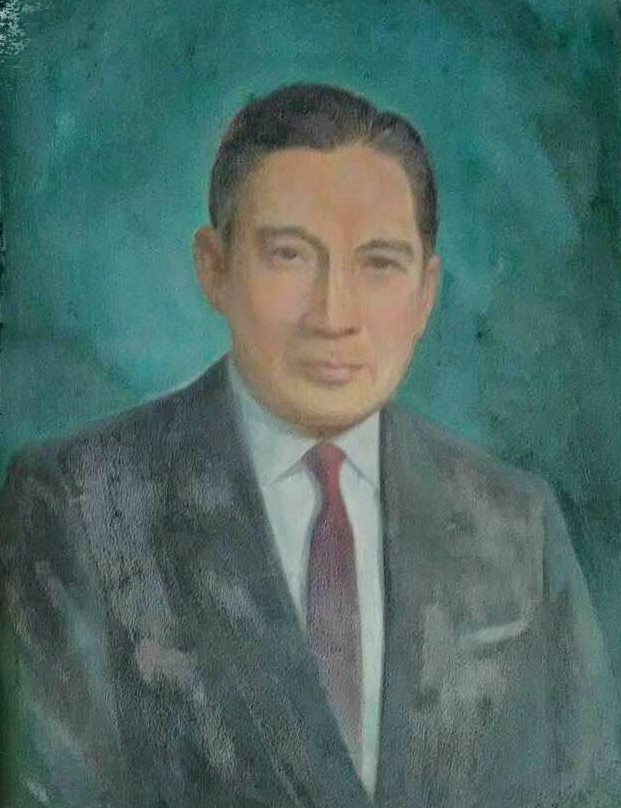
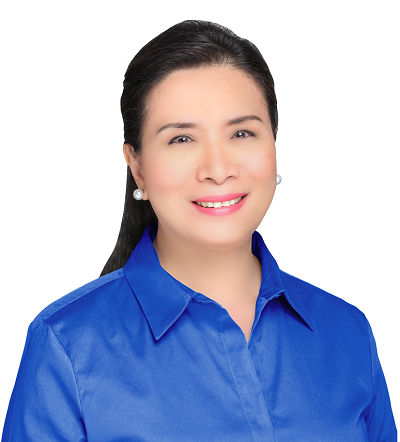
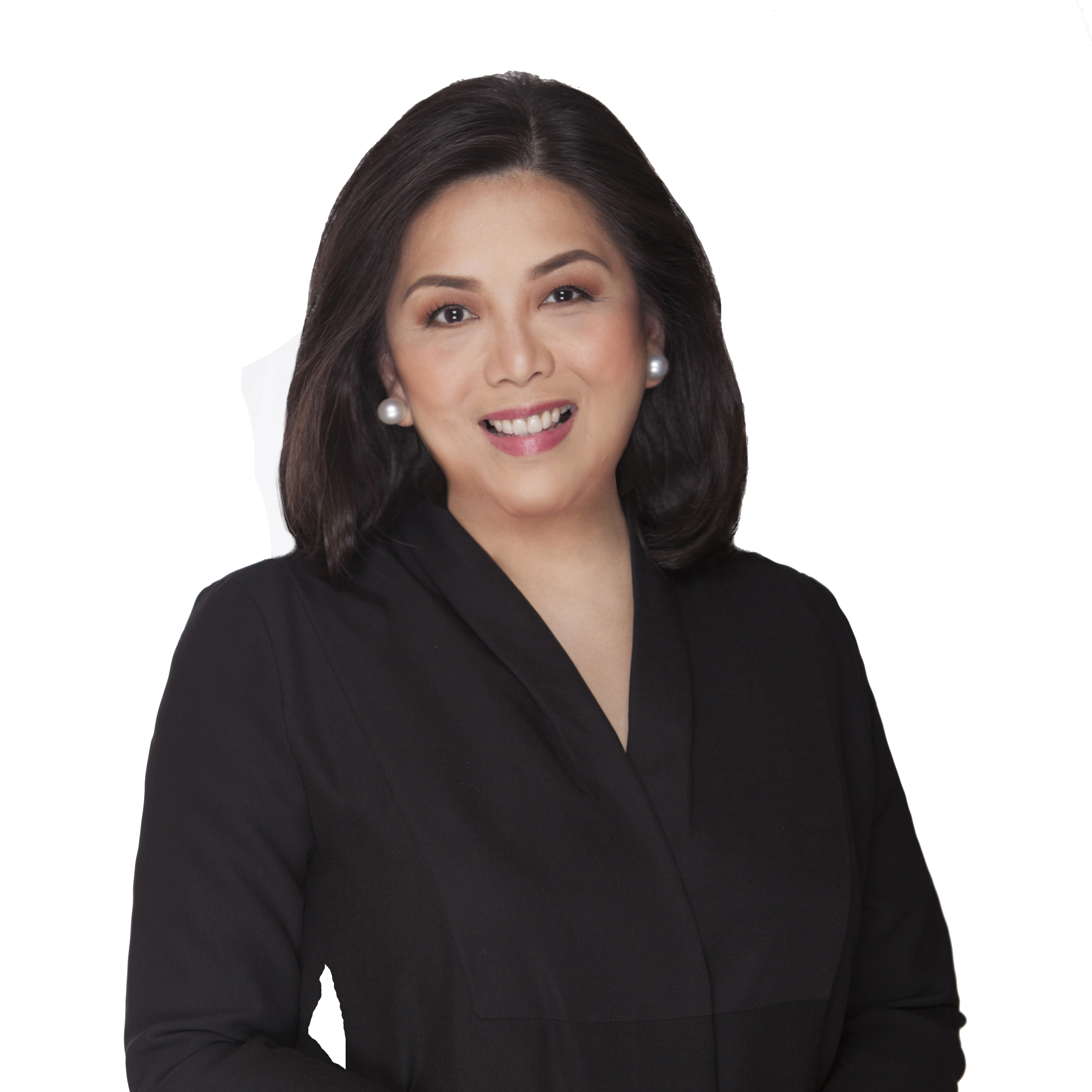
- Top left: Ambrosio Flores was the first governor of Rizal.
- Top right: Isidro Rodriguez was the longest serving governor.
- Bottom left: Rebecca Ynares was the first female governor.
- Bottom right: Nina Ynares is the current governor.

This is the list of governors of Rizal from its inception in 1901. The longest-serving governors are Isidro Rodriguez (who served from 1955 to 1986) and Rebecca Alcantara-Ynares (who served from 2001 to 2004 and from 2013 to 2022).

No.	Portrait	Governor Office (Note: Office before became/elected Governor.) (Lifespan)	Party	Term of office			Election	City/Municipality	Vice Governor	
No.	Portrait	Governor Office (Lifespan)	Party	start	end	duration	Election	City/Municipality	Vice Governor	
1		Ambrosio F. Flores; Representative of Batangas in the Malolos Congress (1843–1912)	Federalista	11 June 1901	06 March 1904	2 years, 269 days	—	Pasig (Manila)	None (11 June 1901–30 December 1959)	
1		Ambrosio F. Flores; Representative of Batangas in the Malolos Congress (1843–1912)	Federalista	11 June 1901	06 March 1904	2 years, 269 days	1902	Pasig (Manila)	None (11 June 1901–30 December 1959)	
2		Arturo P. Dancel; Representative of Mindoro in the Malolos Congress (1863–1915)	Federalista	07 March 1904	30 September 1907	3 years, 207 days	1904	Marikina	None (11 June 1901–30 December 1959)	
2		Arturo P. Dancel; Representative of Mindoro in the Malolos Congress (1863–1915)	Federalista	07 March 1904	30 September 1907	3 years, 207 days	1906	Marikina	None (11 June 1901–30 December 1959)	
3		Jose G. Tupas; Provincial Secretary of Rizal (1867–1938)	Progresista	01 October 1907	02 August 1909 (Note: Resigned to run for district representative of the second district.)	1 year, 305 days	— (Note: Appointed governor.)	Morong	None (11 June 1901–30 December 1959)	
3		Jose G. Tupas; Provincial Secretary of Rizal (1867–1938)	Progresista	01 October 1907	02 August 1909	1 year, 305 days	1907	Morong	None (11 June 1901–30 December 1959)	
4		Lope K. Santos; Writer (1879–1963)	Nacionalista	22 December 1909	15 October 1912	2 years, 298 days	1909	Pasig	None (11 June 1901–30 December 1959)	
5		Mariano C. Melendres; Lawyer (1881–1981)	Progresista	16 October 1912	15 October 1916	3 years, 365 days	1912	Pasig	None (11 June 1901–30 December 1959)	
6		Eulogio A. Rodriguez Sr. Municipal President of Montalban (1883–1964)	Progresista	16 October 1916	15 October 1919	2 years, 364 days	1916	Montalban	None (11 June 1901–30 December 1959)	
6		Eulogio A. Rodriguez Sr. Municipal President of Montalban (1883–1964)	Democrata	16 October 1916	15 October 1919	2 years, 364 days	1916	Montalban	None (11 June 1901–30 December 1959)	
7		Andres A. Gabriel; Member of the Rizal Provincial Board	Nacionalista	16 October 1919	01 July 1922	2 years, 258 days	1919	Navotas	None (11 June 1901–30 December 1959)	
– (Note: Acting governor.)		Arcadio C. Santos; Representative of Rizal's 1st congressional district (1886–1957)	Nacionalista	01 July 1922	15 October 1922	106 days	—	Parañaque	None (11 June 1901–30 December 1959)	
8		Eulogio A. Rodriguez Sr. Governor of Rizal (1883–1964)	Democrata	16 October 1922	17 July 1923	274 days	1922	Montalban	None (11 June 1901–30 December 1959)	
–		Ruperto T. Martinez; Member of the Rizal Provincial Board (1869–beyond 1939)	Democrata	17 July 1923	15 October 1925	2 years, 90 days	—	Morong	None (11 June 1901–30 December 1959)	
9		Andres A. Pascual; Representative of Rizal's 1st congressional district (1892–1973)	Democrata	16 October 1925	15 October 1928	2 years, 365 days	1925	Navotas	None (11 June 1901–30 December 1959)	
10		Eligio N. Naval (1877–1936)	Nacionalista	16 October 1928	15 October 1931	2 years, 364 days	1928	Navotas	None (11 June 1901–30 December 1959)	
11		Francisco S. Sevilla; Lawyer (1881–1966)	Nacionalista	16 October 1931	30 December 1937	6 years, 75 days	1931	Malabon	None (11 June 1901–30 December 1959)	
11		Francisco S. Sevilla; Lawyer (1881–1966)	Nacionalista	16 October 1931	30 December 1937	6 years, 75 days	1934	Malabon	None (11 June 1901–30 December 1959)	
12		Eulogio S. Rodriguez Jr. Businessman (1904–1957)	Nacionalista	30 December 1937	02 October 1942	4 years, 276 days	1937	Montalban	None (11 June 1901–30 December 1959)	
12		Eulogio S. Rodriguez Jr. Businessman (1904–1957)	Nacionalista	30 December 1937	02 October 1942	4 years, 276 days	1941	Montalban	None (11 June 1901–30 December 1959)	
12		Eulogio S. Rodriguez Jr. Businessman (1904–1957)	Independent	30 December 1937	02 October 1942	4 years, 276 days	— (Note: Appointed governor on February 23, 1942.)	Montalban	None (11 June 1901–30 December 1959)	
– (Note: Acting governor.)		Tomas M. Molina; Member of the Rizal Provincial Board	Independent	02 October 1942	11 April 1944	1 year, 192 days	—	Muntinlupa	None (11 June 1901–30 December 1959)	
–		Tomas M. Molina; Member of the Rizal Provincial Board	KALIBAPI	02 October 1942	11 April 1944	1 year, 192 days	—	Muntinlupa	None (11 June 1901–30 December 1959)	
13		Nicanor A. Roxas; Member of the Rizal Provincial Board (1899–1970)	KALIBAPI	11 April 1944	31 August 1944	142 days	— (Note: Appointed governor.)	Marikina	None (11 June 1901–30 December 1959)	
14		Sixto J. Antonio; Municipal President of Pasig (1891–1961)	KALIBAPI	31 August 1944	30 December 1951	7 years, 121 days	— (Note: Appointed acting governor.)	Pasig	None (11 June 1901–30 December 1959)	
14		Sixto J. Antonio; Municipal President of Pasig (1891–1961)	Nacionalista	31 August 1944	30 December 1951	7 years, 121 days	—	Pasig	None (11 June 1901–30 December 1959)	
14		Sixto J. Antonio; Municipal President of Pasig (1891–1961)	Liberal	31 August 1944	30 December 1951	7 years, 121 days	— (Note: Appointed governor on June 4, 1946.)	Pasig	None (11 June 1901–30 December 1959)	
14		Sixto J. Antonio; Municipal President of Pasig (1891–1961)	Liberal	31 August 1944	30 December 1951	7 years, 121 days	1947	Pasig	None (11 June 1901–30 December 1959)	
15		Wenceslao A. Pascual; Doctor of Medicine (1898–1967)	Nacionalista	30 December 1951	30 December 1955	4 years, 0 days	1951	Malabon	None (11 June 1901–30 December 1959)	
16		Isidro S. Rodriguez Sr. Lawyer (1915–1992)	Nacionalista	30 December 1955	25 March 1986	30 years, 85 days	1955	Montalban	None (11 June 1901–30 December 1959)	
16		Isidro S. Rodriguez Sr. Lawyer (1915–1992)	Nacionalista	30 December 1955	25 March 1986	30 years, 85 days	1959	Montalban	Nacionalista	Amado C. Gervacio (1959–1963)
16		Isidro S. Rodriguez Sr. Lawyer (1915–1992)	Nacionalista	30 December 1955	25 March 1986	30 years, 85 days	1963	Montalban	Nacionalista	Mario G. Bauza (1963–1967)
16		Isidro S. Rodriguez Sr. Lawyer (1915–1992)	Nacionalista	30 December 1955	25 March 1986	30 years, 85 days	1967	Montalban	Liberal	Neptali A. Gonzales Sr. (1967–1969)
16		Isidro S. Rodriguez Sr. Lawyer (1915–1992)	Nacionalista	30 December 1955	25 March 1986	30 years, 85 days	1967	Montalban	Nacionalista	Ruperto C. Gaite (1969–1971)
16		Isidro S. Rodriguez Sr. Lawyer (1915–1992)	Nacionalista	30 December 1955	25 March 1986	30 years, 85 days	1971	Montalban	Liberal	Arsenio N. Roldan Jr. (1971–1975)
16		Isidro S. Rodriguez Sr. Lawyer (1915–1992)	KBL	30 December 1955	25 March 1986	30 years, 85 days	1980	Montalban	KBL	Jose C. Hernandez (1980–1986)
– (Note: Appointed officer in charge.)		Benjamin B. Esguerra Sr. Mayor of Taytay	Liberal	25 March 1986	22 June 1987	1 year, 89 days	—	Taytay	Unknown (25 March 1986–02 February 1988)	
–		Isidro S. Inarda Jr. (1944–2010)	Independent	22 June 1987	02 February 1988	225 days	—	Tanay	Unknown (25 March 1986–02 February 1988)	
17		Reynaldo R. San Juan Sr. Councilor of Taytay (1941–2024)	Liberal	02 February 1988	30 June 1992	4 years, 149 days	1988	Taytay	Liberal	Jose M. Barreto Sr. (1988–1992)
18		Casimiro M. Ynares Jr. Mayor of Binangonan (born 1946)	NPC	30 June 1992	30 June 2001	9 years, 0 days	1992	Binangonan	Liberal	Nicandro D. Natividad (1992–1998)
18		Casimiro M. Ynares Jr. Mayor of Binangonan (born 1946)	NPC	30 June 1992	30 June 2001	9 years, 0 days	1995	Binangonan	Liberal	Nicandro D. Natividad (1992–1998)
18		Casimiro M. Ynares Jr. Mayor of Binangonan (born 1946)	LAMMP	30 June 1992	30 June 2001	9 years, 0 days	1998	Binangonan	LAMMP	Benjamin V. Felix (1998–2001)
19		Rebecca Alcantara-Ynares; Director of the UCPB (born 1949)	NPC	30 June 2001	30 June 2004	3 years, 0 days	2001	Binangonan	NPC	Teodoro O. O'Hara (2001–2002) (Note: Lost electoral protest on July 2, 2002.)
19		Rebecca Alcantara-Ynares; Director of the UCPB (born 1949)	NPC	30 June 2001	30 June 2004	3 years, 0 days	2001	Binangonan	Lakas–CMD	Jovita Cruz-Rodriguez (2002–2004)
20		Casimiro M. Ynares Jr. Governor of Rizal (born 1946)	PMP	30 June 2004	30 June 2007	3 years, 0 days	2004	Binangonan	PMP	Anthony Jesus S. Alarcon (2004–2007)
21		Casimiro A. Ynares III; General Manager of the LLDA (born 1973)	NPC	30 June 2007	30 June 2013	6 years, 0 days	2007	Antipolo	NPC	Frisco S. San Juan Jr. (2007–2016)
21		Casimiro A. Ynares III; General Manager of the LLDA (born 1973)	NPC	30 June 2007	30 June 2013	6 years, 0 days	2010	Antipolo	NPC	Frisco S. San Juan Jr. (2007–2016)
22		Rebecca Alcantara-Ynares; Governor of Rizal (born 1949)	NPC	30 June 2013	30 June 2022	9 years, 0 days	2013	Binangonan	NPC	Frisco S. San Juan Jr. (2007–2016)
22		Rebecca Alcantara-Ynares; Governor of Rizal (born 1949)	NPC	30 June 2013	30 June 2022	9 years, 0 days	2016	Binangonan	Liberal	Reynaldo H. San Juan Jr. (2016–2025)
22		Rebecca Alcantara-Ynares; Governor of Rizal (born 1949)	NPC	30 June 2013	30 June 2022	9 years, 0 days	2019	Binangonan	PFP	Reynaldo H. San Juan Jr. (2016–2025)
23		Nina Ricci A. Ynares-Chiongbian; Board of Trustees of the GSIS (born 1970)	NPC	30 June 2022	Incumbent	4 years, 138 days	2022	Taytay	PFP	Reynaldo H. San Juan Jr. (2016–2025)
23		Nina Ricci A. Ynares-Chiongbian; Board of Trustees of the GSIS (born 1970)	NPC	30 June 2022	Incumbent	4 years, 138 days	2025	Taytay	NPC	Josefina Galang-Gatlabayan (2025–Incumbent)

=== Governors by time in office ===
Rank	Name	Time in office	TE	Year(s) in which elected
1	Isidro Rodriguez	30 years, 85 days	6	1955; 1959; 1963; 1967; 1971; 1980
2	Casimiro Ynares Jr.	12 years, 0 days	4	1992; 1995; 1998; 2004
3	Rebecca Ynares	12 years, 0 days	4	2001; 2013; 2016; 2019
4	Sixto Antonio	7 years, 121 days	1	1947
5	Francisco Sevilla	6 years, 75 days	2	1931; 1934
6	Casimiro Ynares III	6 years, 0 days	2	2007; 2010
7	Eulogio Rodriguez Jr.	4 years, 276 days	2	1937; 1941
8	Reynaldo San Juan Sr.	4 years, 149 days	1	1988
9	Nina Ynares	4 years, 138 days	2	2022; 2025
10	Wenceslao Pascual	4 years, 0 days	1	1951
11	Mariano Melendres	3 years, 365 days	1	1912
12	Eulogio Rodriguez Sr.	3 years, 273 days	2	1916; 1922
13	Arturo Dancel	3 years, 207 days	2	1904; 1906
14	Andres Pascual	2 years, 365 days	1	1925
15	Eligio Naval	2 years, 364 days	1	1928
16	Lope K. Santos	2 years, 298 days	1	1909
17	Ambrosio Flores	2 years, 269 days	1	1902
18	Andres Gabriel	2 years, 258 days	1	1919
19	Jose Tupas	1 year, 305 days	1	1907
20	Nicanor Roxas	142 days	—	appointed

== Timeline ==
Notes

== Elections ==
- 2013 Rizal local elections
- 2016 Rizal local elections
- 2019 Rizal local elections
- 2022 Rizal local elections
- 2025 Rizal local elections
