= Banaag at Sikat =

1906 novel by Lope K. Santos

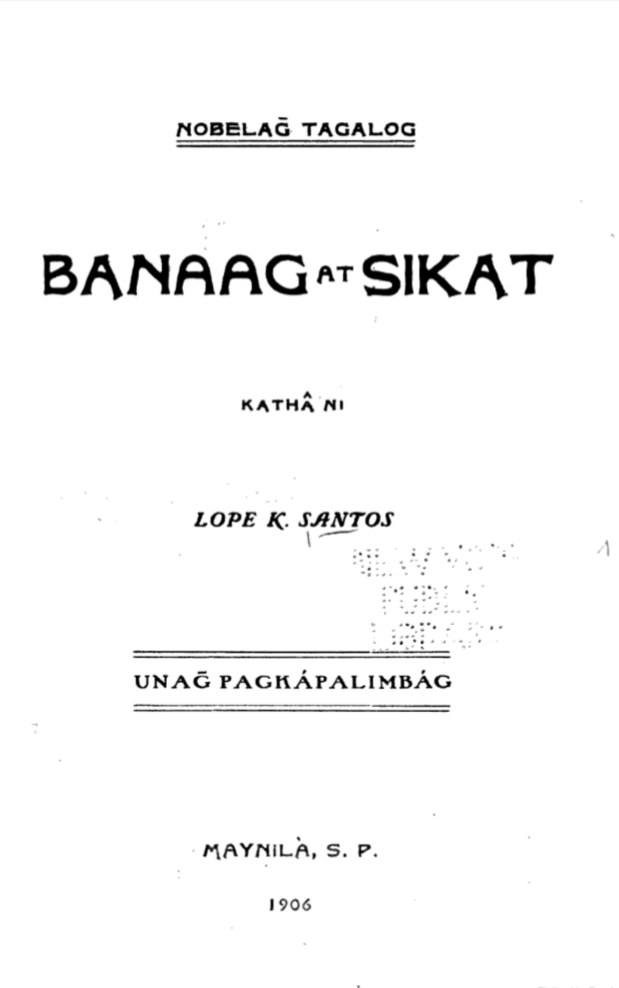
- 1906 original title page of Banaag at Sikat
- Author: Lope K. Santos
- Language: Tagalog
- Genre: Fiction
- Publication date: 1906
- Publication place: Philippines

Banaag at Sikat or From Early Dawn to Full Light is one of the first literary novels written by Filipino author Lope K. Santos in the Tagalog language in 1906. As a book that was considered as the "Bible of working class Filipinos", the pages of the novel revolves around the life of Delfin, his love for a daughter of a rich landlord, while Lope K. Santos also discusses the social issues such as socialism, capitalism, and the works of the united associations of laborers.

== Analysis and reviews ==
Although a work that discusses politics in the Philippines, Banaag at Sikat is the only novel included by Filipino critic Teodoro Agoncillo to a list of important books about Tagalog literature in 1949; according to Agoncillo the book has a weakness, but it started the system of writing a Tagalog novel. Thus, this book of Lope K. Santos paved the way on how to write other Tagalog-language novels which has a combined themes about love, livelihood, and the truthful and moving status of society. Furthermore, despite being one of the first long narratives in the Philippines that provoked the mood of society, it also motivated the cause of the Hukbalahap (Hukbo ng Bayan Laban sa Hapon, literally the "people’s army against the Japanese occupiers" during World War II).

However, this is not the first Tagalog novel, because Lope K. Santos' novel was published after Nena at Neneng - Nena and Neneng - (1905), which is considered as the first Tagalog novel published as a book and written by Valeriano Hernandez Peña. Still, there was another Tagalog novel, Cababalaghan ni P. Brava (literally, P. Brava’s Mystery) by Gabriel Beato Francisco, which appeared in installment on the pages of the magazine Kapatid ng Bayan (literally, Comrades of the Nation) in 1899.

The title Banaag at Sikat is translated by critics and reviewers into From Early Dawn to Full Light of the sun, a translation derived from the reviews done by Patricio N. Abinales and Donna J. Amoroso. In 2021, Penguin House published an English edition of Banaag at Sikat translated by Danton Remoto as Radiance and Sunrise as part of their Southeast Asian Classics.

== Plot summary ==
=== Primary characters ===
The novel is about two friends: Delfin and Felipe. Delfin is a socialist, while Felipe advocates the works of an anarchist. As a socialist, Delfin believes and wishes to spread the principles of socialism to the public, where the citizens could have more right in all the businesses, properties, and other national activities. Although he is poor who studies law and works as a writer for a newspaper, Delfin still strongly believes that a society inclined to the cause of the poor through peaceful means, a challenge that could be achieved through violence.

On the other hand, Felipe – who advocates anarchy – believes in the forceful way of destroying the existing powers and cruelty harbored by the rich landowners. He wants to dispel the abusive members of society who rule society. Even though he is the son of a rich town leader, Felipe hates the cruel ways of his father. He would rather see a society with equal rights and equal status for all its citizens: where there is no difference between the poor and the rich classes.

=== Selected scenes and scenarios ===
Due to his hatred of his life as a son of a cruel and rich landowner, Felipe left his home to live a life of poverty. He left his life of luxury in order to join the common class of society. He decided to live with Don Ramon, a godfather through the Catholic sacrament of confirmation, in Manila. Later on, Felipe also felt hatred against his godfather who was just like his father: a rich man cruel to his helpers. Felipe fell in love with Tentay, a commoner but with dignity despite being poor. Felipe was forced by his father to return to their home in the town of Silangan, but was only forced to leave the home after teaching the farmers and household helpers about their inherent human rights.

Don Ramon, Felipe’s godfather, has two daughters. Thalia was the eldest and Meni is the youngest daughter. Delfin - Felipe’s friend – fell in love with one of these two siblings, Meni. Meni became pregnant and was disowned by Don Ramon. Meni decided to live with Delfin to live as a commoner. Because of what Meni did, Don Ramon left the Philippines, together with a favored household helper named Tekong, but was murdered while in New York City. Don Ramon’s body was brought back to the Philippines by Ruperto, the long lost brother of Tentay, Felipe’s sweetheart. It was Ruperto who revealed the reason why Don Ramon was killed by an unknown assailant: he was ruthless to his household helpers.

The novel ends at a scene when Felipe and Delfin decided to stay for a while at the grave of Don Ramon. They talked about their principles and social beliefs. They left the cemetery while approaching the darkness and the depth of the night.

== See also ==
- Philippine literature
