= Eulogio Rodriguez =

President of the Senate of the Philippines from 1954 to 1963, 1952 to 1953

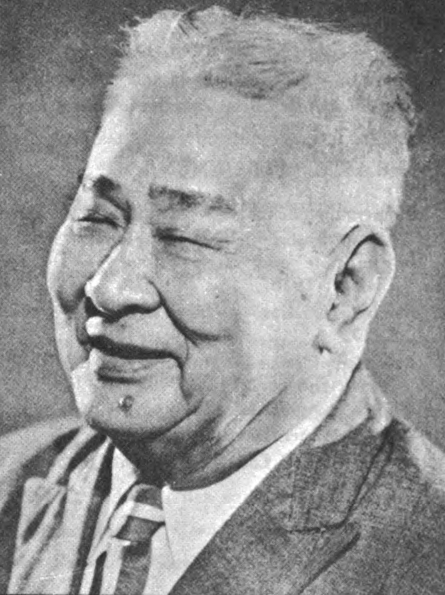
- Rodriguez in 1964

7th and 10th President of the Senate of the Philippines
- In office May 20, 1953 – April 5, 1963
- Preceded by: Jose Zulueta
- Succeeded by: Ferdinand Marcos
- In office April 30, 1952 – April 17, 1953
- Preceded by: Camilo Osías
- Succeeded by: Camilo Osías

Senator of the Philippines
- In office December 30, 1949 – December 9, 1964
- In office July 5, 1945 – December 30, 1947

5th and 9th Mayor of Manila
- In office January 5, 1940 – August 28, 1941
- Vice Mayor: Carmen Planas
- Preceded by: Juan Posadas Jr.
- Succeeded by: Juan Nolasco
- In office July 17, 1923 – February 8, 1924
- Appointed by: Leonard Wood
- Vice Mayor: Juan Posadas Jr.
- Preceded by: Ramón Fernández
- Succeeded by: Miguel Romuáldez

Secretary of Agriculture and Commerce
- In office July 26, 1934 – 1938
- President: Manuel L. Quezon
- Governor-General: Frank Murphy
- Preceded by: Vicente Singson Encarnacion
- Succeeded by: Benigno Aquino Sr.

Member of the House of Representatives from Rizal's 2nd district
- In office June 2, 1931 – September 16, 1935
- Preceded by: Luís Santiago
- Succeeded by: Emilio de la Paz Sr.
- In office June 2, 1925 – June 5, 1928
- Preceded by: Mariano Melendres
- Succeeded by: Luís Santiago

Member of the House of Representatives from Nueva Vizcaya's at-large district
- In office June 12, 1924 – May 1925
- Preceded by: Evaristo Pañganiban
- Succeeded by: Antonio Escamilla

6th and 8th Governor of Rizal
- In office October 16, 1922 – July 17, 1923
- Preceded by: Arcadio Santos
- Succeeded by: Ruperto Martinez
- In office October 16, 1916 – October 15, 1919
- Preceded by: Mariano Melendres
- Succeeded by: Andres Gabriel

Municipal President of Montalban
- In office 1906–1916
- Preceded by: Position established
- Succeeded by: Eusebio Manuel

President of the Chamber of Commerce of the Philippine Islands
- In office 1934–1935
- Preceded by: Arsenio Luz
- Succeeded by: Leopoldo Aguinaldo

4th President of the Nacionalista Party
- In office 1953–1964
- Preceded by: Sergio Osmeña
- Succeeded by: Gil Puyat

Personal details
- Born: Eulogio Rodríguez y Adona; January 21, 1883 Montalban, Manila, Captaincy General of the Philippines
- Died: December 9, 1964 (aged 81) Pasay, Rizal, Philippines
- Resting place: Montalban Memorial Park, Rodriguez, Rizal
- Party: Nacionalista (1933–1964)
- Other political affiliations: Democrata (1917–1933); Progresista (1907–1917); Federalista (1906–1907)
- Spouses: Juana Santiago; Luisita Canóy; Pilar Leyba
- Children: 10 (including Isidro)

Eulogio "Amang" Adona Rodriguez Sr. (January 21, 1883 – December 9, 1964), nicknamed Yoyong, was a Filipino politician who twice served as President of the Senate of the Philippines from 1952 to 1963. He also served in various positions in government prior to the Japanese invasion in World War II: as the municipal president of Montalban, Rizal from 1906 to 1916, as the governor of Rizal, as the mayor of Manila, as representative of Rizal's 2nd district, and as secretary of agriculture and commerce.

He was known for vehemently confronting corruption during the administration of Carlos P. Garcia, alleging he held a list of corrupt officials close to the president which the media dubbed the "White Paper".

== Early life and education ==
Eulogio Rodriguez was born on January 21, 1883, in Montalban (now Rodriguez), to Petronilo Rodriguez and Monica Adona. Eulogio's paternal grandfather Pablo was a Marikina resident who had moved to Montalban, while according to Eulogio's descendants, Monica's father likely had Chinese blood. Eulogio, nicknamed "Yoyong", was the eldest of seven children. At the time of his birth, Montalban was part of the province of Manila but it was later renamed Rodriguez in his honor. Rodriguez's mother was noted to be an "old-fashioned" disciplinarian. His younger brother, Julian, was a lawyer who became an appointed mayor of Davao City from 1954 to 1955, where he become a successful landowner after moving there.

Rodriguez grew up playing cara y cruz with other children and riding horses, with his father gifting him a colt that he closely raised and rode around. As a child, he was described by a biographer to have had a "well-built" physique and "qualities of fairness and sober judgment", which was claimed by separate biographer Carlos Quirino to have led other children to see him "as a leader in their juvenile jaunts and adventures."

He first studied at the Spanish-run public school in Montalban, then took his secondary course at the Colegio de San Juan de Letran in Manila, where he later completed his Bachelor of Arts in 1896. He then received a Bachelor of Arts degree at the University of the Philippines in 1916. He then worked as a librarian and assistant cataloguer, then later on he studied law under a private tutor. To help himself in his studies, he worked as a farmer.

== Political career ==
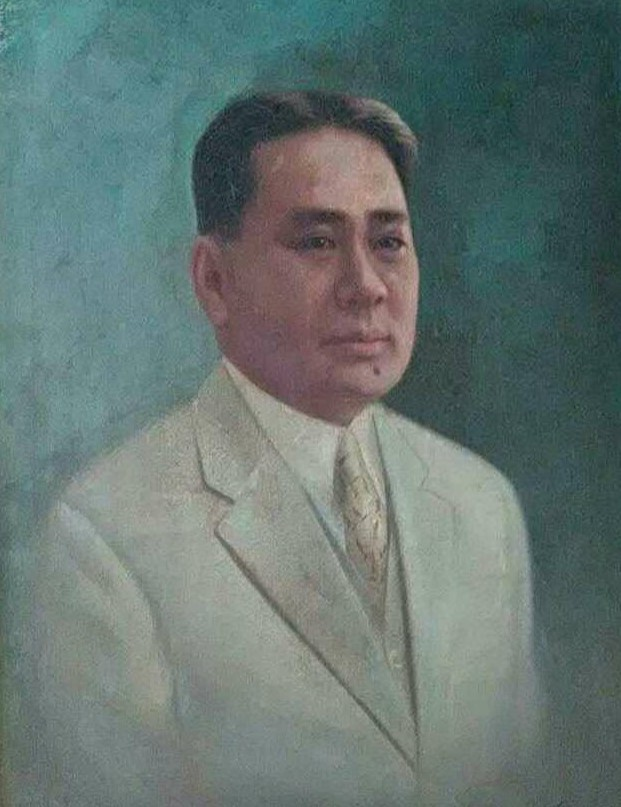
Portrait of Rodriguez as Governor of Rizal

Rodriguez first served as Municipal President of Montalban, Rizal from 1906 to 1916 and became Governor of Rizal from 1916 to 1919 and from 1922 to 1923. He was appointed mayor of Manila by Governor General Leonard Wood on July 23, 1923, and later appointed as Representative of Nueva Vizcaya from February 1924 to May 1925. He became the elected Representative of the Second District of Rizal from 1925 to 1928 and from 1931 to 1935.

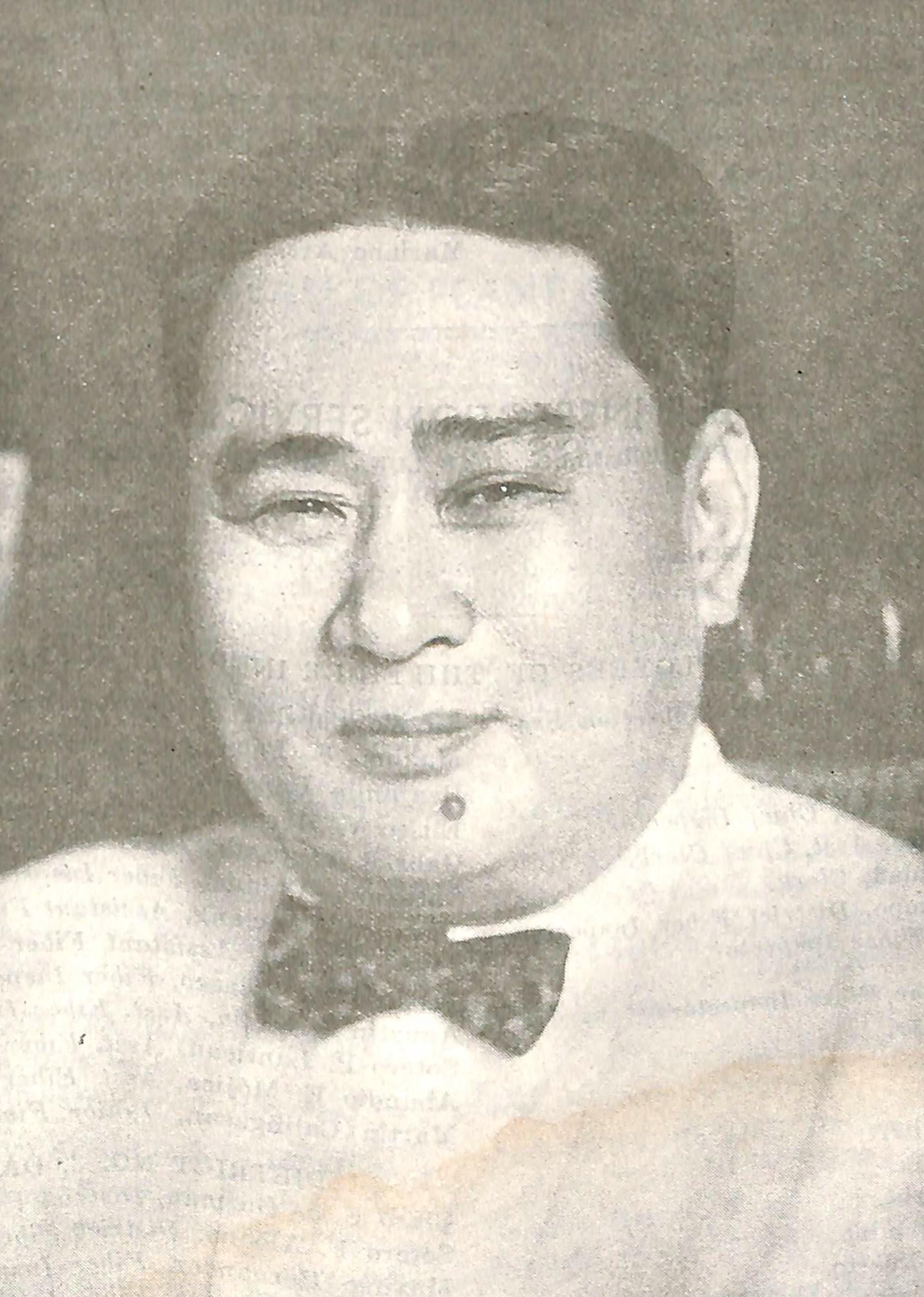
Rodriguez as Secretary of Agriculture and Commerce in 1939

He was also appointed Secretary of Agriculture and Commerce by Governor-General Frank Murphy on July 26, 1934, re-appointed by President Manuel L. Quezon on November 15, 1935, and served as such until 1938. After his resignation as Mayor of Manila, which he held once again from 1940 to 1941, he campaigned for a seat in the Senate and was elected senator in 1941. However, he would begin serving his first Senate term in 1945 due to Imperial Japan's invasion of the Philippines during World War II. In the middle of his first Senate term, he ran for Vice President in 1946 as the running mate of President Sergio Osmeña, but lost to fellow Senator Elpidio Quirino. He initially lost his Senate re-election bid in 1947, but was proclaimed winner due to an electoral protest filed against Carlos Tan. He returned to the Senate in 1949, re-elected in 1953 and 1959, and served until his death in 1964.

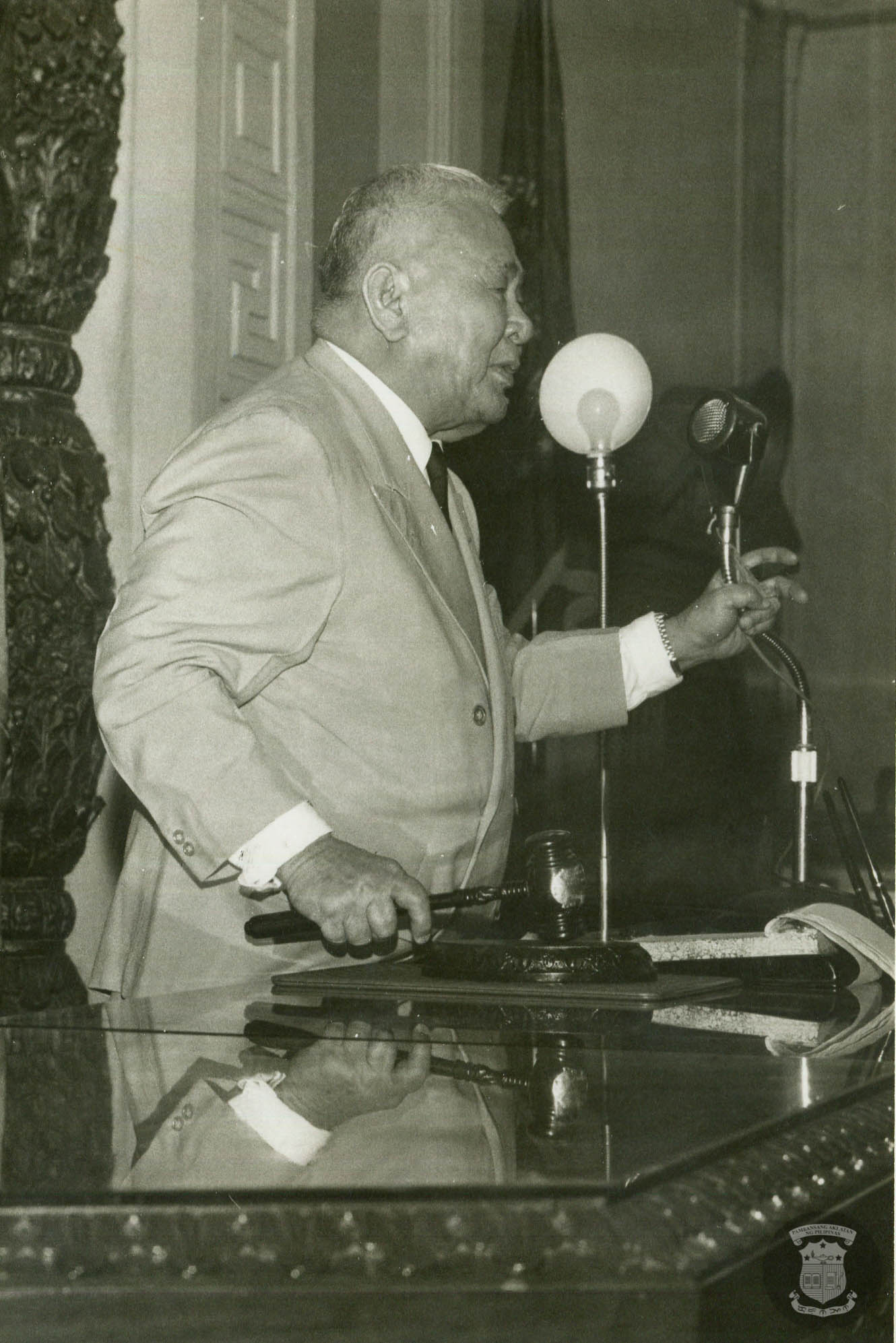
Rodriguez as Senate President, c. 1960s

On May 20, 1953, he was elected Senate President, a position he occupied for the next ten years. As the third highest government official, he steered the Senate into greater heights in terms of legislation. He was replaced by then-Senator Ferdinand Marcos, then the Minority Floor Leader, as Senate President in a leadership coup in 1963, ending his long leadership of the Upper Chamber.

=== Party affiliation ===
Rodriguez began his political career as a member of the opposition party, known as the Democrata, but later switched to the Nacionalista Party, the ruling party, in 1933, following a political realignment prompted by the contentious debate over the Independence Law. He remained a loyal member of the Nacionalista Party for the rest of his life, spanning over three decades until his death, thus earning him the nickname "Mr. Nacionalista". Unlike many politicians of his time, he did not switch parties for personal convenience.

== Personal life ==
Rodriguez had seven children by his first wife, Juana Santiago-Rodriguez (1881-1954): Eulogio Jr., Jose, Ruperto, Leonor, Isidro Sr., Constancio and Adelaida. Juana, the namesake of the street in Quezon City (now known as Broadway Avenue, adjacent to E. Rodriguez, Sr. Avenue), predeceased him. Rodriguez subsequently remarried Doña Luisa Canoy. With her, he had three children: Adelaida, Erlinda and Rafael. He later married a third wife, Pilar Leyba. His son Eulogio Jr. served as governor of Rizal from 1937 to 1942 and as representative of Rizal's 1st district from December 30, 1949 until his death on December 24, 1957 (days before his congressional term's end).

His grandchildren include former Rizal congressman Isidro S. Rodriguez, Jr. and great-grandchildren Eulogio L. Rodriguez, III.

Rodriguez was the older brother of lawyer and Davao City's last-appointed mayor Julian Rodriguez, who became a successful landowner in that city where he migrated in 1919, when it was still a booming town. Julian was also a technical assistant to the Mindanao and Sulu Commission prior to his mayorship.

== Death ==
Rodriguez died in his sleep on December 9, 1964, at his home in Pasay due to a heart attack at the age of 81.

The sudden death of Rodriguez, president of the Nacionalista Party for the past 18 years, marked the “passing of a great tradition,” quoted President Diosdado Macapagal. Many came to visit the funeral of the man they called "Don Yoyong". Macapagal declared on December 9 until his burial a period of national mourning, where all flags would be flown at half-staff. Rodriguez's remains were laid to rest at a cemetery behind his rest house in Montalban.

== Legacy ==
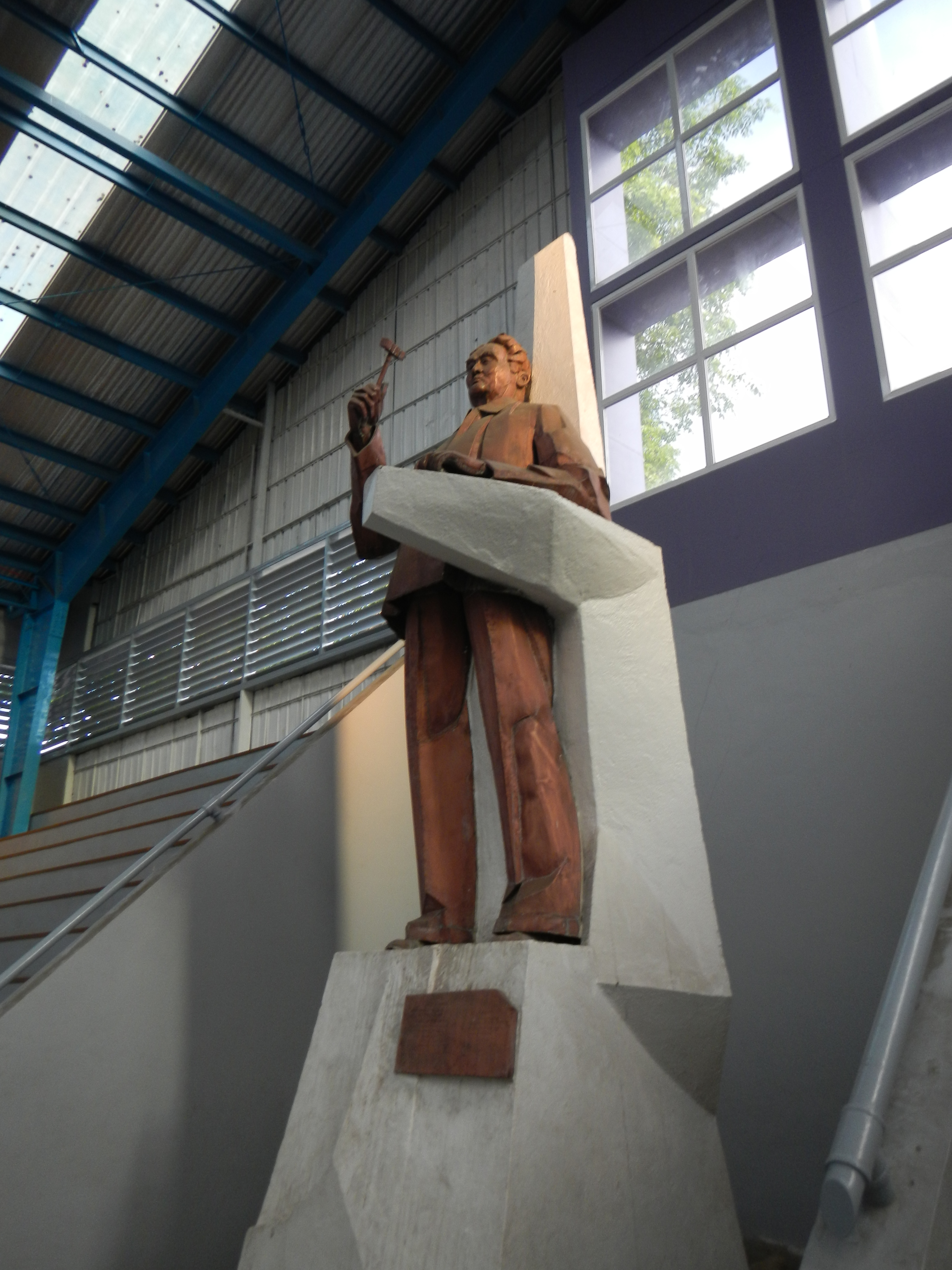
Eulogio A. Rodriguez, Sr. Monument in Rodriguez, Rizal

After Rodriguez's death, the 'Amang' Rodriguez Memorial Medical Center, a public hospital in Marikina, was named after him upon its opening in 1966. Rodriguez became famous for his malaprops, and it raised his reputation as a beloved everyman of the people.

Eulogio Rodriguez Vocational High School (now Eulogio "Amang" Rodriguez Institute of Science and Technology) was established in 1945 and was named after him. The Amang Rodriguez Elementary School in Malabon, Eulogio Rodriguez Integrated School in Mandaluyong, and Eulogio Rodriguez Sr. Elementary School in Quezon City are also named after him. The aforementioned cities were formerly part of Rizal province, where Rodriguez served as its governor.

España Boulevard Extension in Quezon City and an avenue between barangays Rosario and Dela Paz in Pasig were renamed in his honor, as well as the municipality of Montalban.

== Electoral history ==
Electoral history of Eulogio Rodriguez
Year	Office	Party	Votes received				Result
Year	Office	Party	Total	%	P.	Swing	Result
1916	Governor of Rizal	Progresista	—N/a	—N/a	1st	—N/a	Won
1922	Governor of Rizal	Democrata	—N/a	—N/a	1st	—N/a	Won
1925	Representative (Rizal–2nd)	Democrata	—N/a	—N/a	1st	—N/a	Won
1931	Representative (Rizal–2nd)	Democrata	—N/a	—N/a	1st	—N/a	Won
1941	Senator of the Philippines	Nacionalista	982,144	58.72%	8th	—N/a	Won
1947	Senator of the Philippines	Nacionalista	1,346,174	41.24%	10th	−17.48	Lost
1953	Senator of the Philippines	Nacionalista	2,071,844	47.89%	3rd	+6.65	Won
1959	Senator of the Philippines	Nacionalista	2,037,682	31.87%	6th	−16.02	Won
1946	Vice President of the Philippines	Nacionalista	1,051,243	47.38%	2nd	—N/a	Lost

== See also ==
- List of Philippine legislators who died in office

== Sources ==
- Senate of the Philippines
- Paras, Corazon. The presidents of the Senate of the Republic of the Philippines. Quezon City: Giraffe Books, 2000. ISBN 971-8832-24-6
