= Victor Buencamino =

- Born: Victor Abreu Buencamino; February 15, 1888; Tondo, Manila, Captaincy General of the Philippines
- Died: 1977 (aged 88–89)
- Education: New York State College of Veterinary Medicine
- Relatives: Felipe Buencamino (father)
- Medical career
- Profession: Veterinarian
- Institutions: Bureau of Animal Industry (Philippines)

Victor Abreu Buencamino as a Filipino veterinarian and businessman who is credited for establishing the first veterinary hospital in the Philippines.

== Early life and education ==
Victor Abreu Buencamino was born in the affluent part of Tondo, Manila on February 15, 1888. His father is Felipe Buencamino and his mother was Guadalupe Salazar Abre, the Buencamino patriarch's second wife. The younger Buencamino's mother died when he was still in his youth and was raised instead by his aunt and grandmotheru.

Buencamino attended Ateneo de Manila. He was expelled from Ateneo after alleging a Jesuit instructor as a thief. Taking advantage of his father's connections, Buencamino and his brother Philipp went to the United States in October 1900 to further their studies.

The brothers attended the boys boarding school Boone's University School in Berkeley, California to complete their high school studies. He enrolled at the University of California College of Commerce in 1906 for college but his studies were disrupted by the 1906 San Francisco earthquake.

Buencamino worked as a livestock inspector with the Bureau of Agriculture from 1906 to 1908. He eventually returned to the United States. He graduated from the New York State College of Veterinary Medicine at Cornell University in 1911.

== Career ==
=== Veterinarian practice ===
Buencamino is known for various milestones in the history of the veterinarian profession in the Philippines. He also became the first Filipino president in Philippine Veterinary Medical Association with his first tenure lasting from 1919 to 1920, and his second tenure from 1931 to 1934.

He is the first Filipino veterinarian, the first Filipino Director of the Bureau of Animal Industry (1933–1936), and the first Filipino to establish a private veterinary hospital in the country.

=== Business ===
Buencamino was involved in the beef industry. Partnering with Ramon Soriano, they started the first large-scale importation of live cattle in the Philippines in 1916, sourcing animals from Brazil, British Hong Kong and French Indochina.

He was also became the first general manager and vice-president of the state-owned National Rice and Corn Corporation in 1935. He became director of the Philippine National Bank, National Produce Exchange and Philippine Tannery in 1936.

== Personal life ==
Buencamino is friends with Philippine President Manuel L. Quezon. While born in Tondo, Manila, Buencamino has links to the province of Nueva Ecija. He married Dolores "Lolita" Arguelles in 1919 with whom he had children.

== Death ==
Buencamino died on 1977.
