= Mariano Melendres =

Governor of Rizal from 1913 to 1916

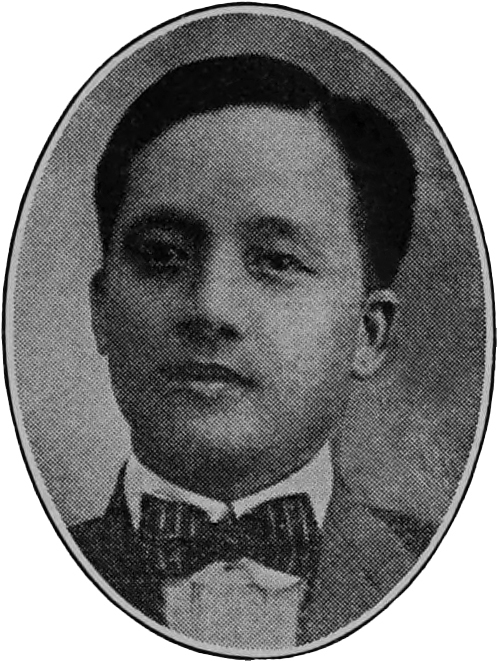
- Melendres as member of the House of Representatives, c. 1921

Member of the Philippine House of Representatives from Rizal's 2nd District
- In office June 3, 1919 – June 2, 1925
- Preceded by: Eugenio Santos
- Succeeded by: Eulogio Rodriguez

5th Governor of Rizal
- In office October 16, 1912 – October 15, 1916
- Preceded by: Lope K. Santos
- Succeeded by: Eulogio Rodriguez

Personal details
- Born: Mariano Melendres y Concepción; June 8, 1881 Pasig, Manila, Spanish East Indies
- Died: July 11, 1981 (aged 100) Pasig, Metro Manila, Philippines
- Party: Nacionalista (1925–1981)
- Other political affiliations: Democrata (1919–1925); Progresista (1912–1916)
- Spouse: Dolores Medinaceli-Melendres
- Children: 8
- Parents: Cornelio Melendres (father); Cándida Concepción (mother)
- Occupation: Lawyer, Politician

Mariano Concepción Melendres Sr. (born Mariano Melendres y Concepción; June 8, 1881 – July 11, 1981) was a Filipino politician who served as the Governor of Rizal from 1913 to 1916. Later on, he would then serve as the representative of the Second District of Rizal from 1919 to 1925.

== Early life ==
Melendres was born on June 8, 1881, in Pasig, Manila, to Cornelio Melendres and Cándida Concepción. He was the second child of three siblings. He had an older brother named Leon and a younger sister named Consuelo. His father, Cornelio, died shortly after his sister's birth. Because of his father's death, his mother sent him and his older brother, Leon, to their grandfather, Rev. Leon Sison, because of financial issues. From then on, Rev. Sison would be in charge of their care and education.

In 1894, Melendres attended the Ateneo Municipal de Manila (now known as the Ateneo de Manila University) under the guidance of Jesuit Fathers, finishing both primary and secondary education there until the year 1903, in which he received his Bachelor of Arts degree, where he was rated sobresaliente in all his subjects, earning him the title of Emperador. He would then study at the University of Santo Tomas to finish his three law courses from 1904 to 1906. And in 1908, he moved to the Escuela de Derecho to finish his studies. He would then graduate and pass the bar exams in 1910.

== Political career ==
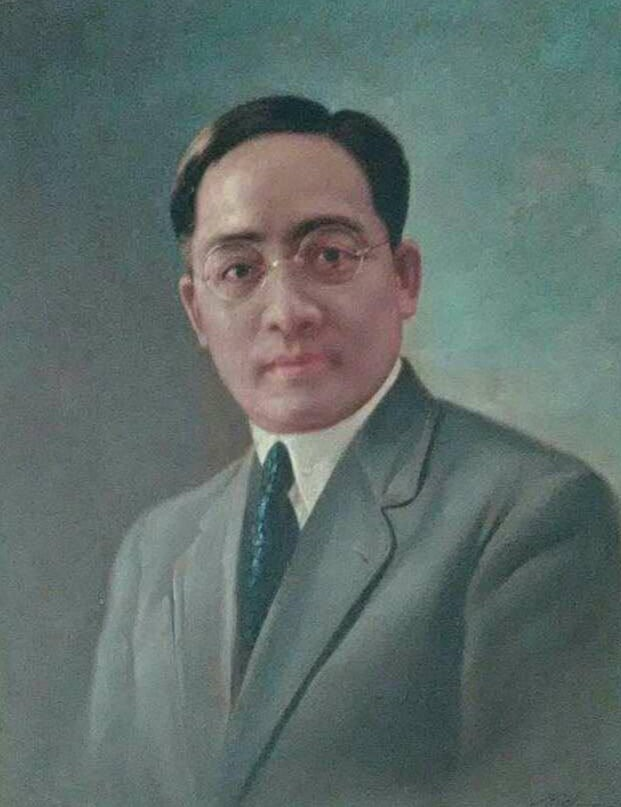
Portrait of Melendres as Governor of Rizal

After two years of passing the bar, he was elected as the Governor of Rizal. Most records during his administration were destroyed during the Second World War, but what remained showed that he directed the building of roads and bridges including the Teresa Highway from Antipolo to Tanay. He also initiated the construction of different artisan wells in different areas of the province, and worked for the construction of irrigation projects, which made him popular with farmers. Melendres brought about the construction of the Rizal Provincial High School (now known as the Rizal High School), since the school's land has been constantly financed by the provincial fund. His administration brought an end to it by acquiring adjacent land through expropriation proceedings from the landowners. A concrete school building was constructed to become the Rizal Provincial High School and it was completed and occupied in 1915. During his administration, a contagious disease among cattle broke out in the province which caused heavy tolls to farmers. At the same time, there was a locust infestation in the province of Rizal. In response, Melendres took drastic measures against municipal officials who were found negligent in the enforcement of the quarantine rules on animal diseases.

After his term, he was succeeded by his personal friend Eulogio Rodriguez as the Governor of Rizal. Melendres then joined the law firm of Juan Sumulong, and served as the legal counsel to Rodriguez.

In 1919, he was elected to the House of Representatives representing the 2nd district of Rizal, until 1922. He was again elected serving a second term from 1922 to 1925 under the 6th Philippine Legislature. Like after his governorship, he was followed by Eulogio Rodriguez.

Melendres was chosen as the Delegate for the Province of Rizal, in the 1935 Philippine constitutional plebiscite, held from July 30, 1934, to February 8, 1935.

In 1941, Melendres was appointed Judge for the provinces of Leyte, Samar, Bohol and Marinduque but war soon broke out in the country. After the war, he was reassigned to the same provinces on October 2, 1946. He was then reassigned again by the judiciary to Nueva Ecija until his retirement in 1951.

He was awarded the “Distinguished Service Cross” of Rizal. He was also awarded as one of the “Ten Outstanding Citizen of Rizal,” the province's version of the prestigious Ramon Magsaysay Award including cash emoluments.

Melendres was also a member of the Progresista Party under his governorship, and a member of the Democrata Party when he was a congressman. After his tenure, he was a member of the Nacionalista Party before dying.

== Personal life ==
Melendres is married to Dolores Medinaceli. Together they had eight children, namely: Belen, Leon, Leticia, Mariano Jr., Manuel, Cornelio and Miguel. All of his children survived adulthood except for Manuel. In the Second World War, Manuel was drafted into the Philippine Army including another son. Manuel was killed in action on Corregidor in 1942.

He was born as a Roman Catholic by religion.

On July 11, 1981, Melendres died peacefully in his sleep at the age of 100.
