= Lope K. Santos =

Filipino writer and politician (1879–1963)

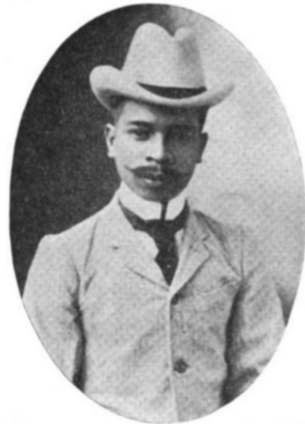
- Santos from a 1906 publication of "Banaag at Sikat"

Senator of the Philippines from the 12th District
- In office July 1, 1920 – November 15, 1921
- Appointed by: Francis Burton Harrison
- Preceded by: Joaquin Luna
- Succeeded by: Hadji Butu

2nd Governor of Nueva Vizcaya
- In office 1918–1920
- Preceded by: Tomas Maddela Sr.
- Succeeded by: Domingo Maddela

4th Governor of Rizal
- In office December 22, 1909 – October 15, 1912
- Preceded by: Jose Tupas
- Succeeded by: Mariano Melendres

Personal details
- Born: Lope Santos y Canseco; September 25, 1879 Pasig, Manila, Captaincy General of the Philippines
- Died: May 1, 1963 (aged 83) Philippines
- Resting place: Manila South Cemetery
- Party: Nacionalista
- Education: Escuela de Derecho de Manila (now Manila Law College Foundation)
- Occupation: writer, lawyer, politician
- Known for: Banaag at Sikat; Ako'y Si Wika; Aḡ Paḡgiḡera; Ano Ang Babae?
- Nickname: "Father of the Filipino Grammar"

Lope K. Santos (born Lope Santos y Canseco, September 25, 1879 – May 1, 1963) was a Filipino Tagalog-language writer and former senator of the Philippines. He is best known for his 1906 socialist novel, Banaag at Sikat and for his contributions to the development of Filipino grammar and Tagalog orthography.

== Biography ==
Lope K. Santos was born in Pasig, Province of Manila (now a part of Metro Manila) as Lope Santos y Canseco to Ladislao Santos, a native of Pasig, and Victorina Canseco, a native of San Mateo, on September 25, 1879. He was raised in Pandacan. His father was imprisoned during Philippine Revolution because Spanish authorities found copies of José Rizal's Noli Me Tángere and Ang Kalayaan in his possession.

Santos was sent to Escuela Normal Superior de Maestros (Higher Normal School for Teachers) for education and later finished schooling at Colegio Filipino. During the Philippine Revolution of 1896, Santos joined the revolutionaries. As his mother was dying, she requested Lope to marry Simeona Salazar. The two wed on February 10, 1900, and they had three children: Lakambini, Luwalhati and Makaaraw.

He pursued law at the Academia de la Jurisprudencia then at Escuela de Derecho de Manila (now Manila Law College Foundation) where he received a Bachelor of Arts degree in 1912. In late 1900, Santos started writing his own newspaper, Ang Kaliwanagan (The Illumination). This was also the time when socialism became emergent in world ideology. When José Ma. Dominador Goméz was charged by the Supreme Court with sedition and illegal association against the government then sentenced in 1903, Goméz's labor group, Unión Obrera Democrática Filipina (Philippine Democratic Labor Union) was absorbed by Santos. The group was renamed as Unión del Trabajo de Filipinas, but later dissolved in 1907.

In 1903, Santos started serialising portions of his first novel, Banaag at Sikat (From Early Dawn to Full Light) in his weekly labor magazine, Muling Pagsilang (The Rebirth), completing it in 1906. When published in book form, Banaag at Sikat was considered the first socialist-oriented book in the Philippines for expounding the principles of socialism, and seeking labor reforms from the government. The book later helped inspire the 1932 assembly of the Socialist Party of the Philippines and the 1946 meeting of the Hukbalahap.

Santos also became an expert in dupluhan, a poetic debate style from the period. Dupluhan can be compared to balagtasan, another poetic debate technique which became popular half a century before Santos' time. He also founded Sampaguita, a weekly lifestyle magazine.

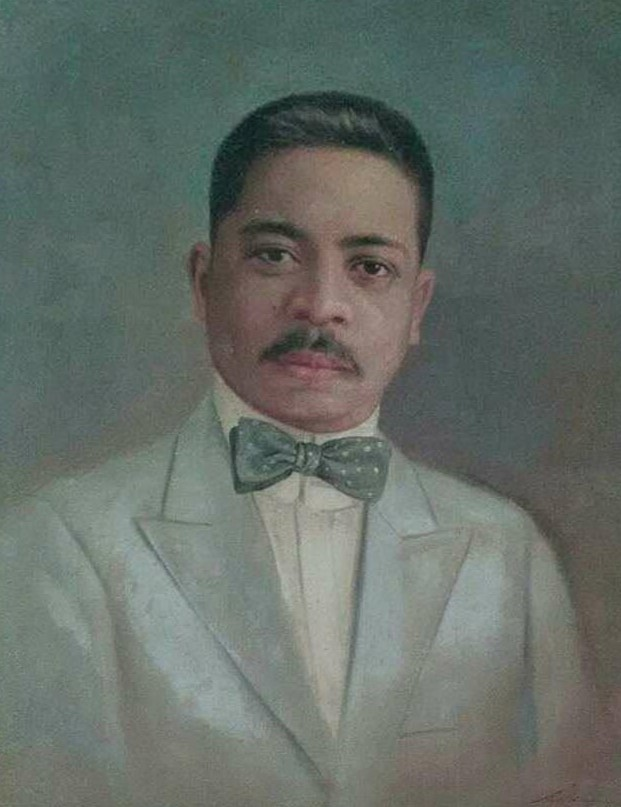
Portrait of Santos as Governor of Rizal

In the early 1910s, he started a campaign to promote a '"national language for the Philippines", holding symposia and lectures and heading numerous departments for national language in leading Philippine universities. In 1910, he was elected governor of the province of Rizal under the Nacionalista Party. In 1918, he was appointed governor of the newly resurveyed Nueva Vizcaya until 1920. Consequently, he was appointed to the 5th Philippine Legislature as senator from the twelfth senatorial district, representing provinces with non-Christian majorities. He was the primary author of Philippine Legislature Act No. 2946, which declared November 30 of each year to be Bonifacio Day, a public holiday in memory of revolutionary leader Andrés Bonifacio. He resigned from Senate in 1921.

In 1940, Santos published the first grammar of the "national language", Balarila ng Wikang Pambansa (Grammar of the National Language), commissioned by the Surian ng Wikang Pambansa (SWF). The next year, he was appointed Director of the SWF by President Manuel L. Quezon, and stayed until 1946. When the Commonwealth of the Philippines became a founding member of the United Nations in 1945, he was selected to translate the then-enforced 1935 Constitution for UNESCO. He was also made to assist translating the inaugural addresses of presidents Jose P. Laurel and Manuel A. Roxas.

In the early 1960s, he underwent surgeries on his liver due to complications. Santos died on May 1, 1963.

== Works ==
The works of Santos include the following:

- Banaag at Sikat (From Early Dawn to Full Light), 1903–06, first literary novel in Tagalog that incorporates socialist ideas and the works of the united associations of laborers.
- Ag̃ "Pag̃gig̃gera" (Tulag̃ Handog sa Kababaiga'g̃ Tagalog) (The "Paḡgiḡgera" (A Poem for Tagalog Women)), 1912, paḡgiḡgera is a form of early 20th century gambling.
- Kundanḡan...!: Nobelang Tagalog Katha (Deference...!: A Tagalog Novel), 1927, Santos' second literary novel.
- Tinḡíng Pahapáw sa Kasaysayan ñg Pámitikang Tagalog (Few Points in the History of Tagalog Literature), 1938
- Puso't Diwa (Heart and Spirit), three volume book collection of chosen poems of Santos during American period.
- Sino Ka? Ako'y Si... 60 Sagot na mga Tulá (Who Are You? I am... 60 Answering Poems), 1946, collection of philosophical poems.
- Mga Hamak na Dakilà: 60 Tulâ (Mean Magnificent: 60 poems), 1950, humorous collection of war-period poems.
- "Makábagong" Balarilà?: Mga Puná at Payo sa "Sariling Wikà" ("Modern" Grammar?: Views and Advices for "Sariling Wikà"), 1951, a review and criticism of the book Sariling Wikà: Balarilà ng Wikang Pambansa of former Surian ng Wikang Pambansa director Cirio H. Panganiban.

== See also ==
- Norberto Romualdez
