= Felipe Buencamino =

Secretary of Foreign Relations of the Philippines in 1899

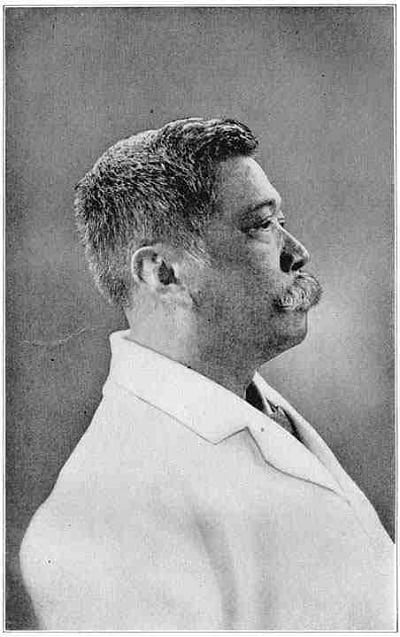
- Buencamino c. 1900

1st Secretary of Public Development
- In office September 26, 1898 – January 21, 1899
- President: Emilio Aguinaldo
- Prime Minister: Apolinario Mabini
- Preceded by: Position established
- Succeeded by: Gracio Gonzaga

2nd Secretary of Foreign Relations
- In office May 7, 1899 – November 13, 1899
- President: Emilio Aguinaldo
- Prime Minister: Pedro Paterno
- Preceded by: Apolinario Mabini
- Succeeded by: Elpidio Quirino in 1946 as Secretary of Foreign Affairs

Member of the Malolos Congress from Zamboanga
- In office September 15, 1898 – November 13, 1899 Serving with Tomás Mascardo and Lazaro Tanedo
- Constituency: at-large district

Personal details
- Born: Felipe Buencamino y Siojo; August 23, 1848 San Miguel de Mayumo, Bulacan, Captaincy General of the Philippines
- Died: February 6, 1929 (aged 80) Manila, Philippine Islands
- Party: Federalista
- Other political affiliations: Independent (1898–1900)
- Spouse(s): Juana Arnedo; Guadalupe Salazar Abreu
- Children: 13
- Education: University of Santo Tomas (AB)
- Occupation: Politician, diplomat
- Profession: Lawyer

Felipe Buencamino y Siojo (August 23, 1848 – February 6, 1929) was a Filipino lawyer, diplomat, and politician. He fought alongside the Spaniards in the Philippine Revolution but later switched sides and joined Emilio Aguinaldo's revolutionary cabinet. He was a member of the Malolos Congress and co-authored the Malolos Constitution. He was also appointed as Secretary of Foreign Relations in the cabinet of Aguinaldo. After he left the revolutionary government, he co-founded the Federalista Party and became a founding member of the Philippine Independent Church.

== Early life ==
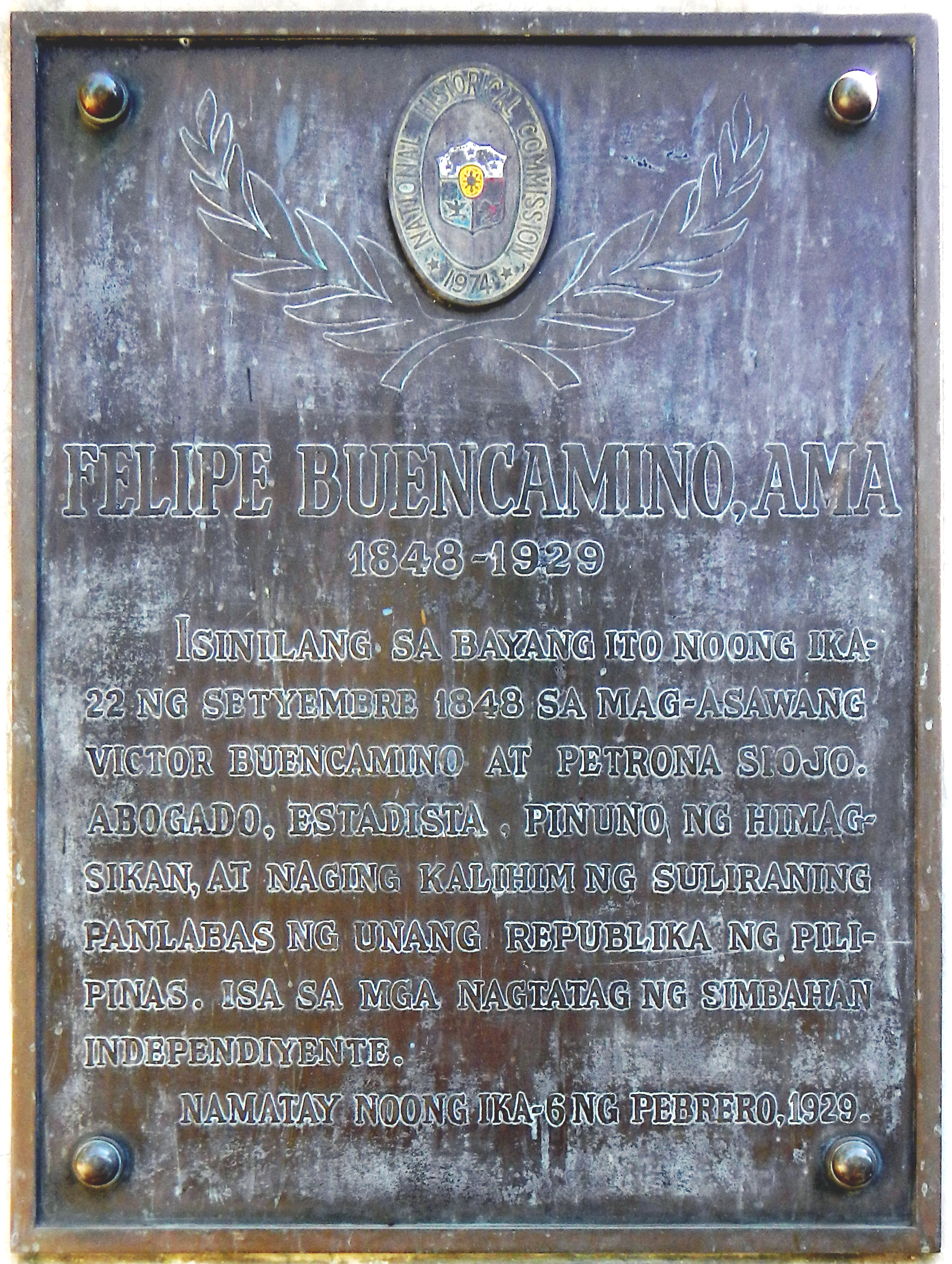
National historical marker installed in 1974 at his birthplace in San Miguel, Bulacan

He was born in San Miguel, Bulacan to Victor Buencamino and Petrona Siojo. Before the Hispanization of the Philippine natives, his surname was Mangalindan (a contraction of Magaling na daan or good road). Felipe studied at the University of Santo Tomas, where he obtained his A.B. degree with honors. He was one of Father José Burgos' students alongside Paciano Rizal, José Rizal's older brother. He also received a diploma in law from the same university in 1884.

== Career ==
After he earned his law degree, he went to work for the Manila Audencia (court). In 1886, he was appointed fiscal and then judge of Batanes, and in 1888, he was appointed judge of Tayabas. During the revolution, he fought under the Spanish flag, rising through the ranks to become a colonel in the Spanish army. However, after the failed Pact of Biak-na-Bato and the resumption of the revolution, he was accused of being a spy and was imprisoned in Cavite City. When he was freed, he immediately joined the revolutionary movement and fought in the battles of Kamansi and Mount Arayat.

When 270 Spanish navy infantry prisoners were handed to General Aguinaldo at Teatro Caviteño following the Battle of Alapan at Imus on May 28, 1898, he was being held in the tower of the Osorio family estate in Cavite Puerto for being accused of being a spy. He was present when the Philippine flag was first unfurled. General Tomas Mascardo stayed in charge of Buencamino until June 6, 1898. However, he was present for the declaration of Philippine independence in Kawit on June 12, 1898. He later served as a delegate to the Malolos Congress, In September 26, 1898, Emilio Aguinaldo named Buencamino as secretario de fomento (in English: Secretary of Development).

The First Philippine Republic was inaugurated on January 23, 1899. By February, Filipinos found themselves at war with their erstwhile American ally. The war was triggered by the February 4 killing of a Filipino corporal in Santa Mesa, Manila by an American sentry and the massive attack against Filipino troops the next day. He investigated the incident through the orders of Aguinaldo. His report put the blame squarely on the occupying American forces. Yet by May 1899, Buencamino was among those lobbying for the acceptance of American rule.

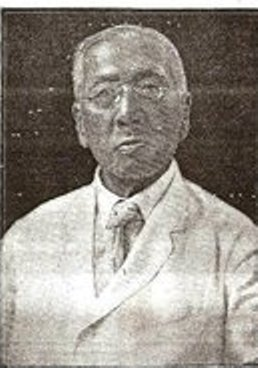
Buencamino in later years

United States Secretary of State John Hay had sent a telegram to the Schurman Commission enabling it to offer the Filipinos autonomy under American authority, but Mabini was against it and favored independence under American protection. Buencamino, Pedro Paterno, and other powerful Malolos Congress members passed a resolution requesting that Aguinaldo disavow Mabini's position and remove him as prime minister. Under duress, Aguinaldo formed a new cabinet. Paterno replaced Mabini, while Buencamino was promoted as Secretary of Foreign Relations and concurrently the Secretary of Welfare.

In one of their cabinet meetings, General Antonio Luna allegedly slapped Buencamino and called him a coward. Although, this was personally refuted in writing by President Emilio Aguinaldo when he was visited by Felipe Buencamino's son and grandson, Victor Buencamino Sr. and Victor Buencamino Jr., to ask if the incident truly did take place. Aguinaldo assured them it was not true and that Luna merely threw a chair in Buencamino's direction. Aguinaldo wrote and signed a letter for Felipe's grandson to confirm this and it is still in his possession to this day. He and Luna had another confrontation in Cabanatuan on June 5, 1899, just before Luna and his aide Colonel Francisco Roman were killed, and Eduardo Rusca, one of Luna's aides was arrested.

When Buencamino and Paterno formed a group known as the "Pacificados" and organized the Asociación de Paz (League for Peace), the Philippine–American War was still raging. The goal was to aid General Elwell Otis' pacification campaign and clear the way for American authority. Among its prominent members were Trinidad Pardo de Tavera, Leon Ma. Guerrero, Cayetano Arellano, Rafael Palma, Tomas del Rosario, Justo Lukban and Pascual H. Poblete. In December 1900, the league changed its name to Partido Federal whose aim was statehood for the Philippines. The party dominated politics for a while until 1907 when their opponents, the Nacionalistas, who advocated independence, took control of the Philippine Assembly. Buencamino died on February 6, 1929.

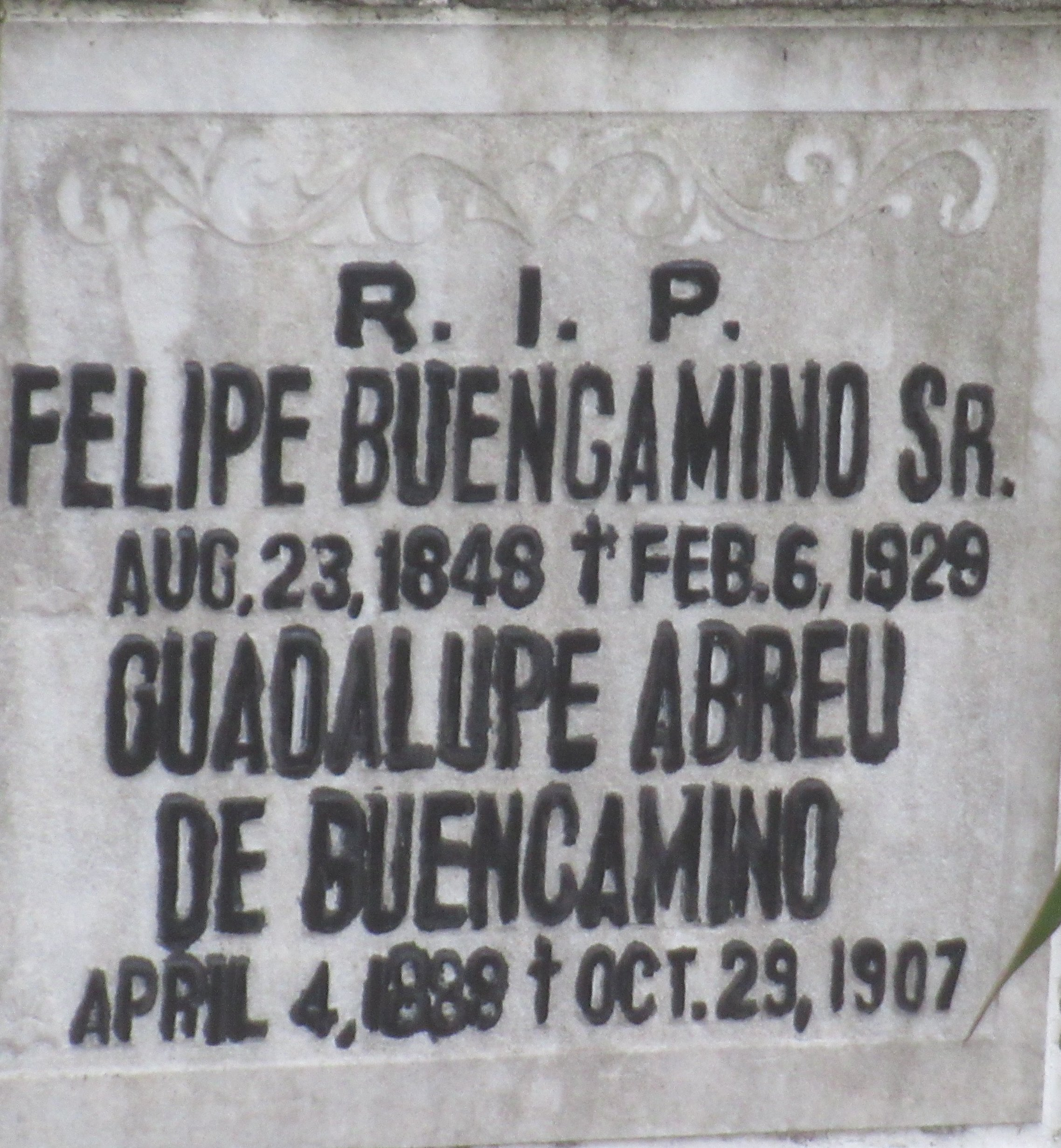
Buencamino & Guadalupe Salazar Abreu s grave at Manila North Cemetery.

== Personal life ==
Buencamino was married to Juana Arnedo and had ten children. After she died in 1883, Buencamino married Guadalupe Salazar Abreu, who he had three sons, Victor, Felipe Jr., and Philip. Buencamino is interred at the Manila North Cemetery.

== In popular culture ==
- Portrayed by Joonee Gamboa in the film El Presidente (2012).
- Portrayed by Nonie Buencamino in the films Heneral Luna (2015) and its sequel, Goyo: The Boy General (2018).
- Portrayed by Tommy Alejandrino in the film GomBurZa (2023).
