= Patricio N. Abinales =

Filipino historian

Patricio Nunez Abinales (born 1955), sometimes known as Jojo Abinales is a Filipino historian and political scientis.

== Early life and education ==
Born in Ozamiz City in Northern Mindanao during the mid-1950s, Abinales had a chance to experience the social upheavals that came with Ferdinand Marcos' declaration of Martial Law in September 1972, and the rise of the Moro National Liberation Front later that same year. He then earned a Bachelor of Arts degree in history from the University of the Philippines Diliiman in 1978. He eventually also received a master's degree from the Cornell University Department of Government in 1991, and a PhD in Government and Asian Studies, also from Cornell, in 1997.

== Career ==
He is best known for his writings and expertise on Southeast Asian and Philippine political history in general, and local Mindanao power dynamics and the history of communist movements in the Philippines in particular.

His most influential book, "State and Society in the Philippines," which he co-wrote with Donna J. Amoroso in 2017, is considered a key textbook in Philippine political history, and his other books on Philippine history have also won various awards. Outside the academe, he is well known as a writer and commentator for Manila-based news website Rappler and San Francisco based online magazine Positively Filipino.

== Awards ==
Abinales' 2001 University of the Philippines Press book "Fellow Traveler: Essays on Filipino Communism" won the Philippines' National Book Award for the Social Sciences in 2001, and the book "The Marcos Era: A Reader," which he co-authored with Leia Castañeda Anastacio, was a finalist for the 2023 National Book Award for Best Book on History.
