= 2022 Rizal local elections =

Philippine election

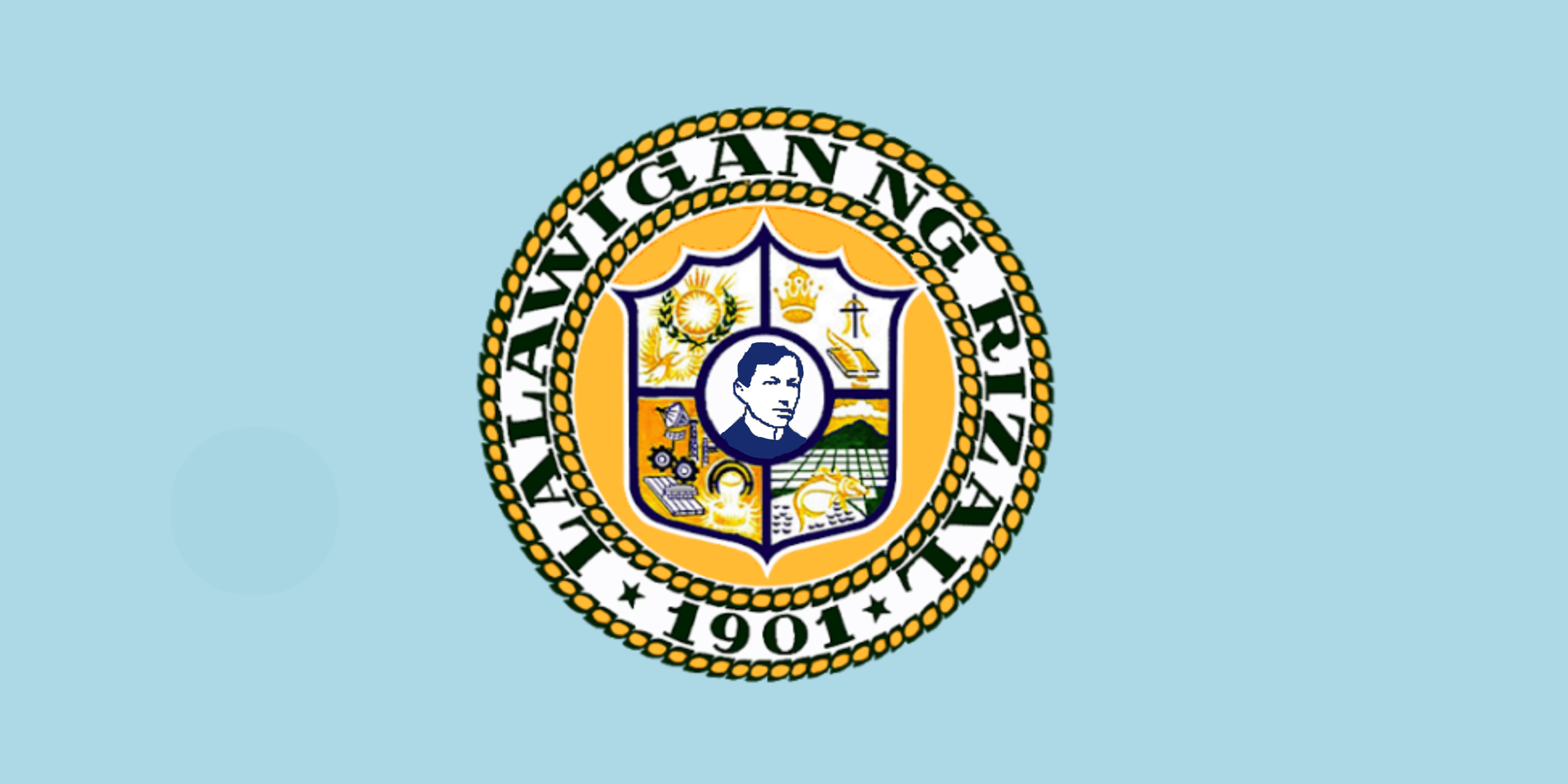
- May 9, 2022
- Gubernatorial election
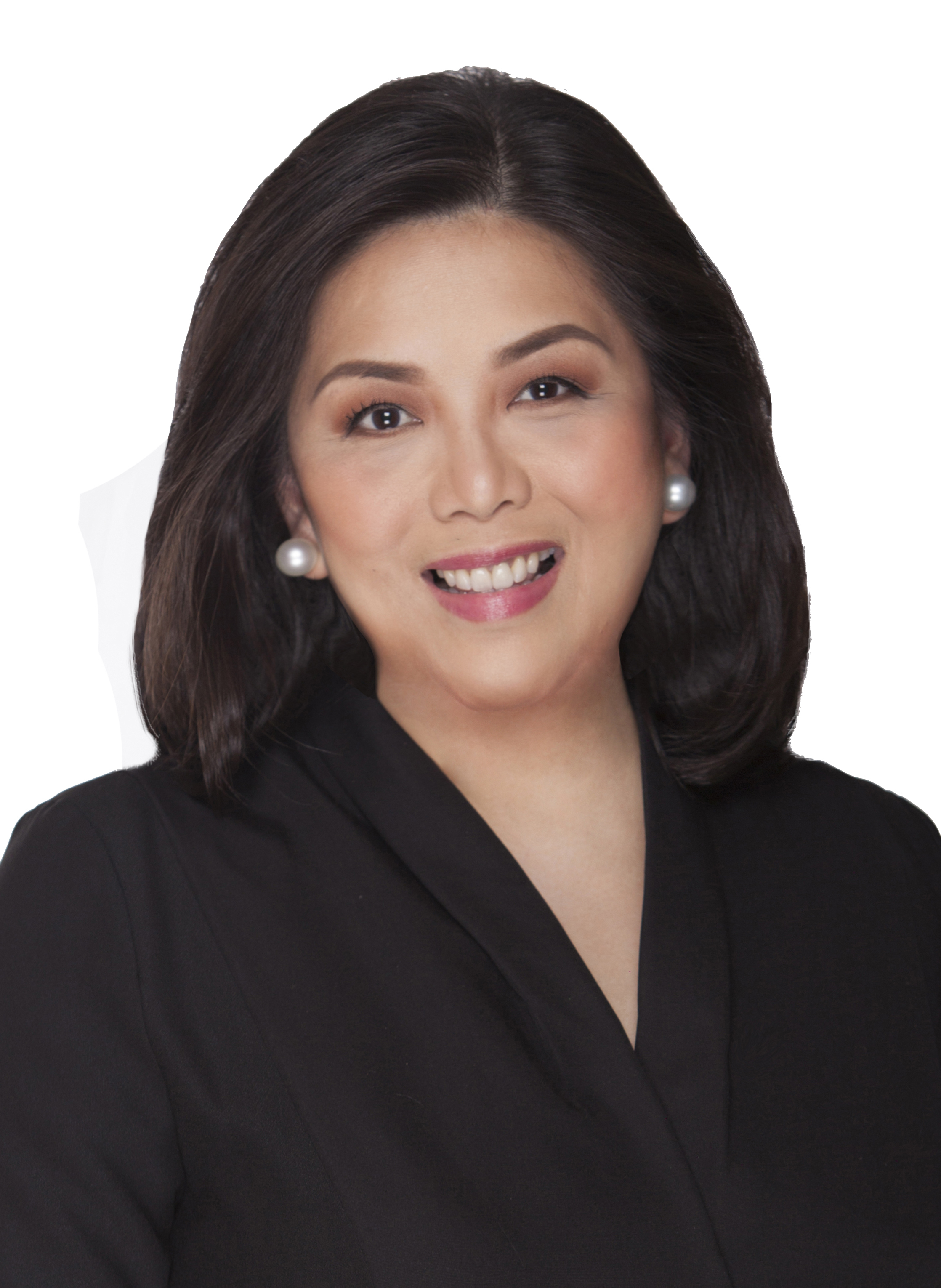
		IND
Candidate	Nina Ynares	Andrew Sumulong
Party	NPC	Independent
Running mate	Reynaldo San Juan Jr.
Popular vote	951,315	95,670
Percentage	85.52%	8.60%
- A map showing the results of the Rizal gubernatorial election per city and municipality
Governor before election
Rebecca Ynares
NPC
Elected Governor
Nina Ynares
NPC
- Vice gubernatorial election
	PFP	PDDS
Candidate	Reynaldo San Juan Jr.	Sonny Clemente
Party	PFP	PDDS
Popular vote	514,704	207,735
Percentage	56.54%	22.82%
	IND
Candidate	Patrick Ken Felix
Party	Independent
Popular vote	160,763
Percentage	17.66%
Vice governor before election
Reynaldo San Juan Jr.
PFP
Elected Vice governor
Reynaldo San Juan Jr.
PFP
- Provincial board election

10 of 14 seats in the Rizal Provincial Board 8 seats needed for a majority
	First party	Second party	Third party
Party	NPC	PDP–Laban	NUP
Last election	6 seats, 46.99%	Did not participate	1 seat, 4.85%
Seats won	8	1	1
Seat change	▲2	▲1	Steady
Popular vote	1,143,130	118,460	109,364
Percentage	68.58%	7.11%	6.56%
	Fourth party
Party	PROMDI
Last election	Did not participate
Seats won	0
Seat change	Steady
Popular vote	131,962
Percentage	7.92%

Local elections were held in the Rizal on May 9, 2022, as part of the 2022 general elections. Voters selected candidates for all local positions: a municipal/city mayor, vice mayor and town councilors, as well as members of the Sangguniang Panlalawigan, the governor, vice-governor and representatives for the four districts of Rizal.

== Background ==
Governor Rebecca "Nini" Ynares was term-limited and illegible to run. Initially, her husband, Presidential Adviser for Southern Tagalog and former Governor Casimiro "Ito" Ynares Jr., was supposed to run, but was later substituted by their daughter, GSIS Board of Trustee Nina Ricci Ynares. Other candidates for governor were Andrew Sumulong, Jose Velasco, Benedict Angeles, and Fernando Dizon.

Vice Governor ran for third and final term. He faced other candidates Sonny Clemente, Patrick Ken Felix, and Ricky Juan Balauro.

== Results ==
=== For Governor ===
Nina Ricci Ynares won the elections.

Rizal Gubernatorial Election
Party	Candidate	Votes	%
NPC	Nina Ricci Ynares	951,315	85.52
Independent	Andrew Sumulong	95,670	8.60
Independent	Jose Velasco	28,711	2.58
Independent	Benedict Angeles	25,022	2.25
PGRP	Fernando Dizon	11,614	1.04
Total votes		1,112,332	100.00
NPC hold			

=== For Vice Governor ===
Vice Governor Reynaldo "Junrey" San Juan Jr. defeated his closest rivals, Sonny Clemente of PDDS and independent Patrick Ken Felix, with 207,735 and 160,763 votes respectively.

Rizal Vice Gubernatorial election
Party	Candidate	Votes	%
PFP	Reynaldo "Junrey" San Juan Jr.	514,704	56.54
PDDS	Sonny Clemente	207,735	22.82
Independent	Patrick Ken Felix	160,763	17.66
WPP	Ricky Juan Balauro	27,158	2.98
Total votes		910,360	100.00
PFP hold			

=== For Representative ===
==== First District ====
Rep. Michael John "Jack" Duavit won unopposed.

2022 Philippine House of Representatives election in Rizal's 1st district
Party	Candidate	Votes	%
NPC	Michael John "Jack" Duavit	308,707	100.00
Total votes		308,707	100.00
NPC hold			

==== Second District ====
Board Member Emigdio Tanjuatco III won the election.

2022 Philippine House of Representatives election in Rizal's 2nd district
Party	Candidate	Votes	%
Liberal	Emigdio "Dino" Tanjuatco III	166,361	81.08
PDP–Laban	Omar Mohammad Fajardo	38,816	18.92
Total votes		205,177	100.00
Liberal gain from Lakas			

==== Third District ====
Former Metropolitan Manila Development Authority General Manager Jose Arturo "Jojo" Garcia Jr. won against former San Mateo Mayor Cristina Diaz.

2022 Philippine House of Representatives election in Rizal's 3rd district
Party	Candidate	Votes	%
NPC	Jose Arturo "Jojo" Garcia Jr.	48,640	53.33
PDP–Laban	Cristina Diaz	36,673	40.21
Aksyon	Ma. Cristina Diaz	5,894	6.46
Total votes		91,207	100.00
NPC win (new seat)			

==== Fourth District ====
Rep. Juan Fidel Felipe Nograles defeated his predecessor, former Rep. Isidro Rodriguez Jr.

2022 Philippine House of Representatives election in Rizal's 4th district
Party	Candidate	Votes	%
Lakas	Juan Fidel Felipe Nograles	92,176	58.83
NPC	Isidro Rodriguez Jr.	32,955	21.03
PFP	Bonna Aquino Sanguyo	31,550	20.14
Total votes		156,721	100.00
Lakas win (new seat)			

==== Antipolo's First District ====
Rep. Roberto "Robbie" Puno was re-elected.

2022 Philippine House of Representatives election in Antipolo's 1st district
Party	Candidate	Votes	%
NUP	Roberto "Robbie" Puno	131,611	93.87
Independent	Salvador Abaño	5,150	3.67
Independent	Javez Tibio	3,452	2.46
Total votes		140,213	100.00
NUP hold			

==== Antipolo's Second District ====
The seat was vacant upon the death of former representative Resureccion "Cion" Acop. Acop's husband former representative Romeo "Romy" Acop ran and won unopposed.

2022 Philippine House of Representatives election in Antipolo's 2nd district
Party	Candidate	Votes	%
NUP	Romeo "Romy" Acop	132,519	100.00
Total votes		132,519	100.00
NUP hold			

=== For Provincial Board Members ===
All 4 Districts of Rizal and all 2 districts of Antipolo elected members of the Rizal Provincial Board.

Party	Votes	%	Seats
Nationalist People's Coalition	1,143,130	68.58	8
Progressive Movement for the Devolution of Initiatives	131,962	7.92	–
Partido Demokratiko Pilipino-Lakas ng Bayan	118,460	7.11	1
National Unity Party	109,364	6.56	1
Aksyon Demokratiko	29,796	1.79	–
Pederalismo ng Dugong Dakilang Samahan	4,209	0.25	–
Independent	129,949	7.80	0
Ex officio seats			3
Reserved seats			1
Total	1,666,870	100.00	14

==== First District ====
- Municipalities: Angono, Binangonan, Cainta, Taytay

All incumbents are running for re-election, except for former Vice Governor and Board Member Anthony Jesus "Jestoni" Alarcon who decided not to seek for another term despite being qualified to do so, hinting at returning to being a full-time actor instead. Angono municipal councilor Jo Anne Saguinsin ran in his place.

Rizal 1st District Board Member election
Party	Candidate	Votes	%
NPC	Genato "Dok Ato" Bernardo	221,006	17.04
NPC	Fernando "Jun" Cabitac Jr.	214,327	16.52
NPC	Jo Anne Saguinsin	191,615	14.77
NPC	Ross Glenn Gongora	183,530	14.15
PROMDI	Julio Narag	131,962	10.17
Total votes		942,440	100.00

==== Second District ====
- Municipalities: Baras, Cardona, Jala-Jala, Morong, Pililla, Tanay, Teresa

On March 25, 2021, President Rodrigo Duterte signed the Republic Act 11533, "An Act Reappropriating the Second Legislative District of the Province of Rizal Into Three Legislative Districts". San Mateo and Rodriguez (Montalban) will become Third and Fourth District, respectively.

Board Member Emigidio Tanjuatco III ran for representative. Ricardo Bernados and Hector Robles of NPC won the elections.

Rizal 2nd District Board Member election
Party	Candidate	Votes	%
NPC	Ricardo Bernados	91,130	7.03
NPC	Hector Robles	88,344	6.81
Independent	Emmanuel Mendiola	54,968	4.24
Independent	Lorenzo Santos Sr.	33,371	2.57
Independent	Ronald Briones	18,327	1.41
Total votes		286,140	100.00

==== Third District ====
- Municipality: San Mateo

On March 25, 2021, President Rodrigo Duterte signed the Republic Act 11533, " An Act Reappropriating the Second Legislative District of the Province of Rizal Into Three Legislative Districts". San Mateo and Rodriguez (Montalban) will become Third and Fourth District, respectively.

Board member Bartolome "Omie" Rivera Jr., who hailed from San Mateo, ran as mayor. His party's nominee was John Patrick Bautista. Board member Rolando Rivera, who also hailed from San Mateo, was term limited and died on March 24, 2022.

John Patrick Bautista won the elections.

Rizal 3rd District Board Member election
Party	Candidate	Votes	%
NPC	John Patrick Bautista	41,651	3.21
PDP–Laban	Hermenegildo Cequeña	30,429	2.35
Aksyon	Cirilo Oropesa Jr.	6,183	0.48
Total votes		78,263	100.00
NPC win (new seat)			

==== Fourth District ====
- Municipality: Rodriguez (Montalban)

On March 25, 2021, President Rodrigo Duterte signed the Republic Act 11533, "An Act Reappropriating the Second Legislative District of the Province of Rizal Into Three Legislative Districts". San Mateo and Rodriguez (Montalban) will become Third and Fourth District, respectively.

Board Member Rommel Ayuson, who hailed from Rodriguez won the elections.

Rizal 4th District Board Member election
Party	Candidate	Votes	%
PDP–Laban	Rommel Ayuson	88,031	6.79
Aksyon	Lemuel Valdeavilla	23,613	1.82
Independent	Celso Ocampo	7,843	0.60
Independent	Alberto Lago	4,727	0.36
PDDS	Benjamin Pascual	4,209	0.32
Independent	Percival Sanchez	3,032	0.23
Independent	Jose Malapo Jr.	2,926	0.23
Independent	Jose Cordova Sr.	2,790	0.22
Independent	Ritchie Fuentes	1,965	0.15
Total votes		139,136	100.00
PDP–Laban win (new seat)			

==== Antipolo's First District ====
Rep. Roberto Andres "Randy" Puno Jr., son of former Representatives Roberto Puno and Chiqui Roa-Puno won unopposed.

Rizal Provincial Board election at Antipolo's 1st district
Party	Candidate	Votes	%
NUP	Roberto Andres "Randy" Puno Jr.	109,364	100.00
Total votes		109,364	100.00
NUP hold			

==== Antipolo's Second District ====
Board Member Alexander "Bobot" Marquez sought comeback to city council. His party chosen former Mayor Danilo "Nilo" Leyble, ran and won a fresh first term unopposed.

Rizal Provincial Board election at Antipolo's 2nd district
Party	Candidate	Votes	%
NPC	Danilo "Nilo" Leyble	111,527	100.00
Total votes		111,527	100.00
NPC hold			

== City and Municipal Elections ==
All municipalities and City of Antipolo in Rizal will elect mayor and vice-mayor this election. The candidates for mayor and vice mayor with the highest number of votes wins the seat; they are voted separately, therefore, they may be of different parties when elected. Below is the list of mayoralty and vice-mayoralty candidates of each city and municipalities per district.

=== First District ===
==== Angono ====
Mayor Jeri Mae Calderon won her second term unopposed.

Angono mayoral election
Party	Candidate	Votes	%
NPC	Jeri Mae Calderon	47,058	100.00
Total votes		47,058	100.00

Vice Mayor Gerry Calderon defeated former Councilor Januver Tiamson, son of former Mayor Saturnino Tiamson.

Angono vice mayoral election
Party	Candidate	Votes	%
NPC	Gerardo "Gerry" Calderon	39,019	74.78
Independent	Januver Tiamson	13,159	25.22
Total votes		52,178	100.00

==== Binangonan ====
Mayor Cesar Ynares was re-elected for third and final term unopposed.

Binangonan mayoral election
Party	Candidate	Votes	%
NPC	Cesar Ynares	84,614	100.00
Total votes		84,614	100.00

Vice Mayor Cecilio "Boyet" Ynares defeated Manuel Reyes Sr.

Binangonan vice mayoral election
Party	Candidate	Votes	%
NPC	Cecilio "Boyet" Ynares	71,445	77.04
Independent	Manuel Reyes Sr.	21,294	22.96
Total votes		92,739	100.00

==== Cainta ====
Maria Elenita Nieto, wife of Mayor Johnielle Keith Nieto defeated Alvin Patrimonio.

Cainta mayoral election
Party	Candidate	Votes	%
NPC	Maria Elenita Nieto	107,268	80.63
Lakas	Alvin Patrimonio	25,772	19.37
Total votes		133,040	100.00

Vice Mayor Ace Servillon defeated former Mayor Mon Ilagan.

Cainta vice mayoral election
Party	Candidate	Votes	%
NPC	Ace Servillon	100,118	77.87
PROMDI	Ramon Ilagan	28,455	22.13
Total votes		128,573	100.00

==== Taytay ====
Allan Martine De Leon, Barangay Captain of Barangay Dolores, defeated Mayor George Ricardo "Joric" Gacula.

Taytay mayoral election
Party	Candidate	Votes	%
NPC	Allan Martine De Leon	66,738	53.62
Nacionalista	George Ricardo "Joric" Gacula	49,767	39.98
Independent	Adan De Leon	5,544	4.45
Independent	Efren Andres	1,034	0.83
WPP	Edwin Cayetano	852	0.68
KBL	Mohaimen Guinal	530	0.43
Total votes		124,465	100.00

Municipal Councilor Sophia Priscilla "Pia" Cabral defeated Vice Mayor Michell "Mitch" Bermundo.

Taytay vice mayoral election
Party	Candidate	Votes	%
PDP–Laban	Sophia Priscilla "Pia" Cabral	58,162	47.41
Nacionalista	Michell "Mitch" Bermudo	42,381	34.55
Independent	Eljun Victor	15,822	12.90
Independent	Renato Bueno	3,767	3.07
KBL	Nolasco Mendoza	2,541	2.07
Total votes		122,673	100.00

=== Second District ===
==== Baras ====
Vice Mayor and former Mayor Wilfredo "Willy" Robles won the elections.

Baras mayoral election
Party	Candidate	Votes	%
PDP–Laban	Wilfredo "Willy" Robles	22,702	74.85
PPM	Roberto Ferrera	3,998	13.18
Katipunan Pamilya Pilipino	Crisostomo Dilidili	2,367	7.80
PROMDI	Danny Coronel	1,261	4.16
Total votes		30,328	100.00

Mayor and former Vice Mayor Kathrine "KC" Robles won the elections.

Baras vice mayoral election
Party	Candidate	Votes	%
NPC	Kathrine "KC" Robles	24,493	84.43
PROMDI	Elvesa Magos	1,725	5.95
Katipunan Pamilya Pilipino	Rizaldy Mayor	1,041	3.59
Independent	Fernando Bacolod	914	3.15
PPM	Jimmy Domenia	837	2.89
Total votes		29,010	100.00

==== Cardona ====
Former Mayor Bernardo "Jun" San Juan Jr. defeated Mayor Teodulo "Totoy" Campo.

Cardona mayoral election
Party	Candidate	Votes	%
NPC	Bernardo "Jun" San Juan Jr.	14,361	53.93
Liberal	Teodulo "Totoy" Campo	12,270	46.07
Total votes		26,631	100.00

Vice Mayor Gil Pandac defeated Councilor Al Jerold "Deyong" San Jose.

Cardona vice mayoral election
Party	Candidate	Votes	%
PDP–Laban	Gil Pandac	13,950	54.99
Liberal	Al Jerold San Jose	11,420	45.01
Total votes		25,370	100.00

==== Jala-Jala ====
Mayor Elmer Pillas defeated former Mayor Narciso "Narcing" Villaran for the second time.

Jala-Jala mayoral election
Party	Candidate	Votes	%
NPC	Elmer Pillas	9,720	51.42
PDP–Laban	Narciso Villaran	9,183	48.58
Total votes		18,903	100.00

Vice Mayor Jose "Jolet" Delos Santos died on March 31, 2020. He was replaced by First Councilor Harry Añago. Acting Vice Mayor Harry Añago won a fresh first term as Vice Mayor.

Jala-Jala vice mayoral election
Party	Candidate	Votes	%
NPC	Harry Añago	9,530	51.56
Liberal	Ramil Escarmosa	8,753	47.36
PDSP	Renz Mañago	199	1.08
Total votes		18,482	100.00

==== Morong ====
Sidney Soriano defeated his closest rivals Vice Mayor Julian De Ungria and former Vice Mayor Joseph Buenaventura

Morong mayoral election
Party	Candidate	Votes	%
PDP–Laban	Sidney Soriano	15,906	45.90
UNA	Julian De Ungria	9,642	27.82
Liberal	Joseph Buenaventura	8,718	25.16
Independent	Medel Victorio	391	1.13
Total votes		34,657	100.00

Jose Fred Feliciano Jr. defeated Councilor Harold Pascual.

Morong vice mayoral election
Party	Candidate	Votes	%
PDP–Laban	Jose Fred Feliciano Jr.	13,999	42.26
UNA	Harold Pascual	11,107	33.53
NPC	Tulisan Ramos	7,506	22.66
Independent	Florencio De Rosas	517	1.56
Total votes		33,129	100.00

==== Pililla ====
Mayor Dan Masinsin defeated former Mayor Leandro Masikip Sr.

Pililla mayoral election
Party	Candidate	Votes	%
PDP–Laban	Dan Masinsin	21,016	65.82
Nacionalista	Leandro Masikip, Sr.	9,434	29.54
Reporma	Joselito Aquino	1,113	3.49
PROMDI	Rodelio Olaya	277	0.87
Independent	Willy Sia	91	0.28
Total votes		31,931	100.00

Vice Mayor Rafael "Paeng" Carpio was defeated by Jaime Paz.

Pililla vice mayoral election
Party	Candidate	Votes	%
Independent	Jaime Paz	11,415	36.57
PDP–Laban	Rafael "Paeng" Carpio	10,710	34.31
Nacionalista	Jordan Olea	6,412	20.54
PFP	Ronnie Bias	1,959	6.28
Reporma	Noel Abogado	544	1.74
Independent	Lorna Bondoc	178	0.57
Total votes		31,218	100.00

==== Tanay ====
Vice Mayor Rafael Tanjuatco successfully sought mayoral comeback.

Tanay mayoral election
Party	Candidate	Votes	%
PDP–Laban	Rafael Tanjuatco	27,400	49.69
Independent	Carlos Inofre Jr.	19,599	35.54
Independent	Rafael Reyes	3,805	6.90
PRP	Jessica Linog	2,959	5.37
Independent	Jose Benavidez	799	1.45
Independent	Fausto Briones	310	0.56
Independent	Melchor Blaza	269	0.49
Total votes		55,141	100.00

Mayor Rex Manuel Tanjuatco successfully sought vice-mayoral comeback.

Tanay vice mayoral election
Party	Candidate	Votes	%
PDP–Laban	Rex Manuel Tanjuatco	23,992	45.11
PRP	Lois Nell Joy Tica	12,405	23.32
Independent	Eri Ver Gaston	11,561	21.74
Independent	Benencio Catolos	3,337	6.27
Independent	Rolando Tacadino	1,890	3.55
Total votes		53,185	100.00

==== Teresa ====
Former Mayor Rodel Dela Cruz defeated Vice Mayor Jose Jeriel Villegas and Chairman Romualdo Coralde.

Teresa mayoral election
Party	Candidate	Votes	%
Aksyon	Rodel Dela Cruz	17,257	45.97
PDP–Laban	Jose Jeriel Villegas	11,827	31.51
PFP	Romualdo Coralde	8,453	22.52
Total votes		37,537	100.00

Former Councilor Freddie Bonifacio defeated Mayor Raul Palino and former Councilor Gilbert Bernardino.

Teresa Vice Mayoral Election
Party	Candidate	Votes	%
Aksyon	Freddie Bonifacio	16,547	45.99
PDP–Laban	Raul Palino	12,461	34.63
NPC	Gilbert Bernardino	6,975	19.38
Total votes		35,983	100.00

=== Third District ===
==== San Mateo ====
Former Mayor and Vice mayor Jose Rafael Diaz was defeated by Board Member and former Vice Mayor Bartolome "Omie" Rivera.

San Mateo mayoral election
Party	Candidate	Votes	%
Liberal	Bartolome "Omie" Rivera Jr.	56,110	60.46
PDP–Laban	Jose Rafael Diaz	36,695	39.54
Total votes		92,805	100.00

Councilor Jaime "Jimmy" Roxas defeated Ariel Diaz.

San Mateo vice mayoral election
Party	Candidate	Votes	%
PDP–Laban	Jimmy Roxas	45,951	52.30
Aksyon	Ariel Diaz	41,909	47.70
Total votes		87,860	100.00

=== Fourth District ===
==== Rodriguez (Montalban) ====
Karen Mae "Mayet" Hernandez, sister of Mayor Dennis Hernandez, was defeated by Ronnie Evangelista.

Rodriguez (Montalban) mayoral election
Party	Candidate	Votes	%
PDP–Laban	Ronnie Evangelista	77,141	48.23
NPC	Karen Mae "Mayet" Hernandez	74,358	46.49
PRP	Felicisimo Salvador Jr.	3,486	2.18
Independent	Johnrey Quiñones	2,052	1.28
PDDS	Anecito Lizaran	1,142	0.71
PROMDI	Nelson Pascual	1,034	0.65
Independent	Federico Roxas II	725	0.45
Total votes		159,938	100.00

Councilor Edgardo "Umpek" Sison won the vice-mayoral race.

Rodriguez (Montalban) vice mayoral election
Party	Candidate	Votes	%
NPC	Edgardo "Umpek" Sison	60,245	38.83
Aksyon	Michael Roy Cuerpo	51,232	33.02
PDP–Laban	Jose Caparas Jr.	31,967	20.60
Independent	Pastor Asinas	4,120	2.66
Independent	Cristell Ku	2,759	1.78
Independent	Basilio Hermosa	2,056	1.33
PDDS	Herminio Balinas	1,566	1.01
Independent	Elmer Amor	1,199	0.77
Total votes		155,144	100.00

=== Antipolo ===
Mayor Andrea Bautista-Ynares supposedly ran for mayor. Later, she dropped her candidacy and replaced by her husband, Former Governor and Mayor Casimiro "Jun" Ynares III. Ynares successfully sought mayoral comeback.

Antipolo mayoral election
Party	Candidate	Votes	%
NPC	Casimiro "Jun" Ynares III	253,549	81.43
Independent	Teddy Leyble	33,019	10.60
Independent	Pedro Leyble	11,401	3.66
Independent	Herminio Sanchez	7,576	2.43
Independent	Wilfredo Gelacio Sr.	5,829	1.87
Total votes		311,374	100.00

Vice Mayor Josefina "Pining" Gatlabayan was re-elected for third and final term.

Antipolo vice mayoral election
Party	Candidate	Votes	%
NPC	Josefina "Pining" Gatlabayan	241,996	82.86
Independent	Manuel Relorcasa	20,270	6.94
Independent	Edwin Reyes	16,749	5.73
Independent	Joel Ronquillo	13,037	4.46
Total votes		292,052	100.00
