= Trinidad Pardo de Tavera =

Filipino historian (1857–1925)

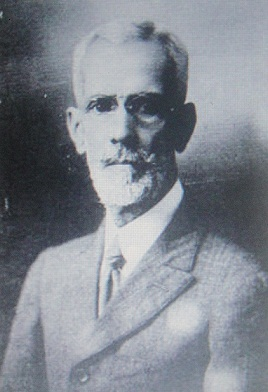

Deputy Prime Minister of the Philippines
- In office May 8, 1899 – November 13, 1899
- President: Emilio Aguinaldo
- Prime Minister: Pedro Paterno
- Preceded by: Position established
- Succeeded by: Position abolished (next held by Cesar Virata)

Member of the Malolos Congress from Cebu
- In office September 15, 1898 – November 13, 1899 Serving with Ariston Bautista, Francisco Makabulos, and Felix David

Personal details
- Born: Trinidad Hermenegildo José María Juan Francisco Pardo de Tavera y Gorricho; 13 April 1857 Escolta, Manila, Captaincy General of the Philippines
- Died: 26 March 1925 (aged 67) Manila, Philippine Islands
- Resting place: Père Lachaise Cemetery, Paris, France
- Party: Federalista
- Other political affiliations: Independent (1898–1900)
- Spouse: María de la Concepción Rosalía Cembrano y González-Calderón
- Children: Carlos Félix Pardo de Tavera y Cembrano Alfredo Antonio Pardo de Tavera y Cembrano María del Carmen Pardo de Tavera y Cembrano
- Parent(s): Félix Pardo de Tavera y Gómez-González; Juliana Gorricho y Santos
- Relatives: Juan VI Pardo de Tavera (ancestor); Félix Pardo de Tavera, hijo María de la Paz Pardo de Tavera de Luna (sister)
- Education: Colegio de San Juan de Letran (BA); University of Santo Tomas; University of Paris
- Occupation: Writer, physician, naturalist, historian

Trinidad Hermenegildo José María Juan Francisco Pardo de Tavera y Gorricho (13 April 1857 – 26 March 1925) was a Filipino physician, historian and politician of Spanish and Portuguese descent who served as Deputy Prime Minister of the First Philippine Republic in 1899.

Trinidad, also known by his name T. H. Pardo de Tavera, was known for his writings about different aspects of Philippine culture.

== Family ==
Trinidad was born on 13 April 1857 to Spanish lawyer and government official Félix Pardo de Tavera and Juliana Gorricho who hailed from a wealthy, illustrious Filipino family. The Pardos de Tavera had a long history. His father, Félix, descended from the Portuguese aristocratic family of Pardo from Tavira, Portugal. In late 1640s, the Pardos added the name de Tavera to affix their place of origin similar to Spanish noble customs. Among the notable members of the family were Juan Pardo de Tavera, who carried the title Marquis de Magahon, and Juan VI Pardo de Tavera, the Archbishop of Toledo, Primate of Spain and Grand Inquisitor of Spain during the reign of Emperor Charles V (and I of Spain). In 1825, Trinidad's grandfather and Félix's father, Julián Pardo de Tavera, set sail for Manila shortly after marrying a Spanish woman Juana María Gómez. Julián and Juana bore three children: Félix, Joaquín, and Carmen. Trinidad was the uncle of the architect Andrés Luna, who is the son of his sister Mari Paz Pardo de Tavera and the master painter Juan Luna.

The Pardos de Tavera lived in Cabildo St., Intramuros. Félix and Joaquín were sent to the University of Santo Tomas where they both graduated as bachelors of law. The brothers worked for the advisory council of the governor-general. They married sisters Juliana and Gertrudis Gorricho.

Juliana Gorricho Santos was the daughter of José María Dámaso de Gorricho y Doyle, a wealthy Spanish Filipino landowner in Manila and Cavite of Basque and Irish descent, and owner of country's largest money-lending company that time. José's father, Miguel Ignacio de Gorricho Esguerra, was a Spaniard from Pamplona who became the governor of Capiz province. Juliana's mother, Ciriaca de los Santos, was a Filipina entrepreneur from Cavite who made their family fortune by selling hay to horses used by the Spanish cavalry.

Félix Pardo de Tavera and Juliana Gorricho Santos bore three children: Trinidad, Félix, and María de la Paz, who would later marry renowned Filipino painter Juan Luna.

== Early life ==
Trinidad was known in his early years as Trini. He was identified as a "cuarteron" or a person who is three-fourths Spanish by blood. Their house in Cabildo street was just across the central square or plaza mayor, the Manila Cathedral and the government house or cabildo. In 1870, the government rented one of the wings of the Pardo de Tavera house to support the establishment of Academia de Dibujo y Pintura, the country's first state-supported school for drawing and painting.

In 1864, Trini's father Félix died. His uncle, Joaquín, still childless from his marriage to Gertrudis Gorricho, volunteered to become the adoptive father of Trini, Félix hijo and Carmen or Chiching. To fill Félix's post in the four-people Consejo de Administración, a royal order came to Manila offering the position to Joaquín. To sit in the Consejo was one of the highest honors in the Philippines during those times: he mingled with the highest officials of the country and was conferred into knighthood Order of Isabella the Catholic.

When the Glorious Revolution broke out in Spain in 1868 to overthrow Isabella II, Joaquín was named one of the assemblymen to push reforms in the Philippines. In 1869, they presented list of reforms to the liberal governor Carlos María de la Torre which outraged the peninsulares (or Spaniards born in mainland Spain). In 1871, de la Torre was replaced by Rafael de Izquierdo. In 1872, a mutiny broke out in Cavite and Joaquín was one of the alleged mutineers arrested by Izquierdo and was imprisoned in Fort Santiago. By 15 February 1872, Joaquín was sentenced to be deported in Guam. Three years later, his sentence was lifted and he was pardoned as one of the suspects of the mutiny. Because of the harassment and humiliation, Joaquín chose not to return to Manila, and reside together with his wife in Paris instead.

Trinidad was already a student at these times. He finished his primary and secondary education at Ateneo Municipal de Manila. He obtained his Bachelor of Arts degree in 1873 at Colegio de San Juan de Letran. By 1875, he was on his midway of his study of medicine at University of Santo Tomas when his uncle Joaquín, sent an invitation for them to reside in Paris and pursue education in France.

== Life in Paris ==
In Paris, which was still plagued by the aftermath of the Franco-Prussian War and the Paris Commune that had happened around 1870 until 1871, Pardos de Tavera befriended many powerful French politicians, including Prime Minister Léon Gambetta and presidents Maurice de MacMahon and Jules Grévy. Pardos de Tavera made a living by receiving the income made by their real properties left in the Philippines.

Trinidad enrolled at the University of Paris to continue his degree in medicine. One of his prominent professors was Étienne Stéphane Tarnier (1828–1897), an obstetrician and one of the pioneers of introducing Pasteur and Lister's theories in obstetrics. While at the university, he met Louise Ivanovna Krilof and Maria Nikolaevna Lujine, Russian Nihilists. During a visit to one of them, Trinidad learned the ideas of the Nihilist movement and shared his own experience of repression while in the Philippines.

In 1880, Trinidad received his licentiate in medicine at the Faculté de Médecine de Paris and in 1881, his bachelor in medicine. In mid-1880s, he enrolled in École nationale des langues orientales vivantes (now Institut national des langues et civilisations orientales) and took courses under Pierre Étienne Lazare Favre. In December 1885, he received his diploma in the Malay language. While studying in Paris, he tracked down rare collections of books and maps about the Philippines, its culture, tradition and history. He submitted medical articles to various journals, one of them an article about Pott's disease in 1881 published in El Siglo Médico in Madrid. In 1884, he sent an article about faith and folk healing in Luzon to Paris' Journal médecine. In 1886, he published his thesis Contribution a l'etude de la periarthrite du genou (Affections de la bourse sereuse de la patte d'oie) or Contribution to the Study of Periarthritis of the Knee (Diseases of the Bursa of Crow's Feet).

While a student at the École nationale, he wrote Contribución para el estudio de los antiguos alfabetos Filipinos (Contribution to the study of ancient Filipino alphabet) in 1884 which was published in Lausanne and El sánscrito en la lengua tagala in 1887. El sánscrito investigates the etymology and influence of the Sanskrit family of languages to Filipino grammar and orthography. Jose Rizal lamented after the publication of the El sánscrito en la lengua tagala that "I envy Pardo de Tavera's knowledge of Sanskrit." In 1886, he joined several linguistic societies such as Société académique indo-chinoise (Indo-Chinese Academic Society), Société hespagnole d'hygiène (Spanish Society of Hygiene) and Société d'anthrologie (Anthropologic Society). His papers Contribución para el estudio and El sánscrito were later lauded by overseas research journals and publications such as the Journal of the Asiatic Society of Bengal and Journal of the Straits Branch of the Royal Asiatic Society.

== Career ==
He was recognized as the first Filipino to publish a medical article in a professional journal, as he wrote down La medicine a l'Ile de Luzon, Archipel des Philippine.

He was also appointed by President Emilio Aguinaldo to become the Director of the Division on Diplomacy which he accepted and executed the functions of until October 30, 1898 when he resigned due to his conflicting stance with Mabini and Aguinaldo that the Philippines should pursue an immediate independence.

In 1901, he published a report entitled Etimologia de los nombres de razas de Filipinas which is about the etymological origins of the names of races found in the Philippines. The work was dedicated to Professor Dean Worcester, who was head of the medical and zoological division in the Philippines at that time.

In 1906, he published a Reseña histórica de Filipinas desde su descubrimiento hasta 1903, in Manila. However, it was condemned by the religious sector, primarily by a Dominican priest, Fr. Serapio Tamayo. He mocked Pardo by stating that he was of "mediocre intelligence."

Ferdinand Blumentritt stressed out that he and Rizal were "the only learned scholars of Malaysia produced by Spain."

During the American occupation, Trinidad was hailed as the "interpreter of American intentions towards the Philippines" and as the "right-hand man of Governor Taft in the establishment of civil government." He always envisioned the Philippines being admitted into the "American union" since from the very start, he was very convinced that an independent Philippine state was not the most "dignified" option for the Filipinos.

== Personal life and beliefs ==
Trinidad Pardo de Tavera, during his stay at Paris, was immersed through a plethora of works, since he could understand different languages such as Spanish, French, German, Italian, English and apparently, Russian. He read works by prominent figures such as Wilhelm von Humboldt, Abel de Remusat, Eugene Burnouf, Rudolf Virchow and Fedor Jagor. He was also an avid follower of the German philosopher Immanuel Kant. He was inspired by Kant's idea that reason is the source of morality, morality is the work of freedom and individual self-mastery is the very essence of a human being. His hatred of exclusiveness and privilege were credited as an Kantian influence. He also patterned Auguste Comte's societal evolution to that of the Philippines, from a "theological-military" stage towards a "positivistic-industrial" stage.

== Death ==
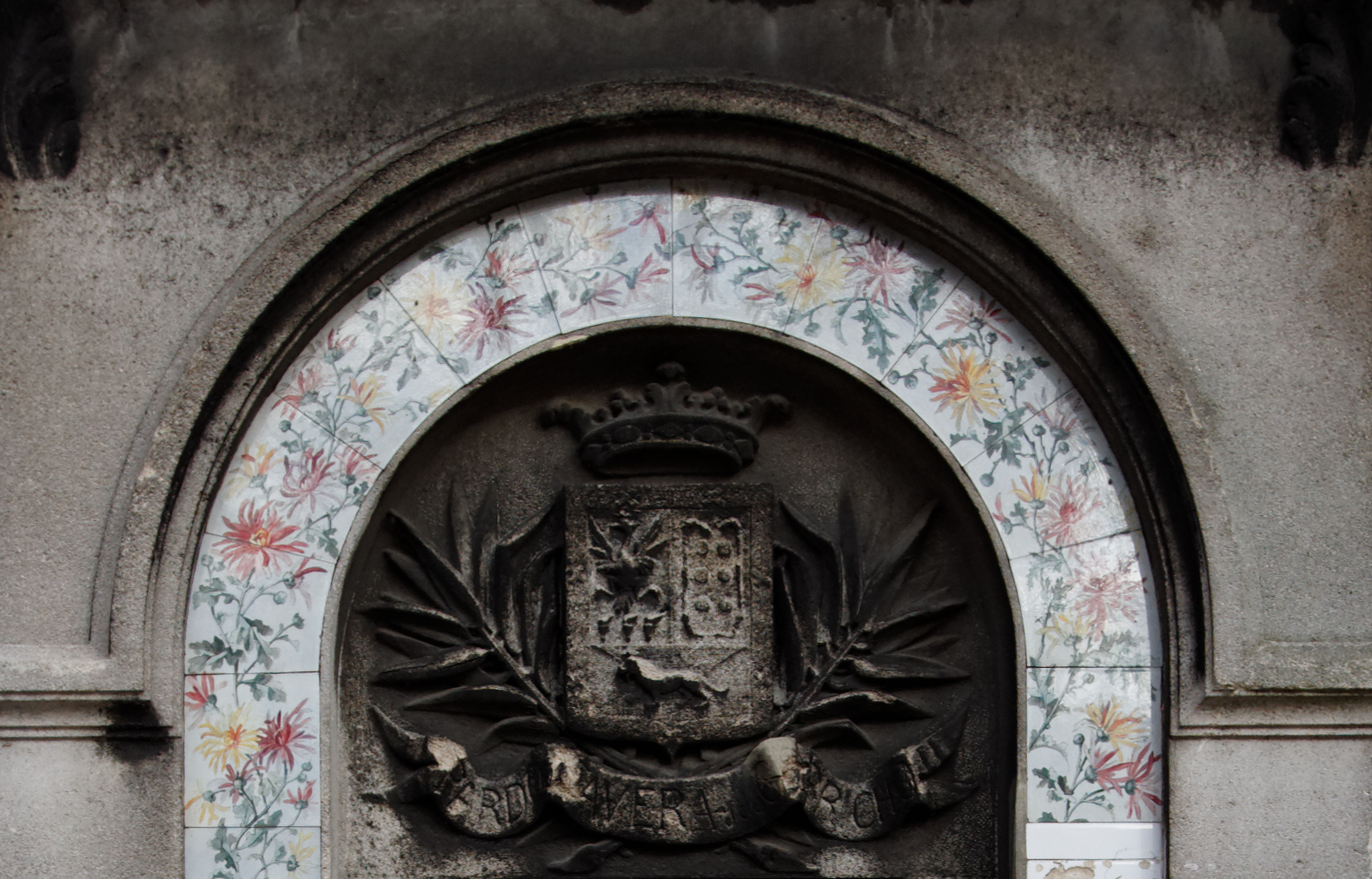
Grave of Pardo de Tavera at Père Lachaise Cemetery (detail: coat of arms)

On March 26, 1925, Trinidad died in his sleep in Manila. He was cremated and his ashes interred beside his mother's grave in Paris, France.
