= Federalista Party =

Defunct Pro-statehood party in the Philippines

Federalist Party Partido Federalista Partido Pederalista
- President: Trinidad Pardo de Tavera
- Founder: Pedro Paterno, Benito Legarda, Felipe Buencamino
- Founded: December 23, 1900
- Dissolved: 1907
- Succeeded by: Progresista Party
- Ideology: Pro-Statehood
- International affiliation: Republican

The Federalista Party (Spanish: Partido Federalista, Filipino: Partido Pederalista; lit. 'Federalist Party') was a political party in the Philippines during the First Philippine Republic and the Insular Government era. It was founded by prominent Filipino politicians such as, Pedro Paterno, Benito Legarda and Felipe Buencamino, among others. It advocated for the Philippines to become a U.S. state.

== History ==
After the cessation of hostilities in the Philippine–American War (then known as the "Philippine Insurrection"), political parties were allowed to be formed for the first time. The Partido Federalista was one of the first to be formed, on December 23, 1900. In the establishment of the Philippine Assembly, delegates such as Pedro Paterno, that pushed for Philippine statehood within the United States, formed the Partido Federalista the party was favored by the American insular government, which appointed delegates in the assembly. The Federalists elected Trinidad Pardo de Tavera as party president and dominated Manila politics. Their primary opponent were delegates that advocated immediate independence; these would later form the Nacionalista Party.

The manifesto of the party was then created by Florentino Torres. The party were composed of coalitions of various factions within Manila's ilustrados and political elites.

The Federalistas would later on dominate Philippine politics, winning in the 1902 and 1904 elections. During this time, the Federalistas received support from Governor-General William Howard Taft. The Federalistas controlled the Philippine Assembly until 1905 due to internal divisions and the later rise of the Nacionalista Party. The nationalists would wrest control of the assembly starting in 1907 when the first elections were held. At this point, the power of the Federalists waned, and their statehood platform was rescinded, and the party was named as the Progresista Party.

By 1907, colonial support had transitioned to a new generation of provincial political leaders, in favor of the Nacionalista Party (NP). Key figures such as Sergio Osmeña and Manuel Quezon emerged to challenge Pardo de Tavera and the Federalista Party. The NP went on to dominate electoral politics during the colonial period, establishing a predominant party system in the Philippines.
