= Calasiao Church =

Roman Catholic church in Pangasinan, Philippines

- Saints Peter and Paul Parish Church
- Iglesia Parroquial de los Santos Pedro y Pablo (Spanish)
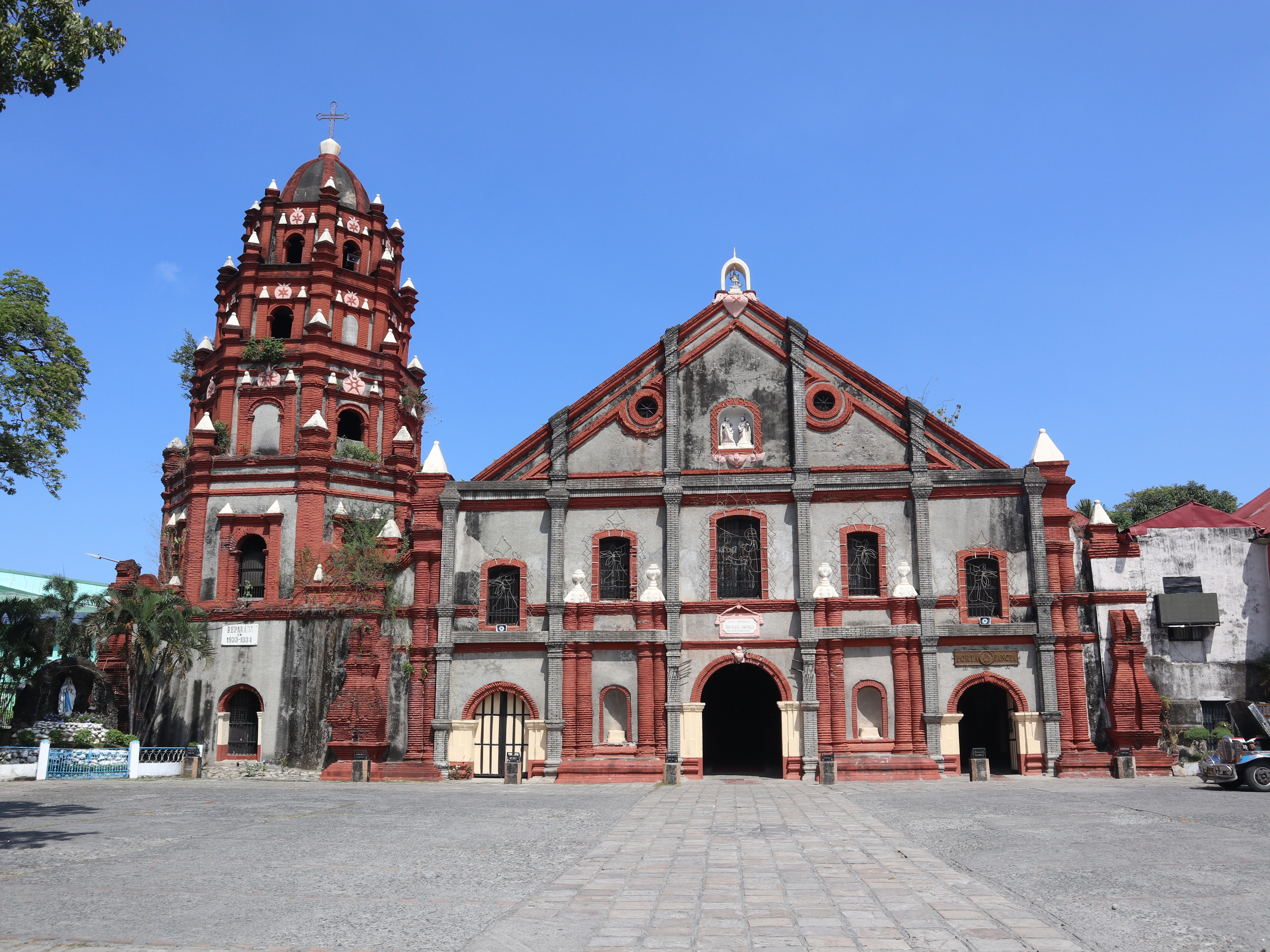
- Church facade in 2023

- Location in Luzon Location in the Philippines
- 16°02′10″N 120°12′45″E
- Location: Poblacion, Calasiao, Pangasinan
- Country: Philippines
- Denomination: Roman Catholic

History
- Status: Parish church
- Founded: 1588

Architecture
- Functional status: Active
- Heritage designation: National Cultural Treasure
- Designated: September 29, 2001
- Architectural type: Church building
- Style: Baroque

Specifications
- Length: 88.3 m (290 ft)
- Width: 25 m (82 ft)
- Height: 27.3 m (90 ft)
- Materials: Cement, massive bricks, steel, gravel

Administration
- Archdiocese: Lingayen-Dagupan

Clergy
- Archbishop: Socrates B. Villegas

Saints Peter and Paul Parish Church, commonly known as Calasiao Church, is a Baroque church located in Poblacion West, Calasiao, Pangasinan, Philippines. It belongs to the Vicariate of Sts. Peter and Paul under the Ecclesiastical Province of the Roman Catholic Archdiocese of Lingayen-Dagupan. The 57,840 Catholics is under the pastoral care of Rev. Fidelis B. Layog, assisted by Rev. Isidro Palinar, Jr. and Rev. Raymund Manaois.

The Spanish-colonial-era Church was declared a National Cultural Treasure by the National Museum of the Philippines and the National Commission for Culture and the Arts.

== History ==
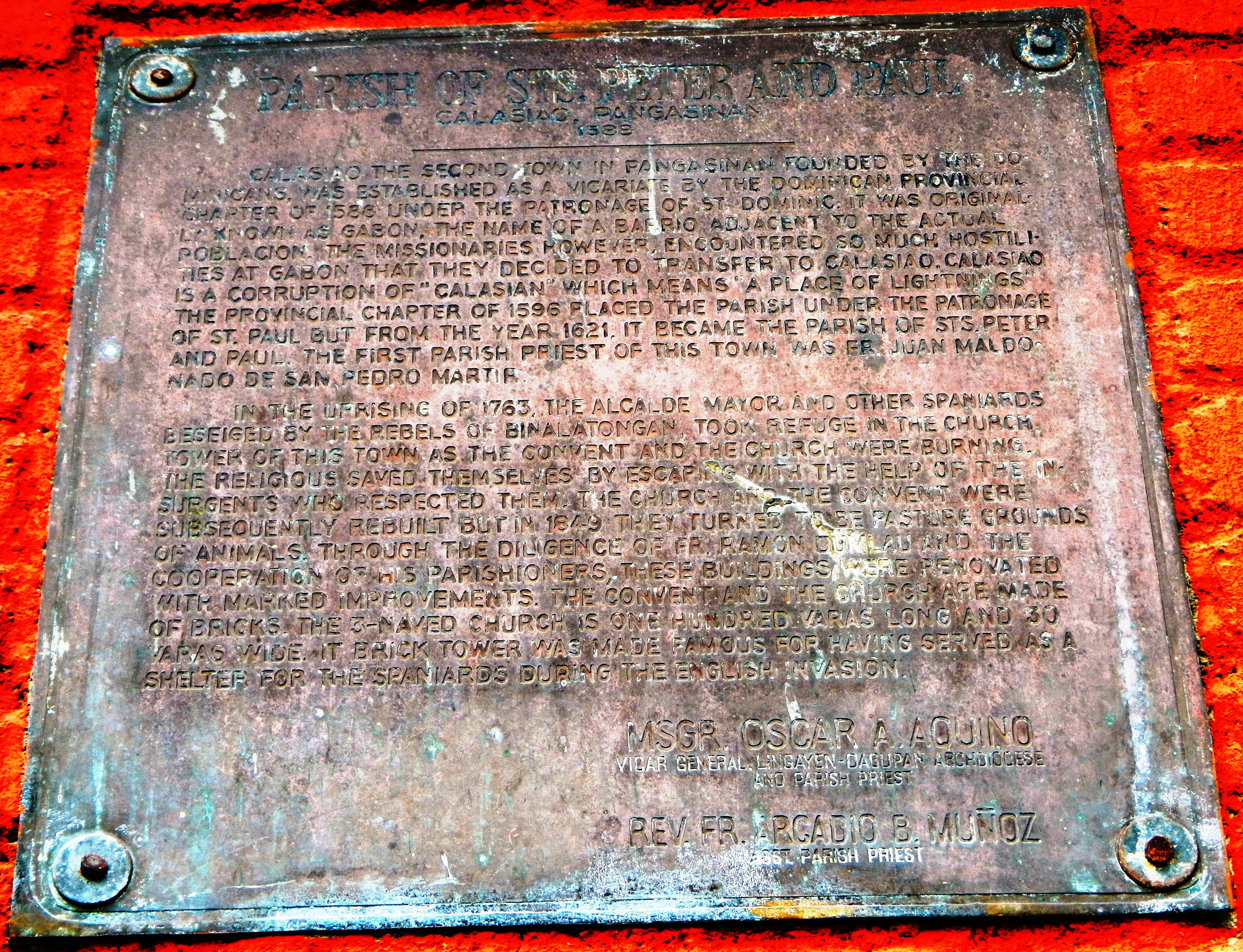
Church historical plaque

Built in several stages from the 17th to 19th centuries by the Dominicans, the best-preserved Pangasinan church bell tower and some parts have been reconstructed because of earthquakes. The 17th Century Calasiao Dominican Provincial chapter church under St. Paul's patronage became Sts. Peter and Paul Parish under Fr. Juan Maldonado de San Pedro Martin as parish priest after 1621.

In 1763, Filipino rebel Palaris (Binalatongan or San Carlos) burned the church. In 1804. Bishop Miguel Garcia de Nueva Segovia presided over the 1773 Synod of Calasiao at the sprawling Convento (per Manila Provincial Council Acts of 1771 to implement Decrees). Archbishop Basilio Sancho de Santa Justa y Rufina convened the Council from May to November 1771.

Calasiao had a new church of three naves (89 varas or yards long, 22 wide and 18 high with 2 rows of windows) with a bell tower. But in 1841 to 1842, this church was destroyed and rebuilt by Father Dalman in 1852 and then burned and restored from 1853 to 1858 by Father Ramos Suarez. The March 16, 1892, earthquake damaged the church. Dominican Vicar Fr. Bonifacio Probanza left Calasiao in 1898.

The 1936 Christ the King saw a new church. In 1945, the Lingayen cathedral and the archbishop's palace was temporarily transferred to Calasiao amid the miraculous 3 Liberation bombs thrown into the church and convent but failed to explode.

The earthquake on July 16, 1990, destroyed the church's belfry. Msgr. Luis B. Ungson reconstructed the church's and restored the bricked front wall, antique statues and the ceiling's original floral motif.

At present, the church owns fully automatic bells or chimes which could be heard within a 7- or 8-kilometer radius.

== Description ==
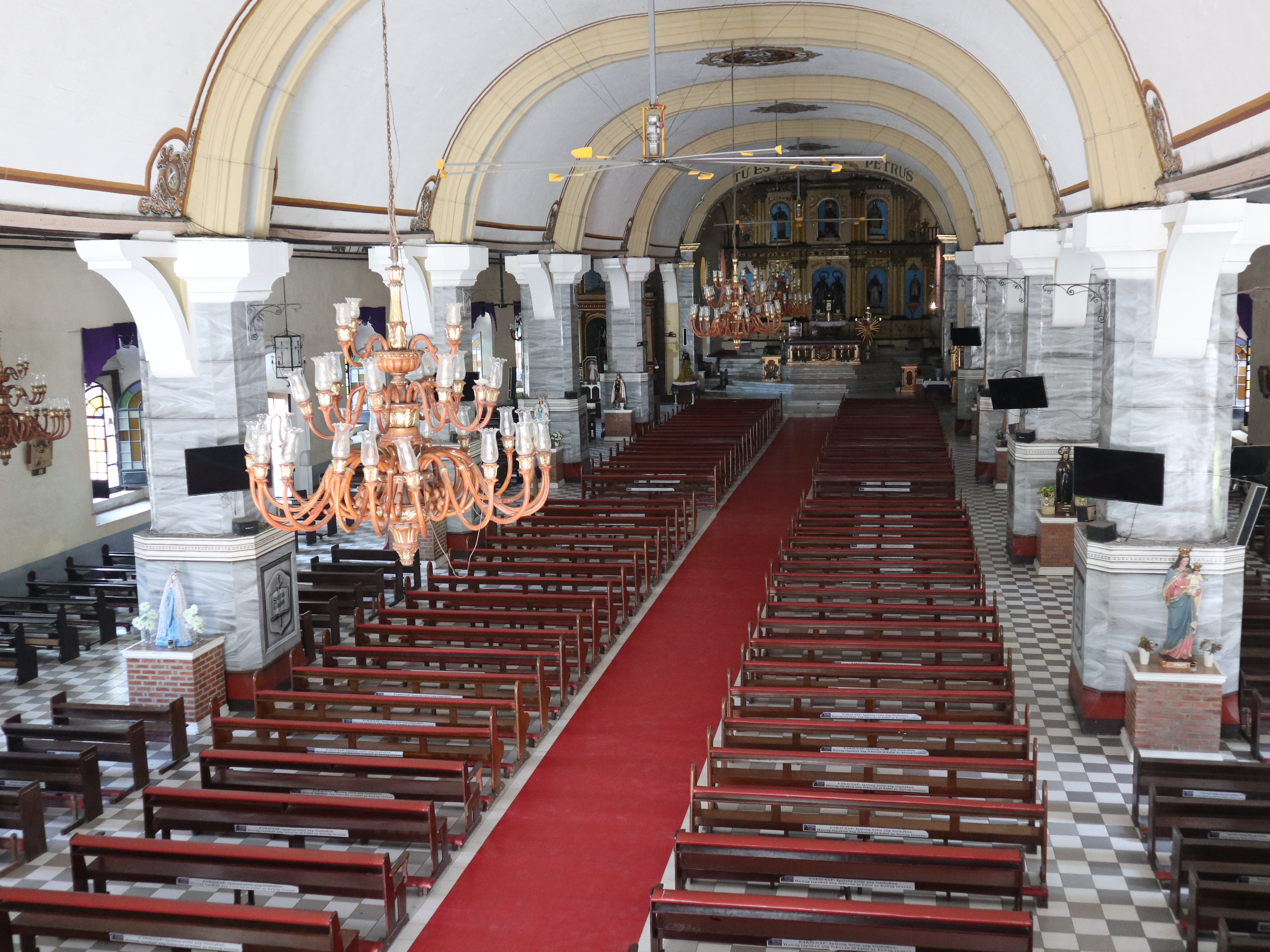
Church interior in 2023

The Latin American-style facade of bricks and cement of Calasiao Church, today, is 88.3 metres (290 ft), 25 metres (82 ft) wide and 27.3 metres (90 ft) high. The sprawling convent is 75 metres (246 ft) long, 25 metres (82 ft) wide and has 2 yards. Its 5-storey octagonal brick bell tower (replica of the earthquake destroyed original on July 16, 1990) with architectural designs that slightly resemble those of the Southeast Asian Hindu-Buddhist Pagodas is 30 metres (98 ft) high.

The original retablos (and a classic altar) is ornately decorated with statues of saints. The painted ceilings and the overall exterior are preserved for centuries. The intricate sculpture has tone of the Renaissance age's European Art as demonstrated by the church ceiling or dome, walls and the altar from the aisle near the main door.

The main door of the church features some heavy details: "Iglesia Parroquial San Pedro Y San Pablo Calasiao, Pangasinan". The church's large wooden floors on the second floor was the setting of Mga Kuwento ni Lola Basyang and the Sleeping beauty Episode. Outside, sculptures, could be found including the cave of the Nativity and the Sunico heritage bell on display and the Sacred Heart of Jesus.

Museo Calasiao, a mini museum stands on the right side of the church inside the sprawling convent which shows some vintage photos and history of the church. Its dome-kitchen structure separately engineered from the church and the convent is one of its odd and distinct features. Some parts of the church are currently being renovated as there are plans to promote it as a tourist attraction. Father Layog adds there are plans to put up a gallery so that visitors can appreciate the church’s historical value.

In front of the church and Convento are parking areas for vehicles tightly guarded by a solid iron entrance gate. Some meters therefrom is the famous "Senor Divino Tesoro Shrine" with the miraculous statue of a crucified Jesus Christ (believed to grow in size).

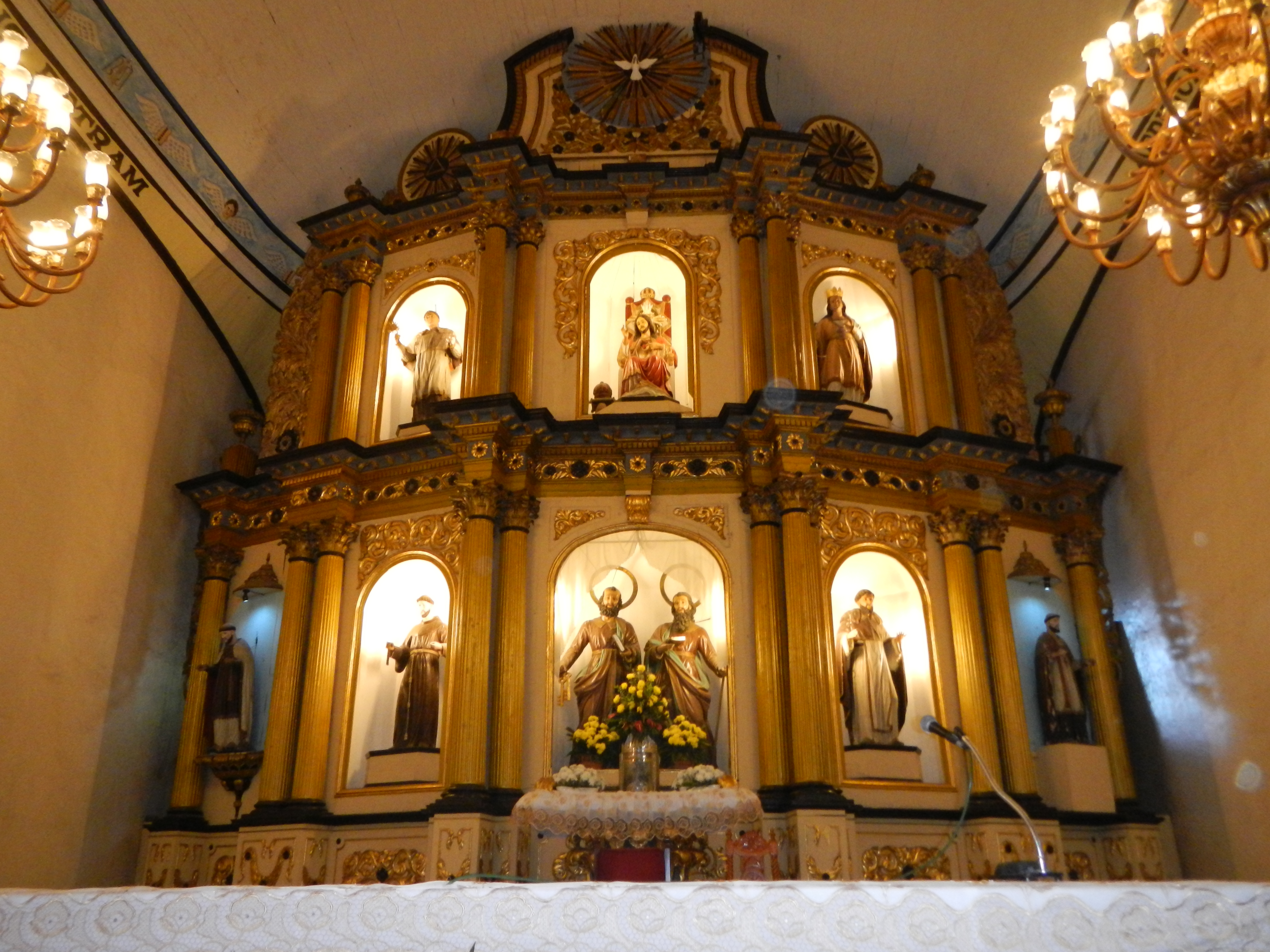
1588 Parish Church of Saints Peter and Paul (prized original retablos and classic altar ornately decorated with statues of saints)

=== Baroque church ===
As one of the Baroque churches in the Philippines, the Parish Church of Saints Peter and Paul has been at the forefront of Philippine history-Spanish colonial rule. Its unique architectural design reflects the Spanish and Latin American architecture integration of indigenous Philippines works of art with Chinese style fusion. Its massive bricks or ladrillo had been designed to withstand revolts and rebellions, due to its fortresses facade.

Its retablo mayor is massive and complex woodwork is seen at the back.

Calasiao Church has imposing buttresses and foundations seen in Earthquake Baroque architecture but failed upon earthquakes' annihilations.

== Declaration as a National Cultural Treasure ==
In 2001, Calasiao Church was declared as declared a National Cultural Treasure by the National Museum of the Philippines and the National Commission for Culture and the Arts under R.A. 4896 (as amended by P.D. 374 and R.A. 8492), on September 29, 2001. It is the 5th church to be declared as National Cultural Treasure. The Calasiao church (second in Pangasinan, following San Carlos') was adjudged as possessing "outstanding historical, cultural, artistic and/or scientific value and are representative of the original church-building orders of Augustinians, Franciscans, Jesuits, Dominicans, and Augustinian Recollects, and all the major regions of the country.

== Gallery ==
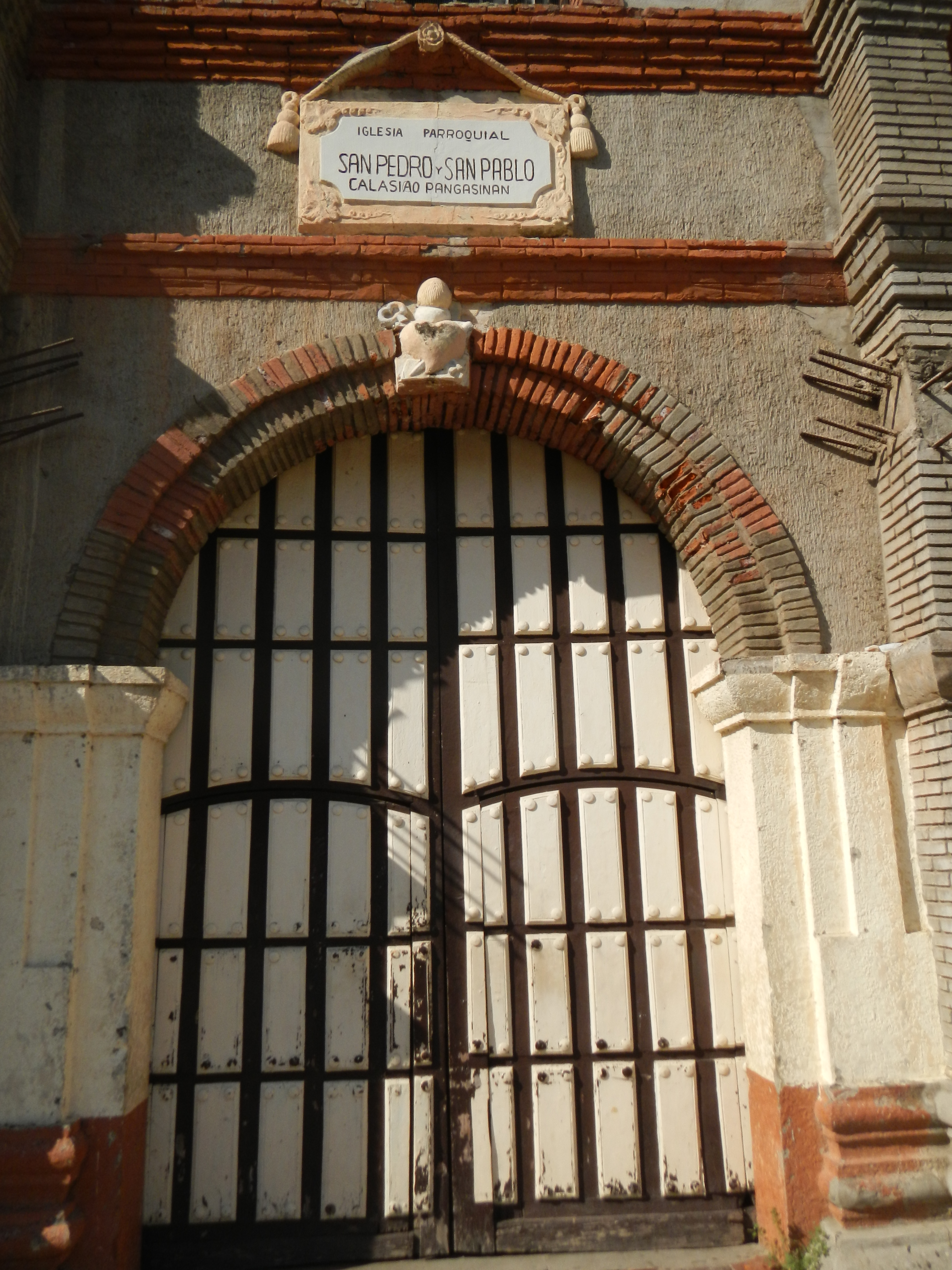
Main door

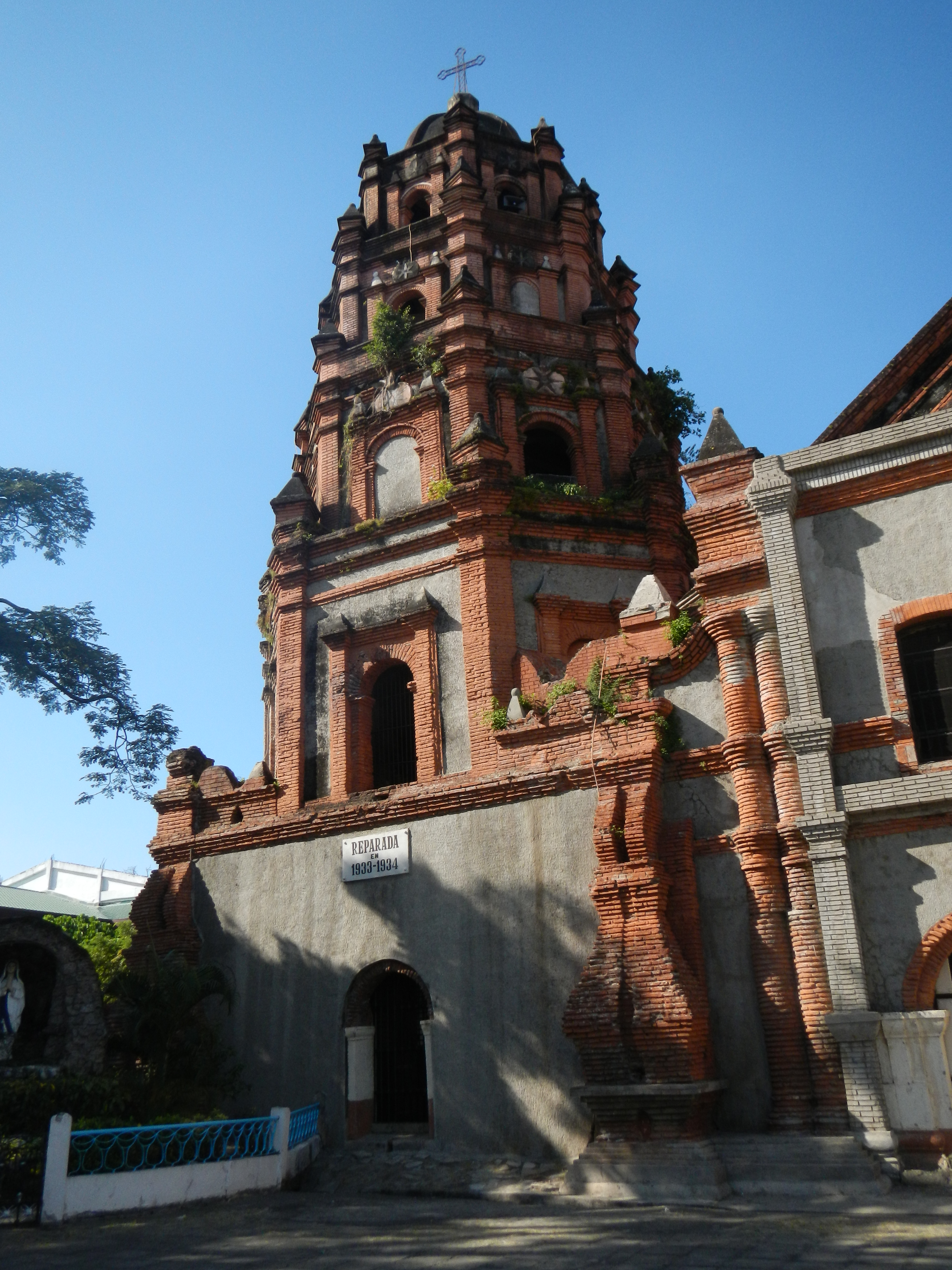
Bell tower

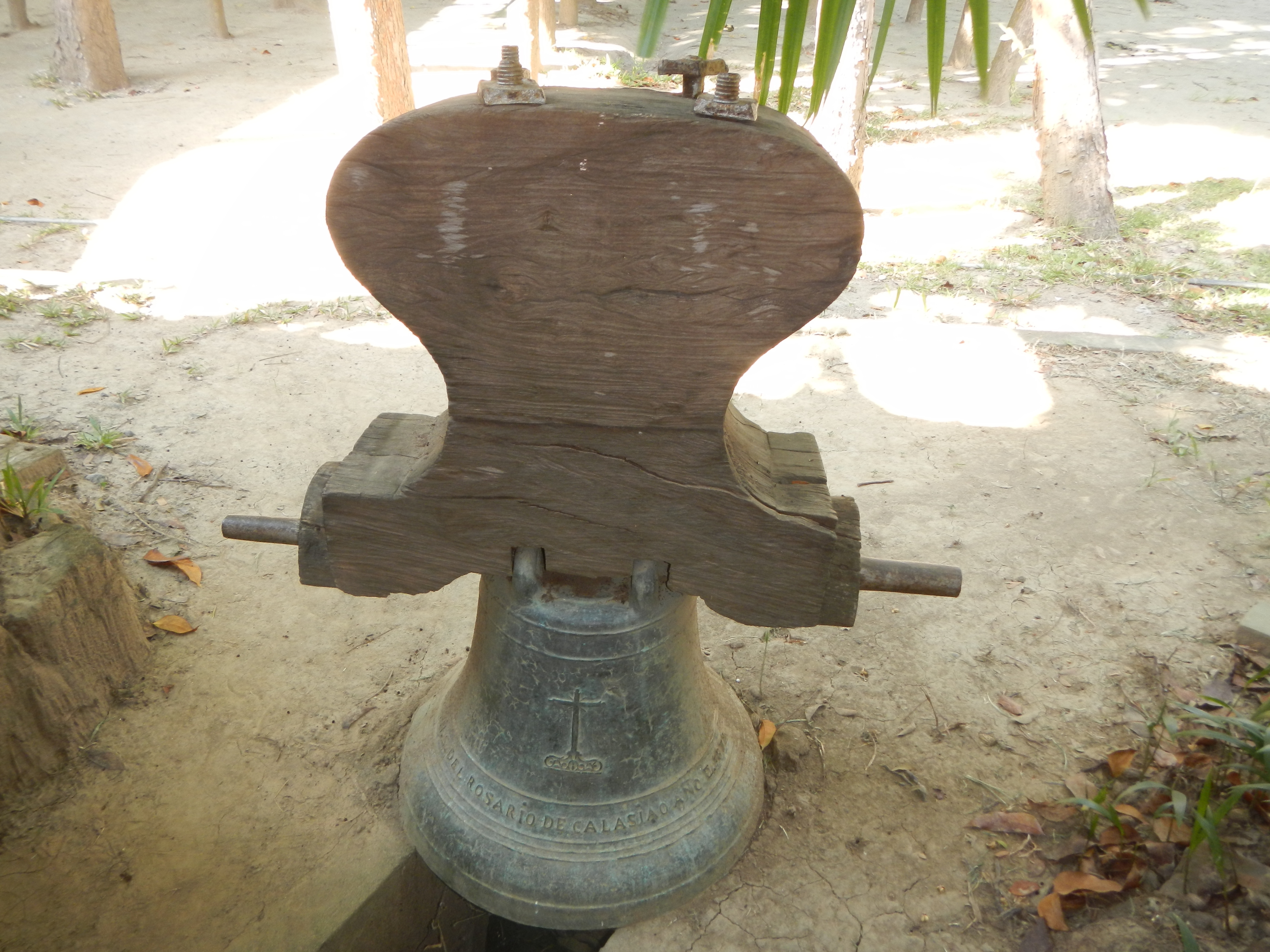
Sunico bell

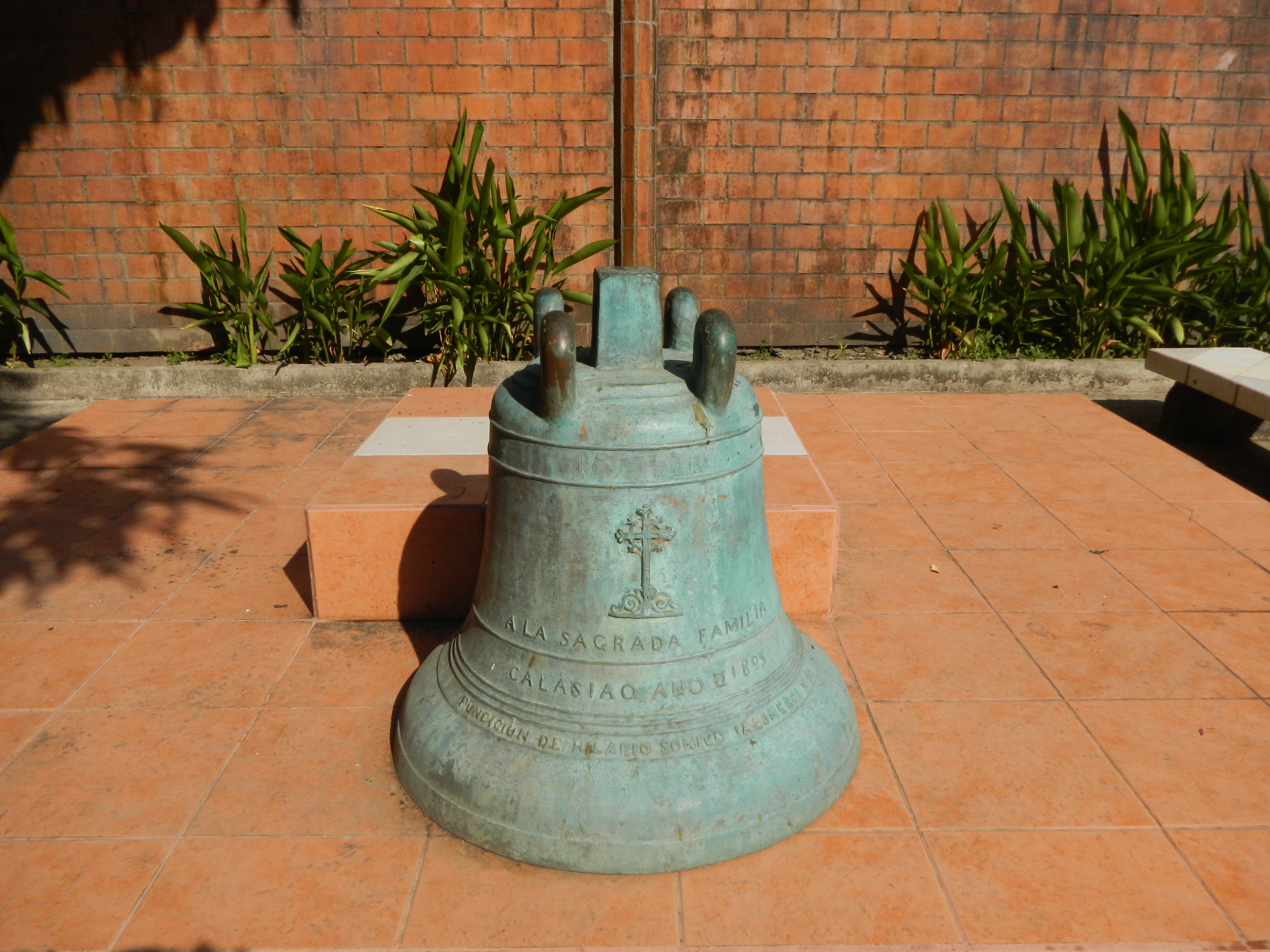
1895 Heritage Bell "A la Sagrada Familia" Fundacion de Hilario Chanuangco - Sunico y Santos

== Bibliography ==
- Benjamin Locsin Layug, "A Tourist Guide to Notable Philippine Churches." (Pasig, Philippines: New Day Publishers, 2007), p. 83.
- The 2010–2011 Catholic Directory of the Philippines (published by Claretian Publications for the Catholic Bishops' Conference of the Philippines, June 2010)
- Blair, Emma Helen, d. 1911, ed. The Philippine Islands. (1493-1898)
- Coseteng, Alice M. L. “The Good Wood”. Filipino Heritage: The Making of a Nation. Vol. 4. Ed by Alfredo Roces. Quezon City. Lahing Filipino Publication. 1977-78.
- ”Marxist Sociological Perspective”. Art History’s History. Vernon Hyde Minor. Phaidon Press.1989.
