= Tanay Church =

Roman Catholic church in Rizal, Philippines

- San Ildefonso de Toledo Parish Church
- Parokya ni San Ildefonso ng Toledo (Tagalog); Iglesia Parroquial de San Ildefonso de Toledo (Spanish)
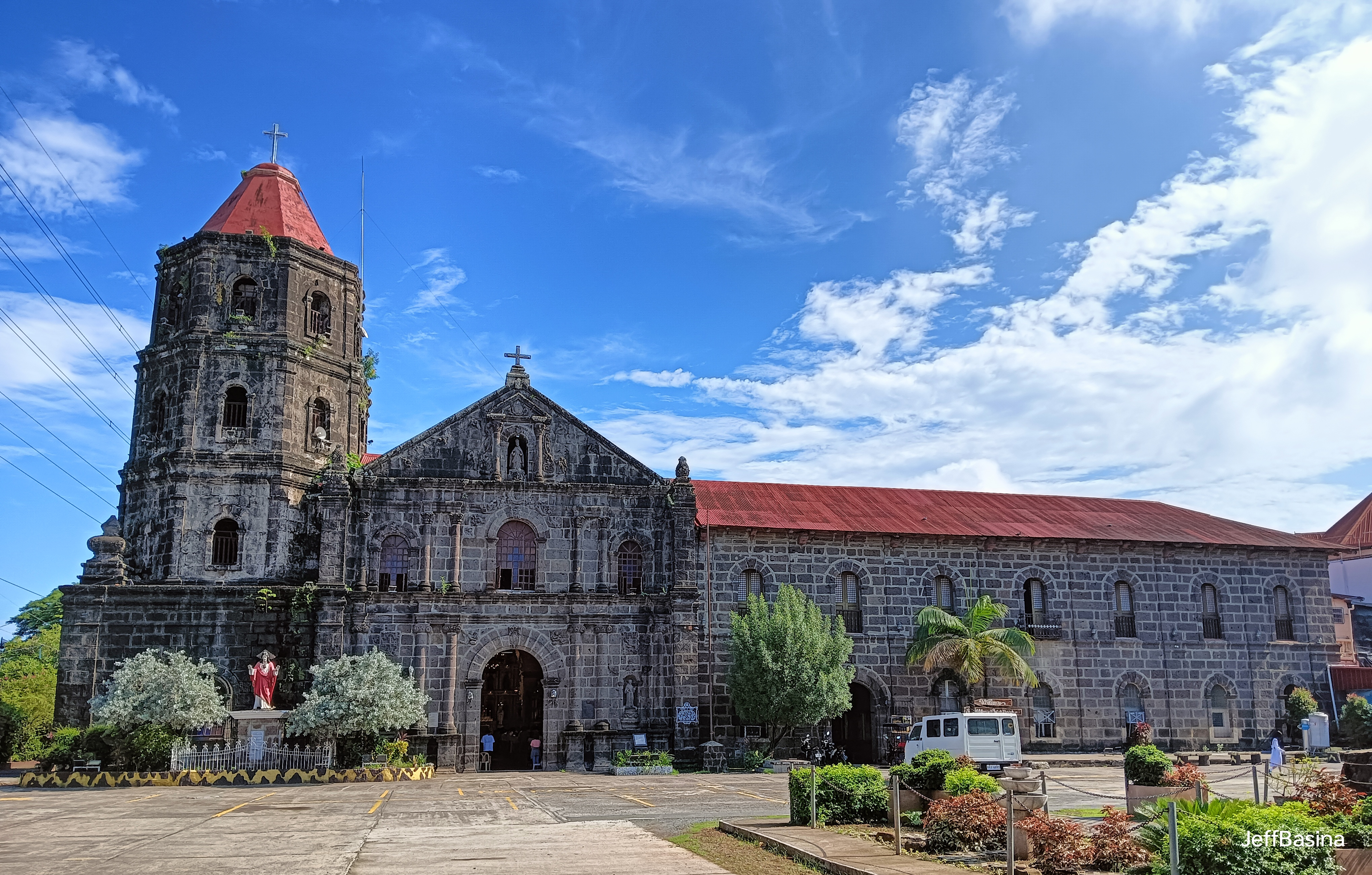
- Church façade in 2024

- Location in Luzon Location in the Philippines
- 14°31′23″N 121°16′02″E
- Location: Tanay, Rizal
- Country: Philippines
- Denomination: Roman Catholic
- Website: sidtp-tanay.com/index.html

History
- Status: Parish church
- Dedication: Ildephonsus of Toledo

Architecture
- Functional status: Active
- Heritage designation: National Cultural Treasure
- Designated: July 31, 2001
- Architectural type: Church building
- Groundbreaking: 1773
- Completed: 1783

Administration
- Archdiocese: Manila
- Diocese: Antipolo

Clergy
- Archbishop: Jose Fuerte Advincula Jr.
- Bishop: Ruperto Cruz Santos
- Priest: Ferdinand C. Delatado

San Ildefonso de Toledo Parish Church, commonly known as Tanay Church, is a Roman Catholic church located in the town of Tanay, Rizal in the Philippines. It is under the jurisdiction of the Diocese of Antipolo. The construction of the present church began in 1773 and was completed ten years later, in 1783. In 2001, it was declared as a National Cultural Treasure by the National Commission for Culture and the Arts. It is also one of the seven Jubilee Churches of the Diocese of Antipolo.

== History ==
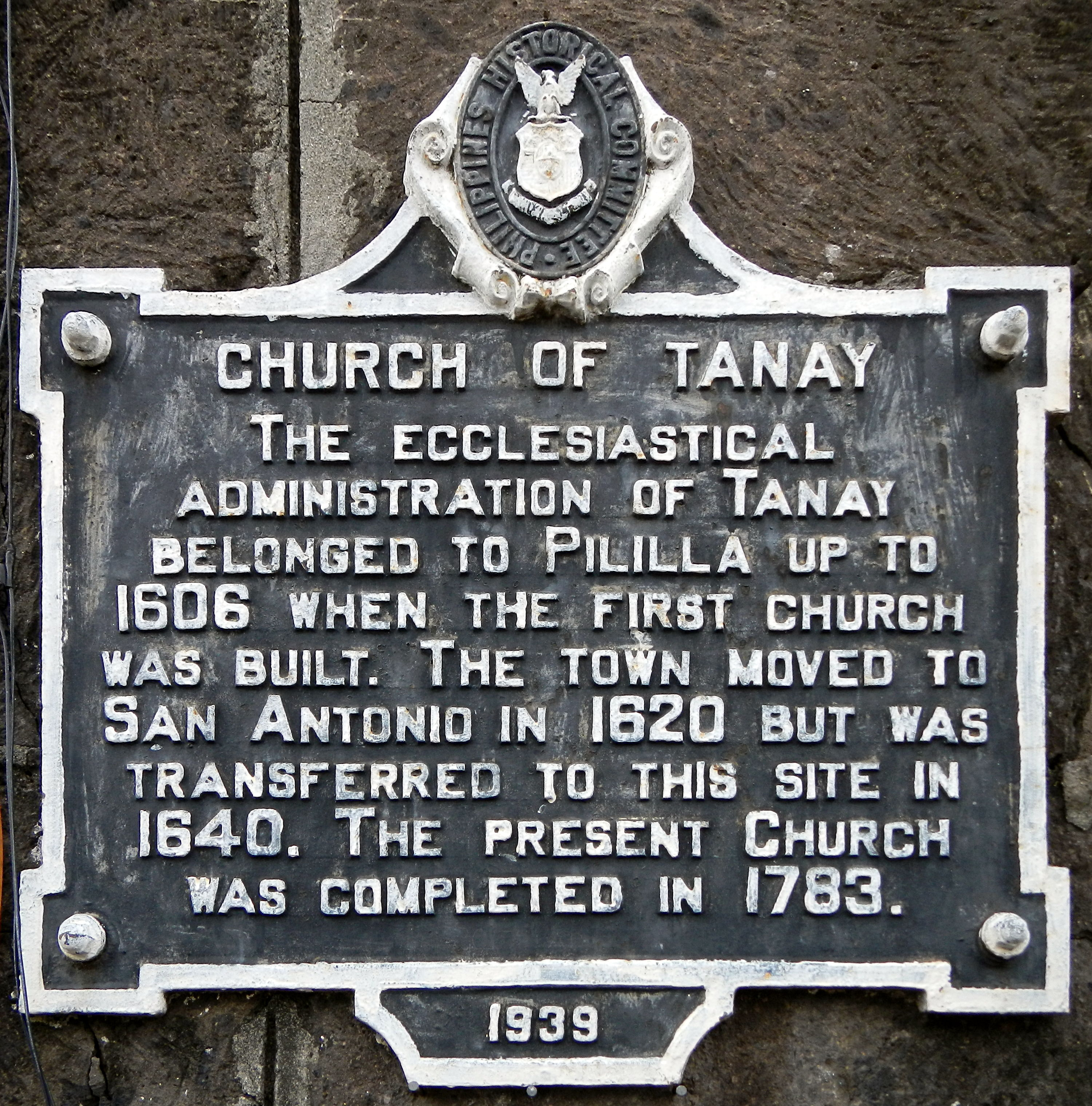
Church PHC historical marker installed in 1939

The ecclesiastical history of Rizal province dates back to 1573 when two Franciscan missionaries, Juan de Plasencia and Diego de Oropesa began establishing missions in towns and villages along the north coast of Laguna de Bay. One of earliest established is a visita (sub-parish) is Pililla in Morong, Rizal, among them is Monte de Tan-ay (now part of the present town of Tanay). In 1583, Pililla separated from Morong and became an independent town and in turn, Monte de Tan-ay evolved into a separate town and parish in 1606. The parish church of Monte de Tan-ay was put under the patronage of Saint Ildephonsus of Toledo, Spain, hence, given the same name. In 1606, Pedro de Talavera founded the second mission in San Antonio in Pantay and subsequently became the first parish priest of Monte de Tan-ay.

By 1620, the town transferred to San Antonio without changing its patron saint. The first church made up of wood and cogon grass as its roof was also established in San Antonio but was eventually burned down by the flaming arrows of marauding Aetas. Church records state that only a very old image of La Purísima Concepción was saved from the attack, believed to have been left in haste by the retreating Spanish forces.

In 1640, a wide-scale Chinese uprising took over the villages across Laguna from Manila to Bulacan. Chinese rebels descended to Tanay and established camps in Monte de Tan-ay and Pantay. A popular story recounts how a Franciscan priest, Geronimo de Frías, hid the image of La Purísima inside the jungle nearby. It was said that three Chinese soldiers unwittingly discovered the image and tried to destroy it with their spears; the spears were miraculously thrown back to the throwers. Driven by fear, the remaining Chinese who witnessed the event committed suicide by hanging himself in the tree in a place now known as Pinagbigtihan (Place of Hanging).

The town suffered a heavy blow during the uprising which only ended when a combined Filipino-Spanish forces attacked their camps on 1640. After the rebels were oppressed, the priests transferred the parish to its present site, formally establishing the town of Tanay in the same year.

When the town celebrated its first fiesta on its new site in 1641, the event was commemorated by celebrating the day following the feast of San Ildefonso as a special day of devotion in honor of the Blessed Virgin — a custom still maintained. It would appear that the said image of La Purísima later became the object of a somewhat fanatical devotion by some of the less well instructed of the faithful, so it was later replaced by the present image of Our Lady of Guadalupe under which title Our Lady is still venerated in Tanay every January 24.

In 1678, Pedro de Espallargas initiated the building of a stone church and the first church was completed in 1680 through the contributions of churchgoers and devotees of Purísima Concepción. The first Mass was celebrated on April 20, 1680. However, the structure did not last long because of natural calamities. By 1773, the construction of the present church began through the initiative of Alonzo de Fentanes and the people of Tanay; it was gradually completed in 1783. The six retablos in honor of Our Lady of Anguish (Nuestra Señora de las Angustias), the Immaculate Conception (La Purísima Concepción), Saint Joseph, Saint Peter of Alcantara, the Baptism of Jesus Christ and Saint Ildefonsus of Toledo were installed in 1786.

The church was declared as one of the five Jubilee churches of the Roman Catholic Diocese of Antipolo in 1999. In celebration of 500 Years of Christianity in the Philippines, the church also declared as one of the seven jubilee churches in 2021.

== National Cultural Treasure ==
On July 31, 2001, the church was declared a National Cultural Treasure by the National Commission for Culture and the Arts along with 25 other churches in the Philippines.

== Features ==
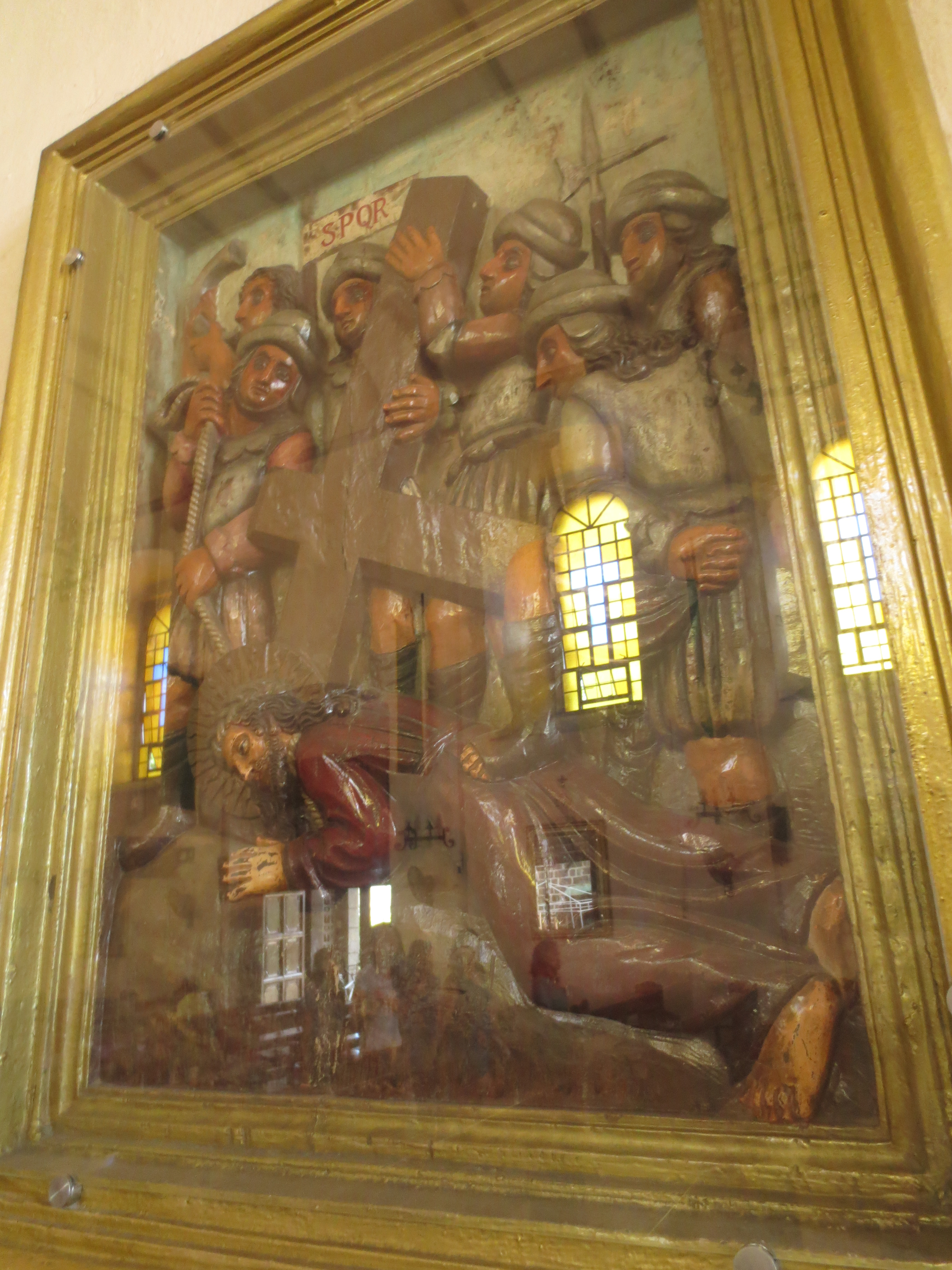
One of the Stations of the Cross inside the church

The style of the church, with its triangular pediment and rounded belfry, leans toward Baroque architecture. The church also houses a relic of a piece of bone of San Ildefonso housed in a monstrance, given by Felipe Pedraja in October 2006 from Zamora, Spain in which the body of the patron saint lies.

The 14 handcrafted Stations of the Cross images inside the church is considered one of the most beautiful bas relief installations in Asia. The carvings are depicted to have Malayan features as evidenced by the brown skin of the natives and their squat figures, all of which are believed to have been created by native Tanay artisans. Some distinct depictions are borrowed from the native culture such as the Tambuli (Buffalo horn) made of carabao, and the bolo instead of the typical Roman sword; as well as anachronistic juxtapositions such as a Pharisee wearing dark pince-nez glasses, cityscapes resembling a Spanish colonial city, and women dressed in their frugal 18th century attire. The carvings are encased in large glass windows across each sides of the church.

== Gallery ==
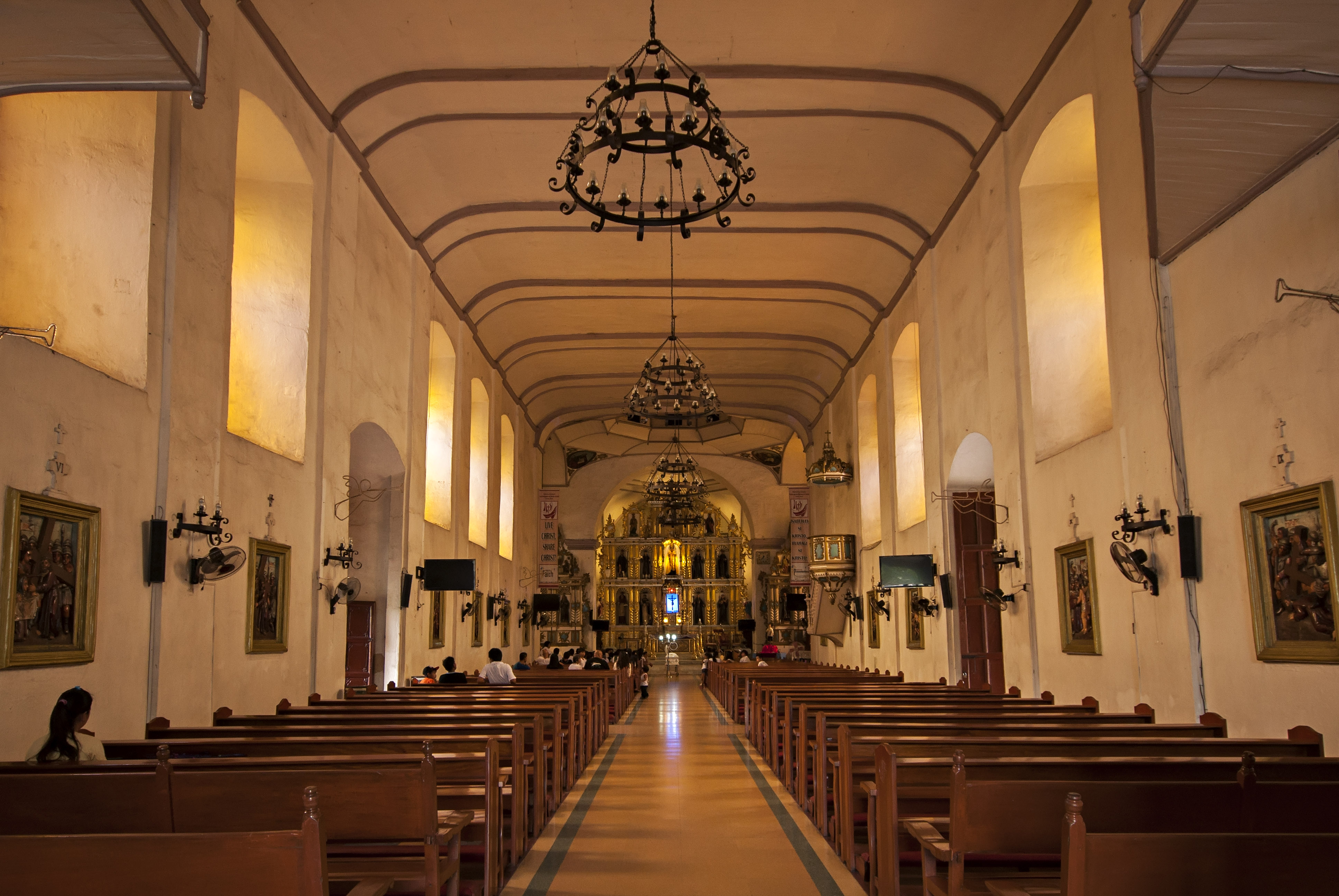
Church interior in 2013

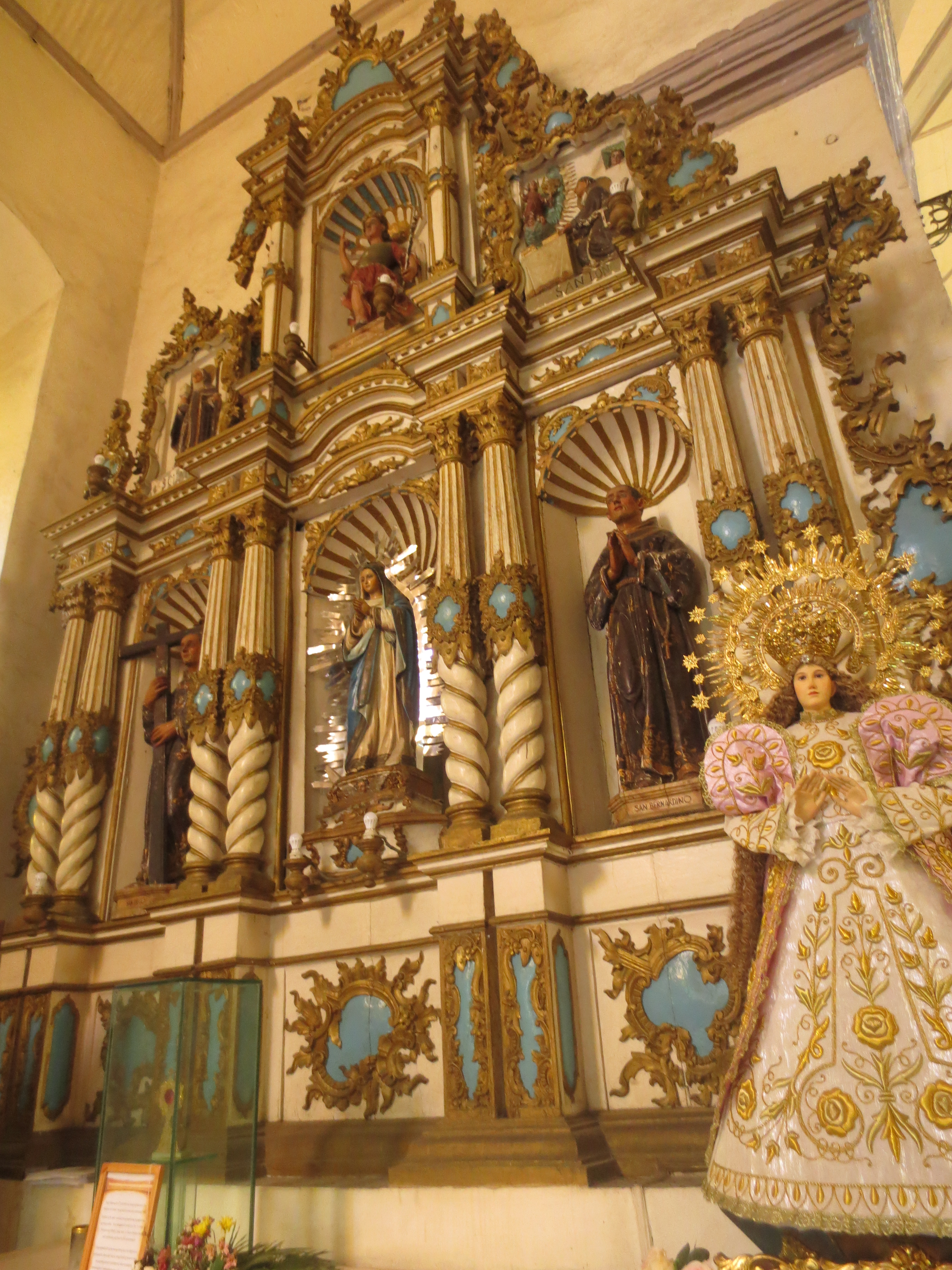
An old retablo menor

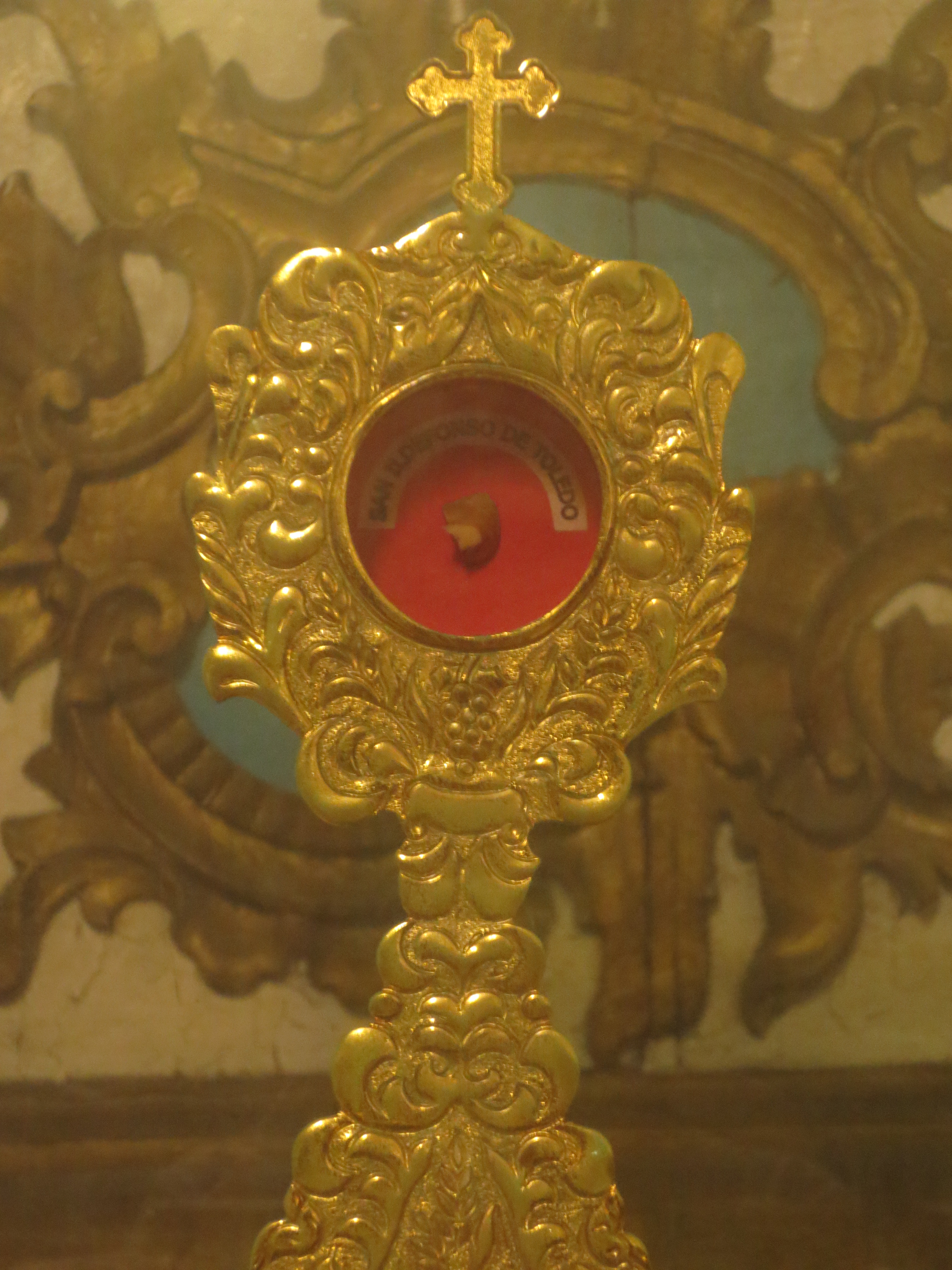
A bone relic of San Ildefonso

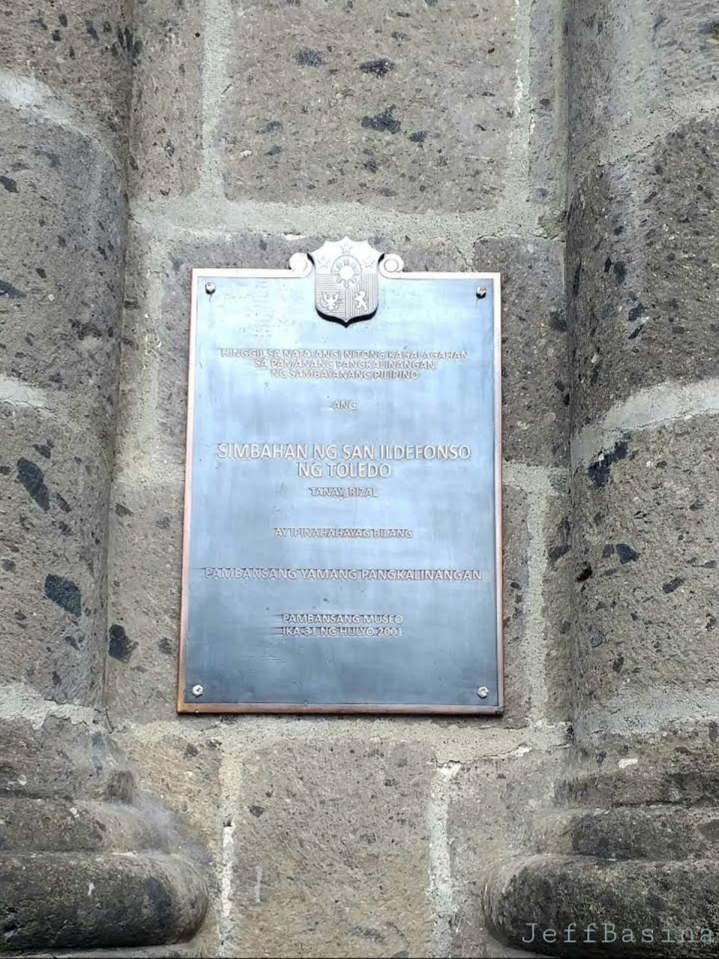
National Commission for Culture and the Arts marker

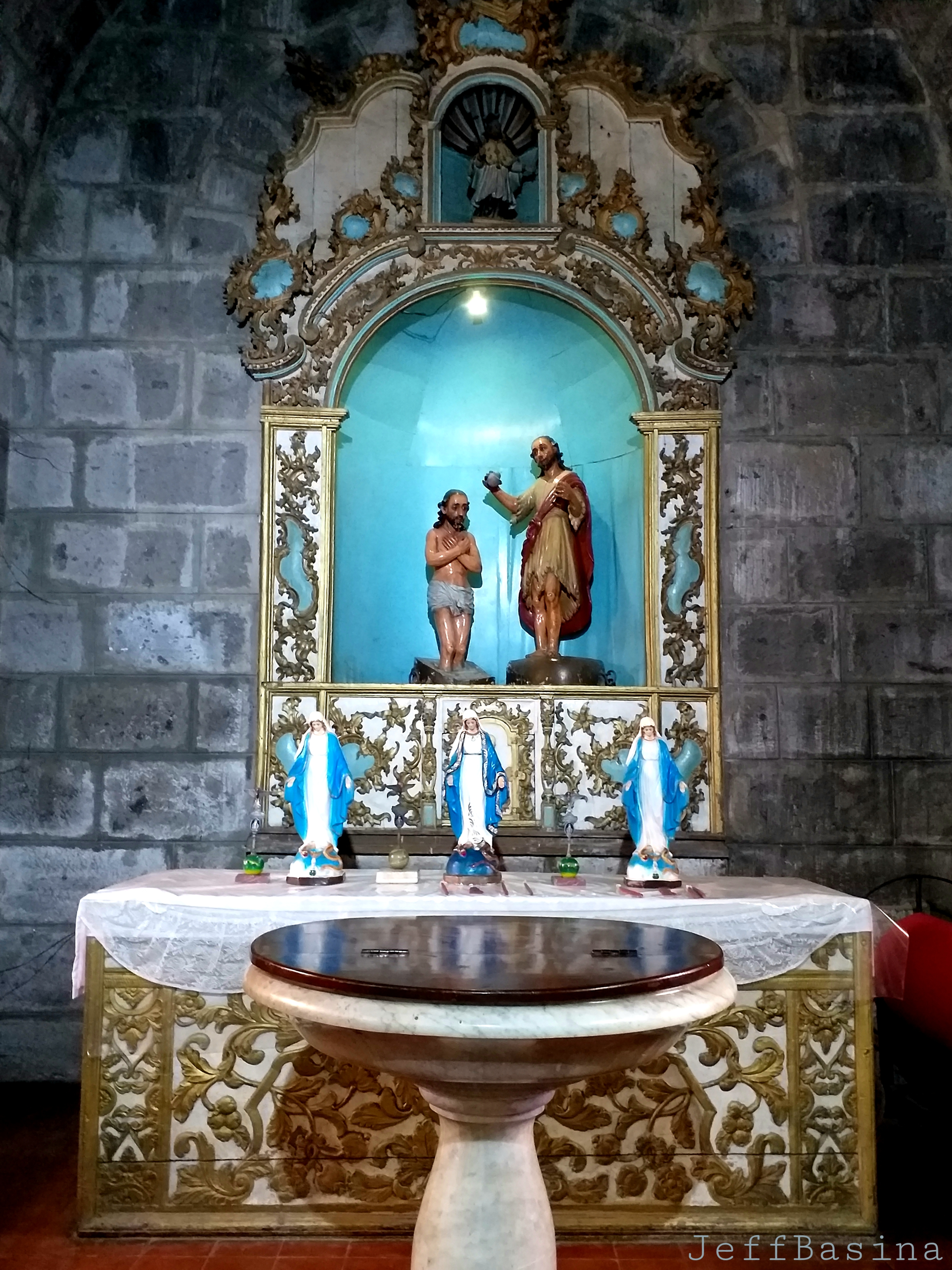
Church baptistry

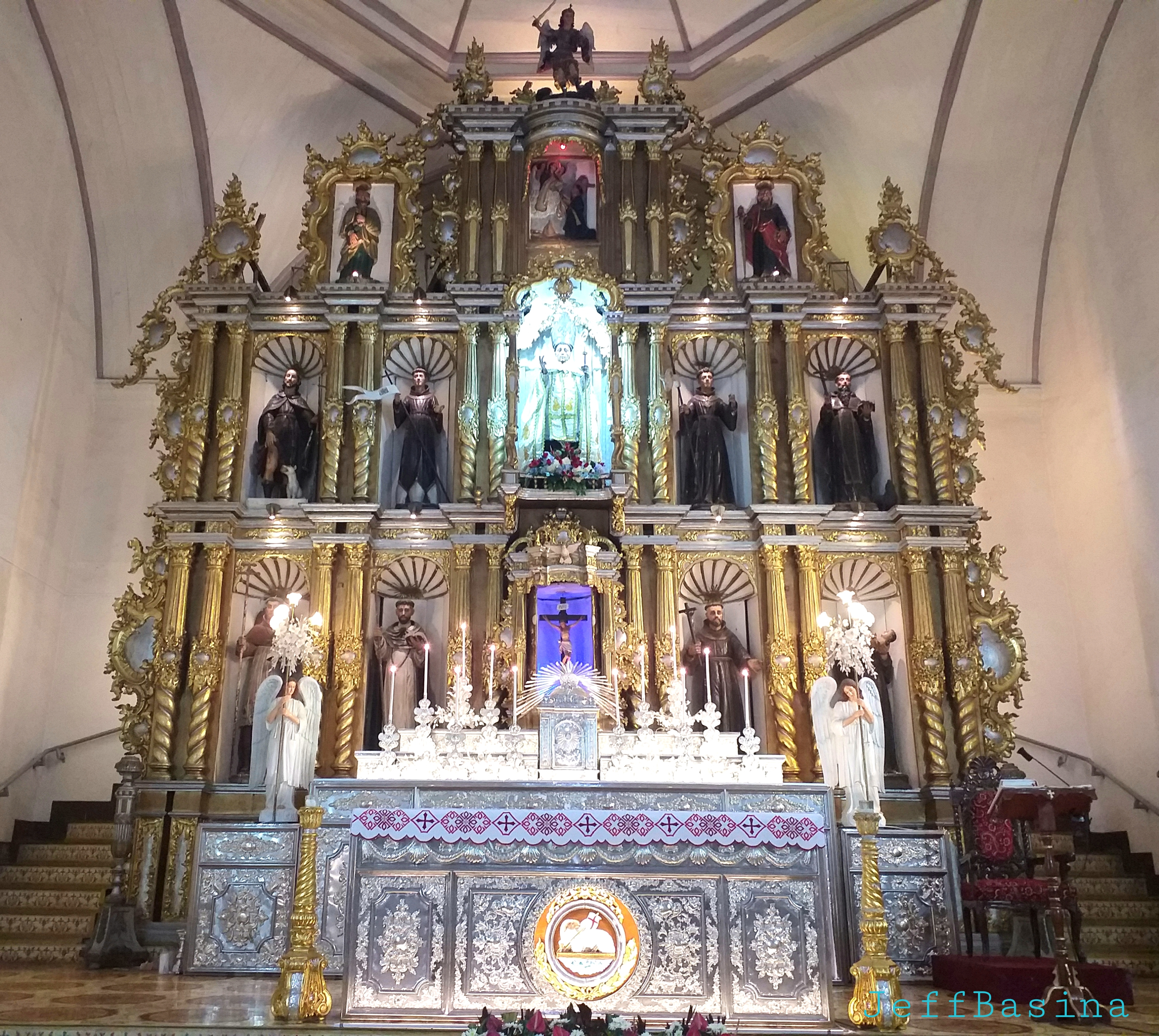
Church main altar and its newly restored altar silvers replicated from the lost one

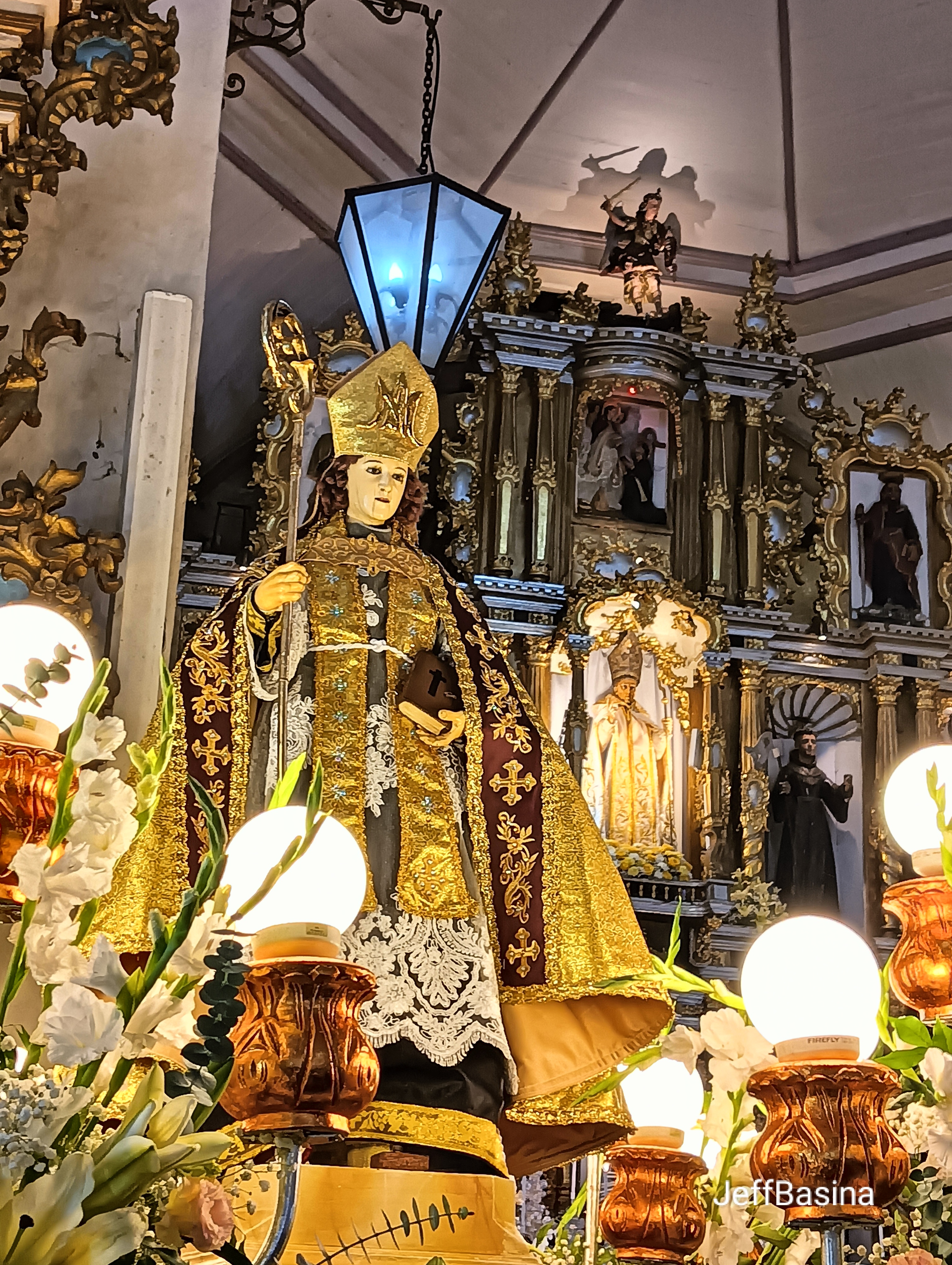
The processional and the altar image of San Ildefonso

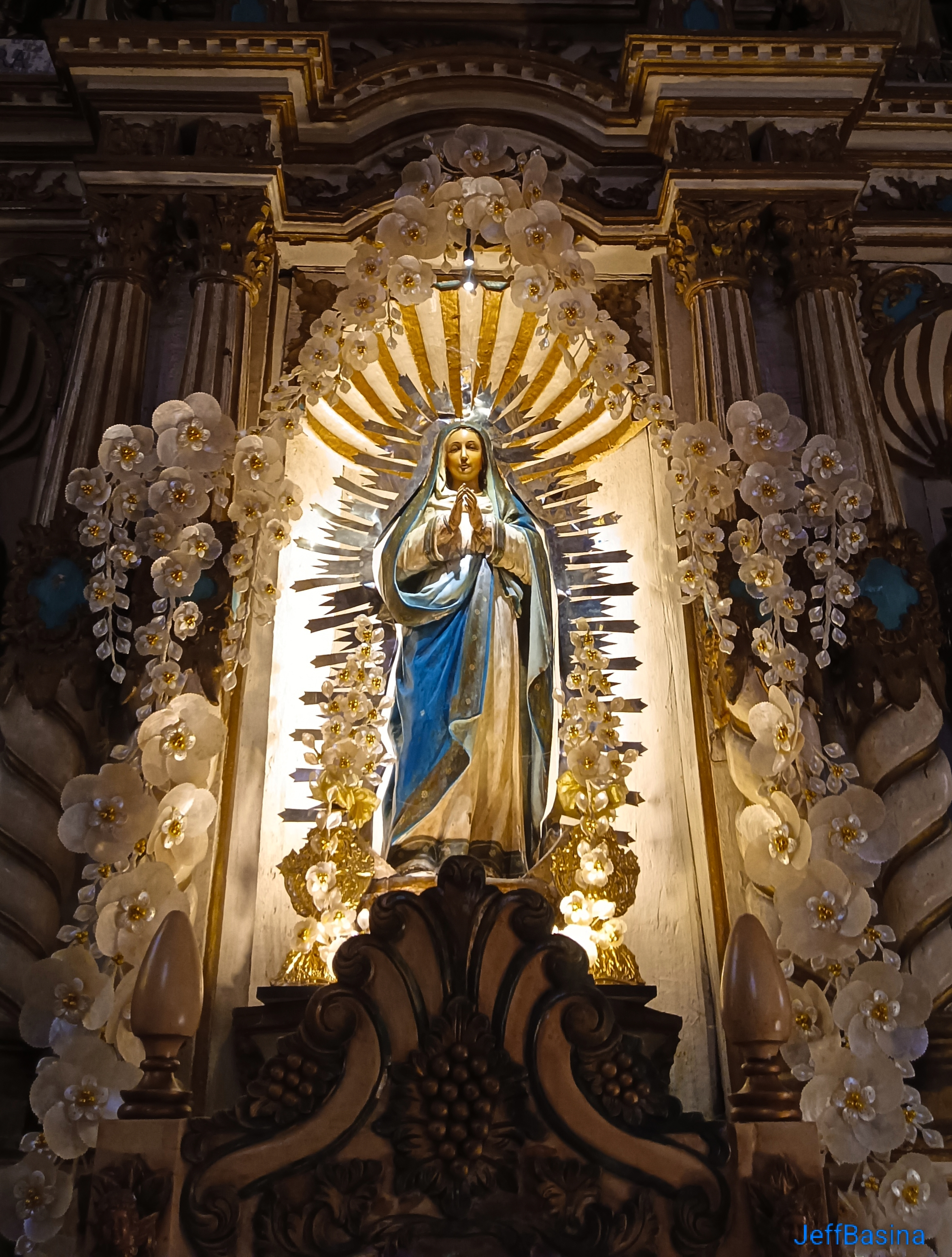
Virgen de Tanay
