= Earthquake Baroque =

Baroque architecture intended to resist earthquakes

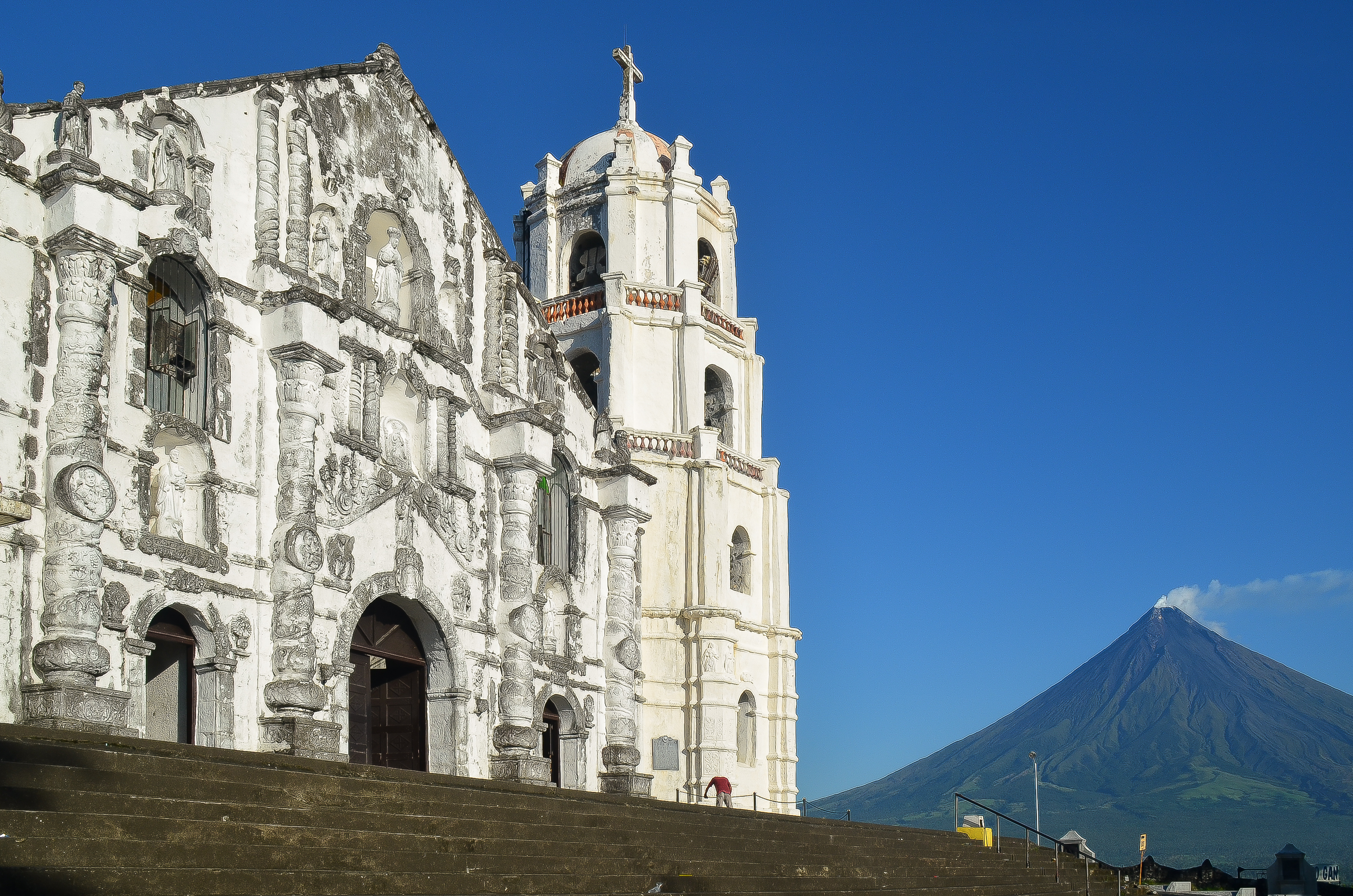
Daraga Church is an example of Earthquake Baroque architecture with thick buttresses supporting the walls

Earthquake Baroque, or Seismic Baroque, is a style of Baroque architecture found in the Philippines and in Guatemala, which were Spanish-ruled territories that suffered destructive earthquakes during the 17th and the 18th centuries. Large public buildings, such as churches, were then rebuilt in a Baroque style during the Spanish colonial periods in those countries.

Art historian Pál Kelemen originally coined the term "Earthquake Baroque" in his 1951 book "Baroque and Rococo in Latin America" which he used to describe the massively buttressed churches of Antigua Guatemala, and later architectural thinkers like Winand Klassen and René Javellana, then applied it to colonial Spanish architecture in the Philippines which withstood much more frequent earthquakes. Eventually, Earthquake Baroque was not limited to just the Philippines and Guatemala, but is also found in Colombia, Panama, Ecuador, and Peru, which also experienced earthquakes. Similar events led to the Pombaline architecture in Lisbon following the 1755 Lisbon earthquake and Sicilian Baroque in Sicily following the 1693 earthquake.

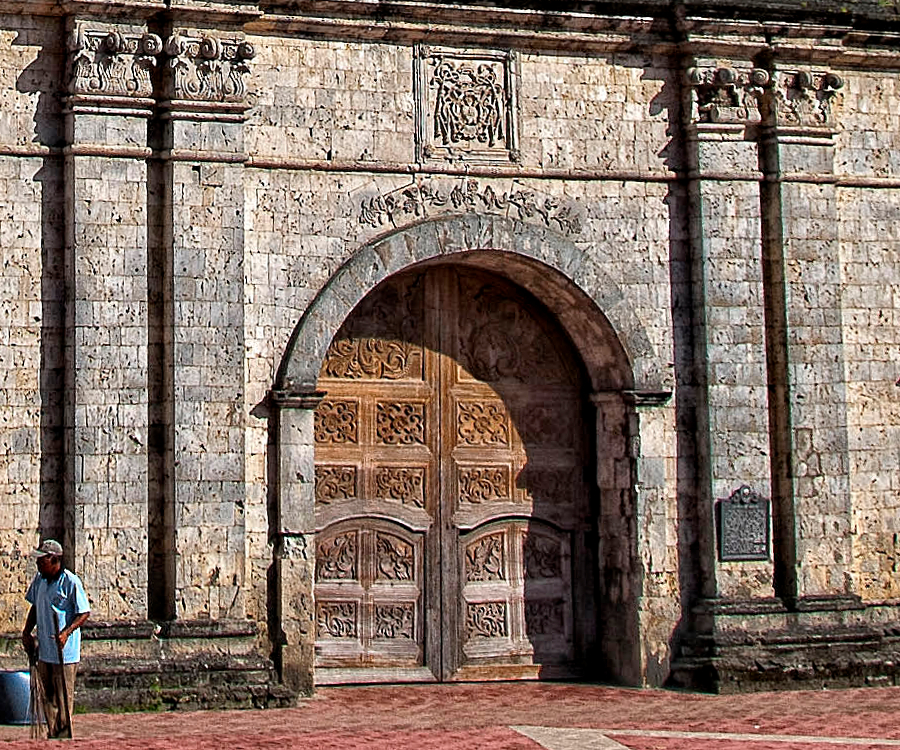
Top to Bottom: Panay church entrance with view of façade Pilasters, Paoay church buttresses.

== Characteristics ==
In the Spanish East Indies, the destruction of churches from frequent earthquakes made subsequent church designs to have lower and wider proportions. Side walls were made thicker and heavily buttressed for stability during tremors, while upper structures were made with lighter materials. In other cases, thinner walls were introduced by progressively decreasing their thickness to the topmost levels.

Bell towers are usually lower and stouter than those in less seismically active regions of the world. Towers are thicker in the lower levels, progressively narrowing to the topmost level. In some Philippine churches, aside from functioning as watchtowers against pirates, some bell towers are detached from the main church building to avoid damage in case these would collapse in an earthquake.

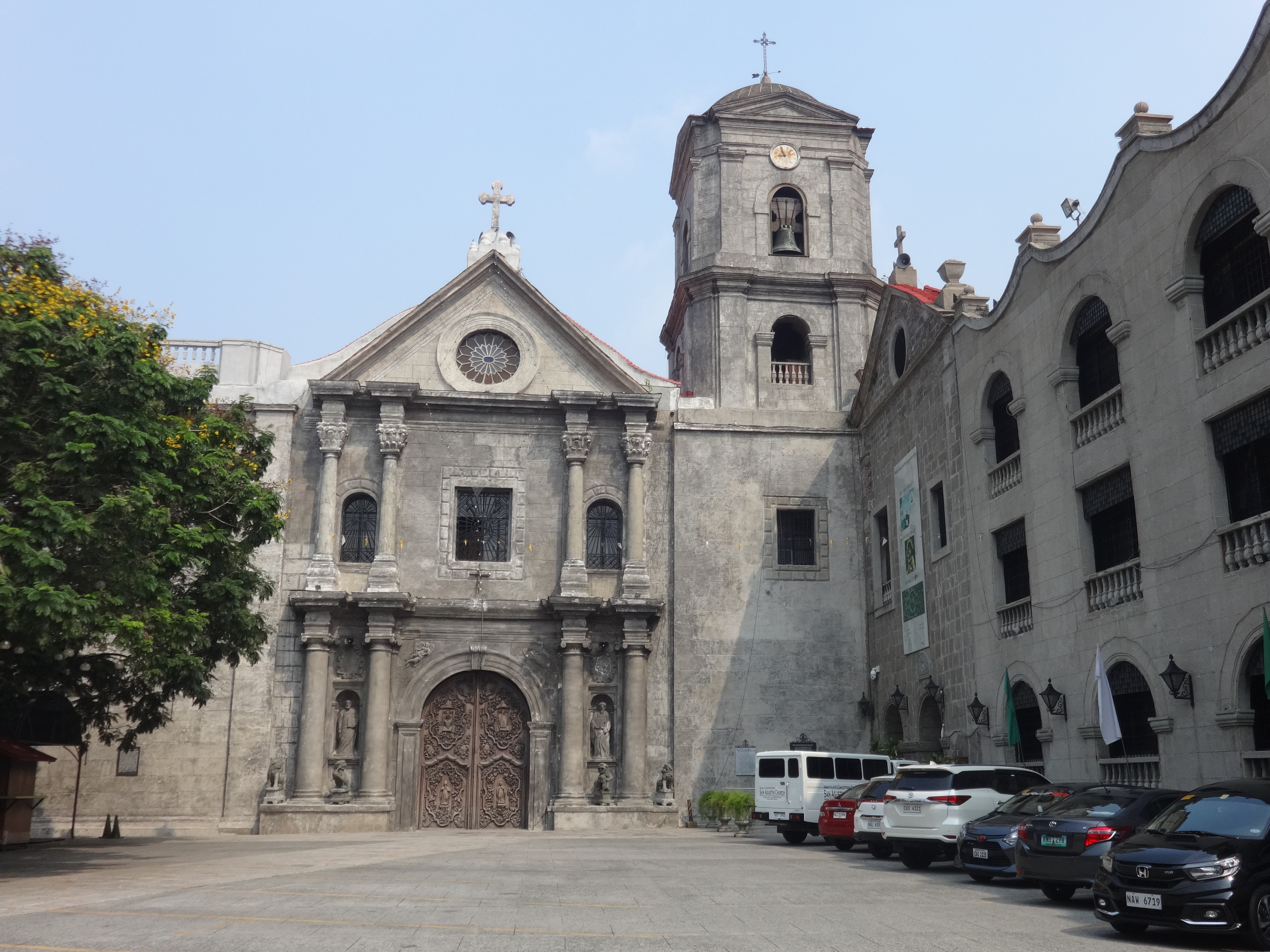
San Agustin Church (Manila)

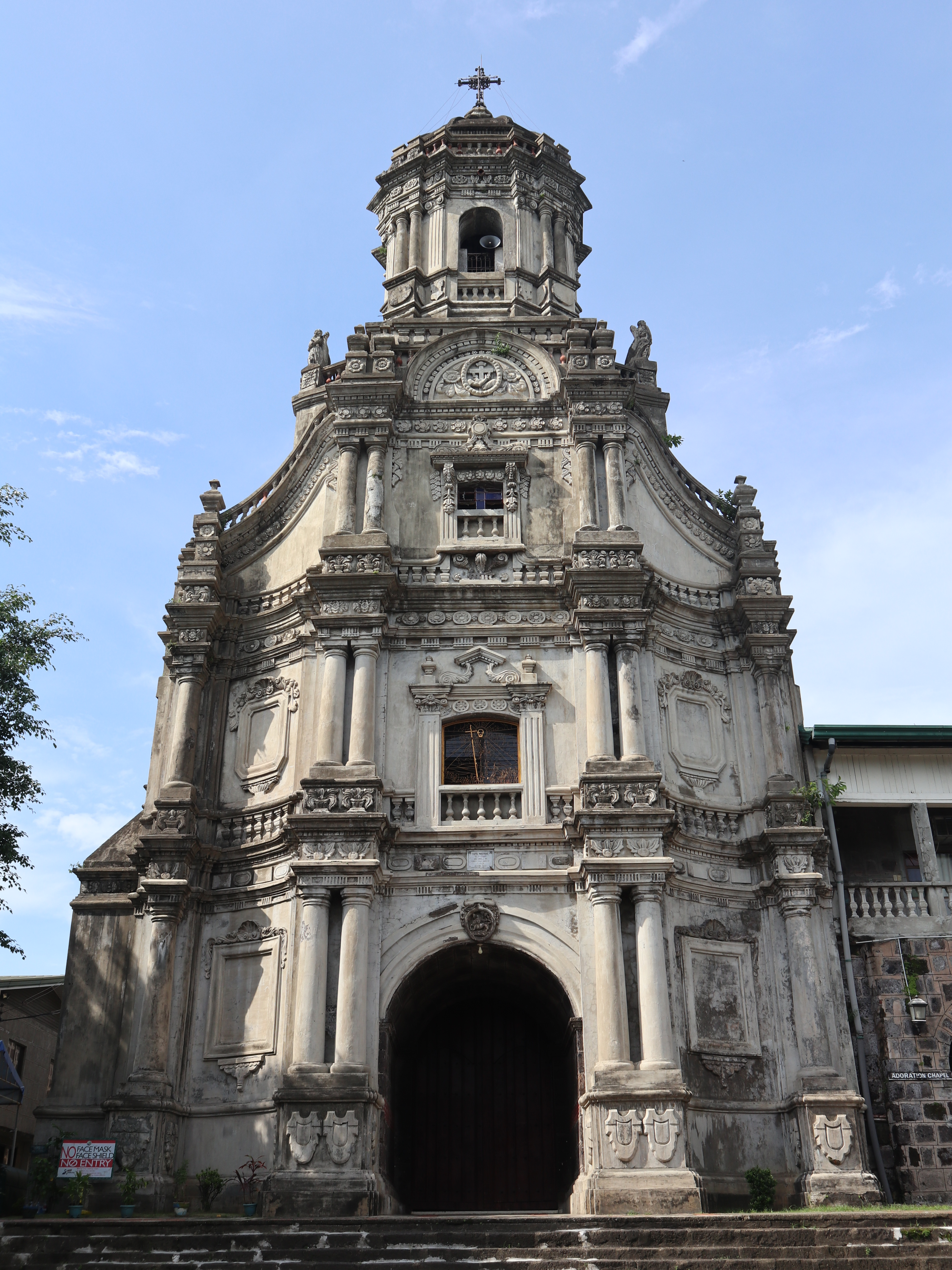
Morong Church

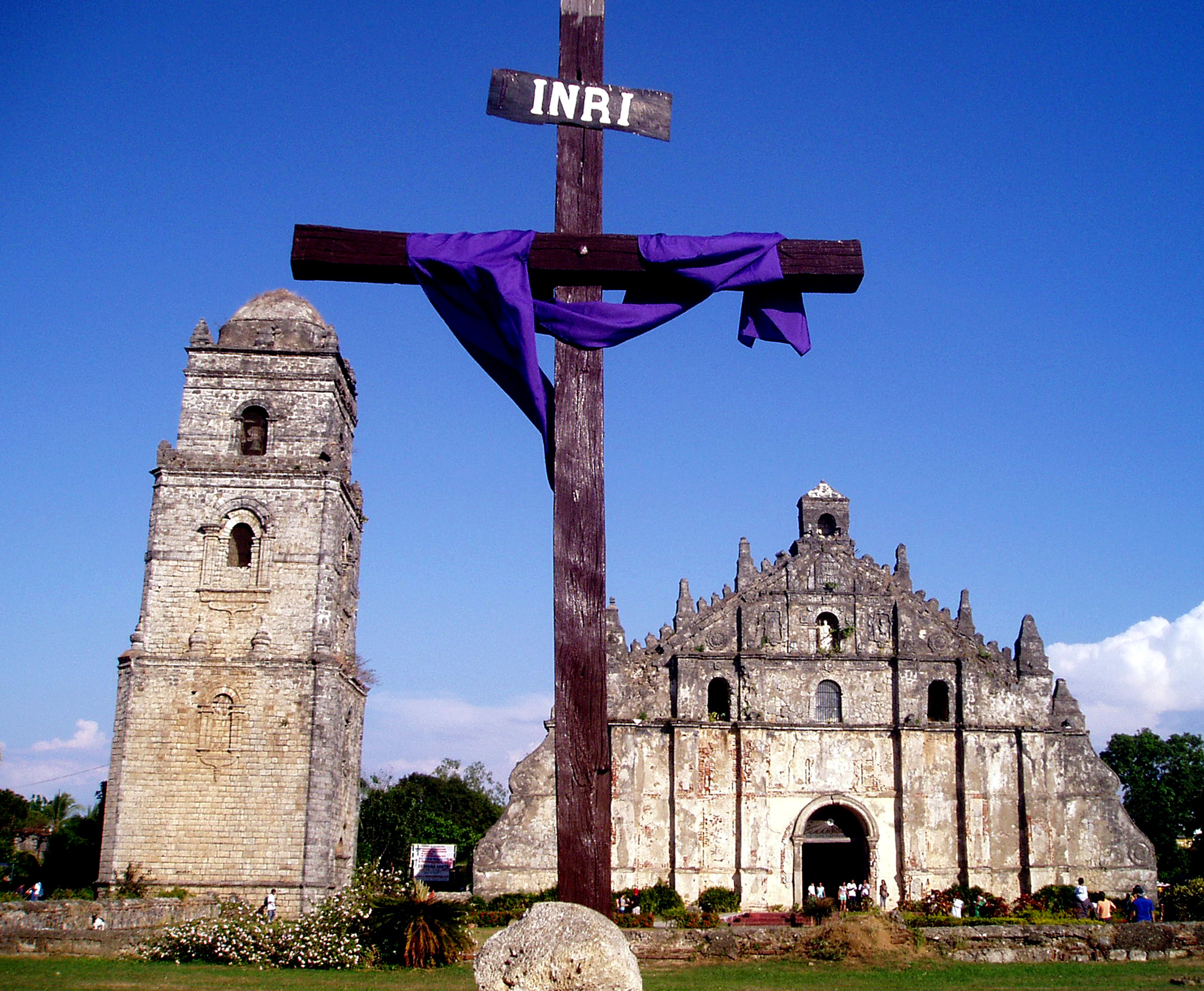
Paoay Church

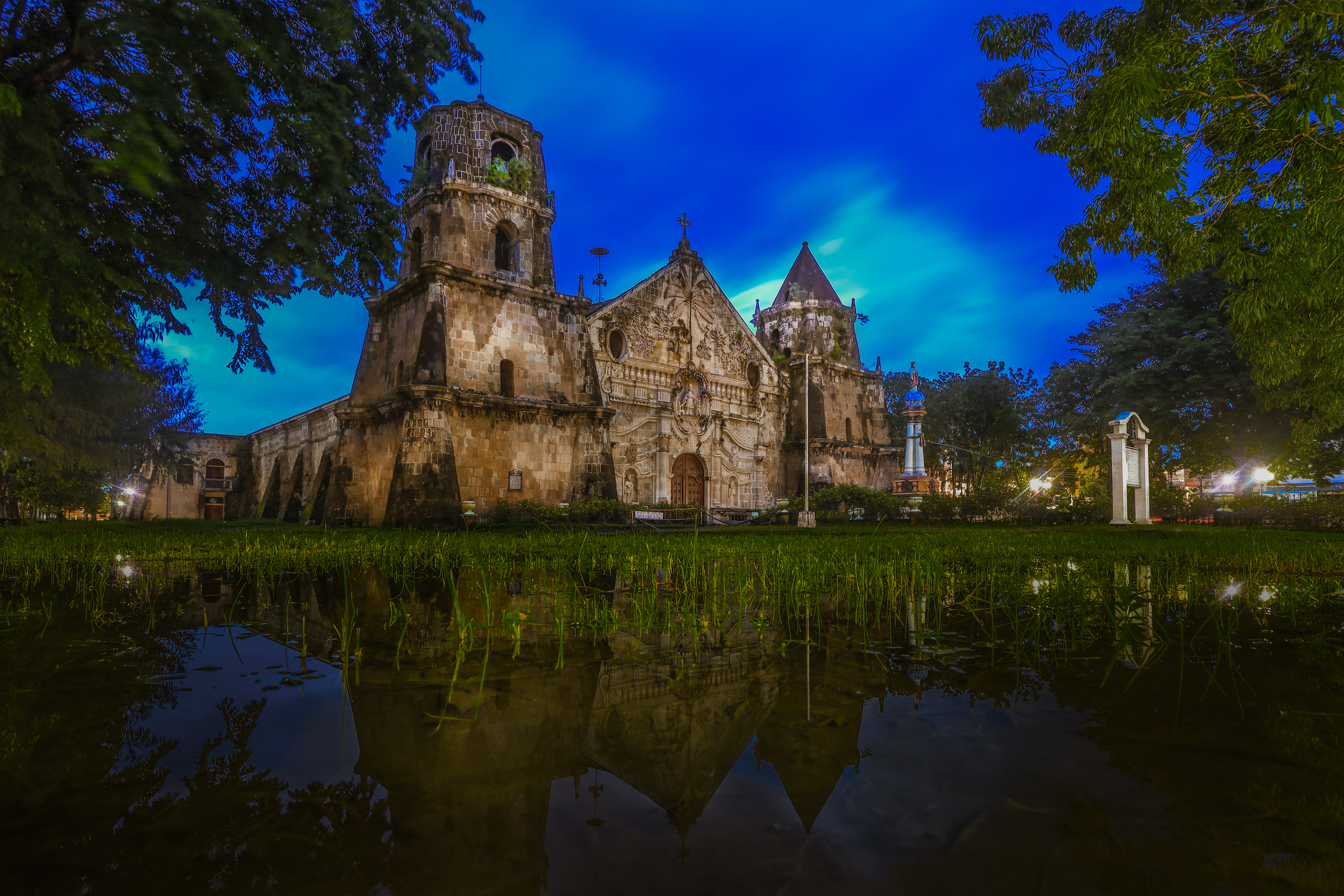
Miagao Church

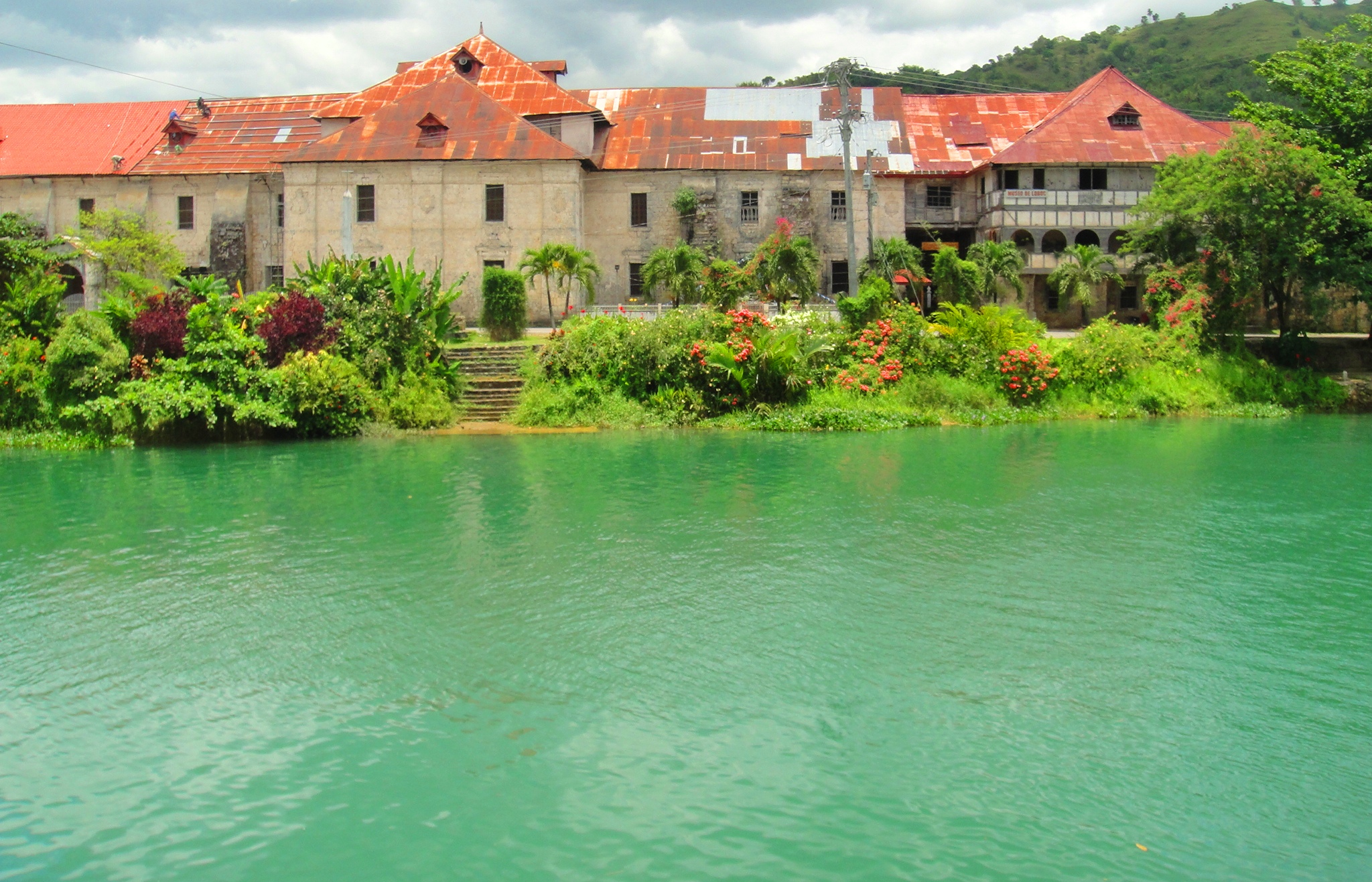
Loboc Church

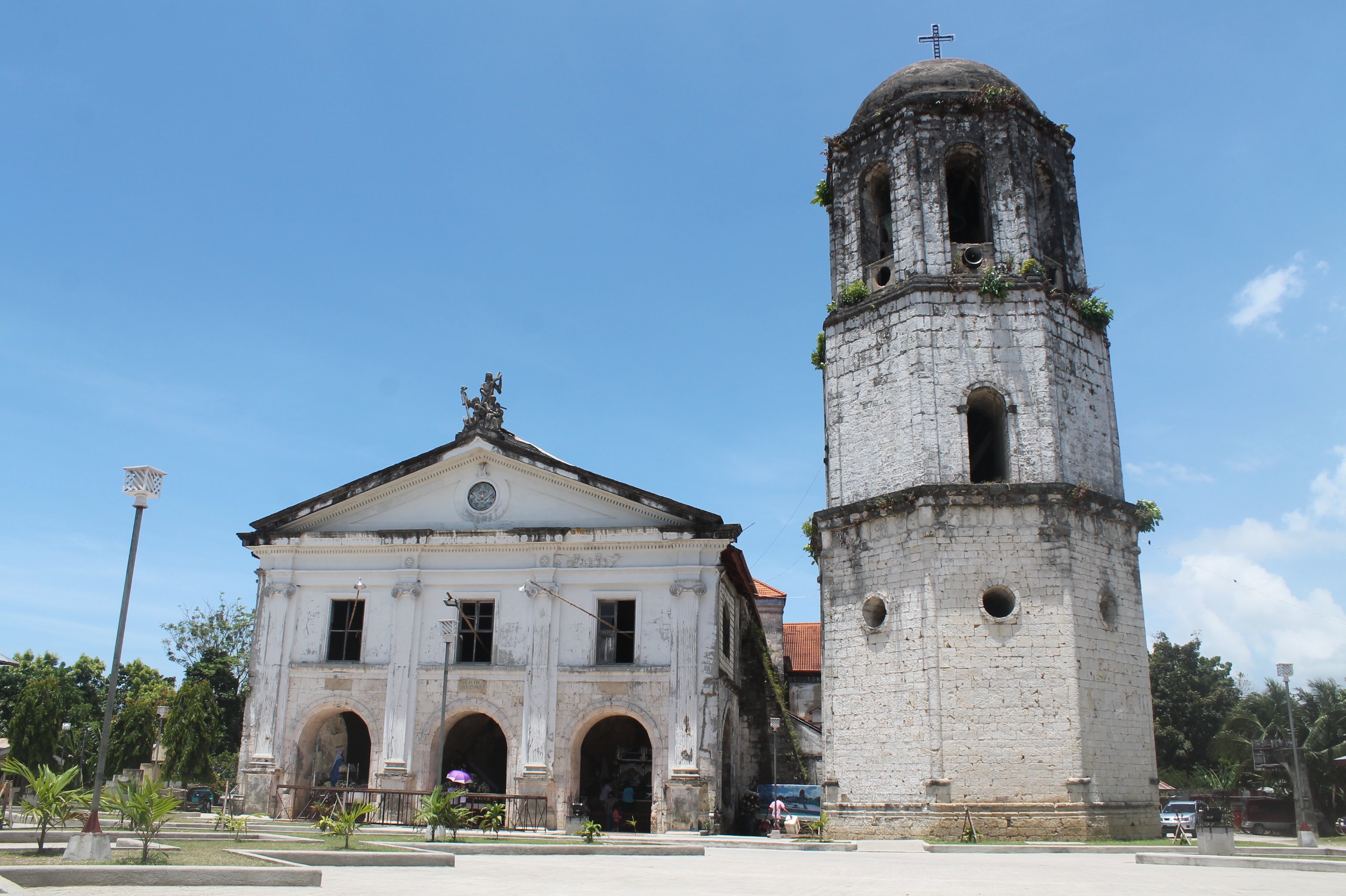
Loay Church

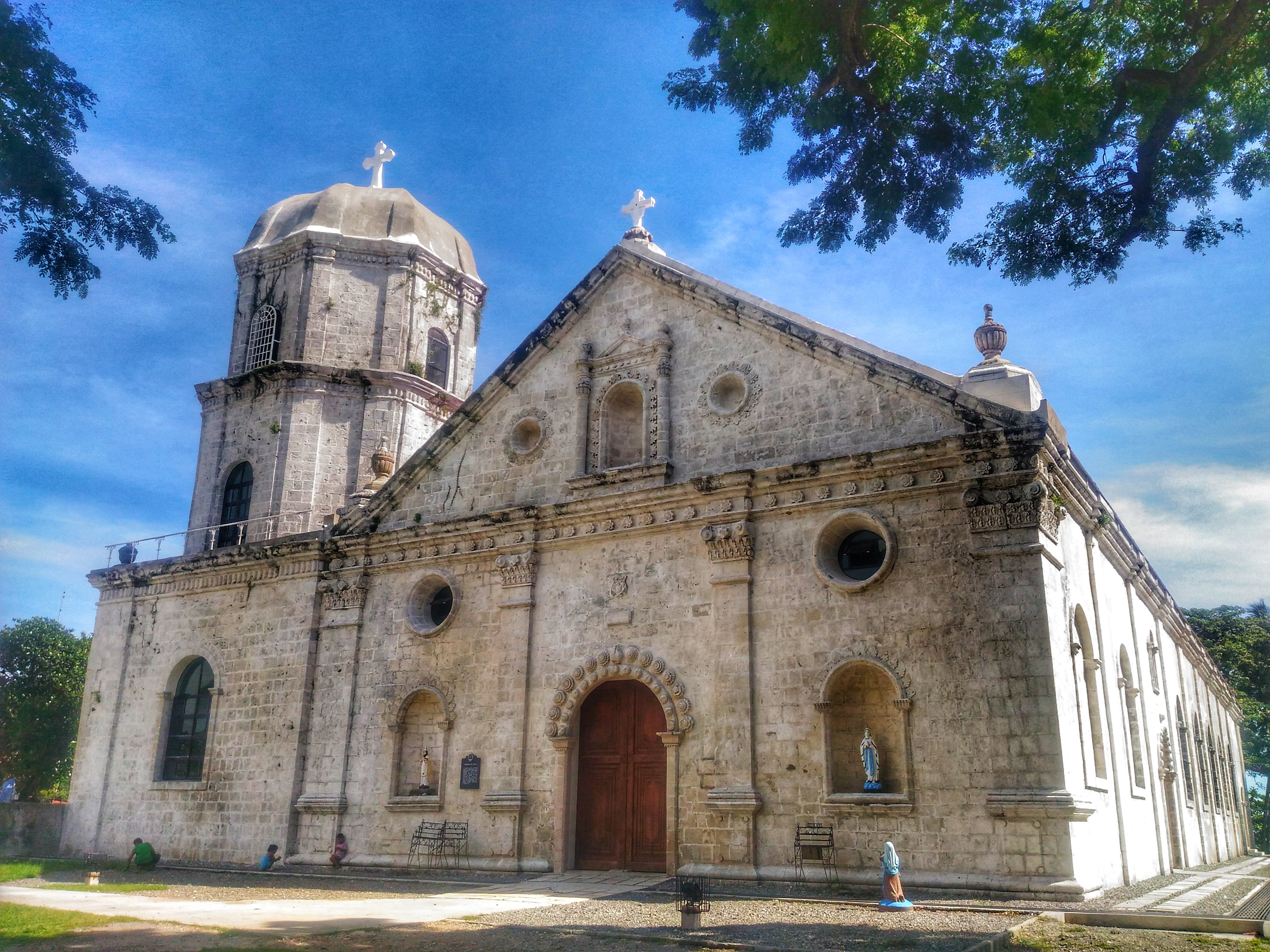
Anini-y Church, Antique

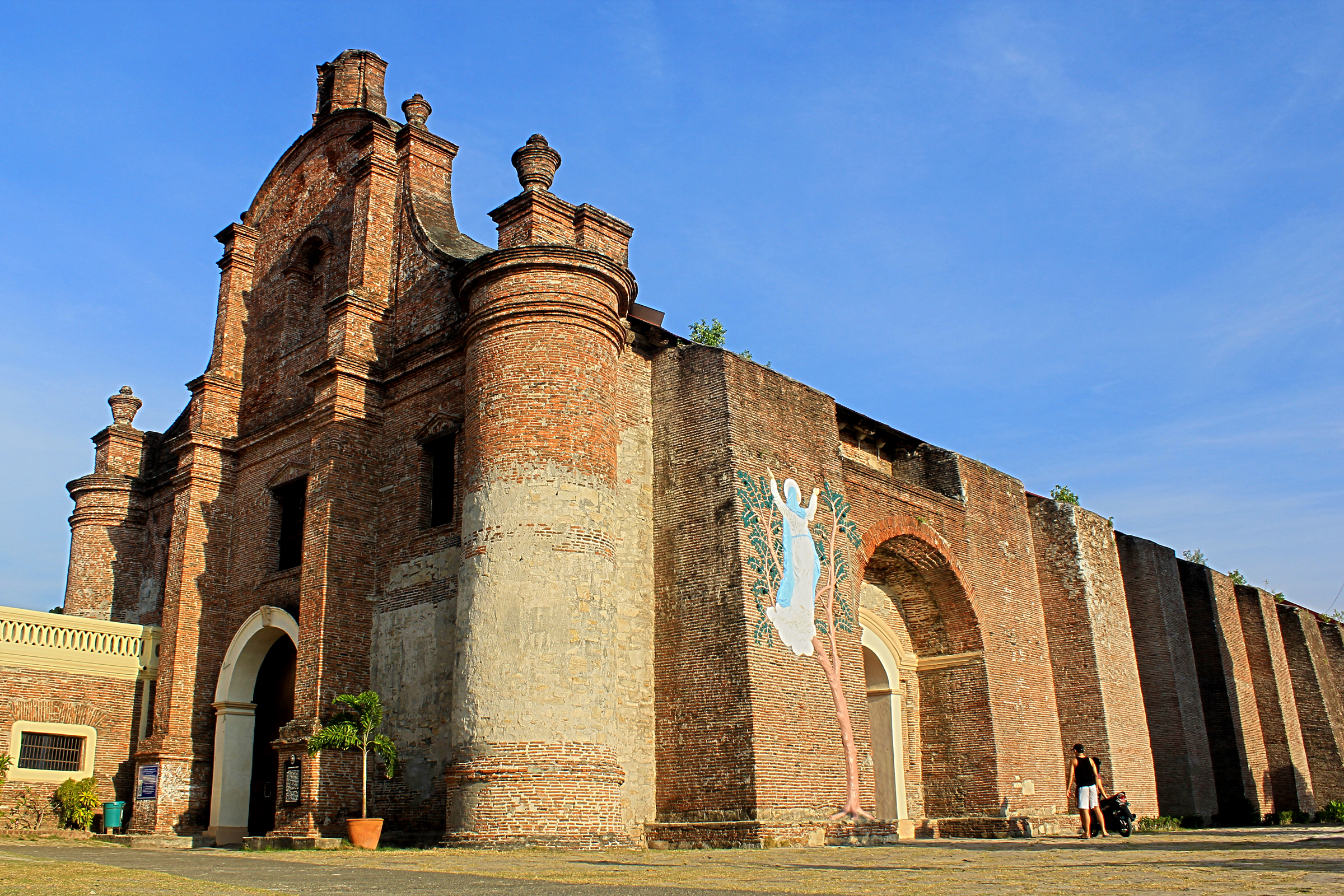
Santa Maria Church (Ilocos Sur)

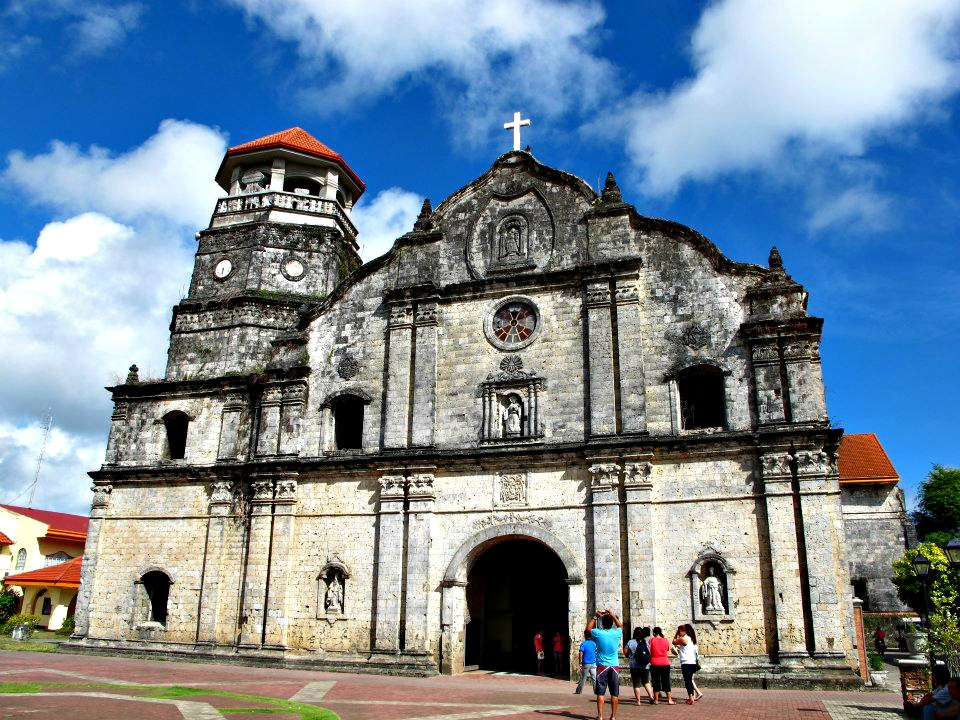
Panay Church

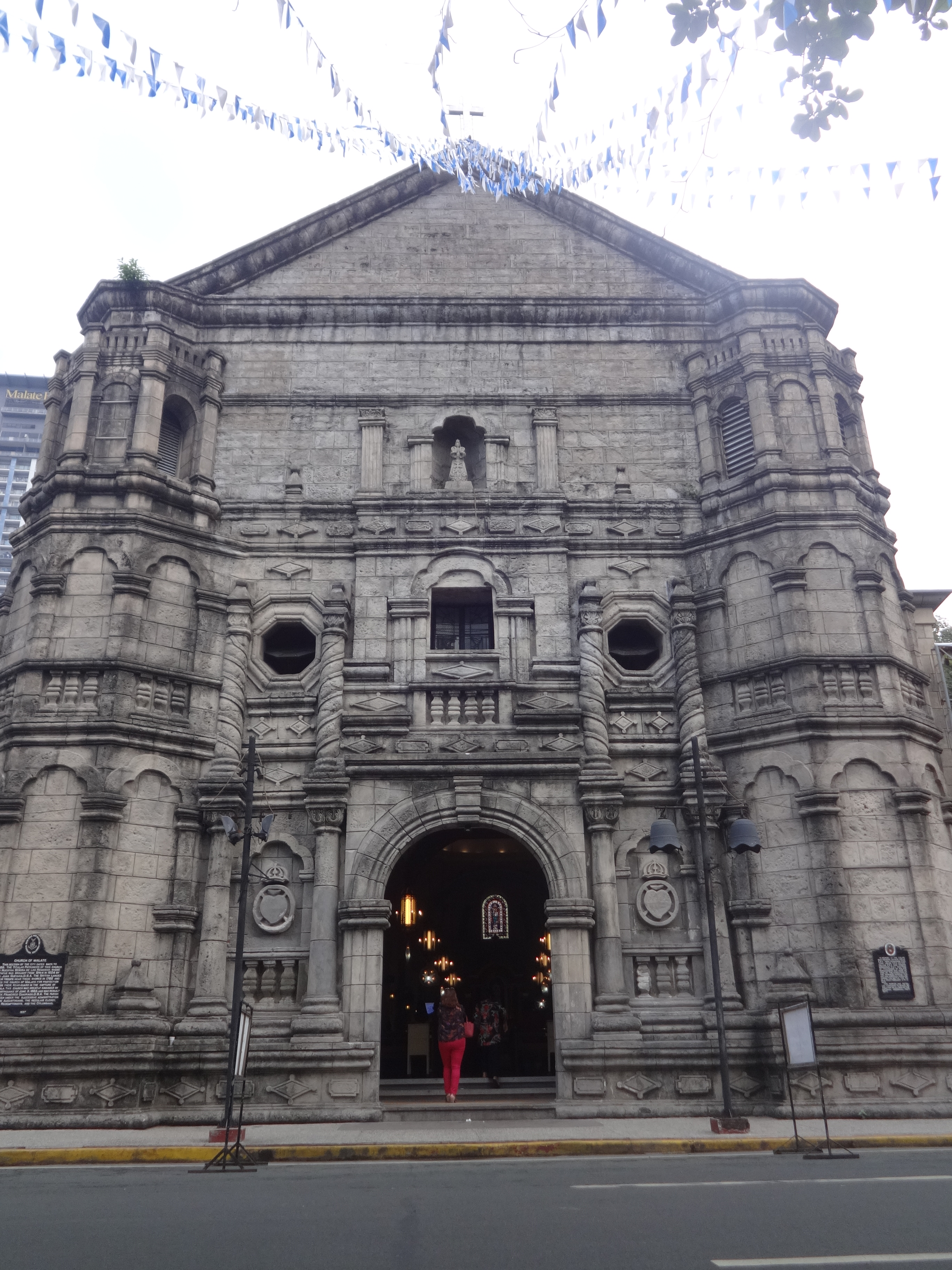
Malate Church

== See also ==
- Baroque Churches of the Philippines
- List of Baroque churches in the Philippines
- List of Catholic churches in the Philippines
- Church architecture
- Spanish Colonial architecture
  - Churrigueresque – Baroque architecture style in Spain
  - Plateresque – Artistic and architectural movement
