= Rizal Provincial Board =

Legislative body of the province of Rizal, Philippines

Rizal Provincial Board Sangguniang Panlalawigan ng Rizal

Type
- Type: Unicameral
- Term limits: 3 terms (9 years)

Leadership
- Presiding Officer: Josefina G. Gatlabayan, Nationalist People's Coalition since June 30, 2025

Structure
- Seats: 14 board members 1 ex officio presiding officer
- Political groups: NPC (7) Nacionalista (1) PFP (1) NUP (1) PDP (1) Nonpartisan (3)
- Length of term: 3 years
- Authority: Local Government Code of the Philippines

Elections
- Voting system: Multiple non-transferable vote (regular members); Indirect election (ex officio members); Acclamation (sectoral member)
- Last election: May 12, 2025
- Next election: May 15, 2028

Meeting place
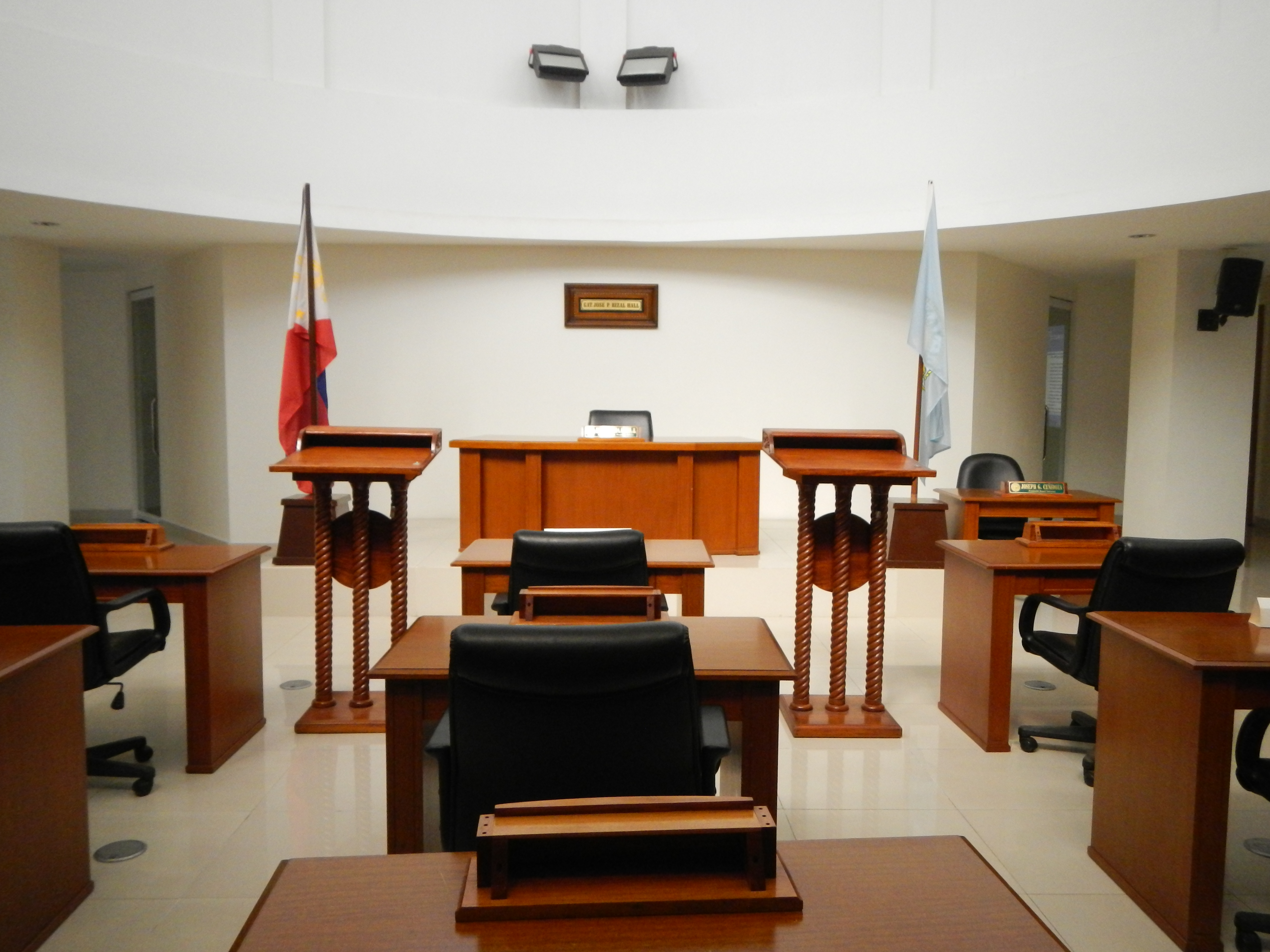
- Gat Jose P. Rizal Hall, Rizal Provincial Capitol, Antipolo

The Rizal Provincial Board is the Sangguniang Panlalawigan (provincial legislature) of the Philippine province of Rizal.

The members are elected via plurality-at-large voting: the province is divided into six districts, the first district of Rizal sending four members, the second district of Rizal sending two members, the third and fourth districts sending one member each, and Antipolo's two districts sending one member each to the provincial board; the number of candidates the electorate votes for and the number of winning candidates depends on the number of members their district sends. The vice governor is the ex officio presiding officer, and only votes to break ties. The vice governor is elected via the plurality voting system province-wide.

The districts used in appropriation of members is coextensive with the legislative districts of Rizal and the legislative districts of Antipolo.

Aside from the regular members, the board also includes the provincial federation presidents of the Liga ng mga Barangay (ABC, from its old name "Association of Barangay Captains"), the Sangguniang Kabataan (SK, youth councils) and the Philippine Councilors League (PCL).

== Apportionment ==
Elections	Seats per district						Ex officio seats	Reserved seats	Total seats
Elections	Rizal–1st	Rizal–2nd	Rizal–3rd	Rizal–4th	Antipolo–1st	Antipolo–2nd	Ex officio seats	Reserved seats	Total seats
1992–1998	5	5	—	—	—	—	3	—	13
2001–2019	4	4	—	—	1	1	3	—	13
2022–present	4	2	1	1	1	1	3	1	14

== List of members ==
=== Current members ===
These are the members after the 2025 local elections and 2023 barangay and SK elections:

- Vice Governor: Josefina G. Gatlabayan (NPC)

Seat	Board member	Party	Start of term	End of term
Rizal's 1st district	Anthony Jesus S. Alarcon	NPC	June 30, 2025	June 30, 2028
Rizal's 1st district	Philip Jeison J. Cruz	NPC	June 30, 2025	June 30, 2028
Rizal's 1st district	Maria Chris Kay S. Ilagan-Conde	NPC	June 30, 2025	June 30, 2028
Rizal's 1st district	Patnubay B. Tiamson	Nacionalista	June 30, 2025	June 30, 2028
Rizal's 2nd district	Ricardo S. Bernados	NPC	June 30, 2022	June 30, 2028
Rizal's 2nd district	Reynaldo H. San Juan Jr.	PFP	June 30, 2025	June 30, 2028
Rizal's 3rd district	John Patrick M. Baustista	PDP	June 30, 2022	June 30, 2028
Rizal's 4th district	Rafhael Roumel V. Ayuson	NPC	June 30, 2022	June 30, 2028
Antipolo's 1st district	Reynaldo Nicolas R. Puno	NUP	June 30, 2025	June 30, 2028
Antipolo's 2nd district	Danilo O. Leyble	NPC	June 30, 2022	June 30, 2028
ABC	Moses M. San Jose	Nonpartisan	November 30, 2023	January 1, 2027
PCL	Hector M. Robles	NPC	June 30, 2025	June 30, 2028
SK	King Arvi A. Ramilo	Nonpartisan	November 30, 2023	January 1, 2027
IPMR	Reynaldo U. Doroteo	Nonpartisan		

=== Vice Governor ===
Election year	Name	Party
1988	Jose M. Barreto Sr.	Liberal
1992	Nicandro D. Natividad	Liberal
1995	Nicandro D. Natividad	Liberal
1998	Benjamin V. Felix	LAMMP
2001	Teodoro O. O'Hara (Note: Lost electoral protest on July 2, 2002.)	NPC
2001	Jovita Cruz-Rodriguez	Lakas
2004	Anthony Jesus S. Alarcon	NPC
2007	Frisco S. San Juan Jr.	NPC
2010	Frisco S. San Juan Jr.	NPC
2013	Frisco S. San Juan Jr.	NPC
2016	Reynaldo H. San Juan Jr.	Liberal
2019	Reynaldo H. San Juan Jr.	PFP
2022	Reynaldo H. San Juan Jr.	PFP
2025	Josefina Galang-Gatlabayan	NPC

=== Rizal's 1st district ===
- City: Antipolo (until 2001)
- Municipalities: Angono, Binangonan, Cainta, Taytay
- Population (2024): 1,239,688

Election year	Member (party)	Member (party)	Member (party)	Member (party)	Member (party)
1992	Virgilio R. Esguerra (Liberal)	Benjamin P. Santos (NPC)	Felipe A. Vital (LDP)	Roman L. Reyes Jr. (Liberal)	Jocelyn B. Merced (Independent)
1995	Virgilio R. Esguerra (Liberal)	Benjamin P. Santos (NPC)	Teodoro O. O'Hara (NPC)	Felipe A. Vital (NPC)	Cesar B. Villones (NPC)
1998	Teodoro O. O'Hara (LAMMP)	Virgilio R. Esguerra (LAMMP)	Felipe A. Vital (LAMMP)	Benjamin P. Santos (LAMMP)	Cesar B. Villones (LAMMP)
2001	Arturo L. Sicat (NPC)	Godofredo C. Valera (Liberal)	Cesar B. Villones (NPC)	Zoilo V. Tolentino Sr. (NPC)	—N/a
2004	Arturo L. Sicat (PMP)	Genato H. Bernardo (PMP)	Benjamin DL. Esguerra Jr. (Independent)	Noel Ireneo E. Reyes (Liberal)	—N/a
2007	Genato H. Bernardo (NPC)	Benjamin DL. Esguerra Jr. (NPC)	Zoilo G. Tolentino Jr. (NPC)	Armando B. Villamayor Sr. (Independent)	—N/a
2010	Benjamin DL. Esguerra Jr. (Liberal)	Genato H. Bernardo (NPC)	Zoilo G. Tolentino Jr. (NPC)	Armando B. Villamayor Sr. (Liberal)	—N/a
2013	Anthony Jesus S. Alarcon (NPC)	Zoilo G. Tolentino Jr. (NPC)	Teodulo C. Del Rosario (Liberal)	Armando B. Villamayor Sr. (Liberal)	—N/a
2016	Anthony Jesus S. Alarcon (NPC)	Fernando R. Cabitac Jr. (NPC)	Genato H. Bernardo (NPC)	Ross Glenn T. Gongora (NPC)	—N/a
2019	Anthony Jesus S. Alarcon (NPC)	Genato H. Bernardo (NPC)	Fernando R. Cabitac Jr. (NPC)	Ross Glenn T. Gongora (NPC)	—N/a
2022	Genato H. Bernardo (NPC)	Fernando R. Cabitac Jr. (NPC)	Jo Anne E. Saguinsin (NPC)	Ross Glenn T. Gongora (NPC)	—N/a
2025	Anthony Jesus S. Alarcon (NPC)	Philip Jeison J. Cruz (NPC)	Maria Chris Kay S. Ilagan-Conde (NPC)	Patnubay B. Tiamson (Nacionalista)	—N/a

=== Rizal's 2nd district ===
- Municipalities: Baras, Cardona, Jalajala, Morong, Pililla, Rodriguez (until 2022), San Mateo (until 2022), Tanay, Teresa
- Population (2024): 535,309

Election year	Member (party)	Member (party)	Member (party)	Member (party)	Member (party)
1992	Rolando P. Rivera (LDP)	Isidro S. Rodriguez Jr. (NPC)	Patrocinio R. Cosep (Liberal)	Esteban H. Benavidez (LDP)	Carmelo M. Sta. Isabel (Liberal)
1995	Rolando P. Rivera (Lakas NUCD–UMDP)	Enrique C. Rodriguez Jr. (Lakas NUCD–UMDP)	Isidro S. Rodriguez Jr. (NPC)	Carmelo M. Sta. Isabel (Liberal)	Jose F. Diaz (NPC)
1998	Jose F. Diaz (LAMMP)	Edwin G. Francisco (Liberal)	Esteban H. Benavidez (LAMMP)	Luis C. Arriola Jr. (Lakas NUCD–UMDP)	Edgardo F. Balajadia (LAMMP)
2001	Dino Tanjuatco (Lakas NUCD–UMDP)	Luis C. Arriola Jr. (NPC)	Virgilio C. Benavidez (NPC)	Edgardo F. Balajadia (NPC)	—N/a
2004	Rolando P. Rivera (Lakas–CMD)	Luis C. Arriola Jr. (PMP)	Virgilio C. Benavidez (PMP)	Edgardo F. Balajadia (PMP)	—N/a
2007	Dino Tanjuatco (KAMPI)	Reynaldo H. San Juan Jr. (Liberal)	Nemesio M. Roxas (NPC)	Arwin A. Mariano (Independent)	—N/a
2010	Dino Tanjuatco (Liberal)	Nemesio M. Roxas (NPC)	Reynaldo H. San Juan Jr. (Liberal)	Arwin A. Mariano (NPC)	—N/a
2013	Dino Tanjuatco (Liberal)	Reynaldo H. San Juan Jr. (Liberal)	Rolando P. Rivera (NPC)	Arwin A. Mariano (NPC)	—N/a
2016	Rommel C. Ayuson (NPC)	Bartolome N. Rivera Jr. (Liberal)	Rolando P. Rivera (NPC)	Olivia F. De Leon (NPC)	—N/a
2019	Bartolome N. Rivera Jr. (Liberal)	Rolando P. Rivera (Note: Died on office.) (PFP)	Dino Tanjuatco (Liberal)	Rommel C. Ayuson (NPC)	—N/a
2022	Ricardo S. Bernardos (NPC)	Hector M. Robles (NPC)	—N/a		
2025	Ricardo S. Bernardos (NPC)	Reynaldo H. San Juan Jr. (PFP)	—N/a		

=== Rizal's 3rd District ===
- Municipality: San Mateo
- Population (2024): 276,449

Election year	Member (party)
2022	John Patrick M. Bautista (NPC)
2025	John Patrick M. Bautista (PDP)

=== Rizal's 4th district ===
- Municipality: Rodriguez
- Population (2024): 451,383

Election year	Member (party)
2022	Rommel C. Ayuson (NPC)
2025	Rafhael Roumel V. Ayuson (NPC)

=== Antipolo's lone district (2001–2004) ===
- Barangays: Bagong Nayon, Beverly Hills, Calawis, Cupang, Dalig, Dela Paz, Inarawan, Mambugan, Mayamot, Muntingdilaw, Santa Cruz, San Isidro San Luis, San Jose, San Juan, San Roque
- Population (2000): 470,866

Election year	Member (party)
2001	Jesus D. Palileo (NPC)

=== Antipolo's 1st district ===
- Barangays: Bagong Nayon, Beverly Hills, Dela Paz, Mambugan, Mayamot, Muntingdilaw, Santa Cruz, San Isidro
- Population (2024): 391,807

Election year	Member (party)
2004	Jesus D. Palileo (PMP)
2007	Arnel M. Camacho (KAMPI)
2010	Ronald R. Barcena (NPC)
2013	Enrico C. De Guzman (NUP)
2016	Enrico C. De Guzman (NUP)
2019	Roberto Andres R. Puno Jr. (NUP)
2022	Roberto Andres R. Puno Jr. (NUP)
2025	Reynaldo Nicolas R. Puno (NUP)

=== Antipolo's 2nd district ===
- Barangays: Calawis, Cupang, Dalig, Inarawan, San Luis, San Jose, San Juan, San Roque
- Population (2024): 521,905

Election year	Member (party)
2004	Zacarias L. Tapales (PMP)
2007	Zacarias L. Tapales (NPC)
2010	Jesus Angelito Y. Huertas Jr. (Lakas–Kampi)
2013	Jesus Angelito Y. Huertas Jr. (NPC)
2016	Jesus Angelito Y. Huertas Jr. (NPC)
2019	Alexander S. Marquez (NPC)
2022	Danilo O. Leyble (NPC)
2025	Danilo O. Leyble (NPC)
