= 2013 Rizal local elections =

Philippine election

2013 Rizal gubernatorial election
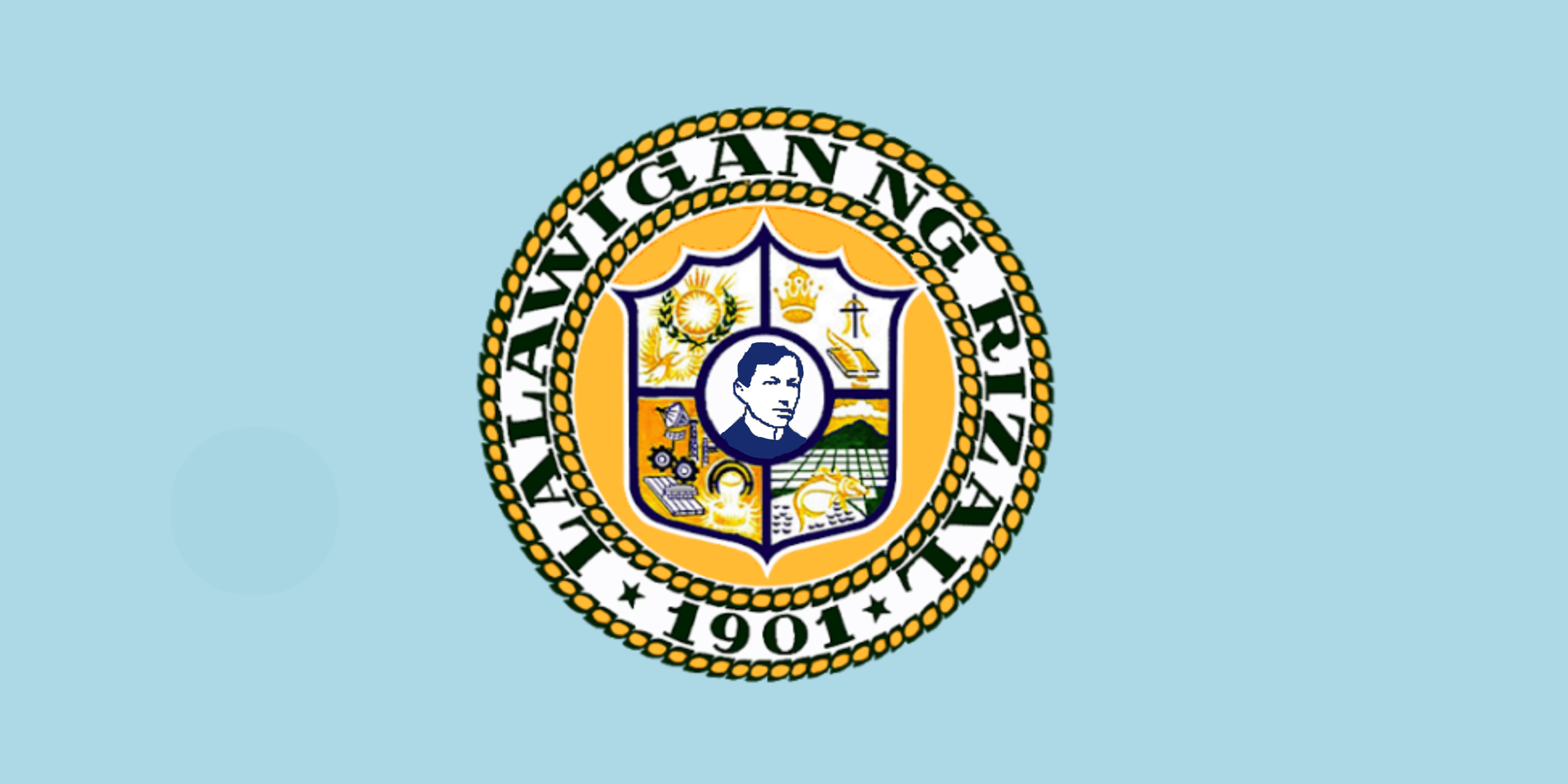
← 2010	May 13, 2013	2016 →
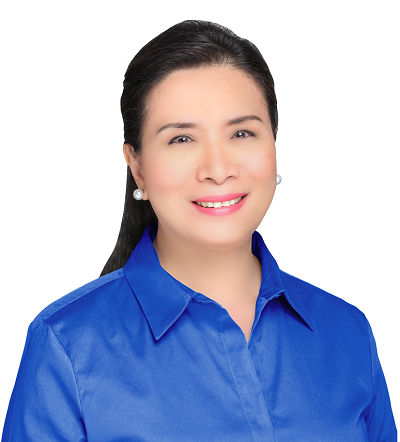
Nominee	Rebecca A. Ynares	Esteban B. Salonga	Anamariela M. Bush
Party	NPC	Independent	Independent
Running mate	Frisco S. San Juan Jr.
Popular vote	502,850	134,876	8,349
Percentage	77.83	20.88	1.29
Governor before election
Casimiro "Jun" Ynares III
NPC
Elected Governor
Rebecca A. Ynares
NPC

Local elections were held in Rizal on May 13, 2013, as part of the 2013 general election. Voters will select candidates for all local positions: a municipal/city mayor, vice mayor and town councilors, as well as members of the Sangguniang Panlalawigan, the vice-governor, governor and representatives for the two districts of Rizal.

== Results ==
=== For Governor ===
Former Governor Rebecca "Nini" Ynares won the elections.

Rizal gubernatorial election
Party	Candidate	Votes	%
NPC	Rebecca "Nini" Ynares	502,850	77.83
Independent	Esteban B. Salonga	134,876	20.88
Independent	Anamariela M. Bush	8,349	1.29
Total votes		646,075	100.00

=== For Vice Governor ===
Vice Governor Frisco San Juan Jr. was re-elected unopposed.

Rizal vice gubernatorial election
Party	Candidate	Votes	%
NPC	Frisco San Juan Jr.	423,694	
Total votes			
NPC hold			

== Congressional elections ==
=== 1st District ===
Joel Duavit is running for reelection unopposed.

2013 Philippine House of Representatives election at Rizal's 1st district
Party	Candidate	Votes	%	±%
NPC	Joel R. Duavit	192,841	75.08	
Invalid or blank votes		63,991	24.92	
Total votes		256,832	100.00	
NPC hold				

=== 2nd District ===
Isidro Rodriguez Jr. is running for reelection unopposed.

2013 Philippine House of Representatives election at Rizal's 2nd district
Party	Candidate	Votes	%	±%
NPC	Isidro S. Rodriguez Jr.	163,416	64.34	
Invalid or blank votes		90,591	35.66	
Total votes		254,007	100.00	
NPC hold				

=== 1st District ===
2013 Philippine House of Representatives election at Antipolo's 1st district
Party	Candidate	Votes	%
NUP	Roberto Puno	73,944	67.34
Independent	Francisco Sumulong, Jr.	18,058	16.44
Independent	Dioscoro Esteban, Jr.	2,822	2.57
Independent	Florante Quizon	1,379	1.26
Independent	Raldy Abano	741	0.67
Margin of victory		55,886	50.90%
Invalid or blank votes		12,856	11.71
Total votes		109,800	100.00
NUP hold			

=== 2nd District ===
Romeo Acop is the incumbent.

2013 Philippine House of Representatives election at Antipolo's 2nd district
Party	Candidate	Votes	%
Liberal	Romeo Acop	64,798	56.35
PDP–Laban	Lorenzo Sumulong III	38,773	33.72
Independent	Silverio Bulanon	1,024	0.89
Margin of victory		26,025	22.63%
Invalid or blank votes		10,397	9.04
Total votes		114,992	100.00
Liberal hold			

== Provincial Board elections ==
All 2 Districts of Rizal will elect Sangguniang Panlalawigan or provincial board members.

=== 1st District ===
- Municipalities: Angono, Binangonan, Cainta, Taytay

Parties are as stated in their certificate of candidacies.

Rizal 1st District Board Member election
Party	Candidate	Votes	%
NPC	Anthony Jesus S. Alarcon	166,229	
NPC	Zoilo G. Tolentino Jr.	109,790	
Liberal	Teodulo C. Del Rosario	95,110	
Liberal	Armando B. Villamayor	79,680	
Independent	Pedro B. San Felipe	54,065	
Independent	Frederick John J. Francisco	48,707	
Independent	Jeffrey T. Santos	38,710	
Independent	Tito T. Perez	29,577	
Total votes			

=== 2nd District ===
- Municipalities: Baras, Cardona, Jala-Jala, Morong, Pililla, Rodriguez (Montalban), San Mateo, Tanay, Teresa

Parties are as stated in their certificate of candidacies.

Rizal 2nd District Board Member election
Party	Candidate	Votes	%
Liberal	Emigidio P. Tanjuatco	126,180	
Liberal	Reynaldo H. San Juan Jr.	109,298	
NPC	Rolando P. Rivera	101,295	
NPC	Arwin A. Mariano	98,972	
Independent	Ariel V. Gutierrez	42,480	
Independent	Cirilo V. Oropesa	33,282	
Independent	Maximo E. Pasay Jr.	25,103	
Total votes			

=== Antipolo ===
==== 1st District ====
Parties are as stated in their certificate of candidacies.

Antipolo 1st District Board Member election
Party	Candidate	Votes	%
NUP	Enrico C. De Guzman	42,315	
Liberal	Ernesto M. Prias	30,690	
PDP–Laban	Sonia L. Ampo	12,105	
Independent	Telesforo M. Machon	1,437	
Independent	Jerrico B. Avecilla	1,134	
Total votes			

==== 2nd District ====
Parties are as stated in their certificate of candidacies.

Antipolo 2nd District Board Member election
Party	Candidate	Votes	%
NPC	Jesus Angeito Y. Huertas Jr.	47,463	
Liberal	Marchito G. Sorono	23,736	
PDP–Laban	Nixon R. Aranas	19,422	
Total votes			

== City and Municipality Elections ==
All municipalities and City of Antipolo in Rizal will elect mayor and vice-mayor this election. The candidates for mayor and vice mayor with the highest number of votes wins the seat; they are voted separately, therefore, they may be of different parties when elected. Below is the list of mayoralty and vice-mayoralty candidates of each city and municipalities per district.

=== 1st District ===
- Municipalities: Angono, Binangonan, Cainta, Taytay

==== Angono ====
Angono mayoral election
Party	Candidate	Votes	%
NPC	Gerardo Calderon	19,381	
Liberal	Virtus Gil	6,960	
Total votes		26,341	

==== Binangonan ====
Binangonan mayoral election
Party	Candidate	Votes	%
NPC	Boyet Ynares	49,121	
Aksyon	Manuel Reyes Sr.	5,660	
Total votes		54,781	

==== Cainta ====
Cainta mayoral election
Party	Candidate	Votes	%
UNA	Kit Nieto	28,515	
NPC	Veron Ilagan	23,401	
Nacionalista	Willy Felix	20,328	
Liberal	Arturo Sicat	14,315	
Independent	Recto Tagabuhin	404	
Total votes		86,963	

==== Taytay ====
Taytay mayoral election
Party	Candidate	Votes	%
NPC	Janet Dolores Mercado De Leon	35,517	
Liberal	Joan Angela Yoingco Gacula	33,397	
Independent	Jessica Candor De Leon	3,292	
Total votes		72,206	

=== 2nd District ===
- Municipalities: Baras, Cardona, Jala-Jala, Morong, Pililla, Rodriguez (Montalban), San Mateo, Tanay, Teresa

==== Baras ====
Baras mayoral election
Party	Candidate	Votes	%
Independent	Katherine Robles	10,358	
PDP–Laban	Roberto Ferrera	4,179	
Liberal	Ulysses Olano	3,003	
Total votes		17,540	

==== Cardona ====
Cardona mayoral election
Party	Candidate	Votes	%
NPC	Bernardo San Juan Jr.	11,983	
Independent	Rogelio Felix	1,340	
Independent	Rogelio Manzana	422	
Total votes		13,745	

==== Jala-Jala ====
Jala-Jala mayoral election
Party	Candidate	Votes	%
UNA	Narciso Villaran	6,528	
Liberal	Jolet Delos Santos	6,072	
Nacionalista	Bobot Gellido	885	
PMP	Ador Membreve	555	
Total votes		14,040	

==== Morong ====
Morong mayoral election
Party	Candidate	Votes	%
UNA	Armando San Juan	7,902	
NPC	Olivia De Leon	5,160	
Liberal	Ricardo Angeles Jr.	7,903	
Total votes		17,792	

==== Pililla ====
Pililla mayoral election
Party	Candidate	Votes	%
Nacionalista	Leandro Masikip Sr.	12,557	
Liberal	Jaime Paz	9,195	
PDP–Laban	Willy Sia	2,047	
Independent	Erwin Castelo	182	
Total votes		23,981	

==== Rodriguez (Montalban) ====
Rodriguez (Montalban) mayoral election
Party	Candidate	Votes	%
Liberal	Cecilio Hernandez	32,879	
Aksyon	Roy Cuerpo	17,268	
Independent	Gregorio San Diego Jr.	10,270	
Independent	Alex Ignacio	160	
Independent	Nestor Palugod	101	
Total votes		60,678	

==== San Mateo ====
San Mateo mayoral election
Party	Candidate	Votes	%
NPC	Jose Rafael Diaz	32,036	
UNA	Jimmy Roxas	22,740	
Total votes		54,776	

==== Tanay ====
Tanay mayoral election
Party	Candidate	Votes	%
Liberal	Rafael Tanjuatco	13,042	
Independent	Pacostarr Estrella	1,656	
Total votes		14,698	

==== Teresa ====
Teresa mayoral election
Party	Candidate	Votes	%
Liberal	Raul Palino	13,474	
NPC	Edwin Francisco	9,303	
Total votes		22,777	

=== Antipolo ===
Antipolo mayoral election
Party	Candidate	Votes	%
NPC	Casimiro Ynares III	128,108	51.14
Liberal	Danilo Leyble	121,032	48.32
Independent	Jose M. Velasco	1,366	0.55
Margin of victory		7,076	2.82
Valid ballots		250,506	99.13
Invalid or blank votes		2,199	0.87
Total votes		252,705	100.00
NPC gain from Liberal			
