= 2016 Rizal local elections =

Philippine election

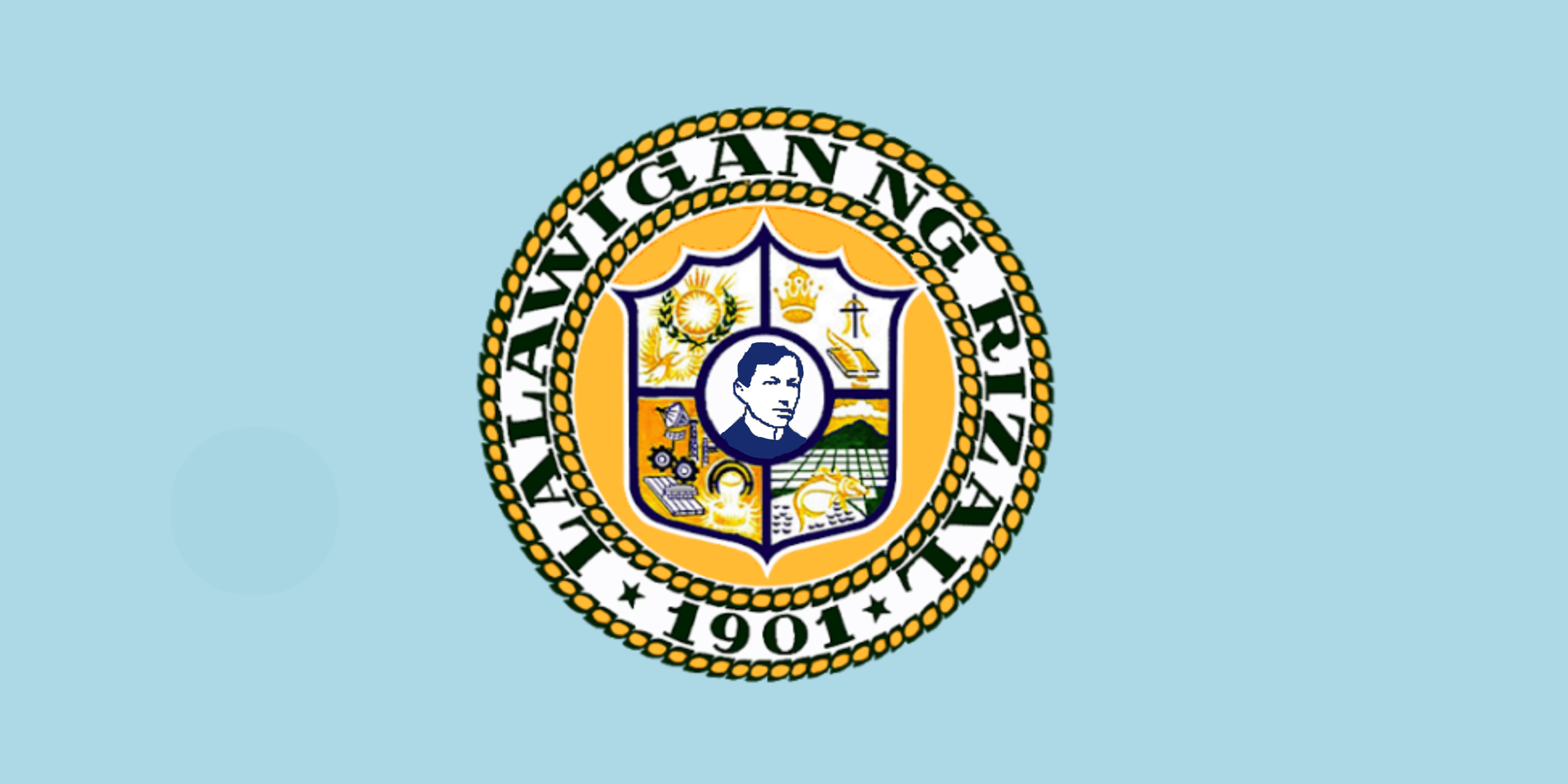
← 2013	May 9, 2016	2019 →
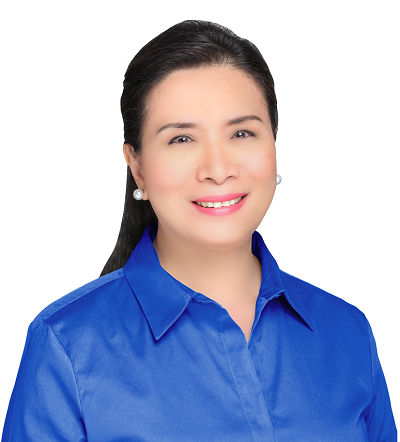
Nominee	Rebecca "Nini" Ynares
Party	NPC
Running mate	Reynaldo "Junrey" San Juan Jr. Liberal
Popular vote	767,909
Governor before election
Rebecca Ynares
NPC
Elected Governor
Rebecca Ynares
NPC

Local elections were held in the Province of Rizal on May 9, 2016 as part of the 2016 general election. Voters selected candidates for all local positions: a municipal/city mayor, vice mayor and town councilors, as well as members of the Sangguniang Panlalawigan, the governor, vice-governor and representatives for the two districts of Rizal.

== Provincial Elections Results ==
=== For Governor ===
Governor Rebecca "Nini" Ynares defeated her closest rival Esteban Salonga in a huge margin.

Rizal Gubernatorial Elections
Party	Candidate	Votes	%
NPC	Rebecca "Nini" Ynares	767,909	87.35
Independent	Esteban "Steve" Salonga	84,056	9.56
Independent	Jose Velasco	21,123	2.40
Independent	Silverio "Ver" Bulanon	6,019	0.69
Total votes		879,107	100.00%
NPC hold			

=== For Vice Governor ===
Board Member Reynaldo "Junrey" San Juan Jr. defeated Reynaldo Manuel.

Rizal Vice-Gubernatorial Elections
Party	Candidate	Votes	%
Liberal	Reynaldo "Junrey" San Juan Jr.	519,941	72.36
Independent	Reynaldo "Rey" Manuel	96,868	13.48
Independent	Gherry Guillergan	77,458	10.78
Independent	Gregorio "Greg" Dacdac	24,270	3.38
Total votes		718,537	100.00
NPC hold			

=== For Representatives ===
==== First District ====
Michael John "Jack" Duavit Duavit won the elections.

Rizal Congressional Elections for First District
Party	Candidate	Votes	%
NPC	Michael John "Jack" Duavit	245,791	
Liberal	Avelino "Lino" Zapanta	24,510	
PDP–Laban	Willfrido "Boy" Naval	13,732	
PBM	Tito Perez	8,805	
Independent	Jerry Barbacena	4,621	
Total votes			
NPC hold			

==== Second District ====
Rep. Isidro Rodriguez Jr. was re-elected.

Rizal Congressional Elections for Second District
Party	Candidate	Votes	%
NPC	Isidro Rodriguez Jr.	220,018	
PMP	Luisa Ayuson	38,903	
Liberal	Omar Mohammad Fajardo	19,761	
Nacionalista	Usman Zaide	4,366	
Total votes			
NPC hold			

==== Antipolo's First District ====
Chiqui Roa-Puno defeated First District Councilor Juanito "Dudok" Lawis.

Congressional Elections in Antipolo's First District
Party	Candidate	Votes	%
NUP	Chiqui Roa-Puno	102,093	
Aksyon	Juanito "Dudok" Lawis	17,183	
Independent	Sonia Ampo	4,279	
Independent	Florante Quizon	2,004	
Total votes			
NUP hold			

==== Antipolo's Second District ====
Rep. Romeo Acop won unopposed.

Congressional Elections in Antipolo's Second District
Party	Candidate	Votes	%
Liberal	Romeo Acop	128,309	
Total votes			
Liberal hold			

=== For Provincial Board Members ===
==== First District ====
- Municipalities: Angono, Binangonan, Cainta, Taytay

Rizal Board Member Elections for First District
Party	Candidate	Votes	%
NPC	Anthony Jesus Alarcon	235,784	
NPC	Fernando "Jun" Cabitac	177,166	
NPC	Genato "Dok Ato" Bernardo	153,162	
NPC	Ross Glenn Gongora	133,618	
Independent	Reynaldo Padilla	62,829	
Independent	Oliver Resurreccion	48,845	
Independent	Dominga Madriaga	42,017	
Independent	Arthur Tuppal II	39,362	
Independent	Catalino "Noli" Dazo	31,823	
Independent	Darren Marco "Roy" Bada	12,086	
Total votes			

==== Second District ====
- Municipalities: Baras, Cardona, Jala-Jala, Morong, Pililla, Rodriguez (Montalban), San Mateo, Tanay, Teresa

Rizal Board Member Elections for Second District
Party	Candidate	Votes	%
NPC	Rommel Ayuson	164,109	
Liberal	Bartolome "Omie" Rivera	156,999	
NPC	Rolando Rivera	143,236	
NPC	Olivia de Leon	135,345	
Liberal	Froilan Sales	76,397	
LDP	Gabriel Francisco Ramirez	57,510	
KBL	Mark Ian Buenviaje	56,848	
KBL	Ariel Gutierrez	51,115	
KBL	Jose "Joe" Cordova	35,114	
KBL	Cirilo Oropesa Jr.	24,445	
KBL	Ramir Caña	14,018	
Total votes			

==== Antipolo's First District ====
Enrico "Doc Rico" de Guzman was re-elected for third and final term.

Board Member Elections for Antipolo's First District
Party	Candidate	Votes	%
NUP	Enrico "Doc Rico" de Guzman	76,465	
Independent	Neptalie Allan Nalog	14,733	
Independent	Myrnaflor Quizon	12,218	
Total votes			
NUP hold			

==== Antipolo's Second District ====
Jesus Angelito "Joel" Huertas was re-elected for third and final term.

Board Member Elections for Antipolo's Second District
Party	Candidate	Votes	%
NPC	Jesus Angelito "Joel" Huertas	85,951	
Independent	Ismael "Samuel" Rivera	25,971	
Total votes			
NPC hold			

== City and Municipality Elections Results ==
All municipalities and the City of Antipolo in Rizal elected a mayor and vice-mayor this election. The candidates for mayor and vice mayor with the highest number of votes won the seat; they are voted separately, therefore, they can be of different parties when elected. Below is the list of mayoralty and vice-mayoralty candidates of each city and municipalities per district.

=== First District ===
- Municipalities: Angono, Binangonan, Cainta, Taytay

==== Angono ====
Mayor Gerardo "Gerry" Calderon was re-elected.

Angono Mayoral Elections
Party	Candidate	Votes	%
NPC	Gerardo "Gerry" Calderon	36,260	
Independent	Gil Virtus	7,482	
Independent	Aquileo Fuentes	709	
Total votes			
NPC hold			

Vice Mayor Antonio "Sonny" Rubin was re-elected unopposed.

Angono Vice Mayoral Elections
Party	Candidate	Votes	%
NPC	Antonio "Sonny" Rubin	37,617	
Total votes			
NPC hold			

==== Binangonan ====
Former Mayor Cesar Ynares won the elections.

Binangonan Mayoral Elections
Party	Candidate	Votes	%
NPC	Cesar Ynares	67,526	
Independent	Tex Reyes	11,274	
Total votes			
NPC hold			

Mayor Cecilio Ynares was elected as vice mayor.

Binangonan Vice Mayoral Elections
Party	Candidate	Votes	%
NPC	Cecilio "Boyet" Ynares	63,709	
Independent	Roland Fineza	14,725	
Total votes			
NPC hold			

==== Cainta ====
Mayor Johnielle Keith Nieto was re-elected as mayor.

Cainta Mayoral Elections
Party	Candidate	Votes	%
NPC	Johnielle Keith Nieto	108,243	96.52%
Independent	Lanie Reyes	2,972	2.65%
Independent	Adring Landicho	926	0.82%
Total votes			
NPC hold			

Vice Mayor Sofia "Pia" Velasco was re-elected as vice-mayor.

Cainta Vice Mayoral Elections
Party	Candidate	Votes	%
NPC	Sofia "Pia" Velasco	78,841	
Independent	Giovanni "Jino" Alcantara	25,434	
Independent	Maricor De Venecia	3,608	
Total votes			
NPC hold			

==== Taytay ====
Mayor Janet De Leon-Mercado was defeated by former mayor George Ricardo Gacula.

Taytay Mayoral Elections
Party	Candidate	Votes	%
Liberal	George Ricardo "Joric" Gacula	42,611	44.65%
NPC	Janet De Leon-Mercado	30,642	32.11%
PMP	Joseph "JV" Valera	21,204	22.22%
PBM	Aser Ram	974	1.02%
Total votes		95,431	100.00%
Liberal hold			

Vice Mayor Carlito Gonzaga was re-elected.

Taytay Vice Mayoral Elections
Party	Candidate	Votes	%
NPC	Carlito "Bonoy" Gonzaga	42,539	46.77%
Nacionalista	Boknay Leonardo	28,632	31.48%
PMP	Joan Parrilla-Calderon	17,495	19.24%
Independent	Ver Santos	2,287	2.51%
Total votes		90,953	100.00%
NPC hold			

=== Second District ===
- Municipalities: Baras, Cardona, Jala-Jala, Morong, Pililla, Rodriguez (Montalban), San Mateo, Tanay, Teresa

==== Baras ====
Katherine Robles was re-elected.

Baras Mayoral Elections
Party	Candidate	Votes	%
NPC	Katherine Robles	14,731	
KP	Dandy Coronel	5,830	
Independent	Edwin Ferrera	1,463	
PBM	Crisostomo Dilidili	456	
Total votes			
NPC hold			

Willfredo Robles was re-elected.

Baras Vice Mayoral Elections
Party	Candidate	Votes	%
NPC	Wilfredo Robles	15,158	
KKK	Norberto Bantillo	4,163	
PBM	Cecilia Lumahan	1,284	
Total votes			
NPC hold			

==== Cardona ====
Mayor Bernardo San Juan was re-elected unopposed.

Cardona Mayoral Elections
Party	Candidate	Votes	%
NPC	Bernardo San Juan Jr.	14,201	100.00%
Total votes		14,201	100.00%
NPC hold			

Vice Mayor Teodulo "Totoy" Campo was re-elected unopposed.

Cardona vice mayoral election
Party	Candidate	Votes	%
Liberal	Teodulo "Totoy" Campo	14,453	100.00%
Total votes		14,453	100.00%
Liberal hold			

==== Jala-Jala ====
Former Mayor Elionor Pillas won the elections unopposed.

Jala-Jala Mayoral Elections
Party	Candidate	Votes	%
NPC	Elionor "Ely" Pillas	10,811	100.00%
Total votes		10,811	100.00%
NPC hold			

Mayor Narciso Villaran was defeated by Jose "Jolet" Delos Santos.

Jala-Jala Vice Mayoral Elections
Party	Candidate	Votes	%
Liberal	Jose "Jolet" Delos Santos	7,388	
NPC	Narciso "Narcing" Villaran	7,180	
Total votes		14,568	100.00%
Liberal hold			

==== Morong ====
Mayor Armando San Juan defeated Vice Mayor Joseph Buenaventura.

Morong Mayoral Elections
Party	Candidate	Votes	%
UNA	Armando San Juan	12,006	
NPC	Julian Joseph "JJ" de Ungria	8,790	
Liberal	Joseph Buenaventura	6,301	
Total votes			
UNA hold			

Ricardo Halina won the elections.

Morong Vice Mayoral Elections
Party	Candidate	Votes	%
UNA	Ricardo Halina	15,831	
Liberal	Dagul Reyes	8,910	
Total votes			
UNA hold			

==== Pililla ====
Dan Masinsin defeated his closest rival, Anna Masikip, daughter of Mayor Leandro Masikip Sr.

Pililla Mayoral Elections
Party	Candidate	Votes	%
Liberal	Dan Masinsin	11,156	
Nacionalista	Anna Masikip	9,797	
UNA	Jutay Dikit	4,342	
Independent	Danilo Ambrocio	188	
Total votes			
Liberal hold			

Mayor Leandro Masikip, Sr. defeated his closest rival, Nico Juanario Patenia.

Pililla Vice Mayoral Elections
Party	Candidate	Votes	%
Nacionalista	Leandro Masikip Sr.	10,337	
Independent	Nico Juanario Patenia	9,923	
UNA	Manuel "Manny" Paz	4,567	
Total votes			
Nacionalista hold			

==== Rodriguez (Montalban) ====
Cecilio Hernandez was re-elected.

Rodriguez (Montalban) Mayoral Elections
Party	Candidate	Votes	%
Liberal	Cecilio "Elyong" Hernandez	88,385	
PBM	Dionisio Ohiman	13,923	
Total votes			
Liberal hold			

Dennis Hernandez won the elections.

Rodriguez (Montalban) Vice Mayoral Elections
Party	Candidate	Votes	%
NPC	Dennis Hernandez	70,078	
Independent	Romeo Grecia	24,995	
Total votes			
NPC hold			

==== San Mateo ====
Vice Mayor Cristina Diaz, wife of Mayor Jose Rafael Diaz, won the elections.

San Mateo Mayoral Elections
Party	Candidate	Votes	%
Liberal	Cristina Diaz	41,564	55.18
PMP	Norberto "Boy" Salen	32,935	43.73
Progressive	Rafael Panfilo, Jr.	820	1.09
Total votes		75,319	100.00
Liberal hold			

Mayor Jose Rafael Diaz, defeated John Patrick Bautista.

San Mateo Vice Mayoral Elections
Party	Candidate	Votes	%
NPC	Jose Rafael Diaz	41,900	57.09
PMP	John Patrick Bautista	31,499	42.91
Total votes		73,399	100.00
NPC hold			

==== Tanay ====
Rex Manuel Tanjuatco, son of Mayor Rafael Tanjuatco, won the elections.

Tanay Mayoral Elections
Party	Candidate	Votes	%
Liberal	Rex Manuel Tanjuatco	30,921	73.74
UNA	Boy Catameo	10,369	24.73
Independent	Leodegario Estrella	640	1.53
Total votes		41,930	100.00
Liberal hold			

Vice Mayor Jaime Vista was re-elected.

Tanay Vice Mayoral Elections
Party	Candidate	Votes	%
Liberal	Jaime "Jimmy" Vista	24,989	63.33
UNA	Joy Tica	14,470	36.67
Total votes		39,459	100.00
Liberal hold			

==== Teresa ====
Mayor Raul Palino was re-elected.

Teresa Mayoral Elections
Party	Candidate	Votes	%
Liberal	Raul Palino	15,581	59.06
UNA	Romualdo Coralde	10,801	40.94
Total votes		26,382	100.00
Liberal hold			

Vice Mayor Jose Jeriel Villegas was re-elected

Teresa Vice Mayoral Election
Party	Candidate	Votes	%
Lakas	Jose Jeriel Villegas	19,438	75.35
Independent	Jason Pahati	6,358	24.65
Total votes		25,796	100.00
Lakas hold			

=== Antipolo ===
Mayor Casimiro "Jun" Ynares III defeated his closest rival Vice Mayor Ronaldo "Puto" Leyva.

Antipolo City Mayoral Elections
Party	Candidate	Votes	%
NPC	Casimiro "Jun" Ynares III	212,662	76.15
Aksyon	Ronaldo "Puto" Leyva	40,497	14.50
Lakas	Puto Leyva	23,233	8.32
Independent	Cherry Savile	1,084	0.39
PBM	Antonio Lagorin	835	0.30
UNA	Juvy Rivas	612	0.22
PMP	Athan Tojon	342	0.12
Total votes		279,265	100.00
NPC hold			

First District Councilor Josefina "Pining" Gatlabayan, wife of former Mayor Angelito Gatlabayan, defeated former Vice Mayor Danilo "Nilo" Leyble in elections.

Antipolo City Vice Mayoral Elections
Party	Candidate	Votes	%
NPC	Josefina "Pining" Gatlabayan	141,279	51.58
Aksyon	Danilo "Nilo" Leyble	118,528	43.27
Independent	Alfred Zapanta	6,196	2.26
Independent	Pocholo Dominic Martinez	2,383	0.87
Independent	Joel Tatad	1,946	0.71
UNA	Vic Nabarte	1,470	0.54
Lakas	Igle Batingal	1,130	0.41
Independent	Aisah Mocsir	674	0.25
PMP	Fat Nabarte	297	0.11
Total votes		273,903	100.00
NPC hold			
