= 2019 Rizal local elections =

Philippine election

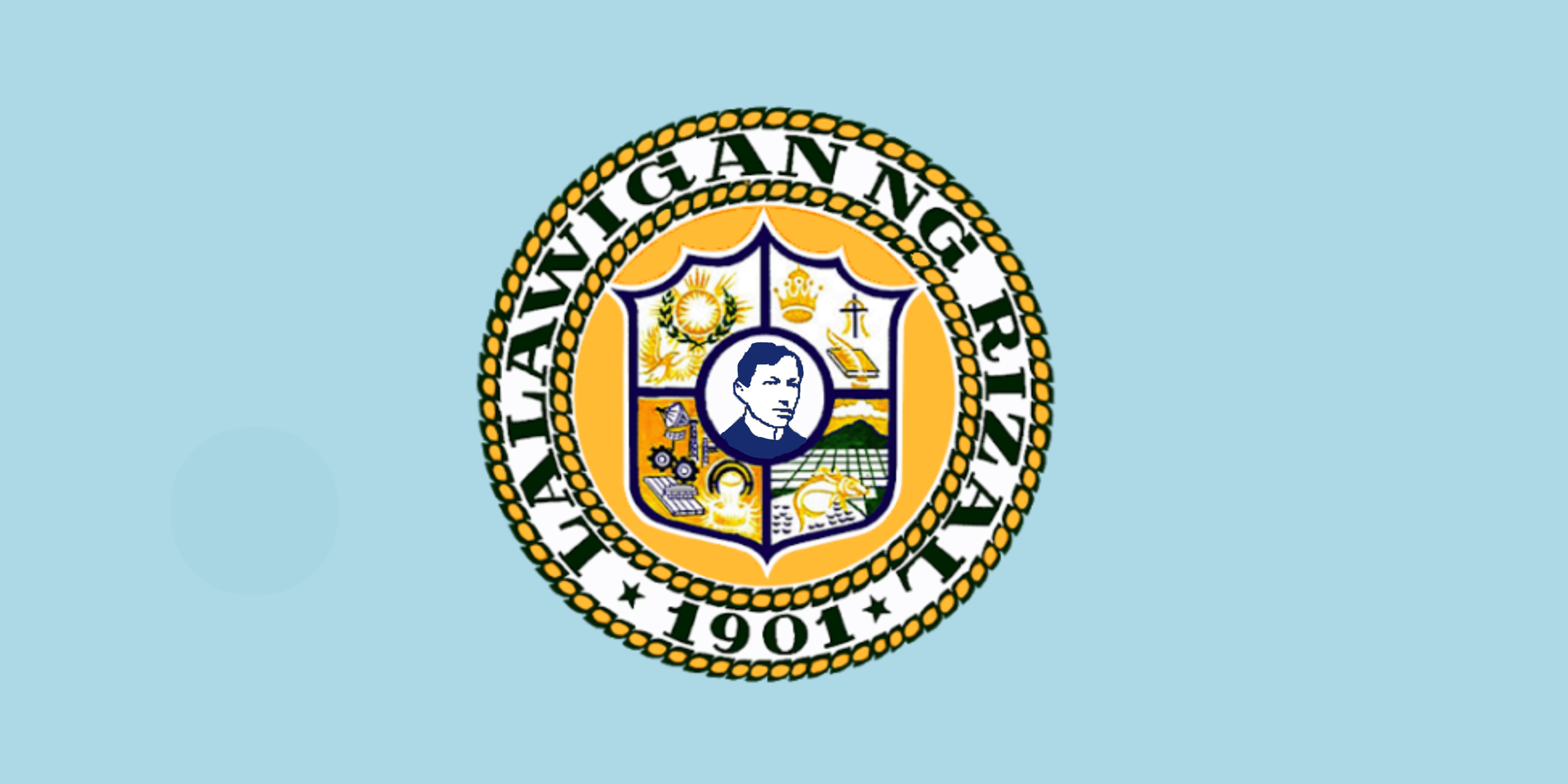
- May 13, 2019
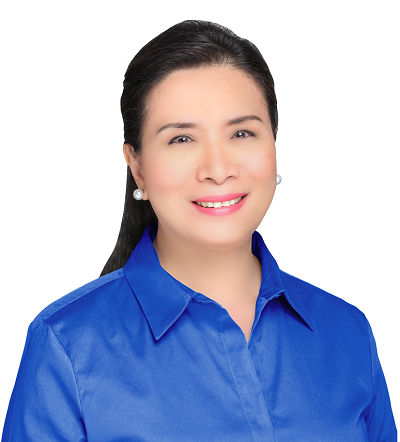
Nominee	Rebecca Ynares	Jose Velasco
Party	NPC	Independent
Running mate	Reynaldo H. San Juan Jr.
Popular vote	811,680	53,640
Nominee	Marc Lester Trinidad	Alex O. Tan
Party	Independent	Independent
Popular vote	34,769	17,856
Governor before election
Rebecca Ynares
NPC
Elected Governor
Rebecca Ynares
NPC

Local elections were held in the Province of Rizal on May 13, 2019, as part of the 2019 general election. Voters selected candidates for all local positions: a municipal/city mayor, vice mayor and town councilors, as well as members of the Sangguniang Panlalawigan, the governor, vice-governor and representatives for the two districts of Rizal.

== Gubernatorial election results ==
Incumbent Governor Rebecca A. Ynares ran for reelection.

Rizal gubernatorial election
Party	Candidate	Votes	%
NPC	Rebecca "Nini" Ynares	811,680	88.42
Independent	Jose Velasco	53,640	5.84
Independent	Marc Lester Trinidad	34,769	3.79
Independent	Alex O. Tan	17,856	1.95
Total votes		917,945	100.00

== Vice gubernatorial election results ==
Vice Governor Reynaldo San Juan, Jr. ran for reelection unopposed.

Rizal vice gubernatorial election
Party	Candidate	Votes	%
PFP	Reynaldo "Junrey" San Juan, Jr.	629,045	100.00
Total votes		629,045	100.00

== Congressional election results ==
=== First District ===
Rep. Michael John "Jack" Duavit was re-elected.

Congressional Elections in Rizal's First District
Party	Candidate	Votes	%
NPC	Michael John "Jack" Duavit	284,871	
PDDS	Catalino Dazo	29,902	
Total votes			

=== Second District ===
Rep. Juan Fidel Felipe Nograles defeated Ma. Lourdes "Maridee" Rodriguez, wife of former Rep. Isidro Rodriguez Jr.

Congressional Elections in Rizal's Second District
Party	Candidate	Votes	%
PDP–Laban	Juan Fidel Felipe Nograles	212,031	
NPC	Ma. Lourdes Rodriguez	138,086	
NUP	Dindo Garciano	10,793	
Total votes			

=== Antipolo ===
==== 1st District ====
Former Rep. Roberto "Robbie" Puno, husband of Rep. Chiqui Roa-Puno, was elected successfully.

Congressional Elections in Antipolo's First District
Party	Candidate	Votes	%
NUP	Roberto "Robbie" Puno	107,140	
Independent	Macario Aggarao	8,056	
Total votes			

==== 2nd District ====
Resureccion Acop, wife of Rep. Romeo "Romy" Acop, elected unopposed.

Congressional Elections in Antipolo's Second District
Party	Candidate	Votes	%
NUP	Resurreccion Acop	127,695	
Total votes			
NUP hold			

== Provincial Board election results ==
All 2 districts of Rizal and all 2 districts of Antipolo elected members of the Rizal Provincial Board.

Party	Popular vote		Seats	
Party	Total	%	Total	%
NPC	996,182	46.99%	6	43%
Liberal	351,841	16.60%	2	14%
PFP	176,955	8.35%	1	7%
NUP	102,837	4.85%	1	7%
Nacionalista	85,838	4.05%	0	0%
Akbayan	71,329	5.39%	0	0%
PMP	40,503	0.49%	0	0%
Independent	294,379	13.89%	0	0%
Total	2,119,864	100%	10	71%

=== First District ===
- Municipalities: Angono, Binangonan, Cainta, Taytay

All board members were re-elected.

Board Member Elections for Rizal's First District
Party	Candidate	Votes	%
NPC	Anthony Jesus "Jestoni" Alarcon	236,728	
NPC	Genato "Dok Ato" Bernardo	191,991	
NPC	Fernando "Jun" Cabitac Jr.	175,562	
NPC	Ross Glenn Gongora	157,029	
Nacionalista	Januver Tiamson	85,838	
Independent	Goldelio Rivera	52,222	
Independent	Reynaldo Manuel	48,461	
Independent	Glenn Acol	34,498	
Total votes			

=== Second District ===
- Municipalities: Baras, Cardona, Jala-Jala, Morong, Pililla, Rodriguez (Montalban), San Mateo, Tanay, Teresa

All board members were re-elected, except for Olivia De Leon who ran and elected as mayor of Morong. She was replaced by former Board Member Emigdio "Dino" Tanjuatco III.

Board Member Elections for Rizal's Second District
Party	Candidate	Votes	%
Liberal	Bartolome "Omie" Rivera Jr.	177,039	
PFP	Rolando "Atto" Rivera	176,955	
Liberal	Emigidio "Dino" Tanjuatco III	174,802	
NPC	Rommel Ayuson	149,940	
PDP–Laban	Amado Del Mundo, Jr.	92,291	
Akbayan	Manolito Dela Paz	71,329	
Independent	Gerry Guillergan	43,250	
PMP	Cirilo Oropesa, Jr.	40,503	
Total votes			

=== Antipolo's 1st District ===
Roberto Andres "Randy" Puno Jr., son of former Rep. Roberto "Robbie" Puno and Rep. Chiqui Roa-Puno was elected unopposed.

Board Member Election for Antipolo's First District
Party	Candidate	Votes	%
NUP	Roberto Andres "Randy" Puno, Jr.	102,837	
Total votes			

=== Antipolo's 2nd District ===
Joel Huertas is term-limited and is running for councilor of the said district. Former councilor Alexander Marquez will run in his stead and will be challenged by Edelberto Coronado.

Board Member Elections for Antipolo's Second District
Party	Candidate	Votes	%
NPC	Alexander Marquez	84,932	
Independent	Edelberto Coronado	23,657	
Total votes			

== City and municipality elections ==
All municipalities and City of Antipolo in Rizal elected mayor and vice-mayor this election. The candidates for mayor and vice mayor with the highest number of votes wins the seat; they are voted separately, therefore, they may be of different parties when elected. Below is the list of mayoralty and vice-mayoralty candidates of each city and municipalities per district.

=== 1st District ===
- Municipalities: Angono, Binangonan, Cainta, Taytay

==== Angono ====
Mayor Gerry Calderon is term limited. His party nominee, his daughter, incumbent Councilor Jeri Mae Calderon defeated Vice Mayor Antonio "Sonny" Rubin.

Angono mayoral election
Party	Candidate	Votes	%
NPC	Jeri Mae Calderon	27,487	
Liberal	Antonio "Sonny" Rubin	16,903	
PDP–Laban	Virtus Gil	4,036	
Majority			
Total votes			

Mayor Gerardo "Gerry" Calderon defeated his brother, former Brgy. Captain Jose "Joey" Calderon.

Angono vice mayoral election
Party	Candidate	Votes	%
NPC	Gerardo "Gerry" Calderon	30,955	
Liberal	Jose "Joey" Calderon	12,337	
PDP–Laban	Rolando Abajar	4,057	
Total votes			

==== Binangonan ====
Mayor Cesar Ynares won unopposed.

Binangonan mayoral election
Party	Candidate	Votes	%
PFP	Cesar Ynares	68,819	
Total votes			

Vice Mayor Cecilio "Boyet" Ynares was re-elected.

Binangonan vice mayoral election
Party	Candidate	Votes	%
NPC	Cecilio "Boyet" Ynares	61,329	
Independent	Manuel Reyes Sr.	15,137	
Total votes			

==== Cainta ====
Mayor Johnielle Keith Nieto defeated Vice Mayor Sofia Velasco

Cainta Mayoral Elections
Party	Candidate	Votes	%
NPC	Johnielle Keith Nieto	109,170	
PMP	Sofia "Pia" Velasco	8,201	
Majority			
Total votes			

Councilor Ace Servillon defeated actor Gary Estrada.

Cainta vice mayoral election
Party	Candidate	Votes	%
NPC	Ace Servillon	81,967	
PMP	Gary Estrada	32,660	
Total votes			

==== Taytay ====
George Ricardo Gacula is the incumbent.

Taytay mayoral election
Party	Candidate	Votes	%
Nacionalista	George Ricardo Gacula	61,468	
NPC	Carlito "Bonoy" Gonzaga	42,125	
PFP	Aser Ram	886	
Total votes			

Vice Mayor Carlito Gonzaga is running for mayor. His party's nominee is Jan Victor Cabitac.

Taytay vice mayoral election
Party	Candidate	Votes	%
Nacionalista	Michell Bermudo	53,917	
NPC	Jan Victor Cabitac	45,606	
PFP	Rommel Batac	1,168	
Total votes			

=== 2nd District ===
- Municipalities: Baras, Cardona, Jala-Jala, Morong, Pililla, Rodriguez (Montalban), San Mateo, Tanay, Teresa

==== Baras ====
Katherine Robles is the incumbent.

Baras mayoral election
Party	Candidate	Votes	%
NPC	Katherine Robles	17,020	
PDP–Laban	Roberto Ferrera	2,117	
NUP	Bettina Garciano	1,578	
KDP	Crisostomo Dilidili	273	
Total votes			

Willfredo Robles is the incumbent.

Baras vice mayoral election
Party	Candidate	Votes	%
NPC	Willfredo Robles	15,716	
Independent	Dandy Coronel	2,371	
PDP–Laban	Waynefred Yuson	1,471	
Total votes			

==== Cardona ====
Cardona mayoral election
Party	Candidate	Votes	%
Liberal	Teodulo Campo	11,096	
NPC	Gil San Juan	9,921	
Total votes			

Cardona vice mayoral election
Party	Candidate	Votes	%
PDP–Laban	Gil Pandac	12,505	
Liberal	Jonathan Adriano	6,790	
Total votes			

==== Jala-Jala ====
Jala-Jala mayoral election
Party	Candidate	Votes	%
NPC	Elmer Pillas	9,738	
PDP–Laban	Narciso Villaran	6,196	
Total votes			

Jala-Jala vice mayoral election
Party	Candidate	Votes	%
Liberal	Jolet Delos Santos	11,613	
Total votes			

==== Morong ====
Morong mayoral election
Party	Candidate	Votes	%
NPC	Olivia De Leon	14,187	
UNA	Armando San Juan	13,788	
Total votes			

Morong vice mayoral election
Party	Candidate	Votes	%
PDP–Laban	Julian De Ungria	14,681	
UNA	Ricardo Halina	12,193	
Total votes			

==== Pililla ====
Pililla mayoral election
Party	Candidate	Votes	%
PDP–Laban	Dan Masinsin	18,061	
Nacionalista	Leandro Masikip, Sr.	10,389	
PFP	Joselito Aquino	471	
Total votes			

Pililla vice mayoral election
Party	Candidate	Votes	%
PDP–Laban	Rafael Carpio	12,423	
Nacionalista	Nico Patenia	12,038	
KDP	Ronnie Bias	2,169	
PFP	Erwin Castelo	814	
Total votes			

==== Rodriguez (Montalban) ====
Cecilio Hernandez is term-limited and is running for vice mayor.

Rodriguez (Montalban) mayoral election
Party	Candidate	Votes	%
NPC	Dennis Hernandez	40,527	
PDP–Laban	Romeo Grecia	38,524	
Independent	Felicisimo Salvador, Jr.	26,201	
Independent	Herminio Balinas, Sr.	5,183	
Independent	Alex Ignacio	2,696	
Total votes			

Rodriguez (Montalban) vice mayoral election
Party	Candidate	Votes	%
PDP–Laban	Anecito Lirazan	48,632	
NPC	Cecilio Hernandez	40,214	
Total votes			

==== San Mateo ====
Cristina Diaz is the incumbent.

San Mateo mayoral election
Party	Candidate	Votes	%
PDP–Laban	Cristina Diaz	60,571	
Independent	Wilfredo Selga	12,693	
Total votes			

San Mateo vice mayoral election
Party	Candidate	Votes	%
NPC	Jose Rafael Diaz	63,910	
Total votes			

==== Tanay ====
Tanay mayoral election
Party	Candidate	Votes	%
PDP–Laban	Rex Manuel Tanjuatco	32,820	
KBL	Fausto Briones	3,878	
Independent	Leodegario Estrella	3,050	
Total votes			

Tanay vice mayoral election
Party	Candidate	Votes	%
PDP–Laban	Rafael Tanjuatco	31,798	
KBL	Ciceron Navarro	3,956	
Independent	Melchor Blaza	2,114	
Total votes			

==== Teresa ====
Raul Palino is the incumbent.

Teresa mayoral election
Party	Candidate	Votes	%
PDP–Laban	Raul Palino	16,671	
PFP	Romualdo Coralde	11,980	
Total votes			

Teresa Vice Mayoral Election
Party	Candidate	Votes	%
PDP–Laban	Jose Jeriel Villegas	21,930	
NPC	Dan Cruz	5,965	
Total votes			

=== Antipolo ===
Casimiro "Jun" Ynares III is not running. His wife Andrea is his party's nominee and is running unopposed.

Antipolo mayoral election
Party	Candidate	Votes	%
NPC	Andrea Bautista-Ynares	235,548	100%
Total votes		235,548	100%

Antipolo vice mayoral election
Party	Candidate	Votes	%
NPC	Josefina Gatlabayan	227,054	100%
Total votes		227,054	100%
