= Jack Duavit =

Filipino politician (born 1970)

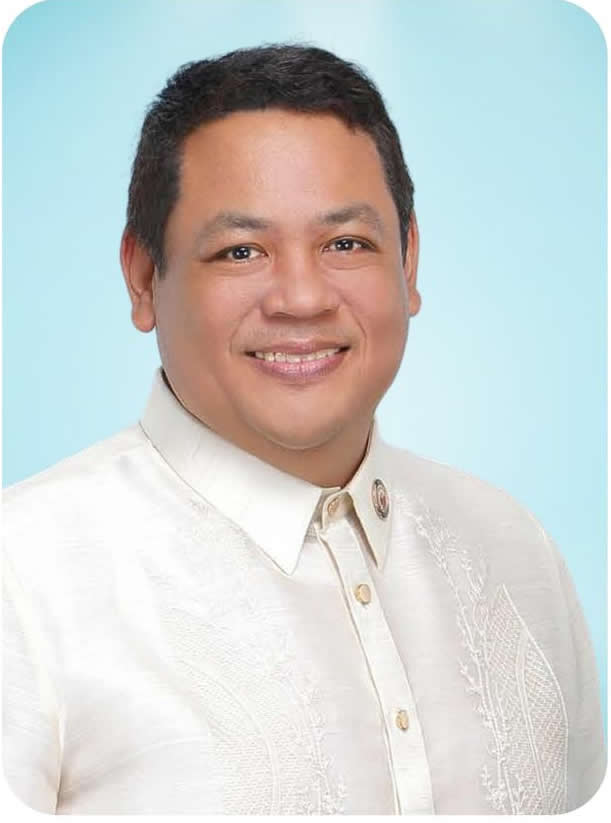
- Official portrait, 2022

Member of the Philippine House of Representatives from Rizal's 1st District
- In office June 30, 2016 – June 30, 2025
- Preceded by: Joel Duavit
- Succeeded by: Mia Ynares
- In office June 30, 2001 – June 30, 2010
- Preceded by: Gilberto Duavit Sr.
- Succeeded by: Joel Duavit

Personal details
- Born: Michael John Roy Duavit; February 20, 1970 (age 56)
- Party: NPC (2001–present)
- Parents: Gilberto Duavit Sr. (father); Vilma Roy-Duavit (mother)
- Relatives: Gilberto Duavit Jr. (brother); Karl Roy (cousin)
- Education: De La Salle University
- Occupation: Politician

Michael John "Jack" Roy Duavit (born February 20, 1970) is a Filipino politician, businessman and former audio engineer who served as the representative of Rizal's 1st congressional district from 2016 to 2025, and previously from 2001 to 2010. He has served as a party leader of the Nationalist People's Coalition (NPC) since the 2000s. Duavit was elected to the board of directors at GMA Network in 2015.

== Early life ==
Duavit was born on February 20, 1970. He is the youngest son of former Rizal 1st District representative Gilberto Duavit Sr. and Vilma Roy. He is also the brother of former Rizal 1st District representative Joel Duavit, GMA Network president and CEO Gilberto Duavit Jr., and Judith Duavit-Vasquez. Duavit graduated from his primary education from Xavier School, and his secondary education from the Ateneo de Manila.

In De La Salle University, he earned his Bachelor of Science and Commerce major in Marketing Management. He also held a Recording Arts Engineering Degree at Full Sail Center for the Recording Arts Management Information Technology Program.

== Business career ==
In his early career, he was the chairman, president and CEO of MRD Holdings & Investments. He was also the chairman and managing director of Puresound Trading, Inc.

Duavit managed as director for several private institutions, such as GMA Network Inc., Vigil Inc., Citynet Television, Inc., Rosmar Holdings, Inc. GMA New Media, Inc., and Social Investments Fund at Group Management & Development, Inc. Duavit was also the trustee of GMA Foundation, Inc., and Guronasyon Foundation, Inc.

== Political career ==
A native of Binangonan, Rizal, Duavit ran in the 2001 local elections for the position of district representative for the 1st District of Rizal under the Nationalist People's Coalition and eventually won the seat. During his first full term, he served as the vice chairman of the House Committee on Economic Affairs, House Committee on Appropriations, and House Committee on Trade and Industry.

While on office, he received awards such as the "Youngest Delegate to represent a Major Political Party (NPC) from the First Philippine Political Parties Conference" and being voted as one of the "Top 20 New Congressman".

In the 2016 local elections, he again ran for the position of district representative for the 1st District of Rizal after being term-limited. Duavit managed to beat former Philippine Airlines president Avelino Zapanta and PDP-Laban candidate Willfrido Naval.

In the 2019 local elections, he ran for his fifth term, going against PDDS candidate Catalino Dazo. He won a landslide victory against him.

In 2020, after Alan Peter Cayetano lost the speakership, he was replaced by Jack Duavit as the caretaker of the first congressional district of Camarines Sur. Duavit took over the post left by the late Camarines Sur congresswoman Marissa Andaya who died of cancer in July 2020.

In 2021, Duavit was asked by the Nationalist People's Coalition to reach out to his party mates, concerning that the cha-cha initiative is only limited to the economic provisions of the Constitution. Duavit said that the limitation in owning mass media under cha-cha will be removed and told that the limitations were outdated for the modern world. Duavit also added that cha-cha will also allow foreigners to own public utility companies. Though Duavit clarified that it is not allowed to completely remove the restrictive economic provisions under the constitution, that version of cha-cha will only insert the quote “unless otherwise provided by law” on the economic provisions.

In the 2022 local elections, he ran for his sixth and final term. He is one of the only two candidates that are unopposed for a congressional seat in the whole province. After the 2022 elections, Duavit and his fellow party members supported the speakership of Martin Romualdez.

In his second full term, Duavit is one of the vice chairmen of the House Committee on Appropriations and a member of the Ways and Means, Trade and Industry, Basic Education, Economic Affairs, Banks and Financial Intermediaries, Information and Communications Technology, Public Works and Highways and Southern Tagalog Development house committees.

On February 5, 2025, Duavit was among the 12 NPC members who did not sign the impeachment complaint against vice president Sara Duterte.

== Electoral history ==
Electoral history of Jack Duavit
Year	Office	Party	Votes received				Result
Year	Office	Party	Total	%	P.	Swing	Result
2001	District Representative of Rizal's 1st District	NPC	103,117	61.00%	1st	—N/a	Won
2004	District Representative of Rizal's 1st District	NPC	140,433	59.05%	1st	-1.95	Won
2007	District Representative of Rizal's 1st District	NPC	174,744	86.00%	1st	+26.95	Won
2016	District Representative of Rizal's 1st District	NPC	245,791	82.63%	1st	+2.63	Won
2019	District Representative of Rizal's 1st District	NPC	284,871	90.50%	1st	+7.87	Won
2022	District Representative of Rizal's 1st District	NPC	308,707	100.00%	1st	+9.50	Unopposed

Political offices
Preceded by Gilberto Duavit Sr.	Representative of Rizal's 1st congressional district 2001–2010	Succeeded by Joel Duavit
Preceded by Joel Duavit	Representative of Rizal's 1st congressional district 2016–2025	Succeeded by Mia Ynares
