= Mon Ilagan =

Assistant Secretary of DOTR

Executive Director of OTC and Assistant Secretary and Spokesperson of DOTR
- Incumbent
- Assumed office March 31, 2025

10th Mayor of Cainta, Rizal
- In office June 30, 2004 – June 30, 2013
- Vice Mayor: Julio Narag (2004–2007); Arturo Sicat (2007–2013)
- Preceded by: Nicanor Cruz Felix
- Succeeded by: Johnielle Keith Nieto

Personal details
- Born: Ramon Abulon Ilagan; 12 May 1960 (age 66) Antipolo City, Rizal, Philippines
- Party: PFP
- Other political affiliations: NPC (2004–2015); UNA (2016)
- Spouse: Bernarda "Veron" Ilagan
- Children: Ma. Anita Bernice Ilagan; Ma. Charis Kay Ilagan; Jonah Paula Ilagan; Dominique Frances Ilagan
- Education: University of Santo Tomas; Ateneo de Manila
- Occupation: Government Employee
- Profession: Government Employee, Executive Director of Office of the Transportation Cooperatives (OTC), Assistant Secretary and Spokesperson of Department of Transportation

Ramon Abulon Ilagan (born May 12, 1960) is a Filipino broadcast journalist, politician who served as the municipal mayor of Cainta from 2004 to 2013. He is the former overall spokesperson for United Nationalist Alliance, for the party itself and for former Vice President Jejomar Binay's 2016 presidential campaign.

He is recently appointed in the Department of Transportation, as Assistant Secretary and Executive Director of the Office of Transportation Cooperatives an attached agency of DOTr. OTC plays a major role in the implementation of the Public Transport Modernization Program (PTMP) under the administration of President Bongbong Marcos.

== Early life ==
Ilagan's mother was a government hospital employee and his father was a World War II veteran. Ilagan grew up in Barangay Tatalon, Quezon City. After finishing public schooling at Tatalon Elementary School and Carlos Albert High School, he spent time as a choir member of the National Shrine of Our Lady of the Most Holy Rosary. He participated in church activities at the Sto. Domingo Parish, following the vows of poverty, chastity and obedience. It was during this time when Fr. Sonny Ramirez, OP, asked Ilagan to work for him at Radio Veritas.

== Career ==
Under the guidance and pastoral care of Fr. Ramirez, Mon Ilagan began his career in broadcasting while pursuing his college degree in Communication Arts at the University of Santo Tomas. He spent 25 years in the media industry, which turned out to be successful and was highlighted by prestigious awards such as the 1997 Reporter of the Year, the 2001 and 2003 Star Awards Best Morning Show Host for "Alas Singko Y Medya" and "Magandang Umaga, Pilipinas". He also taught as a professor at the ABS-CBN Center for Communication Arts.

Last March 31, 2025, he was appointed by President Bongbong Marcos as Executive Director of the Office of Transportation Cooperatives (OTC) and DOTr Spokesperson.

== Political life ==
Mayor Ilagan faced public criticism over flood-prevention measures, after the damage caused by Typhoon Ketsana to the Cainta municipality on 27 September 2009.

As a public servant, Ilagan has received numerous awards, including a special citation from the United Nations for his program in support of "Stand Up and Take Action Against Poverty," the UST Arts and Letters Government Service Award in 2010, the 2008 CEO Excel Award (given by the International Association of Business Communicators), and the 2006 Most Supportive LGU Executive, which was awarded by the Department of Health.

During his broadcasting years, Ilagan received a scholarship to the British Broadcasting Company in London as part of the Rotary Club International Foundation's Groups Study Exchange Program. He also attended local and international conferences and workshops to pursue the latest and best practices in disaster risk management and reduction. At present, he is pursuing a master's degree in Public Management at the Ateneo de Manila University School of Government.

== Personal life ==
Ilagan credits his success to the providential guidance of his Christian God and the support he receives from his wife, Veron, and his four children, Ma. Anita Bernice, Ma. Charis Kay, Jonah Paula and Dominique Frances.
