= Rebecca Ynares =

Filipino politician

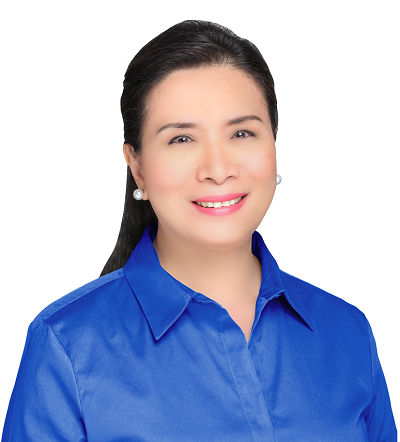

19th & 22nd Governor of Rizal
- In office June 30, 2013 – June 30, 2022
- Vice Governor: Frisco San Juan Jr. (2013–2016); Reynaldo San Juan Jr. (2016–2022)
- Preceded by: Casimiro Ynares III
- Succeeded by: Nina Ynares
- In office June 30, 2001 – June 30, 2004
- Vice Governor: Teodoro O'Hara (2001–2002); Jovita Rodriguez (2002–2004)
- Preceded by: Casimiro Ynares Jr.
- Succeeded by: Casimiro Ynares Jr.

Director of the United Coconut Planters Bank
- In office October 10, 1998 – June 30, 2001

Personal details
- Born: Rebecca Alcantara; September 26, 1949 (age 77) Taytay, Rizal, Philippines
- Party: NPC (2001–present)
- Spouse: Casimiro Ynares Jr.
- Children: 3 (Nina, Casimiro III, and Mia)
- Education: St. Paul University Manila (BS)

Rebecca "Nini" Alcantara Ynares (born September 26, 1949) is a Filipina politician from the province of Rizal, Philippines who last served as governor of the province from 2001 to 2004 and again from 2013 to 2022. She also served as president of Octagon Realty & Development Corporation, JNM Realty & Development Corporation, and Mar-vi Enterprise, Inc. and the director of United Coconut Planters Bank (UCPB) from 1998 to 2001. During her first term as governor, she was concurrently a director of Laguna Lake Development Authority from 2001 to 2004 and treasurer of the League of Provinces of the Philippines. She was preceded as governor by her son Casimiro A. Ynares III and succeeded by her daughter Nina Ynares-Chiongbian.

On March 25, 2020, Ynares tested positive for COVID-19.

== Electoral history ==
Electoral history of Rebecca Ynares
Year	Office	Party	Votes received				Result
Year	Office	Party	Total	%	P.	Swing	Result
2001	Governor of Rizal	NPC	299,969	63.36%	1st	—N/a	Won
2013	Governor of Rizal	NPC	502,850	77.83%	1st	+14.47	Won
2016	Governor of Rizal	NPC	767,909	87.35%	1st	+9.52	Won
2019	Governor of Rizal	NPC	811,680	88.42%	1st	+1.07	Won

Political offices
Preceded by Casimiro Ynares III	Governor of Rizal; 2013–2022	Succeeded by Nina Ynares
Preceded by Casimiro Ynares Jr.	Governor of Rizal; 2001–2004	Succeeded by Casimiro Ynares Jr.
