= Kit Nieto =

Philippine politician (born 1969)

The Honorable Kit Nieto
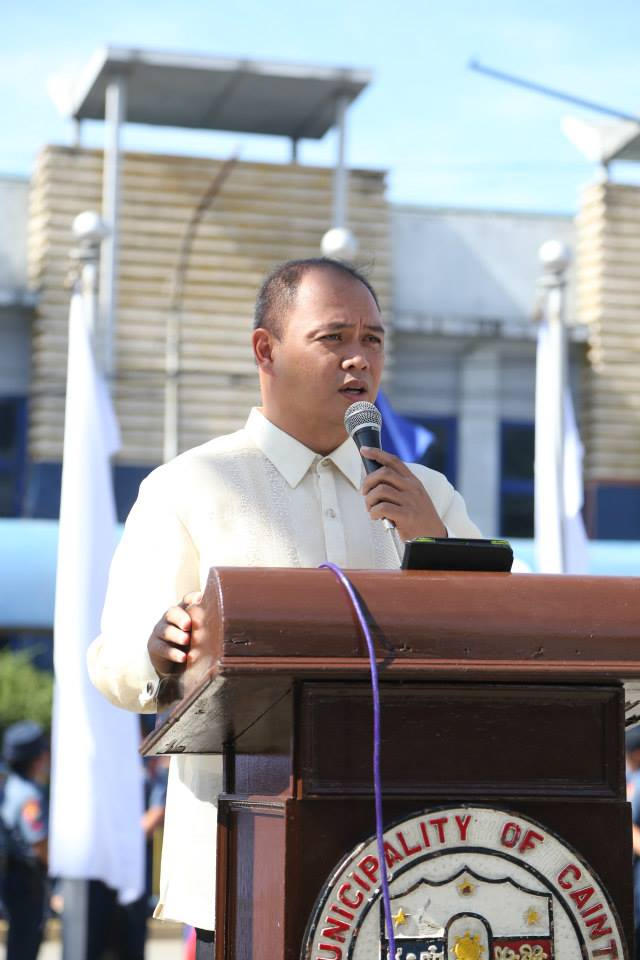

Mayor of Cainta
- Incumbent
- Assumed office June 30, 2025
- Vice Mayor: Ace Servillon
- Preceded by: Maria Elenita Nieto
- In office June 30, 2013 – June 30, 2022
- Vice Mayor: Sofia Velasco (2013–2019); Ace Servillon (2019–2022)
- Preceded by: Mon Ilagan
- Succeeded by: Maria Elenita Nieto

Municipal Administrator of Cainta
- In office July 2022 – October 2, 2024
- Mayor: Maria Elenita Nieto

Personal details
- Born: Johnielle Keith Pasion Nieto; January 31, 1969 (age 57) Makati, Rizal, Philippines
- Party: NPC (2015–present)
- Other political affiliations: UNA (2012–2015)
- Spouse: Maria Elenita Nieto
- Children: 1
- Relatives: Jan Nieto (brother)
- Education: Ateneo de Manila University (A.B., LL.B.)

Johnielle Keith "Kit" Pasion Nieto (born January 31, 1969) is a Filipino lawyer and politician who has served as the mayor of Cainta, Rizal since 2025, and previously from 2013 to 2022. Before his comeback as mayor, he served as the municipal administrator of Cainta from 2022 to 2024 under the administration of his wife, former mayor Maria Elenita "Ellen" Nieto.

== Early life and career ==
Johnielle Keith Nieto was born on January 31, 1969, to medical doctors Rolando Nieto and Ethelyn Pasion with five siblings. His mother was also an undersecretary of the Department of Health, while his brother Jan is a recording artist who competed on Philippine Idol. His other brother Jet was a member of the 1987 and 1988 Ateneo Blue Eagles championship teams.

Nieto graduated from the Ateneo de Manila University with a Bachelor of Arts degree in political science. He attended the Ateneo School of Law for his law degree and was admitted to the bar on March 15, 1994.

== Political career ==
Nieto ran for mayor during 2013 elections under United Nationalist Alliance and was proclaimed winner, beating Veron Ilagan, wife of former Mayor Mon Ilagan. He ran again during 2016 elections and 2019 elections under Nationalist People's Coalition and won landslide victories, beating incumbent vice-mayor Sofia Velasco in the latter one. He became term limited in 2022 and was succeeded by his wife Maria Elenita "Ellen" Nieto.

From 2022 to 2024, under the mayorship of his wife, Nieto served as the municipal administrator of Cainta. He left the position to run for mayor in 2025, which he won unopposed.

== Personal life ==
Nieto is married to fellow lawyer Maria Elenita "Ellen" Nieto, with whom he has one son named Jacob.

Nieto is the uncle and godfather of professional basketball players, Matt and Mike Nieto, who both played for the Ateneo Blue Eagles until 2019.

In January 2026, Nieto took a medical leave as the mayor of Cainta after being hospitalized for severe chest pains. An angiogram a revealed multiple blockages in his major arteries, leading him to undergo a series of heart procedures, including angioplasties. Though he briefly returned to his mayoral duties in February 2026, Nieto announced another medical leave on September 19, 2026, for a quadruple heart bypass operation after experiencing recurring breathing difficulties and numbness.
