= Teresa, Rizal =

Municipality in Rizal, Philippines

Teresa
- Municipality
- Municipality of Teresa
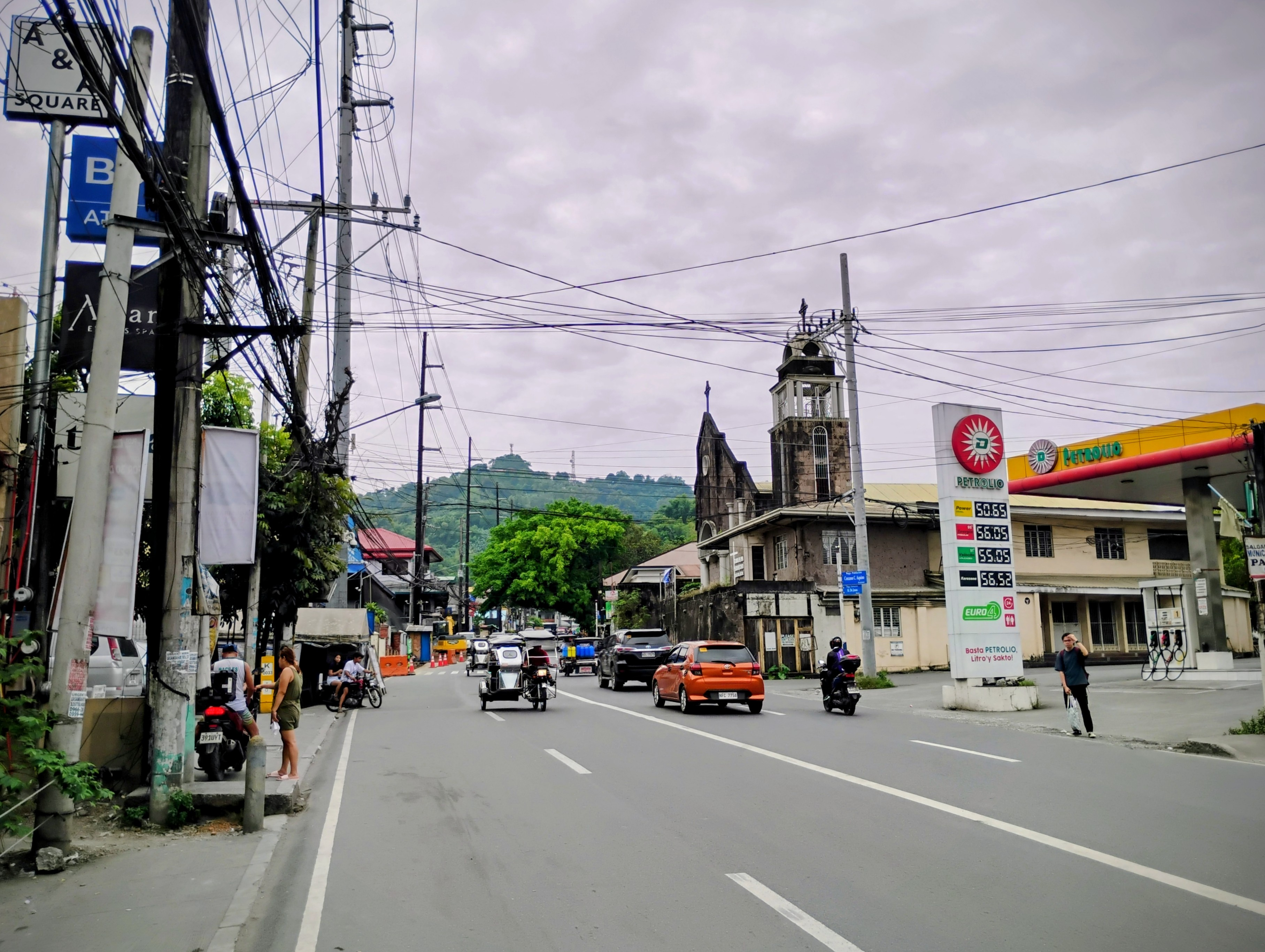
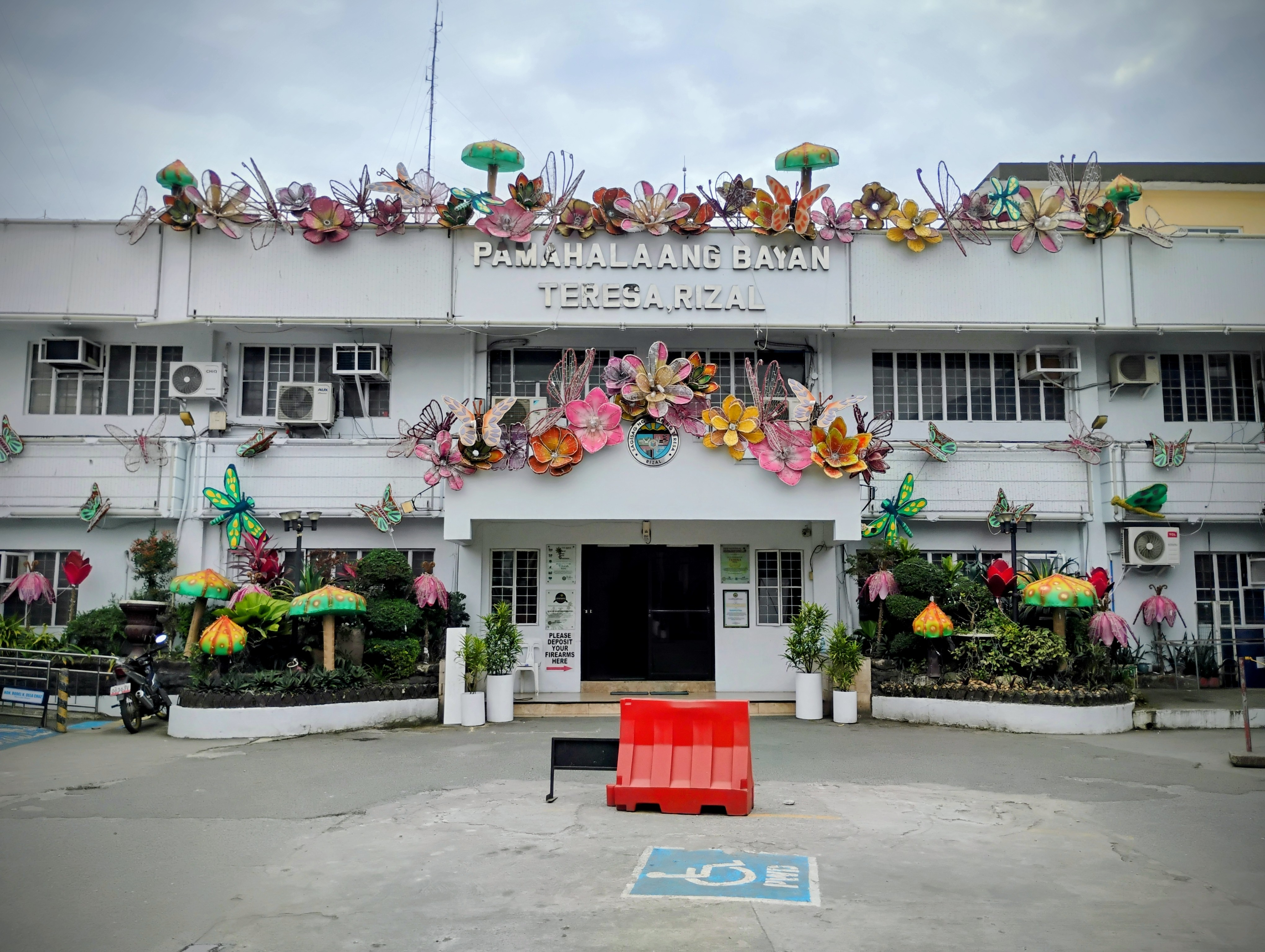
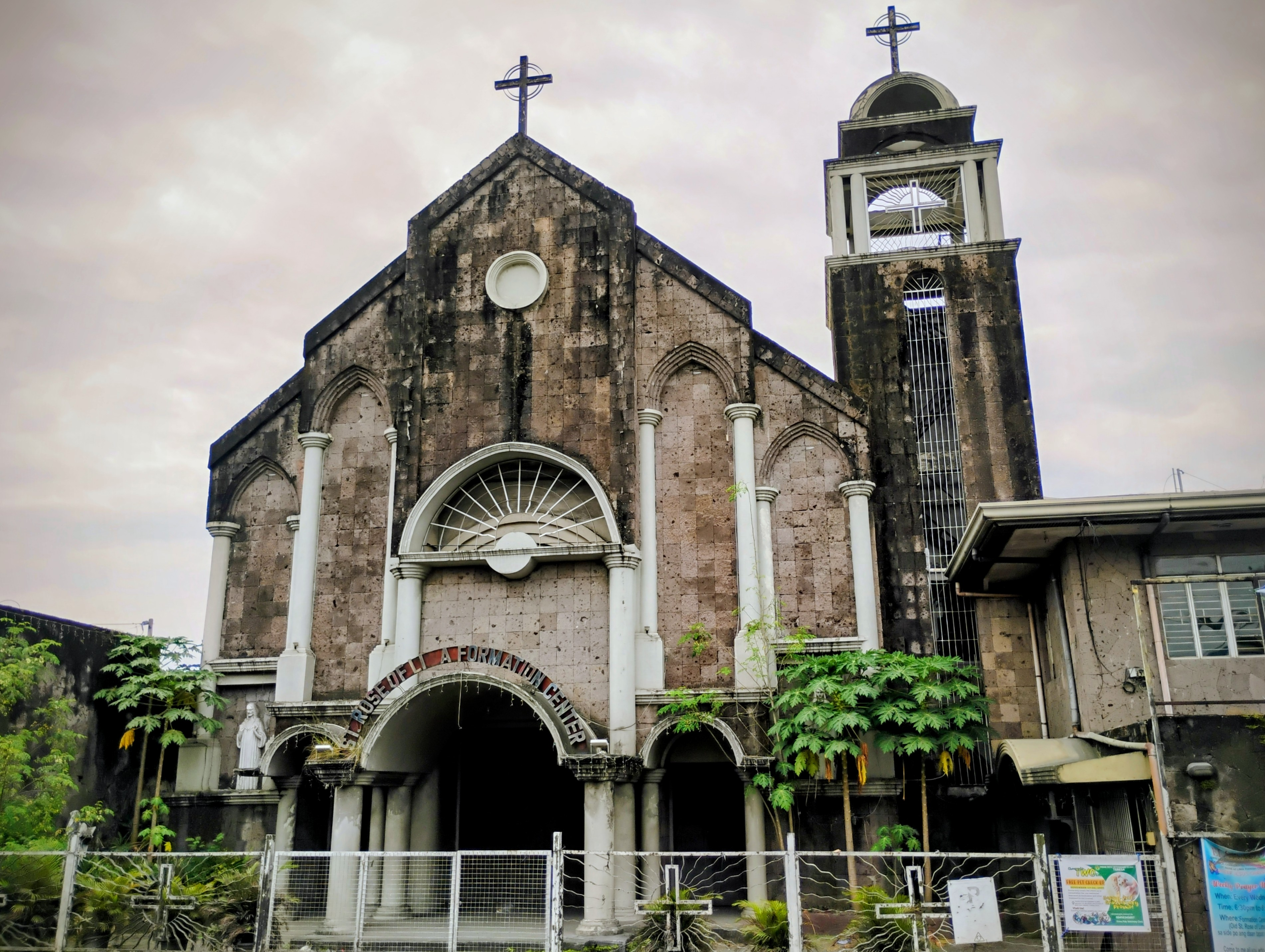
- Teresa Town Proper Teresa Municipal Hall Saint Rose of Lima Formation Center

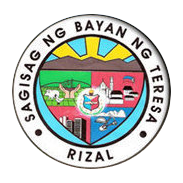
- Seal

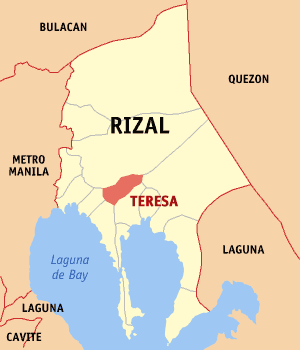
- Map of Rizal with Teresa highlighted
- Interactive map of Teresa
- Location within the Philippines
- Coordinates: 14°33′31″N 121°12′30″E
- Country: Philippines
- Region: Calabarzon
- Province: Rizal
- District: 2nd district
- Founded: 1853
- Annexation to Antipolo: October 12, 1903
- Chartered: January 1, 1919
- Named for: Doña Teresa Candelaria
- Barangays: 9 (see Barangays)

Government
  - Type: Sangguniang Bayan
  - Mayor: Rodel N. Dela Cruz
  - Vice Mayor: Freddie F. Bonifacio
  - Representative: Emigdio P. Tanjuatco III
  - Municipal Council: Members: Anthony S. Damaso; Fernand N. Dela Cruz; Minerva S. Marcelino; John Gregor S. Pascual; Victorius Joshua T. San Jose; Joker A. Santos; Aurelio G. Selibio Jr.; Juvith E. Sto. Tomas
  - Electorate: 46,906 voters (2025)

Area
  - Total: 18.61 km^{2} (7.19 sq mi)
- Elevation: 116 m (381 ft)
- Highest elevation: 304 m (997 ft)
- Lowest elevation: 2 m (6.6 ft)

Population (2024 census)
  - Total: 67,454
  - Density: 3,625/km^{2} (9,388/sq mi)
  - Households: 14,731

Economy
  - Income class: 1st municipal income class
  - Poverty incidence: 8.54% (2023)
  - Revenue: ₱ 390.1 million (2024)
  - Assets: ₱ 666.7 million (2024)
  - Expenditure: ₱ 382.6 million (2024)
  - Liabilities: ₱ 197.5 million (2024)

Service provider
  - Electricity: Manila Electric Company (Meralco)
- Time zone: UTC+8 (PST)
- ZIP code: 1880
- PSGC: 0405814000
- IDD : area code: +63 (0)2
- Native languages: Tagalog
- Website: teresarizal.gov.ph

Teresa, officially the Municipality of Teresa (Tagalog: Bayan ng Teresa), is a municipality in the province of Rizal, Philippines. According to the 2024 census, it has a population of 67,454 people.

The town is primarily known for the nearby mountain resorts, Villa Sampaguita Resort and Real Cove Resort (Formerly Sunrise Resort, Sunset Resort, and Terra Villa Resort).

== History ==
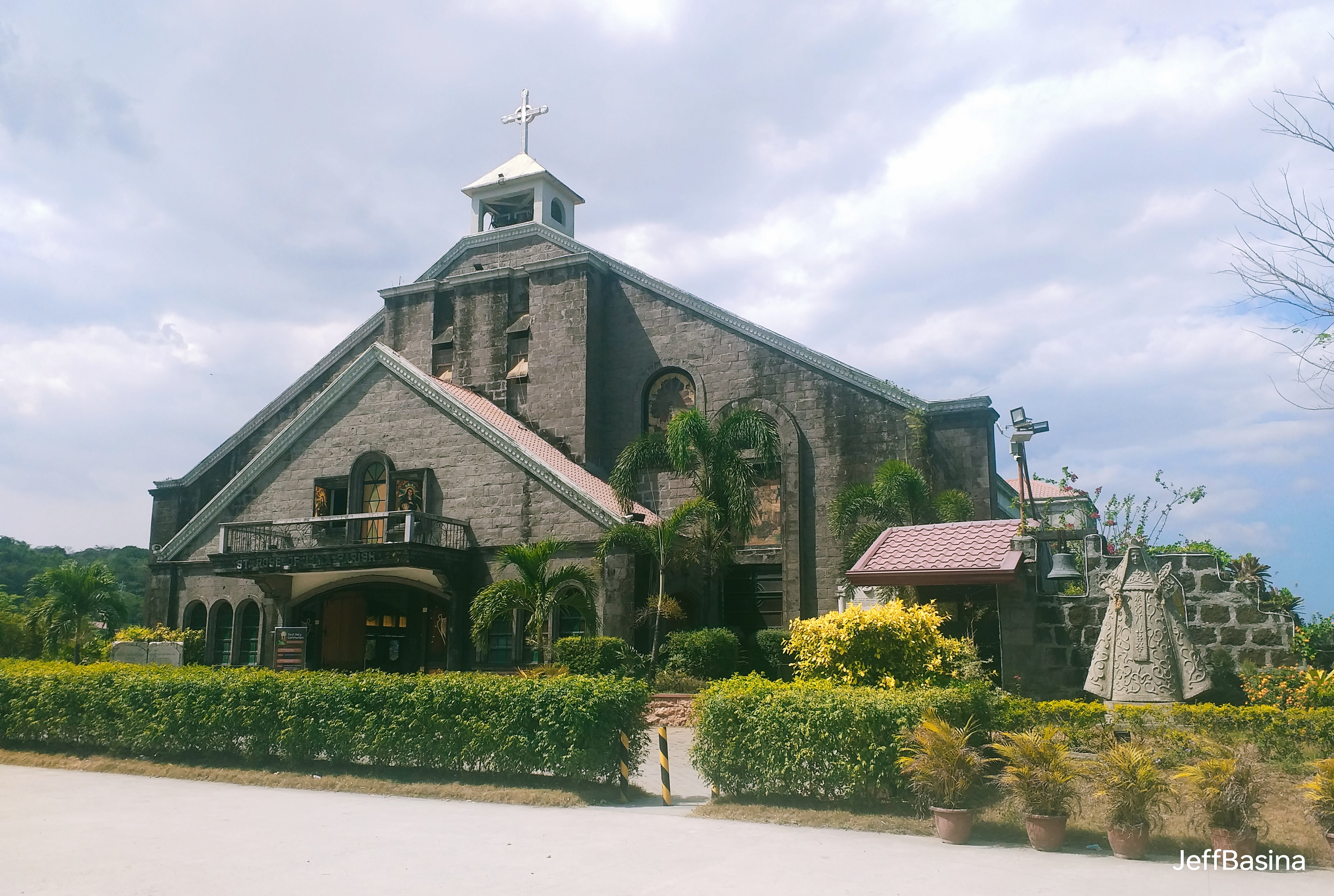
The newly built church dedicated to its patron saint, Saint Rose of Lima.

Teresa was first named "Oroquieta" and was a barrio of the Municipality of Morong. As a non-independent town its name was changed to "Santa Rosa" in honor of the town's patron saint, St. Rose of Lima. Against the will of its people, Santa Rosa was annexed to Antipolo, which led to animosity between the two towns. Most of the residents preferred to be under jurisdiction of Morong.

Unstable conditions led militant leaders such as Messra. San Esteban, Santo Domingo, Pio Piriquiquit Santos, Raymundo Francisco, Mariano Celo Francisco, Diego P. Cruz, Santiago P. Cruz, Sabino de Ramos, Platon Gonzales, Brigido Capli Cruz, Lorenzo Capli Cruz, Saturnino Francisco, and Francisco Natividad to clamor for independence. In 1877, the Spanish lawyer Don Mariano Rodriguez Candelaria assisted the people in appealing to the Spanish Governor-General for separate ownership. The appeal was given preferential attention, and Santa Rosa was later declared an independent town. In 1900, the people agreed to change the name from Santa Rosa to "Teresa" in honor of the Spanish lawyer's mother, Doña Teresa Candelaria.

In 1903, when rebellion broke out, Teresa was again annexed to the Municipality of Antipolo. In 1917, the able men of the town again moved for independence with the help of the Rizal Governor Eulogio Rodriguez, Sr. This move, however, failed due to political reasons.

With the help extended by Senator Rafael Palma, the independence of Teresa was approved and declared by the Governor-General Charles E. Yeater on January 1, 1919, through Executive Order No. 57 (signed December 16, 1918). Roberto de Jesus was appointed as the first "Municipal President" (known as Mayor today). Functioning as a town, Teresa comprised three barrios at the time: May-Iba, Pantay, and San Roque.

After three years of independence, the town acquired a municipal building on November 8, 1921, which was called Presedencia. Paulino de la Rosa was the second Municipal President of Teresa, Rizal. During his term the elementary school building (located in Dalig) was inaugurated. His portrait hangs proudly as the first in the grand entrance of the municipal building in Teresa, Rizal.

== Geography ==
Teresa is situated in the slopes of the Sierra Madre Mountains and is bordered on four corners by Antipolo on the north, Angono on the west, Tanay, on the east, and Morong, on the south. The town is passed by motorists bounded for the more inland towns of Morong, Baras, Tanay, Pililla, and Laguna and Quezon provinces.

Contrary to some articles, Teresa is actually a valley surrounded by mountains. The town center is located almost at the center of the valley. In an aerial view of Teresa, one would notice the previously vast expanse of agricultural land bordered by marble-rich mountains.

=== Barangays ===
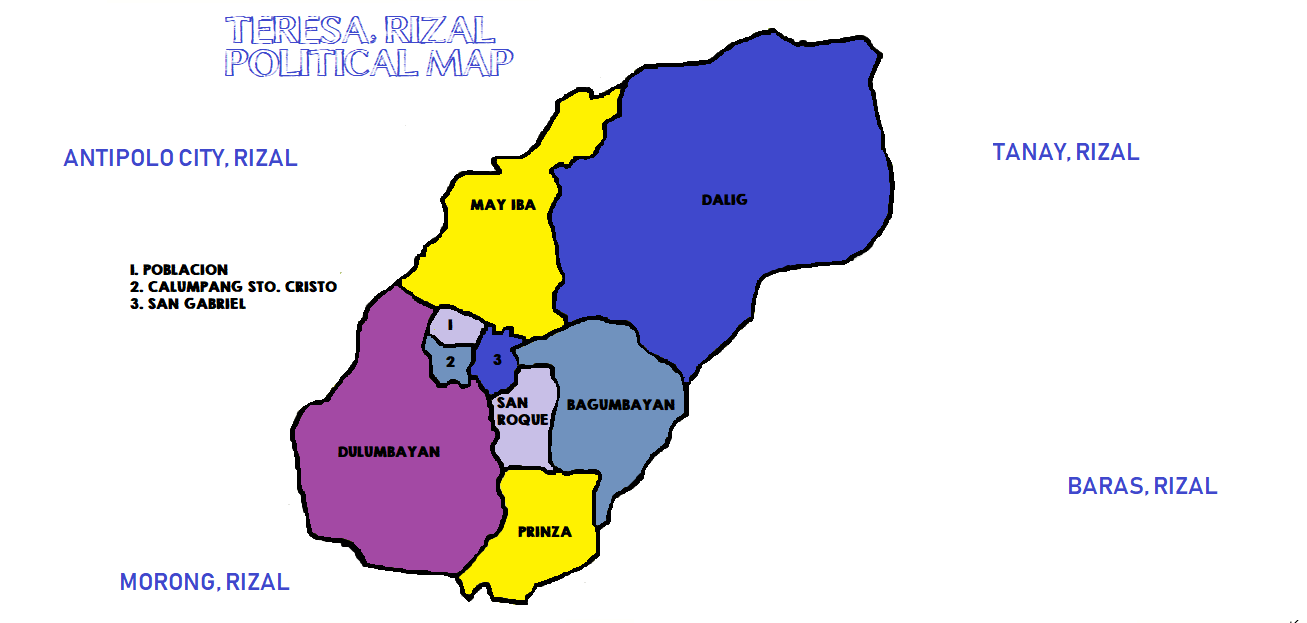
The Political Map of Teresa, Rizal (Subject to the correction by Teresa LGU). It shows the Barangays in Teresa, Rizal and the adjacent Municipalities/cities in it.

Teresa is politically subdivided into 9 barangays, as indicated below. Each barangay consists of puroks and some have sitios.

Barangay	Population (2024)	Area
Bagumbayan	14,732	
Dalig	15,146	
Dulumbayan	10,027	
May-Iba	7,134	
Poblacion	1,100	
Prinza	7,790	
San Gabriel	6,101	
San Roque	4,097	
Calumpang Santo Cristo	1,327	
Total	67,454	

As of the year 2010, there was a proposal to name the eastern section of the municipality as a 10th barangay (the area from the Marcos Highway towards General Nakar in Quezon Province). However, the area is part of the disputed political claim among the municipalities of Morong, Teresa, Baras, and Tanay.

=== Land use ===
Land uses (in hectares): Commercial (1.92), Residential (104.32), Agricultural (1183.35), Protected areas (13,952.41), Industrial / Ecozone (710.69), Institutional (112.28), and Special / Other uses (123.03).

=== Climate ===
Climate data for Teresa, Rizal
Month	Jan	Feb	Mar	Apr	May	Jun	Jul	Aug	Sep	Oct	Nov	Dec	Year
Mean daily maximum °C (°F)	26 (79)	27 (81)	28 (82)	30 (86)	31 (88)	30 (86)	29 (84)	29 (84)	29 (84)	29 (84)	28 (82)	26 (79)	29 (83)
Mean daily minimum °C (°F)	21 (70)	21 (70)	22 (72)	23 (73)	24 (75)	25 (77)	24 (75)	24 (75)	24 (75)	24 (75)	23 (73)	22 (72)	23 (74)
Average precipitation mm (inches)	40 (1.6)	33 (1.3)	35 (1.4)	38 (1.5)	138 (5.4)	190 (7.5)	242 (9.5)	216 (8.5)	224 (8.8)	200 (7.9)	114 (4.5)	94 (3.7)	1,564 (61.6)
Average rainy days	12.2	9.0	11.0	11.7	21.5	24.0	27.2	26.1	26.8	22.3	16.3	15.1	223.2
Source: Meteoblue

== Demographics ==
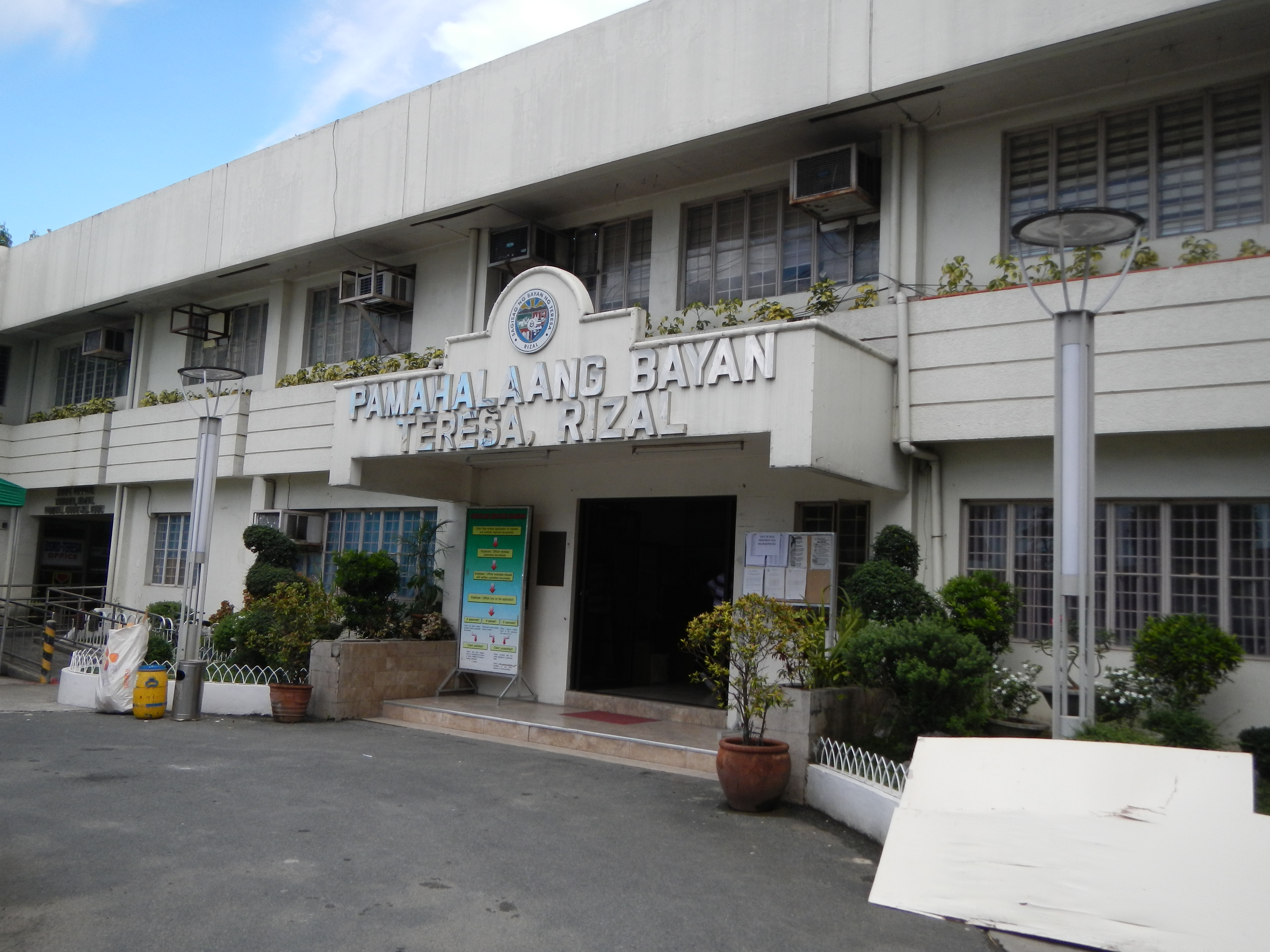
Teresa municipal hall

Population census of Teresa

Year	Pop.	±% p.a.
1903	1,683	—
1939	2,425	+1.02%
1948	3,356	+3.68%
1960	4,928	+3.25%
1970	9,381	+6.64%

Year	Pop.	±% p.a.
1975	13,394	+7.40%
1980	14,781	+1.99%
1990	20,645	+3.40%
1995	23,906	+2.79%
2000	29,745	+4.80%

Year	Pop.	±% p.a.
2007	44,436	+5.69%
2010	47,163	+2.19%
2015	57,755	+3.93%
2020	64,072	+2.21%
2024	67,454	+1.24%

Source: Philippine Statistics Authority

=== Language ===
Most of the people here are Tagalogs.

=== Population ===
In the 2024 census, the population of Teresa was 67,454 people, with a density of 3,600 inhabitants per square kilometre or 9,300 inhabitants per square mile.

=== Religion ===
Major religious denominations: Roman Catholic (75%), Iglesia Ni Cristo (12%), Protestant (2%), Islam (1%), and Others (10%)

== Economy ==
Poverty incidence of Teresa (%)

Source: Philippine Statistics Authority

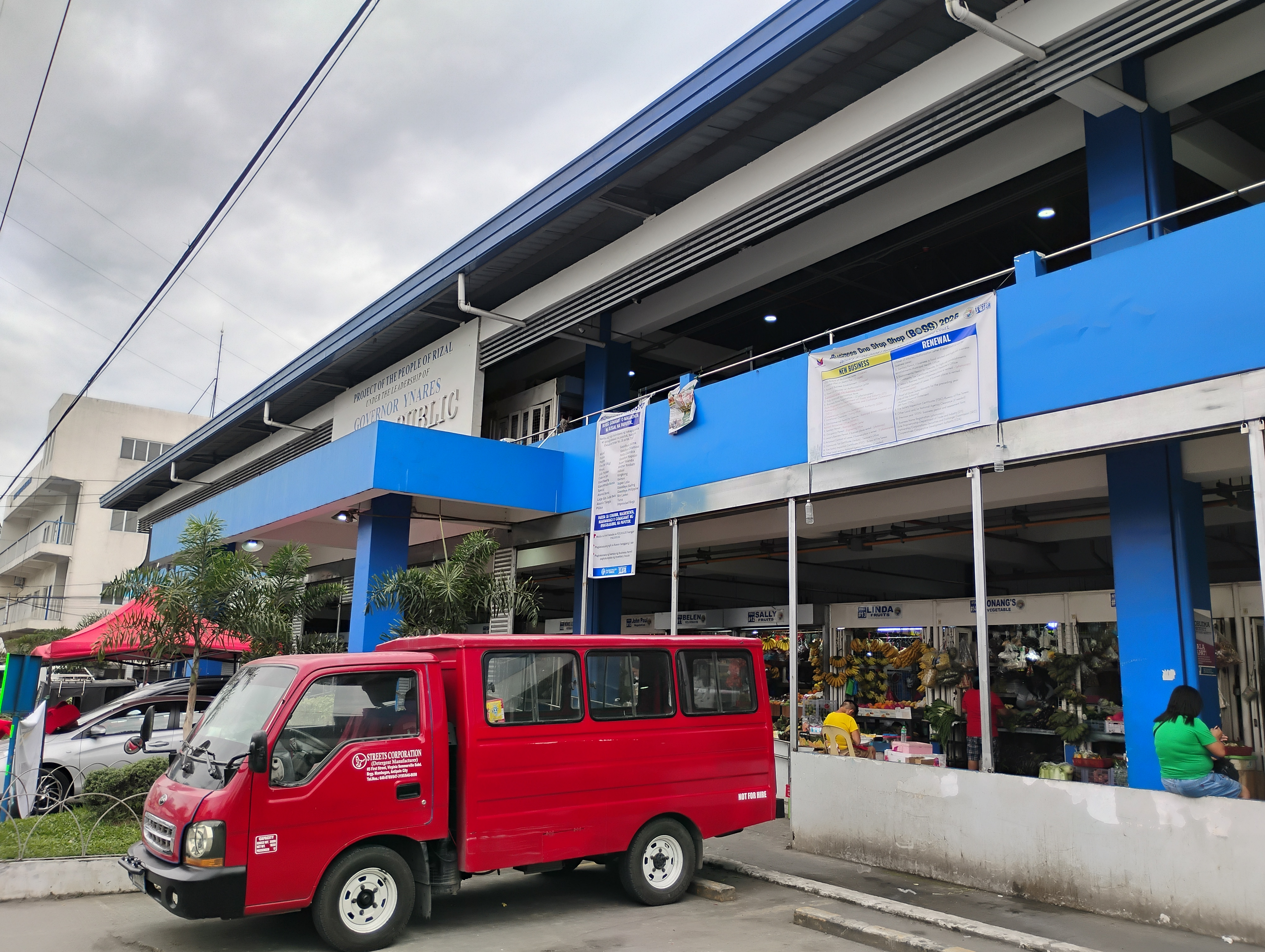
Teresa Public Market

Formerly, the predominant source of livelihood in Teresa is agriculture. But with the opening of the Republic Cement Factory (Formerly FR Cement Factory), Teresa Marble Corporation, and ABC Chemical Factory, members of the community have slowly shifted to industry. More, the real estate boom in the 90s caused a surge in the population in Teresa with the opening of the Carissa Homes East 1 (CHE-1 in Bagumbayan) & 2 (CHE-2 in San Gabriel and Dalig) subdivisions and the La Hacienda, La Montagna and Palazzo Estates located at the highlands of Barangay Bagumbayan.

Annual income is P 85,548,638.56 from manufacturing (cement, marble, limestone quarrying), agro-industrial (piggery and poultry farms), and operation of economic enterprises (public market, slaughter house, sukol spring resort, MRF).

== Infrastructure ==
Basic facilities include 2 hospitals, 10 clinics, and 1 public market.

Power is supplied by the Manila Electric Company. Water supply is through the municipal Teresa Water District (TERWD) and Buhay Na Tubig Multi-Purpose Cooperative.

Educational institutions consist of 1 university and college, 8 high schools, and 12 elementary schools.

== Culture ==
The town's festivals are the Turumba sa Mahal na Patron Santa Rosa which is held every August 23. Anniversary celebration of town independence is held every December 30, and Town fiesta is celebrated every 1st Sunday of March.

== Education ==
The Teresa Schools District Office governs all educational institutions within the municipality. It oversees the management and operations of all private and public, from primary to secondary schools.

=== Primary and elementary schools ===
- Abuyod Elementary School
- Annies Montessori School
- Bagumbayan Elementary School
- Cotton Hills Christian Academy Private School
- Divine Mercy Learning Center
- Jesus Is The Rock Christian Academy
- Miljohn Christian Academy
- Pantay Elementary School
- Prinza Elementary School
- Quiterio San Jose Elementary School
- Quiterio San Jose Elementary School (Sitio Ibabaw Annex)
- Saint Agnes School
- Saint Rose of Lima Montessori School
- Sta. Dorotea Academy
- Teresa Elementary School

=== Secondary schools ===
- Abuyod National High School
- Pantay National High School (Teresa National High School - Pantay Annex)
- Teresa National High School

=== Higher educational institutions ===
- Alzira de Sousa College
- Philsin College Rizal
