= Jalajala =

Municipality in Rizal, Philippines

- Municipality
- Municipality of Jalajala
- Aerial view

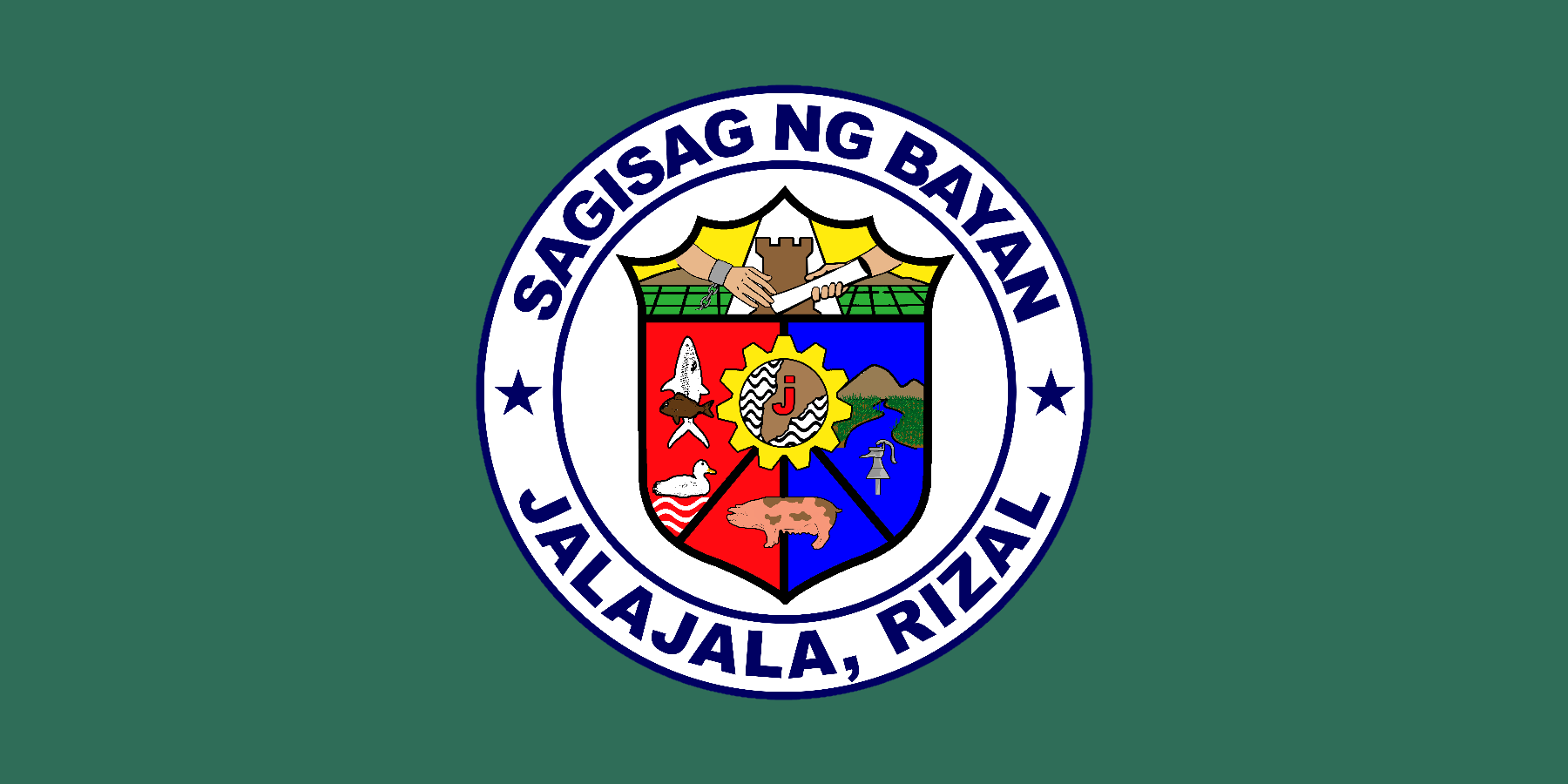
- Flag Seal
- Anthem: Himno ng Bayan ng Jalajala
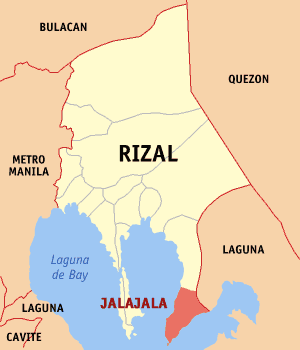
- Map of Rizal with Jalajala highlighted
- Interactive map of Jalajala
- Location within the Philippines
- Coordinates: 14°21′14″N 121°19′26″E
- Country: Philippines
- Region: Calabarzon
- Province: Rizal
- District: 2nd district
- Founded: 1786
- Annexation to Pililla: 1816; October 12, 1903
- Chartered: September 20, 1907
- Barangays: 11 (see Barangays)

Government
  - Type: Sangguniang Bayan
  - Mayor: Jarry V. Añago
  - Vice Mayor: Ramil D. Escarmosa
  - Representative: Emigdio P. Tanjuatco III
  - Municipal Council: Members: Charlott C. Angeles; Bhonard Jay H. Bonita; Randy B. Delos Santos; Racky B. Dumandan; Manolito M. Estrella; Joselito A. Pillas; Clemente P. Rellon; Narciso S. Villaran
  - Electorate: 23,709 voters (2025)

Area
  - Total: 44.12 km^{2} (17.03 sq mi)
- Elevation: 75 m (246 ft)
- Highest elevation: 726 m (2,382 ft)
- Lowest elevation: 2 m (6.6 ft)

Population (2024 census)
  - Total: 34,901
  - Density: 791.0/km^{2} (2,049/sq mi)
  - Households: 8,143

Economy
  - Income class: 3rd municipal income class
  - Poverty incidence: 12.33% (2023)
  - Revenue: ₱ 171.1 million (2024)
  - Assets: ₱ 431.5 million (2024)
  - Expenditure: ₱ 149.2 million (2024)
  - Liabilities: ₱ 99.01 million (2024)

Service provider
  - Electricity: Manila Electric Company (Meralco)
  - Water: Manila Water
- Time zone: UTC+8 (PST)
- ZIP code: 1990
- PSGC: 0405807000
- IDD : area code: +63 (0)2
- Native languages: Tagalog
- Website: www.jalajala.gov.ph

Jalajala (Tagalog pronunciation: [hälɐ̞ˈhalɐ (-ˈhala)]; also spelled as Jala-jala), officially the Municipality of Jalajala (Tagalog: Bayan ng Jalajala), is a municipality in the province of Rizal, Philippines. According to the 2024 census, it has a population of 34,901 people.

== Etymology ==
What is now the town's Barangay Punta was the seat of an earlier settlement later known as Halaán. During the summer from April to May, the shores of Laguna de Bay along Punta would be filled with small shellfish locally known as halaán.

As is typical with many modern Philippine toponyms, the town's name supposedly resulted from miscommunication between early Spanish visitors and natives. The Spaniards enquired of some natives along the shoreline, "¿Como se llama este sitio?" ("What is the name of this place?") to which the latter replied, "halaán pò," thinking that the foreigners referred to the shells. The Spaniards accepted the response as the name of the place, and began calling it halaán, later corrupting it into Chimae then into Jalajala.

Another folk etymology is that Jalajala stems from an endemic breed of boar called berk jala, which is abundant in the wilds around the town and is depicted on its seal. As with the other story, a Spaniard asked the Tagalog-speaking natives the place's name, and the locals' interjection of "hala-hala” (possibly a hunting chant) was taken by the Spaniards to be their answer.

== History ==
In 1610, it became part of Villa de Pila, an encomienda in La Laguna where locals were encouraged to raise livestock. On September 7, 1676, Jalajala was separated from Villa de Pila for civil and ecclesiastical administration. A bamboo church was built in 1678, followed by a stone church in 1733. The first map of Jalajala was drawn by Engineer Feliciano Marquez in 1767, titled “Islas de Jalajala.”

In 1786, Jalajala, initially a barrio, separated from Pililla to become an independent town, with the help of Don Julio Dollar. However, it was reverted to a barrio of Pililla in 1816. According to a Spanish historian, the development of Jalajala as a pueblo or town began as early as 1823.

The area became part of the Distrito delos Montes de San Mateo (later District of Morong) in 1853 and later Rizal in 1901. On October 12, 1903, it was returned to Pililla once again by virtue of Act No. 942. Jalajala was re-established as a chartered municipality on March 27, 1907, by virtue of Act No. 1720. Simeon Perez was elected as its first municipal president following the November 1907 election. It was auctioned in 1920 due to unpaid taxes, becoming the first Filipino-owned town.

From 1942 to 1945, during World War II, Jalajala was occupied by Japanese forces, and local guerrilla groups resisted occupation. The town was liberated in 1945. In 1979, the Japan International Cooperation Agency (JICA) supported infrastructure development, fostering growth in transportation, education, and agriculture.

== Geography ==
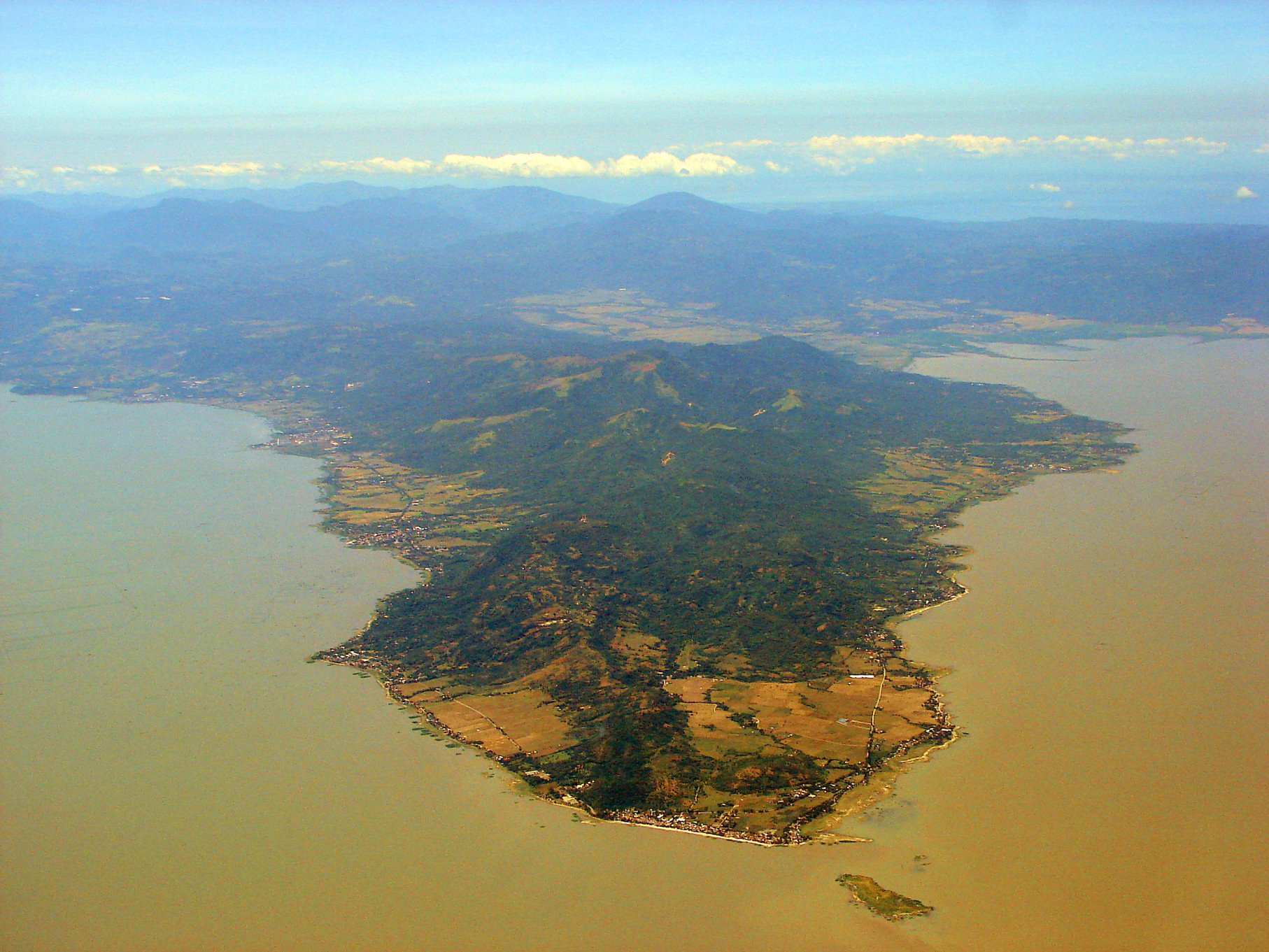
Aerial view of Jalajala

Jalajala is on a peninsula located 75 kilometers (47 mi) southeast of Manila in the largest freshwater lake in the Philippines, Laguna de Bay. It lies on the eastern part of the Rizal Province and has a land area of 4,930 hectares (12,200 acres) representing 3.77% of the total land area of the province. Jalajala's political boundary on the north is the Panguil River, wherein it shares the boundary with the town of Pakil in Laguna. On its southern, eastern, and western boundaries lies Laguna de Bay.

Mount Sembrano forms the boundary of Jalajala and Pililla.

=== Barangays ===
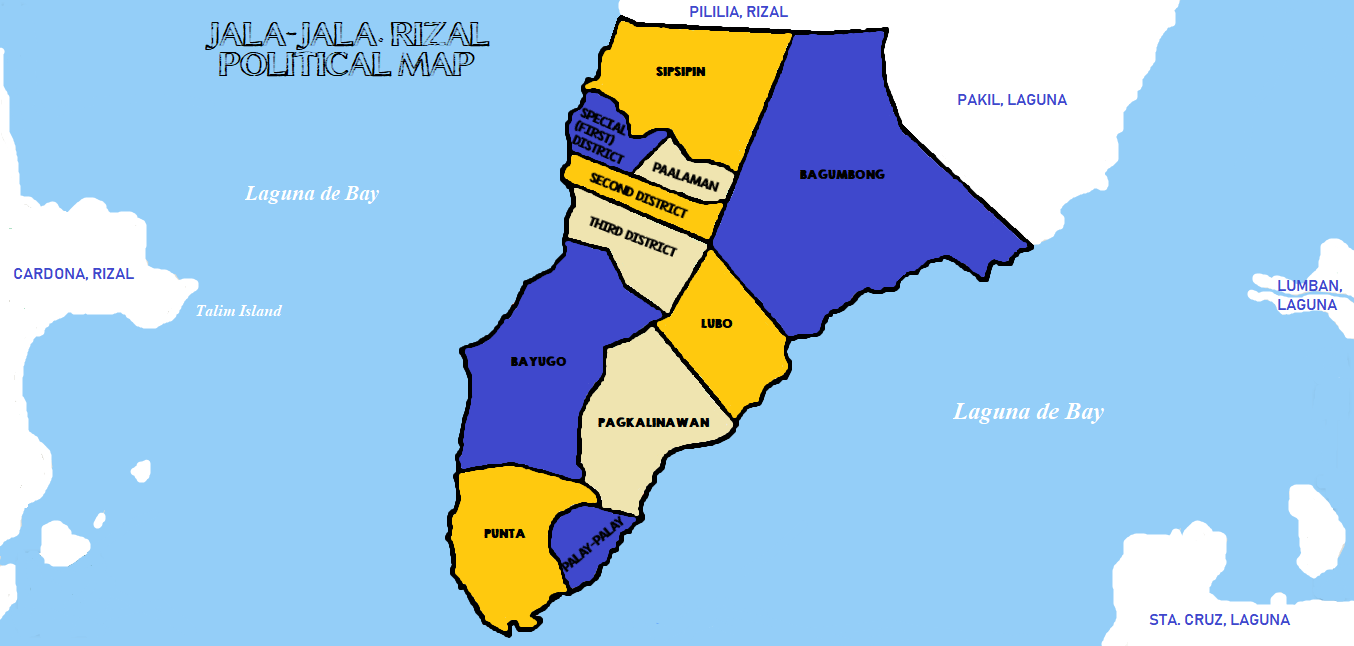
Jala-jala, Rizal political map (subject to correction)

Jalajala is politically subdivided into 11 barangays (three urban, eight rural), as indicated in the matrix below and the image herein. Each barangay consists of puroks and some have sitios.

- Bagumbong
- Bayugo
- Second District (Poblacion)
- Third District (Poblacion)
- Lubo
- Pagkalinawan
- Palaypalay
- Punta
- Sipsipin
- First (Special) District (Poblacion)
- Paalaman

Bayugo, Palay-Palay, and Sipsipin were elevated to barrios in 1956.

=== Climate ===
Climate data for Jalajala, Rizal
Month	Jan	Feb	Mar	Apr	May	Jun	Jul	Aug	Sep	Oct	Nov	Dec	Year
Mean daily maximum °C (°F)	26 (79)	27 (81)	29 (84)	31 (88)	31 (88)	30 (86)	29 (84)	29 (84)	29 (84)	29 (84)	28 (82)	26 (79)	29 (84)
Daily mean °C (°F)	24 (75)	24.5 (76.1)	26.5 (79.7)	27 (81)	27.5 (81.5)	27.5 (81.5)	26.5 (79.7)	26.5 (79.7)	26.5 (79.7)	26.5 (79.7)	26 (79)	24.5 (76.1)	26.1 (79.1)
Mean daily minimum °C (°F)	22 (72)	22 (72)	22 (72)	23 (73)	24 (75)	25 (77)	24 (75)	24 (75)	24 (75)	24 (75)	24 (75)	23 (73)	23 (74)
Average precipitation mm (inches)	58 (2.3)	41 (1.6)	32 (1.3)	29 (1.1)	91 (3.6)	143 (5.6)	181 (7.1)	162 (6.4)	172 (6.8)	164 (6.5)	113 (4.4)	121 (4.8)	1,307 (51.5)
Average rainy days	13.4	9.3	9.1	9.8	19.1	22.9	26.6	24.9	25.0	21.4	16.5	16.5	214.5
Source: Meteoblue

== Demographics ==
Population census of Jalajala
Year	Pop.	±% p.a.
1903	1,217	—
1918	1,584	+1.77%
1939	1,532	−0.16%
1948	2,429	+5.25%
1960	5,223	+6.59%
1970	8,115	+4.50%
1975	9,276	+2.72%
1980	11,945	+5.19%
1990	16,318	+3.17%
1995	19,873	+3.76%
2000	23,280	+3.45%
2007	28,738	+2.95%
2010	30,074	+1.67%
2015	32,254	+1.34%
2020	34,017	+1.13%
2024	34,901	+0.62%
Source: Philippine Statistics Authority

In the 2024 census, the population of Jala-jala was 34,901 people, with a density of 790 inhabitants per square kilometer or 2,000 inhabitants per square mile.

== Economy ==
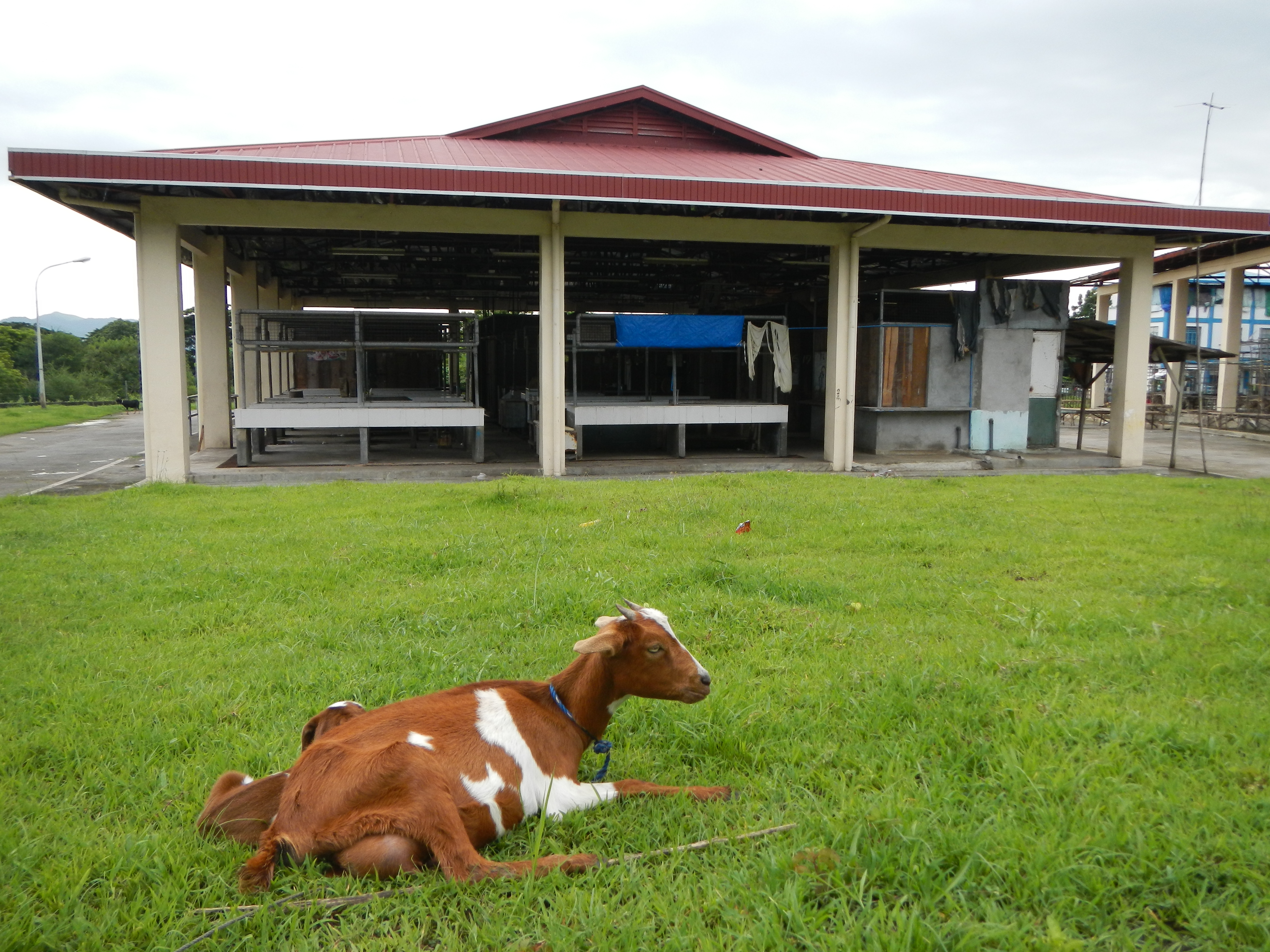
Jalajala Public Market

Poverty incidence of Jalajala (%)

Source: Philippine Statistics Authority

== Government ==
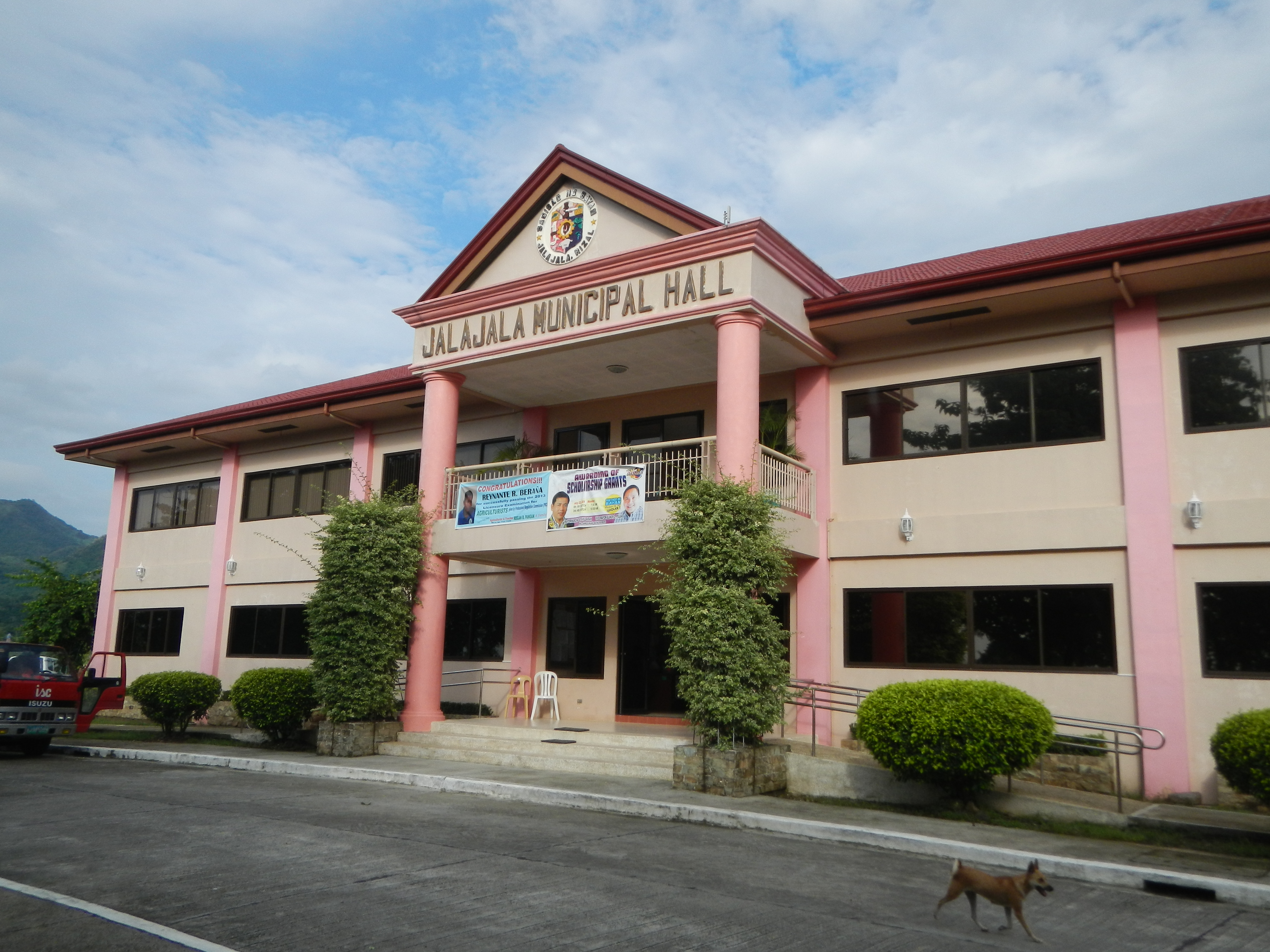
Municipal hall

=== Local government ===
The municipality is governed by a municipal mayor designated as its local chief executive and by a municipal council as its legislative body in accordance with the Local Government Code. The mayor, vice mayor, and the councilors are elected directly by the people through an election which is being held every three years.

=== Elected officials ===
List of current government officials from June 30, 2025.

Members of the Municipal Council (2025–2028)
Title	Name
Mayor	Jarry V. Añago
Vice Mayor	Ramil D. Escarmosa
Councilor	Charlott C. Angeles
Councilor	Bhonard Jay H. Bonita
Councilor	Randy B. Delos Santos
Councilor	Racky B. Dumandan
Councilor	Manolito M. Estrella
Councilor	Joselito A. Pillas
Councilor	Clemente P. Rellon
Councilor	Narciso S. Villaran
ABC / LNB President	
SK President	

=== List of mayors ===
No.	Mayor	Term	Party
1	Maximo Bellin	1945	Nacionalista
2	Carlos dela Vega	1945–1951	Liberal
3	Juan delos Santos	1952–1963	Nacionalista
4	Agaton Gellido	1964–1967	Nacionalista
5	Juan Vidallo	1968–1971	Liberal
6	Alejandro Gellido	1972–1973	Nacionalista
7	Arsenio Pillas	1973–1980	Nacionalista
8	Voltaire B. Gellido	1980–1986	Nacionalista
9	Alejandro Perez Jr.	1986–1987	LDP
10	Avelino Salgatar	1987–1988	LDP
(9)	Alejandro Perez Jr.	1988–1992	LDP
11	Walfredo M. dela Vega	1992–1995	NPC
12	Jose B. delos Santos	1995–2004	Lakas
13	Elionor I. Pillas	2004–2013	NPC
14	Narciso S. Villaran	2013–2016	UNA
(13)	Elionor I. Pillas	2016–2019	NPC
15	Elmer C. Pillas	2019–2025	NPC
16	Jarry V. Añago	2025–present	PFP

== Education ==
The Jalajala Schools District Office governs all educational institutions within the municipality. It oversees the management and operations of all private and public, from primary to secondary schools.

=== Primary and elementary schools ===
- Bagumbong Elementary School
- Bayugo Elementary School
- Glorious Hope Christian School
- Greenfield Montessori School
- Jalajala Christian Academy
- Jalajala Elementary School
- Jiane Therese International School
- John Paul Integrated Montessori School
- Lovebell Christian School
- Lubo ES
- Our Lady of Mulawin School
- Pagkalinawan ES
- Palaypalay Elementary School
- Punta Elementary School
- Sipsipin Elementary School
- St. Michael Parochial School

=== Secondary schools ===
- Bagumbong National High School
- Bayugo National High School
- Jalajala National High School

=== Hidilyn Diaz Weightlifting Academy ===
In July 2024, Hidilyn Diaz inaugurated her weightlifting academy in Jalajala, including the academy's training programs and the HDWLA Outreach Program. The 108-square-meter (1,160 sq ft) single-storey training facility is built upon her 7,000-square-meter (75,000 sq ft) lot in Sitio Manggahan, Barangay Second District. It is equipped with four platforms.
