= Dino Tanjuatco =

Filipino politician

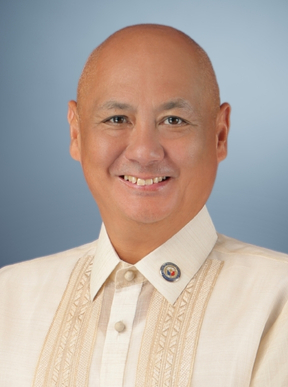
- Official portrait, 2025

Member of the Philippine House of Representatives from Rizal's 2nd district
- Incumbent
- Assumed office June 30, 2022
- Preceded by: Juan Fidel Felipe F. Nograles

Member of the Rizal Provincial Board from the 2nd district
- In office June 30, 2019 – June 30, 2022
- In office June 30, 2007 – June 30, 2016
- In office June 30, 2001 – June 30, 2004

President and CEO of the Clark International Airport Corporation
- In office October 3, 2014 – August 19, 2016
- Appointed by: Benigno Aquino III
- Preceded by: Victor Jose Luciano
- Succeeded by: Alexander Cauguiran

Personal details
- Born: Emigdio Palou Tanjuatco III; January 12, 1970 (age 56) Manila, Philippines
- Party: NPC (2024–present)
- Other political affiliations: Liberal (2008–2024); KAMPI (2006–2008); Lakas (2000–2006)
- Parents: Emigdio Sumulong Tanjuatco Jr. (father); Norma Palou Tanjuatco (mother)
- Education: Ateneo de Manila University (BA, JD)
- Profession: Lawyer
- Website: https://www.dinotanjuatco.com/

Emigdio "Dino" Palou Tanjuatco III (born January 12, 1970) is a Filipino lawyer and politician who has served as a representative for Rizal's second district since 2022 as a member of the Nationalist People's Coalition.

== Early life and career ==
Tanjuatco attended Ateneo de Manila University, where he completed his elementary (1983), secondary (1987), and tertiary educations, wherein he completed a Bachelor of Arts major in Interdisciplinary Studies in 1991 and a Juris Doctor degree in 1995. He passed the bar exams in 1996.

Tanjuatco served as a member of the Rizal Provincial Board representing the province's second district for three terms from 2013 to 2022. In 2014, President Benigno Aquino III appointed Tanjuatco as President and CEO of the Clark International Airport Corporation, serving from October 3, 2014, to August 19, 2016.

== House of Representatives ==
In the 2022 Philippine general election, Tanjuatco successfully contested the seat for Rizal's second district, which was previously redistricted to form the third and fourth districts of the province. He was re-elected in 2025.
