= Ynares =

Ynares may refer to:

== Places in the Philippines ==
- Casimiro A. Ynares Sr, Memorial National High School, a public high school in Rizal
- Don Jose M. Ynares Sr. Memorial National High School, a public high school in Rizal
- Ynares Center (Antipolo), an indoor arena in Antipolo, Rizal
- Ynares Center (Rodriguez, Rizal), an indoor arena in Rodriguez, Rizal
- Ynares Sports Arena, an indoor arena in Pasig

== People with the surname Ynares ==
- Casimiro Ynares Jr. (born 1946), former governor of Rizal, former mayor of Binangonan, and former Presidential Adviser for Southern Tagalog
- Casimiro Ynares III (born 1973), mayor of Antipolo, and former governor of Rizal
- Consuelo Ynares-Santiago (born 1939), former associate justice of the Supreme Court of the Philippines
- Mia Ynares (born 1976), representative of Rizal's 1st congressional district
- Nina Ynares (born 1970), governor of Rizal
- Rebecca Ynares (born 1949), former governor of Rizal
- Rhea Ynares (born 1984), mayor of Binangonan
