= List of members of the Nationalist People's Coalition =

This is a list of the members of the Nationalist People's Coalition.

The Nationalist People's Coalition (NPC) is a conservative political party in the Philippines which was founded in 1992 by presidential candidate Danding Cojuangco.

The members mentioned on the list are divided into their highest position, whether it be representative, governor, vice-governor, or another position.

== Members ==
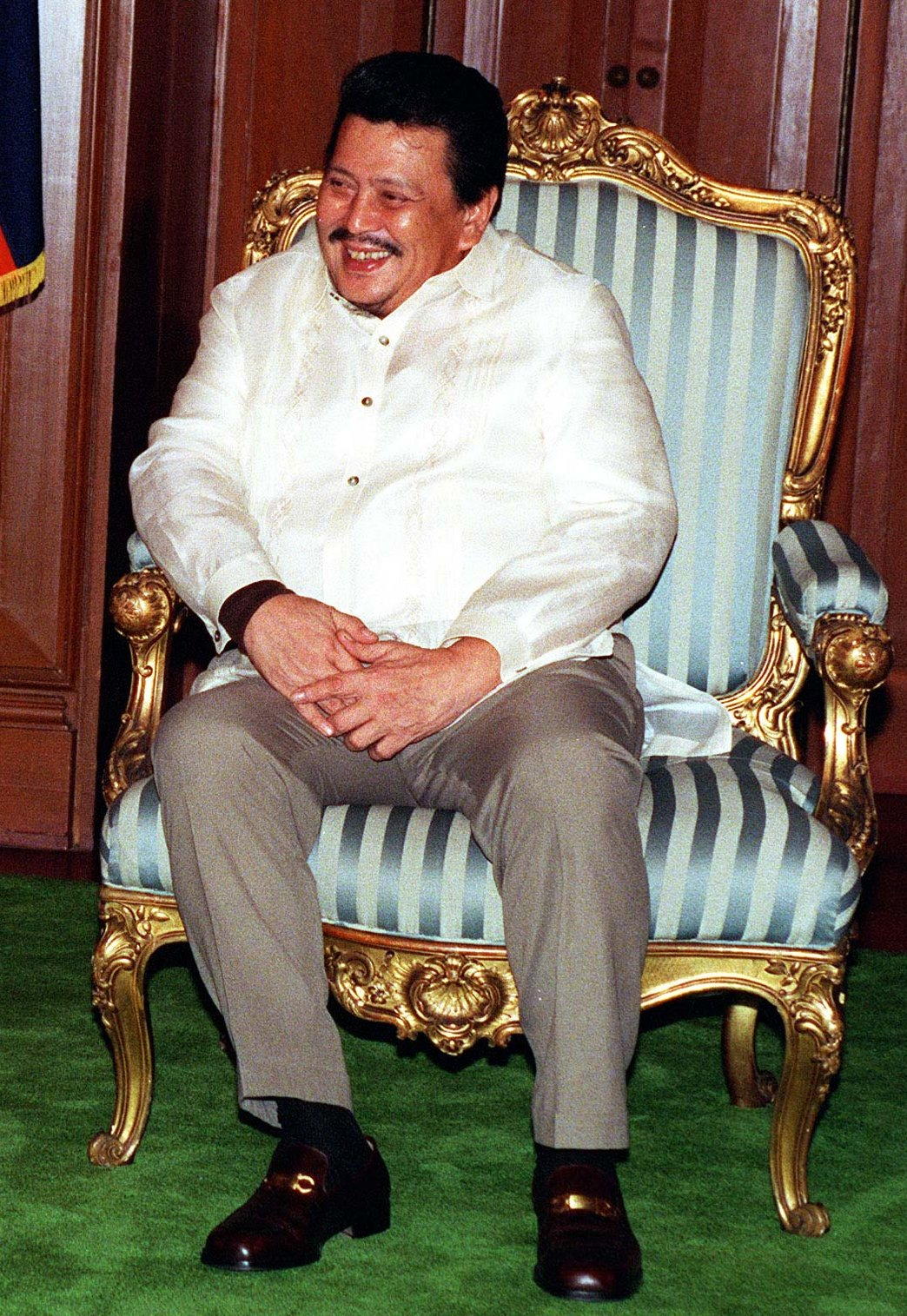
Joseph Estrada in 1998

=== Presidents ===
Name	Positions	Notes	References
Joseph Estrada	Vice President of the Philippines	as NPC	

=== Senators ===
Name	Positions	District	Notes	References
Nikki Coseteng	Senator of the Philippines	Nationwide at-large	as NPC	
JV Ejercito	Senator of the Philippines	Nationwide at-large	as NPC	
Francis Escudero	Congressman for Sorsogon's 1st congressional district, House Minority Leader, Governor of Sorsogon, Senator of the Philippines	Nationwide at-large	as NPC	
Win Gatchalian	Mayor of Valenzuela, Congressman for Valenzuela's 1st congressional district, Senator of the Philippines	Nationwide at-large		
Lito Lapid	Vice Governor of Pampanga, Governor of Pampanga, Senator of the Philippines	Nationwide at-large	as NPC	
Loren Legarda	Senator of the Philippines, Congresswoman for Antique's at-large congressional district	Nationwide at-large	as NPC	
Ernesto Maceda	Senator of the Philippines	Nationwide at-large	as NPC	
John Henry Osmeña	Congressman for Cebu's at-large congressional district, Senator of the Philippines, Mayor of Toledo, Cebu	Nationwide at-large	as NPC	
Tito Sotto	Senator of the Philippines	Nationwide at-large	as NPC	
Arturo Tolentino	Senator of the Philippines	Nationwide at-large	as NPC	

=== Congressman ===
==== Ilocos Region ====
Name	Position	References
Ronald Singson	Congressman for Ilocos Sur's 1st congressional district	
Kristine Singson-Meehan	Congresswoman for Ilocos Sur's 2nd congressional district	
Victor Francisco Ortega	Congressman for La Union's 1st congressional district	
Manuel Ortega	Congressman for La Union's 1st congressional district	
Pablo Ortega	Congressman for La Union's 1st congressional district	
Francisco Paolo P. Ortega V	Congressman for La Union's 1st congressional district	
Dette Escudero	Congresswoman for Sorsogon's 1st congressional district	

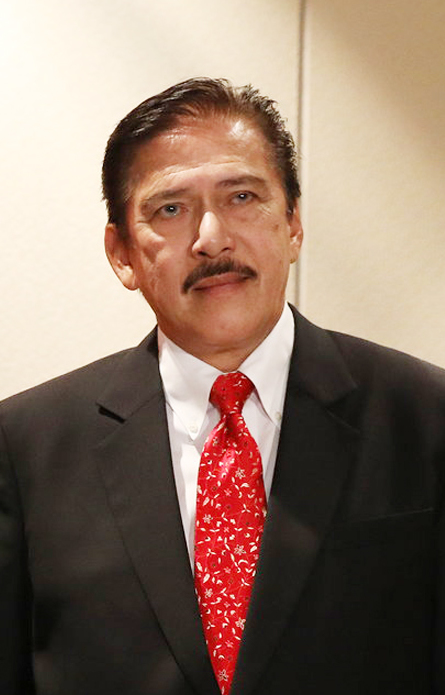
A photo of Tito Sotto, current NPC Chairman

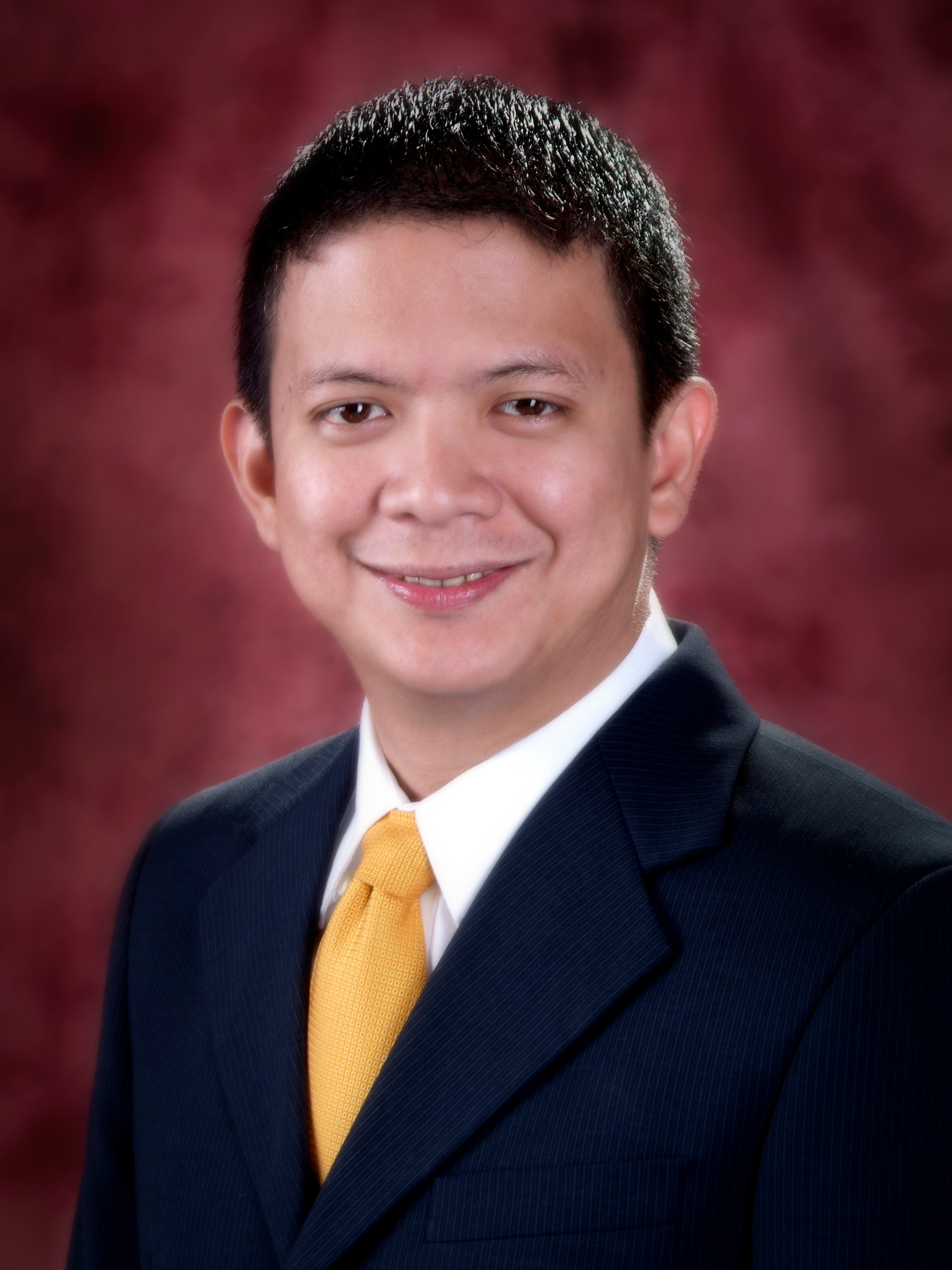
A photo of Francis Escudero

=== Governors ===
==== Calabarzon ====
Name	Position	References
Johnny Remulla	Governor of Cavite	
Angelina Tan	Governor of Quezon	
Casimiro Ynares Jr.	Governor of Rizal	
Nina Ynares	Governor of Rizal	
Rebecca Ynares	Governor of Rizal	

=== Mayors ===
Name	Position	References
Benjamin Magalong	Mayor of Baguio	
Casimiro Ynares III	Mayor of Antipolo	
Rhea Ynares	Mayor of Binangonan	
