= 2025 Rizal local elections =

Part of the 2025 Philippine general election

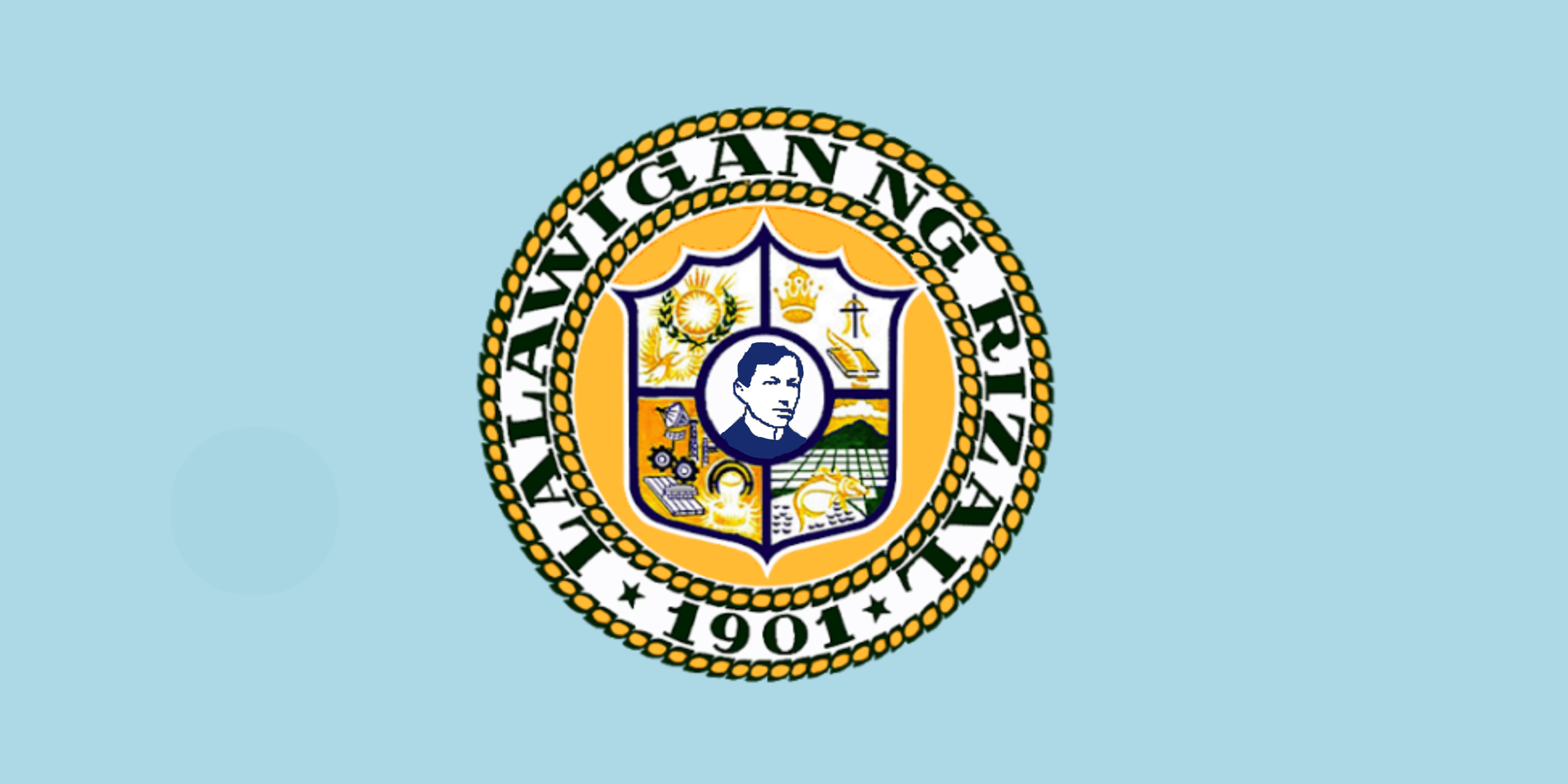
- May 12, 2025
- Registered: 1,671,643▲4.35 pp
- Turnout: 1,275,452 (76.29% ▼4.74pp)
- Gubernatorial election
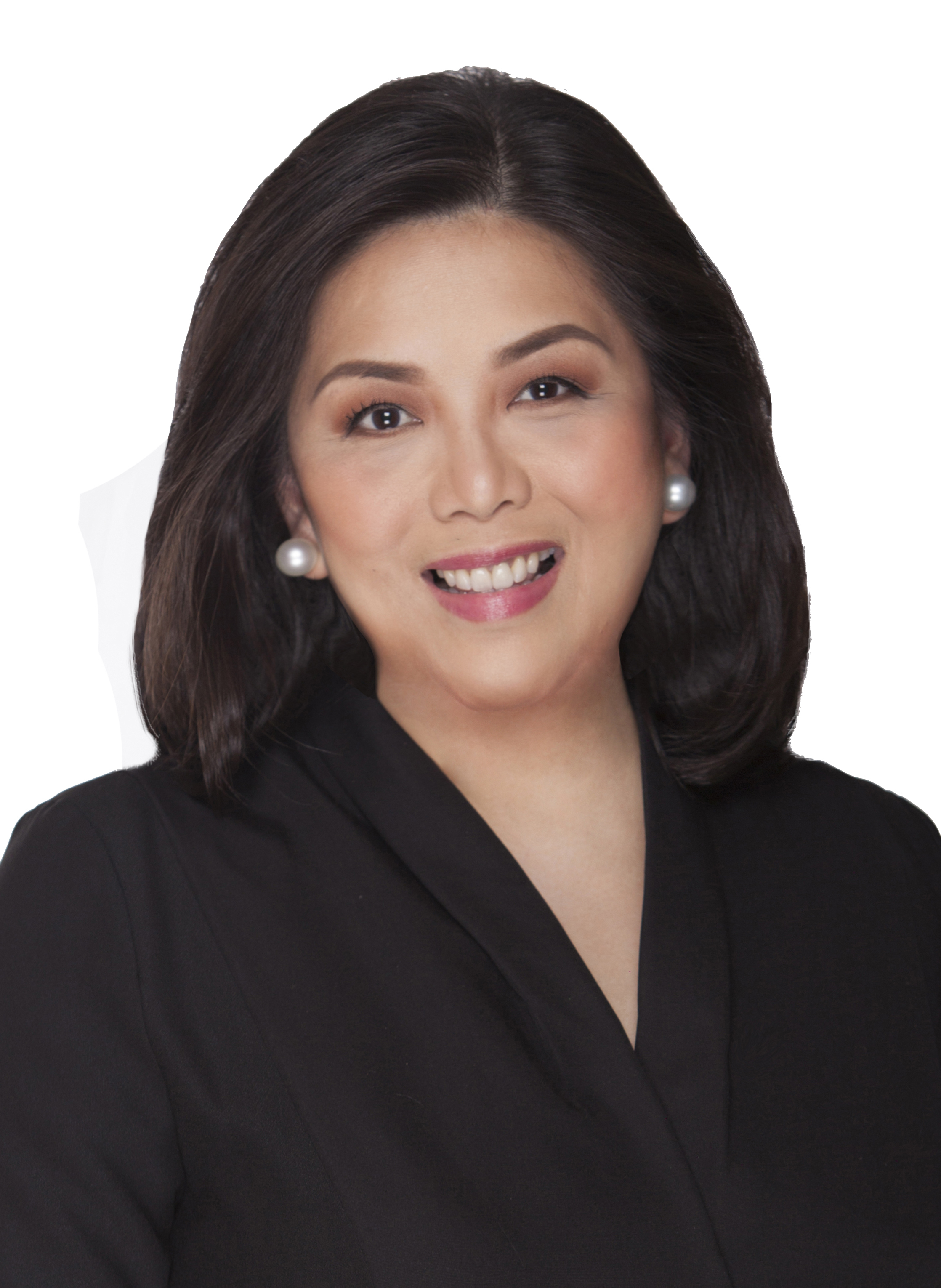
		IND
Candidate	Nina Ynares	Jose Velasco
Party	NPC	Independent
Alliance	Team Ynares
Running mate	Pining Gatlabayan
Popular vote	884,132	75,331
Percentage	83.48%	7.11%
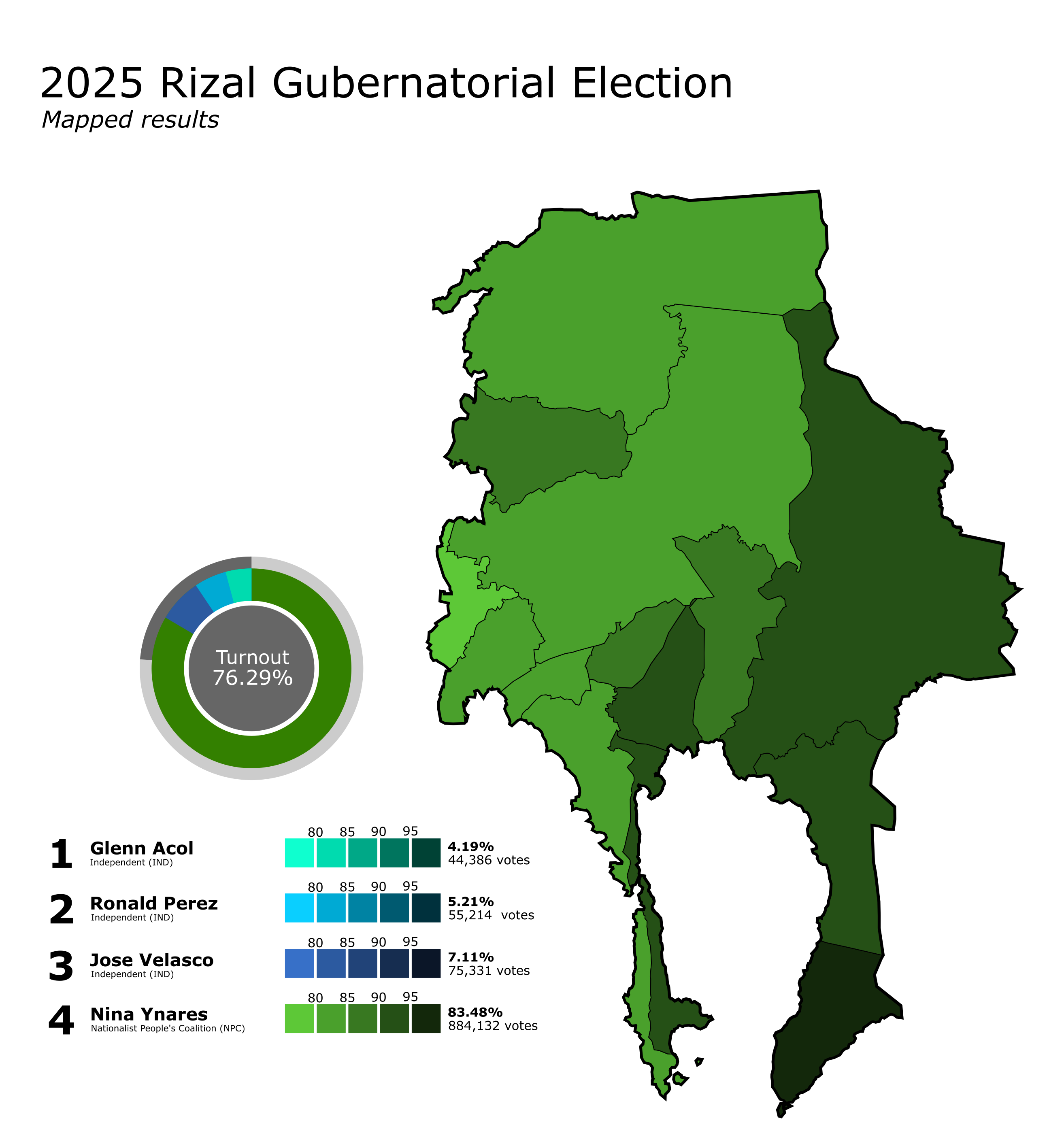
- Gubernatorial election results by City and Municipality.
Governor before election
Nina Ynares
NPC
Elected Governor
Nina Ynares
NPC
- Vice gubernatorial election
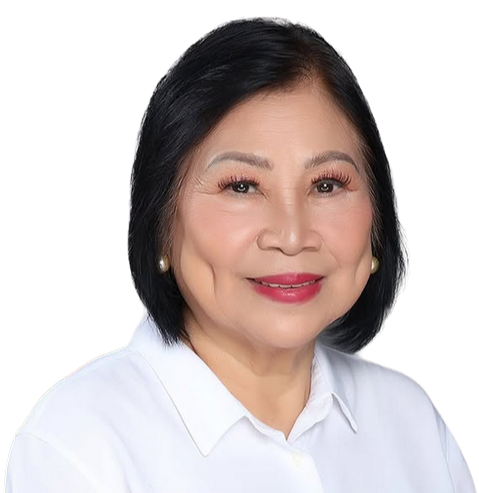
		IND
Candidate	Pining Gatlabayan	Jojo Bautista
Party	NPC	Independent
Alliance	Team Ynares
Popular vote	600,553	135,917
Percentage	64.00%	14.48%
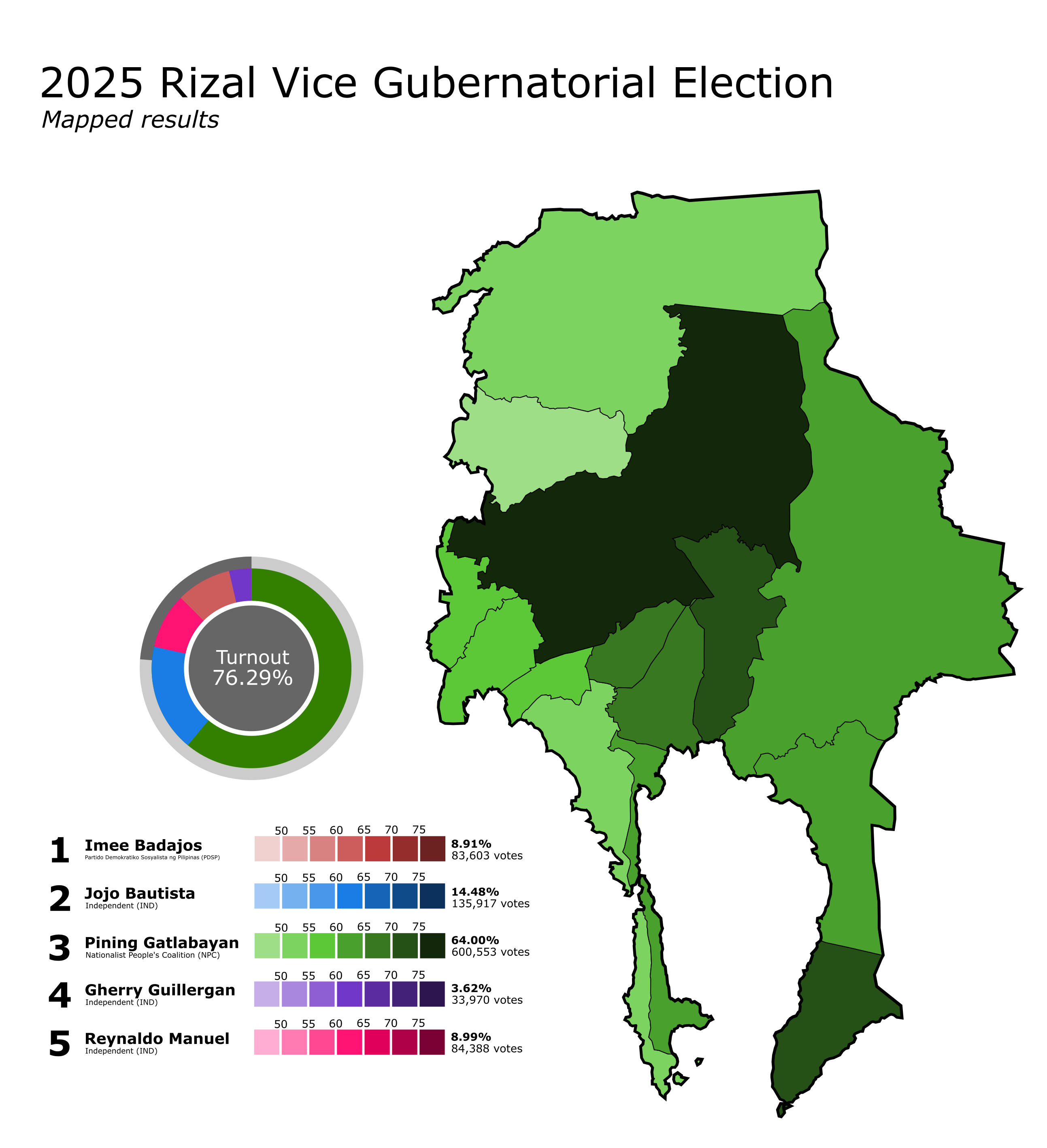
- Vice gubernatorial election results by City and Municipality.
Vice Governor before election
Reynaldo San Juan Jr.
PFP
Elected Vice Governor
Pining Gatlabayan
NPC
- Provincial board election

10 of 14 seats in the Rizal Provincial Board 8 seats needed for a majority
	First party	Second party	Third party
Party	NPC	Nacionalista	PFP
Last election	8 seats, 68.58%	Did not participate	Did not participate
Seats won	6	1	1
Seat change	▼2	▲1	▲1
Popular vote	937,585	142,671	120,180
Percentage	54.20%	8.25%	6.95%
	Fourth party	Fifth party	Sixth party
Party	NUP	PDP	Independent
Last election	1 seat, 6.56%	1 seat, 7.11%	0 seats, 7.80%
Seats won	1	1	0
Seat change	Steady	Steady	Steady
Popular vote	104,810	44,974	379,799
Percentage	6.06%	2.60%	21.95%

Local elections were held in the province of Rizal on May 12, 2025, as part of the 2025 general election. Voters had selected candidates for all local positions: a town mayor, vice mayor, and town councilors, as well as members of the Sangguniang Panlalawigan, the governor, vice governor, district representatives for the four districts of Rizal, and district representatives for Antipolo's two districts.

The province's election turnout was 76.29% (1,953 election returns), equivalent to 1,275,452 of 1,671,643 total registered voters. With 884,132 votes, incumbent governor Nina Ynares retained her seat and won a landslide victory over her closest opponent, Jose Velasco, who received 75,331 votes. Her reelection marks the Ynares family's extended rule over the province of Rizal, which has lasted since 1992. On the other hand, incumbent Antipolo vice mayor Pining Gatlabayan won her election bid as the province's vice governor, garnering 600,553 votes.

The Nationalist People's Coalition remained the most dominant party inside the Sangguniang Panlalawigan, as all of its 6 candidates in the 2025 midterm elections had secured their seats. Their allies from the Nacionalista Party, National Unity Party, and Partido Federal ng Pilipinas all secured a seat as well. This gives Team Ynares a supermajority in the Sangguniang Panlalawigan for the next three years.

== Candidates ==
=== Administration coalition ===
Team Ynares
#	Name	Party
For Governor
4.	Nina Ynares	NPC
For Vice Governor
3.	Pining Gatlabayan	NPC
For House of Representatives (1st District)
4.	Mia Ynares	NPC
For House of Representatives (2nd District)
2.	Dino Tanjuatco	NPC
For House of Representatives (3rd District)
2.	Jojo Garcia	NPC
For House of Representatives (4th District)
1.	Tom Hernandez	NPC
For House of Representatives (Antipolo 1st District)
2.	Ronaldo Puno	NUP
For House of Representatives (Antipolo 2nd District)
1.	Romeo Acop	NUP
For Board Member (1st District)
2.	Jestoni Alarcon	NPC
4.	Papoo Cruz	NPC
7.	Kay Ilagan-Conde	NPC
9.	Patnubay Tiamson	Nacionalista
For Board Member (2nd District)
2.	Boboy Bernardos	NPC
4.	Reynaldo San Juan Jr.	PFP
For Board Member (4th District)
1.	Rafhael Ayuson	NPC
For Board Member (Antipolo 1st District)
1.	Nick Puno	NUP
For Board Member (Antipolo 2nd District)
1.	Nilo Leyble	NPC

=== Opposition coalitions ===
Alaga at Asenso
#	Name	Party
For Vice Governor
1.	Imee Badajos	PDSP
For House of Representatives (1st District)
2.	Jay Narciso	PDSP

PDP-Reporma
#	Name	Party
For House of Representatives (1st District)
1.	Anton Galias	Reporma
For Board Member (1st District)
6.	Joseph Huang	Independent

People's Choice
#	Name	Party
For Vice Governor
2.	Jojo Bautista	Independent
For Board Member (4th District)
3.	Benjamin Pascual	Independent

=== Non-independents not in tickets ===
#	Name	Party
For House of Representatives (3rd District)
1.	Paeng Diaz	AKAY
For House of Representatives (4th District)
2.	Fidel Nograles	Lakas
For House of Representatives (Antipolo 1st District)
1.	Sonia Ampo	WPP
For Board Member (3rd District)
1.	John Patrick Bautista	PDP
5.	Philip Lustre	PFP

=== Independents not in tickets ===
#	Name	Party
For Governor
1.	Glenn Acol	Independent
2.	Ronald Perez	Independent
3.	Jose Velasco	Independent
For Vice Governor
4.	Gherry Guillergan	Independent
5.	Reynaldo Manuel	Independent
For House of Representatives (1st District)
3.	JB Pallasigue	Independent
For House of Representatives (2nd District)
1.	Boy Mendiola	Independent
For House of Representatives (Antipolo 1st District)
3.	Manuel Relorcasa	Independent
For Board Member (1st District)
1.	Boy Agpalo	Independent
3.	Edwin Cruz	Independent
5.	Louie Dela Rosa	Independent
8.	Jakz Mamba	Independent
For Board Member (2nd District)
1.	Evan Daryll Aguelo	Independent
3.	Arturo Gimenez	Independent
For Board Member (3rd District)
2.	Jancat Cataluña	Independent
3.	Abet Enriquez	Independent
4.	Ariel Gutierrez	Independent
For Board Member (4th District)
2.	Lot Pascua	Independent
4.	Oliver Santos	Independent
For Board Member (Antipolo 2nd District)
2.	Emmanuel Yator	Independent

== Gubernatorial election ==
The incumbent governor is Nina Ynares, who has served since 2022 after being elected with 85.52% of the vote. She is seeking reelection for a second consecutive term.

=== Candidates ===
- Glenn Acol (Independent), former candidate for member of the Rizal Provincial Board for the 1st district in the 2019
- Ronald Perez (Independent), neophyte
- Jose Velasco (Independent), former candidate for governor of Rizal in 2022
- Nina Ynares (NPC), incumbent governor of Rizal (2022–present)

=== Opinion polling ===
Fieldwork Date(s)	Pollster	Sample Size	MoE	Acol Ind.	Perez Ind.	Velasco Ind.	Ynares NPC	Und./ None
Apr 21–28	South Luzon News Media	790	—	10.63	1.64	0.50	83.54	3.67
Apr 19–24	Serbisyong Pilipinas	886	—	16.48	6.09	0.56	76.86	—
Mar 7–9	South Luzon News Media	704	—	5.5	1.7	0.8	87.0	4.4

=== Results ===
Rizal gubernatorial election
Party	Candidate	Votes	%
NPC	Nina Ynares	884,132	83.48
Independent	Jose Velasco	75,331	7.11
Independent	Ronald Perez	55,214	5.21
Independent	Glenn Acol	44,386	4.19
Valid ballots		1,059,063	83.01
Invalid or blank votes		216,389	16.99
Total votes		1,275,452	100.00
NPC hold			

Popular vote percentage
Nina Ynares	83.48%
Jose Velasco	7.11%
Ronald Perez	5.21%
Glenn Acol	4.19%

==== Per City/ Municipality ====
City/ Municipality	Glenn Acol		Ronald Perez		Jose Velasco		Nina Ynares	
City/ Municipality	Votes	%	Votes	%	Votes	%	Votes	%
Angono	1,561	3.76	2,501	6.02	3,786	9.12	33,676	81.10
Antipolo	12,897	4.72	17,443	6.39	20,268	7.42	222,531	81.47
Baras	600	2.17	1,028	3.71	1,323	4.78	24,733	89.34
Binangonan	3,368	3.75	5,166	5.75	7,784	8.67	73,497	81.83
Cainta	5,743	5.36	6,407	5.97	12,547	11.70	82,536	76.97
Cardona	387	1.85	630	3.01	842	4.03	19,042	91.11
Jalajala	122	0.73	324	1.95	309	1.86	15,861	95.46
Morong	583	2.03	1,015	3.54	1,180	4.12	25,878	90.31
Pililla	455	1.60	697	2.45	914	3.21	26,403	92.74
Rodriguez	10,720	7.27	8,831	5.99	9,445	6.41	118,463	80.34
San Mateo	2,426	2.61	3,669	3.95	4,713	5.08	81,995	88.35
Tanay	799	1.66	1,299	2.69	1,785	3.70	44,391	91.96
Taytay	3,894	3.64	5,070	4.74	8,719	8.15	89,267	83.47
Teresa	831	2.81	1,134	3.84	1,716	5.81	25,859	87.54
TOTAL	44,386	4.19	55,214	5.21	75,331	7.11	884,132	83.48

== Vice gubernatorial election ==
The incumbent vice governor, Reynaldo San Juan Jr., who has served since 2016, is now term-limited. He had decided to stage a comeback as a member of the Rizal Provincial Board for the second district. Incumbent Antipolo vice mayor Pining Gatlabayan is running in his place. Her opponents are businesswoman Imee Badajos, Jojo Bautista, Gherry Guillergan, and Reynaldo Manuel.

=== Candidates ===
- Imee Badajos (PDSP), businesswoman
- Jojo Bautista (Independent), neophyte
- Pining Gatlabayan (NPC), incumbent vice mayor of Antipolo (2016–present)
- Gherry Guillergan (Independent), former candidate for member of the Rizal Provincial Board for the 2nd district in 2019
- Reynaldo Manuel (Independent), former candidate for member of the Rizal Provincial Board for the 1st district in 2019

=== Opinion polling ===
Fieldwork Date(s)	Pollster	Sample Size	MoE	Badajos PDSP	Bautista Ind.	Gatlabayan NPC	Guillergan Ind.	Manuel Ind.	Und./ None
Apr 21–28	South Luzon News Media	2,882	—	29.97	2.01	72.86	0.27	0.03	0.79
Mar 7–9	South Luzon News Media	544	—	29.8	2.6	60.7	0.6	0.7	5.7

=== Results ===
Rizal vice gubernatorial election
Party	Candidate	Votes	%
NPC	Pining Gatlabayan	600,553	64.00
Independent	Jojo Bautista	135,917	14.48
Independent	Reynaldo Manuel	84,388	8.99
PDSP	Imee Badajos	83,603	8.91
Independent	Gherry Guillergan	33,970	3.62
Valid ballots		938,431	73.58
Invalid or blank votes		337,021	26.42
Total votes		1,275,452	100.00
NPC gain from PFP			

Popular vote percentage
Pining Gatlabayan	64.00%
Jojo Bautista	14.48%
Reynaldo Manuel	8.99%
Imee Badajos	8.91%
Gherry Guillergan	3.62%

==== Per City/ Municipality ====
City/ Municipality	Imee Badajos		Jojo Bautista		Pining Gatlabayan		Gherry Guillergan		Reynaldo Manuel	
City/ Municipality	Votes	%	Votes	%	Votes	%	Votes	%	Votes	%
Angono	3,361	9.41	6,068	16.99	21,403	59.91	1,772	4.96	3,121	8.74
Antipolo	11,489	4.19	17,629	6.43	224,898	82.07	5,846	2.13	14,156	5.17
Baras	2,161	9.00	2,284	9.51	16,934	70.52	735	3.06	1,899	7.91
Binangonan	8,401	11.24	12,872	17.22	39,513	52.86	3,798	5.08	10,171	13.61
Cainta	10,642	11.38	16,241	17.36	51,539	55.09	4,773	5.10	10,361	11.07
Cardona	2,029	12.57	2,287	14.17	9,874	61.16	512	3.17	1,443	8.94
Jalajala	1,157	9.01	1,046	8.15	9,554	74.42	278	2.17	803	6.25
Morong	2,460	10.12	3,190	13.12	16,136	66.38	674	2.77	1,850	7.61
Pililla	3,276	14.01	2,323	9.93	14,424	61.69	825	3.53	2,535	10.84
Rodriguez	14,690	11.80	25,095	20.15	63,988	51.39	5,845	4.69	14,907	11.97
San Mateo	5,699	7.26	27,195	34.66	36,897	47.02	2,246	2.86	6,431	8.20
Tanay	4,703	11.83	4,053	10.20	24,895	62.62	1,613	4.06	4,490	11.29
Taytay	11,082	12.21	12,970	14.29	52,243	57.56	4,285	4.72	10,177	11.21
Teresa	2,453	9.37	2,664	10.17	18,255	69.72	768	2.93	2,044	7.81
TOTAL	83,603	8.91	135,917	14.48	600,553	64.00	33,970	3.62	84,388	8.99

== Congressional elections ==
=== First District ===
Incumbent first district representative Jack Duavit is term-limited. Mia Ynares, sister of Nina Ynares, is his party's nominee. Her opponents are political aspirant Anton Galias, businessman Jay Narciso, and businessman JB Pallasigue.

==== Candidates ====
- Anton Galias (PDR), political aspirant
- Jay Narciso (PDSP), businessman
- JB Pallasigue (Independent), businessman
- Mia Ynares (NPC), member of the Ynares family

==== Opinion polling ====
Fieldwork Date(s)	Pollster	Sample Size	MoE	Galias PDR	Narciso PDSP	Pallasigue Ind.	Ynares NPC	Und./ None
Apr 21–28	South Luzon News Media	505	—	8.11	1.38	37.02	50.69	2.77
Apr 19–24	Serbisyong Pilipinas	772	—	17.36	4.27	49.48	28.89	—
Mar 7–9	South Luzon News Media	315	—	4.7	9.1	4.7	78.1	1.9

==== Results ====
2025 Philippine House of Representatives election in Rizal's 1st district
Party	Candidate	Votes	%
NPC	Mia Ynares	255,258	72.03
Independent	JB Pallasigue	74,704	21.08
PDSP	Jay Narciso	14,343	4.05
Reporma	Anton Galias	10,050	2.84
Valid ballots		354,355	83.75
Invalid or blank votes		68,745	16.25
Total votes		423,100	100.00
NPC hold			

Popular vote percentage
Mia Ynares	72.03%
JB Pallasigue	21.08%
Jay Narciso	4.05%
Anton Galias	2.84%

===== Per Municipality =====
Municipality	Anton Galias		Jay Narciso		JB Pallasigue		Mia Ynares	
Municipality	Votes	%	Votes	%	Votes	%	Votes	%
Angono	1,168	2.72	1,708	3.98	9,906	23.10	30,101	70.19
Binangonan	2,696	2.90	3,990	4.29	19,097	20.55	67,145	72.25
Cainta	3,320	3.01	4,664	4.23	25,932	23.52	76,352	69.24
Taytay	2,866	2.65	3,981	3.68	19,769	18.26	81,660	75.42
TOTAL	10,050	2.84	14,343	4.05	74,704	21.08	255,258	72.03

=== Second District ===
==== Candidates ====
Dino Tanjuatco (NPC) is the incumbent. His opponent is Boy Mendiola.

==== Opinion polling ====
Fieldwork Date(s)	Pollster	Sample Size	MoE	Mendiola Ind.	Tanjuatco NPC	Und./ None
Apr 21–28	South Luzon News Media	633	—	17.06	80.88	2.05
Apr 19–24	Serbisyong Pilipinas	1,715	—	22.27	77.73	—
Mar 7–9	South Luzon News Media	962	—	4.3	94.5	1.2

==== Results ====
2025 Philippine House of Representatives election in Rizal's 2nd district
Party	Candidate	Votes	%
NPC	Dino Tanjuatco	182,212	85.95
Independent	Boy Mendiola	29,796	14.05
Valid ballots		212,008	88.49
Invalid or blank votes		27,566	11.51
Total votes		239,574	100.00
NPC hold			

Popular vote percentage
Dino Tanjuatco	85.95%
Boy Mendiola	14.05%

===== Per Municipality =====
Municipality	Boy Mendiola		Dino Tanjuatco	
Municipality	Votes	%	Votes	%
Baras	4,649	16.80	23,030	83.20
Cardona	2,391	10.25	20,925	89.75
Jalajala	2,645	14.87	15,147	85.13
Morong	6,885	22.35	23,926	77.65
Pililla	2,772	9.24	27,231	90.76
Tanay	4,663	9.03	46,999	90.97
Teresa	5,791	18.84	24,954	81.16

=== Third District ===
==== Opinion polling ====
Fieldwork Date(s)	Pollster	Sample Size	MoE	Diaz AKAY	Garcia NPC	Und./ None
Apr 21–28	South Luzon News Media	1,587	—	47.19	51.54	1.26
Apr 19–24	Serbisyong Pilipinas	4,795	—	52.53	47.47	—
Mar 7–9	South Luzon News Media	1,169	—	65.2	33.5	1.2

==== Results ====
2025 Philippine House of Representatives election in Rizal's 3rd district
Party	Candidate	Votes	%
NPC	Jojo Garcia	67,417	66.34
AKAY	Paeng Diaz	34,210	33.66
Valid ballots		101,627	94.85
Invalid or blank votes		5,520	5.15
Total votes		107,147	100.00
NPC hold			

Popular vote percentage
Jojo Garcia	66.34%
Paeng Diaz	33.66%

===== Per Barangay =====
Barangay	Paeng Diaz		Jojo Garcia	
Barangay	Votes	%	Votes	%
Ampid 1	3,185		6,856	
Ampid 2	862		1,761	
Banaba	3,200		6,058	
Dulong Bayan 1	949		1,985	
Dulong Bayan 2	1,210		3,154	
Guinayang	1,290		3,282	
Guitnang Bayan 1	2,946		8,297	
Guitnang Bayan 2	1,943		5,259	
Gulod Malaya	1,559		3,141	
Malanday	2,556		4,400	
Maly	2,593		3,921	
Pintong Bukawe	842		1,766	
Santa Ana	2,003		3,409	
Santo Niño	1,955		2,985	
Silangan	6,924		10,686	
TOTAL	34,210	33.66	67,417	66.34

=== Fourth District ===
==== Opinion polling ====
Fieldwork Date(s)	Pollster	Sample Size	MoE	Hernandez NPC	Nograles Lakas	Und./ None
Apr 21–28	South Luzon News Media	2,629	—	38.03	60.85	1.10
Apr 19–24	Serbisyong Pilipinas	3,288	—	38.96	61.04	—
Mar 7–9	South Luzon News Media	3,517	—	33.2	64.9	1.6

==== Results ====
2025 Philippine House of Representatives election in Rizal's 4th district
Party	Candidate	Votes	%
NPC	Tom Hernandez	87,659	52.28
Lakas	Fidel Nograles	80,004	47.72
Valid ballots		167,663	96.44
Invalid or blank votes		6,195	3.56
Total votes		173,858	100.00
NPC gain from Lakas			

Popular vote percentage
Tom Hernandez	52.28%
Fidel Nograles	47.72%

===== Per Barangay =====
Barangay	Tom Hernandez		Fidel Nograles	
Barangay	Votes	%	Votes	%
Balite				
Burgos				
Geronimo				
Macabud				
Manggahan				
Mascap				
Puray				
Rosario				
San Isidro				
San Jose				
San Rafael				

=== Antipolo's First District ===
==== Opinion polling ====
Fieldwork Date(s)	Pollster	Sample Size	MoE	Ampo WPP	Puno NUP	Relorcasa Ind.
Apr 19–24	Serbisyong Pilipinas	203	—	59.11	39.41	1.48

==== Results ====
2025 Philippine House of Representatives election in Antipolo's 1st district
Party	Candidate	Votes	%
NUP	Ronaldo Puno	119,885	87.30
Independent	Manuel Relorcasa	9,113	6.64
WPP	Sonia Ampo	8,332	6.07
Valid ballots		137,330	88.40
Invalid or blank votes		18,022	11.60
Total votes		155,352	100.00
NUP hold			

Popular vote percentage
Ronaldo Puno	87.30%
Manuel Relorcasa	6.64%
Sonia Ampo	6.07%

===== Per Barangay =====
Barangay	Sonia Ampo		Ronaldo Puno		Manuel Relorcasa	
Barangay	Votes	%	Votes	%	Votes	%
Bagong Nayon						
Beverly Hills						
Dela Paz						
Mambugan						
Mayamot						
Muntindilaw						
San Isidro						
Santa Cruz						

=== Antipolo's Second District ===
==== Results ====
2025 Philippine House of Representatives election in Antipolo's 2nd district
Party	Candidate	Votes	%
NUP	Romeo Acop	131,925	100.00
Valid ballots		131,925	74.78
Invalid or blank votes		44,496	25.22
Total votes		176,421	100.00
NUP hold			

Popular vote percentage
Romeo Acop	100.00%

===== Per Barangay =====
Barangay	Romeo Acop	
Barangay	Votes	%
Calawis		
Cupang		
Inarawan		
San Jose		
San Juan		
San Luis		
San Roque		

== Provincial board elections ==
All 4 Districts of Rizal and all 2 districts of Antipolo will elect members of the Rizal Provincial Board.

Party or alliance		Votes	%	Seats
Team Ynares	Nationalist People's Coalition	937,585	54.20	6
Team Ynares	Nacionalista Party	142,671	8.25	1
Team Ynares	National Unity Party	104,810	6.06	1
Team Ynares	Partido Federal ng Pilipinas	99,598	5.76	1
Team Ynares	Total	1,284,664	74.26	9
Partido Demokratiko Pilipino		44,974	2.60	1
Partido Federal ng Pilipinas		20,582	1.19	0
Independent		379,799	21.95	0
Ex officio seats				3
Reserved seats				1
Total		1,730,019	100.00	14

=== First District ===
- Municipalities: Angono, Binangonan, Cainta, Taytay

Rizal's 1st District board member election
Candidate	Party or alliance		Votes	%
Jestoni Alarcon	Team Ynares	Nationalist People's Coalition	248,389	58.71
Papoo Cruz	Team Ynares	Nationalist People's Coalition	183,628	43.40
Kay Ilagan-Conde	Team Ynares	Nationalist People's Coalition	179,113	42.33
Patnubay Tiamson	Team Ynares	Nacionalista Party	142,671	33.72
Edwin Cruz	Independent		100,147	23.67
Louie Dela Rosa	Independent		86,571	20.46
Jakz Mamba	Independent		37,525	8.87
Boy Agpalo	Independent		36,092	8.53
Joseph Huang	Independent		30,883	7.30
Total			1,045,019	100.00
Total votes			423,100	–
Registered voters/turnout			555,121	76.22
Source: Commission on Elections

=== Second District ===
- Municipalities: Baras, Cardona, Jala-Jala, Morong, Pililla, Tanay, Teresa

Rizal's 2nd District board member election
Candidate	Party or alliance		Votes	%
Boboy Bernados	Team Ynares	Nationalist People's Coalition	105,350	43.97
Reynaldo San Juan Jr.	Team Ynares	Partido Federal ng Pilipinas	99,598	41.57
Arturo Gimenez	Independent		29,786	12.43
Evan Daryll Aguelo	Independent		19,222	8.02
Total			253,956	100.00
Total votes			239,574	–
Registered voters/turnout			306,943	78.05
Source: Commission on Elections

=== Third District ===
- Municipality: San Mateo

Rizal's 3rd District board member election
Candidate	Party	Votes	%
John Patrick Bautista	Partido Demokratiko Pilipino	44,974	50.61
Philip Lustre	Partido Federal ng Pilipinas	20,582	23.16
Jancat Cataluña	Independent	14,836	16.69
Ariel Gutierrez	Independent	4,421	4.97
Abet Enriquez	Independent	4,058	4.57
Total		88,871	100.00
Total votes		107,147	–
Registered voters/turnout		134,335	79.76
PDP hold			
Source: Commission on Elections

=== Fourth District ===
- Municipality: Rodriguez (Montalban)

Rizal's 4th District board member election
Candidate	Party or alliance		Votes	%
Rafhael Ayuson	Team Ynares	Nationalist People's Coalition	102,159	74.48
Benjamin Pascual	Independent		18,592	13.55
Oliver Santos	Independent		8,549	6.23
Lot Pascua	Independent		7,863	5.73
Total			137,163	100.00
Total votes			173,858	–
Registered voters/turnout			219,447	79.23
NPC hold				
Source: Commission on Elections

=== Antipolo's First District ===
- Barangays: Bagong Nayon, Beverly Hills, Dela Paz, Mambugan, Mayamot, Muntingdilaw, Santa Cruz, San Isidro

Antipolo's 1st District board member election
Candidate	Party or alliance		Votes	%
Nick Puno	Team Ynares	National Unity Party (Philippines)	104,810	100.00
Total			104,810	100.00
Total votes			104,810	–
Registered voters/turnout			212,925	49.22
NUP hold				
Source: Commission on Elections

=== Antipolo's Second District ===
- Barangays: Calawis, Cupang, Dalig, Inarawan, San Luis, San Jose, San Juan, San Roque

Antipolo's 2nd District board member election
Candidate	Party or alliance		Votes	%
Nilo Leyble	Team Ynares	Nationalist People's Coalition	118,946	86.36
Emmanuel Yator	Independent		18,779	13.64
Total			137,725	100.00
Total votes			137,725	–
Registered voters/turnout			242,872	56.71
NPC hold				
Source: Commission on Elections

== City and municipal elections ==
All 13 municipalities of Rizal and the city of Antipolo will elect a mayor and a vice-mayor this election. The candidates for mayor and vice mayor with the highest number of votes wins the seat; they are voted separately, therefore, they may be of different parties when elected. Below is the list of mayoralty candidates of each city and municipalities per district.

=== 1st District ===
- Municipalities: Angono, Binangonan, Cainta, Taytay

==== Angono ====
Incumbent mayor Jeri Mae Calderon will be switching posts with her father, incumbent vice mayor Gerry Calderon. Gerry Calderon is running unopposed for mayor. If elected into office, this would be his seventh and second non-consecutive term.

Angono mayoral election
Party	Candidate	Votes	%
NPC	Gerry Calderon	41,048	100.00
Valid ballots		41,048	79.24
Invalid or blank votes		10,751	20.76
Total votes		51,799	100.00
NPC hold			

Incumbent vice mayor Gerry Calderon will be switching posts with his daughter, incumbent mayor Jeri Mae Calderon. Jeri Mae Calderon is running unopposed for vice mayor.

Angono vice mayoral election
Party	Candidate	Votes	%
NPC	Jeri Mae Calderon	40,054	100.00
Valid ballots		40,054	77.33
Invalid or blank votes		11,745	22.67
Total votes		51,799	100.00
NPC hold			

Angono sangguniang bayan election
Candidate	Party or alliance		Votes	%
Jo Anne Saguinsin	Barkadahan ng Masa	Nationalist People's Coalition	32,240	62.24
Arvin Villamayor	Barkadahan ng Masa	Nationalist People's Coalition	32,030	61.84
Jhoana Duran	Partido Federal ng Pilipinas		26,286	50.75
Watanabe Dela Cruz	Barkadahan ng Masa	Nationalist People's Coalition	26,273	50.72
Edsel Reyes	Barkadahan ng Masa	Nationalist People's Coalition	25,004	48.27
Matthew Lagaya	Barkadahan ng Masa	Nationalist People's Coalition	24,867	48.01
Bryan Cruz	Barkadahan ng Masa	Nationalist People's Coalition	24,370	47.05
Toto Hernandez	Barkadahan ng Masa	Nationalist People's Coalition	23,914	46.17
Elena Ibañez	Barkadahan ng Masa	Nationalist People's Coalition	20,802	40.16
Tintin Mesias	Independent		16,300	31.47
Bernard Forbes	Independent		14,967	28.89
Jam Guevara	Independent		12,428	23.99
Alvin Benipayo	Independent		6,545	12.64
Joseph Derilo	Independent		4,923	9.50
Total			290,949	100.00
Total votes			51,799	–
Registered voters/turnout			70,071	73.92
Source: Commission on Elections

==== Binangonan ====
Incumbent mayor Cesar Ynares is term-limited. His niece, who is also incumbent vice mayor Boyet Ynares' daughter, Rhea Ynares, is seeking to replace his position. Rhea Ynares is running unopposed for mayor. If elected into office, she would be the first female mayor of Binangonan.

Binangonan mayoral election
Party	Candidate	Votes	%
NPC	Rhea Ynares	82,101	100.00
Valid ballots		82,101	73.67
Invalid or blank votes		29,344	26.33
Total votes		111,445	100.00
NPC hold			

Incumbent vice mayor Boyet Ynares is term-limited. His nephew, who is also incumbent mayor Cesar Ynares' son, Russel Ynares, is seeking to replace his position. Russel Ynares is running unopposed for vice mayor.

Binangonan vice mayoral election
Party	Candidate	Votes	%
NPC	Russel Ynares	78,066	100.00
Valid ballots		78,066	70.05
Invalid or blank votes		33,379	29.95
Total votes		111,445	100.00
NPC hold			

Binangonan sangguniang bayan election
Candidate	Party or alliance		Votes	%
Coco Antiporda	Independent		48,631	43.64
Lito Dela Cuesta	Team Barkadahan	Nationalist People's Coalition	46,957	42.13
Tingting Cerda	Team Barkadahan	Nationalist People's Coalition	40,511	36.35
Bien Ojeda	Team Barkadahan	Nationalist People's Coalition	38,525	34.57
Linggit Rivera	Independent		36,696	32.93
Ruben Magdalena	Team Barkadahan	Nationalist People's Coalition	36,444	32.70
Boy Cequeña	Team Barkadahan	Nationalist People's Coalition	34,923	31.34
Jane Apostadero	Independent		31,707	28.45
Rey Punelas	Independent		31,188	27.99
Nick Del Mundo	Team Barkadahan	Nationalist People's Coalition	30,981	27.80
Pol Mendoza	Team Barkadahan	Nationalist People's Coalition	30,756	27.60
Choneck Añonuevo	Independent		30,023	26.94
Vergel Celebre	Team Barkadahan	Nationalist People's Coalition	27,890	25.03
Jake Antrajenda	Independent		25,591	22.96
Joseph Callanta	Independent		24,456	21.94
Jerome Antiporda	Independent		21,418	19.22
Mike Mendoza	Independent		14,868	13.34
Thed Gondra	Independent		12,958	11.63
Jovy Garcia	Independent		12,207	10.95
Rommel Fermin	Independent		10,285	9.23
Wise Garcia	Independent		9,934	8.91
Anoy Figueroa	Independent		6,506	5.84
Total			603,455	100.00
Total votes			111,445	–
Registered voters/turnout			145,638	76.52
Source: Commission on Elections

==== Cainta ====
Incumbent mayor Elen Nieto is eligible to run for a second term but made way for her husband, Kit Nieto, to stage a comeback as mayor of Cainta. Kit Nieto is running unopposed for mayor. If elected into office, this would be his fourth and first non-consecutive term.

Cainta mayoral election
Party	Candidate	Votes	%
NPC	Kit Nieto	118,965	100.00
Valid ballots		118,965	90.40
Invalid or blank votes		12,637	9.60
Total votes		131,602	100.00
NPC hold			

Incumbent vice mayor Ace Servillion is seeking to be reelected for a third and final term. Colonel Valencia, an independent candidate, is seeking to challenge his reelection bid.

Cainta vice mayoral election
Party	Candidate	Votes	%
NPC	Ace Servillion	96,913	81.38
Independent	Colonel Valencia	22,174	18.62
Valid ballots		119,087	90.49
Invalid or blank votes		12,515	9.51
Total votes		131,602	100.00
NPC hold			

Cainta sangguniang bayan election
Candidate	Party or alliance		Votes	%
Willy Felix	One Cainta	Nationalist People's Coalition	90,187	68.53
Ekeng Tajuna	One Cainta	Nationalist People's Coalition	83,787	63.67
Sharon Garcia	One Cainta	Nationalist People's Coalition	73,765	56.05
Manny Jacob	One Cainta	Nationalist People's Coalition	73,330	55.72
Snooky Malicdem	One Cainta	Nationalist People's Coalition	69,419	52.75
Buboy Sauro	One Cainta	Nationalist People's Coalition	65,102	49.47
Romboy San Juan	One Cainta	Nationalist People's Coalition	61,130	46.45
Aisa Kiram	One Cainta	Nationalist People's Coalition	55,478	42.16
Charles Almodovar	Akay National Political Party		47,046	35.75
Bradley Bajas	Independent		31,299	23.78
Archie Melano	Independent		26,116	19.84
David Cabawatan	Independent		25,367	19.28
Total			702,026	100.00
Total votes			131,602	–
Registered voters/turnout			177,532	74.13
Source: Commission on Elections

==== Taytay ====
Incumbent mayor Allan De Leon is seeking reelection for a second term. Former mayor Joric Gacula, who was defeated back in 2022 by Allan De Leon in a landslide victory, is staging a comeback as mayor of Taytay. If elected into office, this would be his sixth and second non-consecutive term. Another candidate in the running is independent candidate Marilyn Marundan.

Taytay mayoral election
Party	Candidate	Votes	%
NPC	Allan De Leon	85,348	68.49
PFP	Joric Gacula	36,974	29.67
Independent	Marilyn Marundan	2,283	1.83
Valid ballots		124,605	97.15
Invalid or blank votes		3,649	2.82
Total votes		128,254	100.00
NPC hold			

Incumbent vice mayor Pia Cabral, who is the former running mate of Allan De Leon, is seeking reelection for a second term under an independent slate. In her place, Allan De Leon chose incumbent councilor JV Cabitac as his running mate. Also in the running is incumbent councilor Jeca Villanueva, who is the running mate of Joric Gacula. Filipina Angeles, an independent candidate, is seeking to challenge their election bids.

Taytay vice mayoral election
Party	Candidate	Votes	%
NPC	JV Cabitac	55,134	45.17
Lakas	Pia Cabral	35,534	29.11
PFP	Jeca Villanueva	29,561	24.22
Independent	Filipina Angeles	1,822	1.49
Valid ballots		122,051	95.16
Invalid or blank votes		6,203	4.84
Total votes		128,254	100.00
NPC gain from Lakas			

Taytay sangguniang bayan election
Candidate	Party or alliance		Votes	%
Joan Calderon	Smile Taytay	Nationalist People's Coalition	65,067	50.73
JV Valera	Smile Taytay	Nationalist People's Coalition	64,155	50.02
Boknay Leonardo	Smile Taytay	Nationalist People's Coalition	63,819	49.76
Patrick Alcantara	Smile Taytay	Nationalist People's Coalition	60,626	47.27
Cai Cortez	Smile Taytay	Nationalist People's Coalition	58,265	45.43
Tobit Cruz	Akbayan		54,966	42.86
Mitch Bermundo	Nagkakaisang Taytay	Partido Federal ng Pilipinas	50,707	39.54
Kiko Esguerra	Smile Taytay	Nationalist People's Coalition	50,610	39.46
Ninay Mercado	Smile Taytay	Nationalist People's Coalition	43,277	33.74
Tak Faeldon Diño	Smile Taytay	Nationalist People's Coalition	42,223	32.92
Archie Calderon	Nagkakaisang Taytay	Partido Federal ng Pilipinas	40,732	31.76
Arky Manning	Panalong Taytay	Partido Demokratiko Pilipino	29,395	22.92
Tegan Cayton	Nagkakaisang Taytay	Partido Federal ng Pilipinas	19,977	15.58
Manet Gonzaga	Nagkakaisang Taytay	Partido Federal ng Pilipinas	19,424	15.14
Eljun Victor	Panalong Taytay	PROMDI	17,693	13.80
Gerick Francisco	Nagkakaisang Taytay	Partido Federal ng Pilipinas	17,688	13.79
Bonggit Jurado	Nagkakaisang Taytay	Partido Federal ng Pilipinas	16,005	12.48
Gerald Cruz	Nagkakaisang Taytay	Partido Federal ng Pilipinas	15,224	11.87
Chesca Persia	Katipunan ng Nagkakaisang Pilipino		14,735	11.49
Allyson Lopez	Nagkakaisang Taytay	Partido Federal ng Pilipinas	13,167	10.27
Rhoneil De Leon	Independent		7,592	5.92
Erwin Diego	Independent		5,969	4.65
Jun Laguna	Independent		5,941	4.63
Gino Celerian	Panalong Taytay	Aksyon Demokratiko	5,392	4.20
Nora Baccay	Independent		4,901	3.82
Mike Sorela	Panalong Taytay	PROMDI	4,826	3.76
Teresa Santos	Independent		4,458	3.48
Helen Berbaño	Independent		3,691	2.88
Ranilo Florendo	Independent		3,383	2.64
Victoria Palenzuela	Independent		3,064	2.39
Millet Anghag	Independent		2,995	2.34
Otilia Bonillo	Independent		2,484	1.94
Total			812,451	100.00
Total votes			128,254	–
Registered voters/turnout			161,880	79.23
Source: Commission on Elections

=== 2nd District ===
- Municipalities: Baras, Cardona, Jalajala, Morong, Pililla, Tanay, Teresa

==== Baras ====
Incumbent mayor Willy Robles is seeking reelection for a fifth term. Perla Tesoro, who is the niece of former mayor Meliton Geronimo, is seeking to challenge the Robles clan's two-decade-long rule over Baras. Also in the running is independent candidate Crisostomo Dilidili.

Baras mayoral election
Party	Candidate	Votes	%
NPC	Willy Robles	21,689	70.00
Liberal	Perla Tesoro	8,255	26.64
Independent	Crisostomo Dilidili	1,041	3.36
Valid ballots		30,985	93.87
Invalid or blank votes		2,022	6.13
Total votes		33,007	100.00
NPC hold			

Incumbent vice mayor KC Robles is seeking reelection for a second term. Jay Sambilay, the running mate of Perla Tesoro, is seeking to challenge her reelection bid. Also in the running is independent candidate Carlos Juson.

Baras vice mayoral election
Party	Candidate	Votes	%
NPC	KC Robles	23,725	79.89
Liberal	Jay Sambilay	4,256	14.33
Independent	Carlos Juson	1,716	5.78
Valid ballots		29,697	89.97
Invalid or blank votes		3,310	10.03
Total votes		33,007	100.00
NPC hold			

Baras sangguniang bayan election
Candidate	Party or alliance		Votes	%
Hector Robles	Team Willy	Nationalist People's Coalition	16,786	50.86
Verbalot Robles	Team Willy	Nationalist People's Coalition	14,704	44.55
Peter Leo Robles	Team Willy	Nationalist People's Coalition	14,181	42.96
Carlo Llagas	Team Perla	United Nationalist Alliance	14,151	42.87
Jovita Cawicaan	Team Willy	Nationalist People's Coalition	14,135	42.82
Bien Garrovillas	Team Willy	Nationalist People's Coalition	12,198	36.96
Emman Olaño	Team Willy	Nationalist People's Coalition	11,187	33.89
Nato Llagas	Team Perla	United Nationalist Alliance	11,145	33.77
Jojo Elago	Team Perla	United Nationalist Alliance	10,363	31.40
Marvin Venus	Team Perla	Liberal Party	10,103	30.61
Roberto Cabandong	Team Willy	Nationalist People's Coalition	9,020	27.33
Pango Robles	Team Perla	Liberal Party	8,527	25.83
Hermy Estrabo	Team Willy	Nationalist People's Coalition	8,483	25.70
Kabisig Santos	Team Perla	Liberal Party	6,020	18.24
Dadies Matamis	Team Perla	Liberal Party	4,877	14.78
Marwin Cabandong	Independent		4,752	14.40
Bastian Vallestero	Team Perla	Liberal Party	4,469	13.54
Rod Acleta	Independent		2,927	8.87
Jerry Balistoy	Independent		2,522	7.64
Arnel Leonor	Independent		2,323	7.04
Danny Fernandez	Workers' and Peasants' Party		2,256	6.83
Emerlito De Leon	Independent		2,197	6.66
Eladio Bachicha Jr.	Independent		1,588	4.81
Renante Manla	Independent		1,522	4.61
Uldarico Surigao	Independent		1,158	3.51
Lindio Patulilic	Independent		1,118	3.39
Total			192,712	100.00
Total votes			33,007	–
Registered voters/turnout			50,015	65.99
Source: Commission on Elections

==== Cardona ====
Incumbent mayor Jun San Juan is seeking reelection for a fifth term. Former mayor Totoy Campo, who was defeated in 2022 by Jun San Juan in a landslide victory, is staging a comeback as mayor of Cardona. If elected into office, this would be his second term. Also in the running is independent candidate Nonie Ramirez.

Cardona mayoral election
Party	Candidate	Votes	%
NPC	Jun San Juan	13,883	55.12
PFP	Totoy Campo	10,319	40.97
Independent	Nonie Ramirez	983	3.90
Valid ballots		25,185	95.26
Invalid or blank votes		1,252	4.74
Total votes		26,437	100.00
NPC hold			

Incumbent vice mayor Gildok Pandac is seeking reelection for a third and final term. Incumbent councilor John Dee Bautista, who is the running mate of Totoy Campo, is seeking to challenge his reelection bid.

Cardona vice mayoral election
Party	Candidate	Votes	%
Lakas	Gildok Pandac	14,522	60.33
Aksyon	John Dee Bautista	9,550	39.67
Valid ballots		24,072	91.05
Invalid or blank votes		2,365	8.95
Total votes		26,437	100.00
Lakas hold			

Cardona sangguniang bayan election
Candidate	Party or alliance		Votes	%
Jeff Campo	Team REPA	Nationalist People's Coalition	12,550	47.47
Deyong San Jose	Team Ayos	Partido Federal ng Pilipinas	12,436	47.04
Jarlem Rivera	Team REPA	Nationalist People's Coalition	12,107	45.80
John Santiago	Team Ayos	Partido Federal ng Pilipinas	11,860	44.86
Papo Reyes	Team REPA	Nationalist People's Coalition	10,827	40.95
Tommy Anselmo	Team REPA	Nationalist People's Coalition	10,494	39.69
Alex Dionisio	Team Ayos	Aksyon Demokratiko	10,140	38.36
Boyet Subida	Team REPA	Nationalist People's Coalition	10,134	38.33
EJ Abarico	Team Ayos	Partido Federal ng Pilipinas	10,043	37.99
Blondel Francisco	Team REPA	Nationalist People's Coalition	9,931	37.56
Mising Natividad	Team REPA	Nationalist People's Coalition	9,185	34.74
Miel Sta Ana	Team Ayos	Aksyon Demokratiko	8,888	33.62
Andoy Estrella	Team Ayos	Aksyon Demokratiko	7,891	29.85
Noel Reyes	Team Ayos	Aksyon Demokratiko	7,434	28.12
Ron Pasay	Team REPA	Nationalist People's Coalition	7,082	26.79
Tito Francisco	Independent		4,242	16.05
Oca Friginal	Team Ayos	Partido Federal ng Pilipinas	3,989	15.09
Total			159,233	100.00
Total votes			26,437	–
Registered voters/turnout			32,340	81.75
Source: Commission on Elections

==== Jalajala ====
Incumbent mayor Elmer Pillas is running for reelection for a third and final term. His former running mate and incumbent vice mayor Harry Añago is seeking to challenge his reelection bid.

Jalajala mayoral election
Party	Candidate	Votes	%
PFP	Harry Añago	11,524	56.83
NPC	Elmer Pillas	8,755	43.17
Valid ballots		20,279	98.48
Invalid or blank votes		314	1.52
Total votes		20,593	100.00
PFP gain from NPC			

Incumbent vice mayor Harry Añago, instead of running for a second term, ran for the mayoralty instead. In his place, he chose incumbent councilor Matet Villaran as his running mate for vice mayor. Elmer Pillas, Harry Añago's former running mate, chose Ramil Escarmosa as his running mate.

Jalajala vice mayoral election
Party	Candidate	Votes	%
KANP	Ramil Escarmosa	10,936	55.02
Liberal	Matet Villaran	8,942	44.98
Valid ballots		19,878	96.53
Invalid or blank votes		715	3.47
Total votes		20,593	100.00
KANP gain from PFP			

Jalajala sangguniang bayan election
Candidate	Party or alliance		Votes	%
Narcing Villaran	Alagang Añago	Akbayan	9,174	44.55
Benok Bonita	Alagang Añago	Partido Federal ng Pilipinas	8,556	41.55
Jojo Pillas	Team Pillas-Escarmosa	Nationalist People's Coalition	8,498	41.27
Clemente Relon	Team Pillas-Escarmosa	Katipunan ng Nagkakaisang Pilipino	8,325	40.43
Charlott Angeles	Alagang Añago	Akbayan	8,279	40.20
Muklo Estrella	Team Pillas-Escarmosa	Nationalist People's Coalition	8,243	40.03
Racky Dumandan	Alagang Añago	Partido Federal ng Pilipinas	8,151	39.58
Randy Delos Santos	Team Pillas-Escarmosa	Katipunan ng Nagkakaisang Pilipino	8,149	39.57
Billy De Leon	Alagang Añago	Liberal Party	8,022	38.95
Jordan Belleza	Alagang Añago	Partido Federal ng Pilipinas	7,815	37.95
Greg Manguiat	Team Pillas-Escarmosa	Nationalist People's Coalition	7,699	37.39
Jimmy Mariano	Team Pillas-Escarmosa	Nationalist People's Coalition	7,521	36.52
Poroy Candelaria	Team Pillas-Escarmosa	Katipunan ng Nagkakaisang Pilipino	7,479	36.32
Boyet Delos Santos	Alagang Añago	Liberal Party	7,424	36.05
Alexis Perez	Team Pillas-Escarmosa	Katipunan ng Nagkakaisang Pilipino	7,384	35.86
Jun Panguito	Alagang Añago	Akbayan	6,816	33.10
Manuel Arriola	Independent		2,950	14.33
Rico Nimeno	Independent		2,389	11.60
Romeo Dongeto	Lakas–CMD		1,960	9.52
Total			134,834	100.00
Total votes			20,593	–
Registered voters/turnout			23,709	86.86
Source: Commission on Elections

==== Morong ====
Incumbent mayor Sidney Soriano is seeking reelection for a second term. Incumbent vice mayor Jonjon Feliciano, who is Sidney Soriano's former running mate, is seeking to challenge his reelection bid.

Morong mayoral election
Party	Candidate	Votes	%
NPC	Sidney Soriano	20,274	60.70
PFP	Jonjon Feliciano	13,125	39.30
Valid ballots		33,399	96.72
Invalid or blank votes		1,132	3.28
Total votes		34,531	100.00
NPC hold			

Incumbent vice mayor Jonjon Feliciano, instead of vying for a second term as vice mayor, chose to seek the mayoralty instead. In his place, he chose incumbent councilor Oca Pantaleon as his running mate. Sidney Soriano then chose incumbent councilor Joeven Condez as his running mate for the vice mayoralty.

Morong vice mayoral election
Party	Candidate	Votes	%
NPC	Joeven Condez	16,922	53.93
PFP	Oca Pantaleon	14,454	46.07
Valid ballots		31,376	90.86
Invalid or blank votes		3,155	9.14
Total votes		34,531	100.00
NPC gain from PFP			

Morong sangguniang bayan election
Candidate	Party or alliance		Votes	%
Radney San Luis	Team Soriano-Condez	Nationalist People's Coalition	16,900	48.94
Harold Pascual	Team Soriano-Condez	Nationalist People's Coalition	15,740	45.58
Matt Sy	Team BFF	Partido Federal ng Pilipinas	14,856	43.02
Pidiong San Juan	Team Soriano-Condez	Nationalist People's Coalition	14,355	41.57
Leonardo Pantaleon	Team Soriano-Condez	Nationalist People's Coalition	14,193	41.10
Mao Archie Pascual	Team Soriano-Condez	Nationalist People's Coalition	13,511	39.13
Felix Marcelino	Team Soriano-Condez	Nationalist People's Coalition	12,976	37.58
Tolindoy Abary	Team Soriano-Condez	Nationalist People's Coalition	12,964	37.54
Bert De Leon	Team Soriano-Condez	Nationalist People's Coalition	12,251	35.48
Cesar Javier	Team BFF	Partido Federal ng Pilipinas	11,541	33.42
Wawin Cateria	Team BFF	Partido Federal ng Pilipinas	10,673	30.91
Dennis Talanay	Team BFF	Partido Federal ng Pilipinas	8,953	25.93
Ricky Inguito	Team BFF	Partido Federal ng Pilipinas	8,362	24.22
Galunggong Halimao	Team BFF	Partido Federal ng Pilipinas	8,152	23.61
Junjun San Juan	Team BFF	Partido Federal ng Pilipinas	7,968	23.07
Rod Garrovillas	Independent		7,714	22.34
Romel Sarmiento	Team BFF	Partido Federal ng Pilipinas	5,063	14.66
Ruben Espiritu Santo	Independent		3,934	11.39
Total			200,106	100.00
Total votes			34,531	–
Registered voters/turnout			41,727	82.75
Source: Commission on Elections

==== Pililla ====
Incumbent mayor Dan Masinsin is term-limited and is ineligible to run for reelection. In his place, he chose his son John Masinsin to succeed him. Incumbent vice mayor Jaime Paz, who is eligible to run for a second term as vice mayor, chose to run for the mayoralty instead. Another contender for the mayoralty is former It's Showtime director and incumbent councilor Bobet Vidanes. Several candidates are also vying for the mayoralty, such as former councilor Ronnie Bias and independent candidate Joselito Aquino.

Pililla mayoral election
Party	Candidate	Votes	%
KANP	John Masinsin	18,000	55.66
NPC	Jaime Paz	10,939	33.83
Lakas	Bobet Vidanes	2,393	7.40
Independent	Joselito Aquino	615	1.90
PFP	Ronnie Bias	390	1.21
Valid ballots		32,337	97.19
Invalid or blank votes		935	2.81
Total votes		33,272	100.00
KANP hold			

Incumbent vice mayor Jaime Paz, who is eligible to run for reelection for a second term, opted to run for mayor instead. In his place, he chose incumbent councilor Manuel Paz as his running mate. Incumbent mayor Dan Masinsin, who has served as mayor for nine years and is now term-limited, has opted to run for vice mayor. Several candidates are also vying for the vice mayoralty such as PFP candidate Maria Malavega, Bobet Vidanes' running mate Abraham Mardi Dikit, and Joselito Aquino's running mate Leonardo Aquino.

Pililla vice mayoral election
Party	Candidate	Votes	%
KANP	Dan Masinsin	18,880	59.31
NPC	Manuel Paz	6,750	21.21
Independent	Abraham Mardi Dikit	4,473	14.05
Independent	Leonardo Aquino	1,166	3.66
PFP	Maria Malavega	562	1.77
Valid ballots		31,831	95.67
Invalid or blank votes		1,441	4.33
Total votes		33,272	100.00
KANP gain from NPC			

Pililla sangguniang bayan election
Candidate	Party or alliance		Votes	%
Dindo Abueg	Team Better Pililla	Katipunan ng Nagkakaisang Pilipino	16,105	48.40
Ruel Masinsin	Team Better Pililla	Katipunan ng Nagkakaisang Pilipino	14,336	43.09
Jake Anero	Team Better Pililla	Katipunan ng Nagkakaisang Pilipino	14,141	42.50
Bryan Paz De Leon	Team Better Pililla	Katipunan ng Nagkakaisang Pilipino	13,540	40.69
Jordan Olea	Team Better Pililla	Katipunan ng Nagkakaisang Pilipino	12,409	37.30
Lena Benavidez	Team Paz-Paz	Nationalist People's Coalition	11,223	33.73
Rafael Carpio	Team Better Pililla	Katipunan ng Nagkakaisang Pilipino	10,614	31.90
Yves Johncel Bermudez	Team Better Pililla	Katipunan ng Nagkakaisang Pilipino	9,993	30.03
Josie Mahupil	Team Better Pililla	Katipunan ng Nagkakaisang Pilipino	9,644	28.99
Patrick Masikip	Team Paz-Paz	Nationalist People's Coalition	8,524	25.62
Rundolph Abalos	Team Paz-Paz	Nationalist People's Coalition	8,291	24.92
Nico Patenia	Team Paz-Paz	Nationalist People's Coalition	8,121	24.41
John Kenneth De Leon	Team Paz-Paz	Nationalist People's Coalition	7,653	23.00
Edwin Buenaventura	Team Paz-Paz	Nationalist People's Coalition	6,410	19.27
Willy Castelo	Team Paz-Paz	Nationalist People's Coalition	6,132	18.43
Glenn Tibay	We Are Happy KaPililla	Independent	5,688	17.10
Randy Castejon	Team Paz-Paz	Nationalist People's Coalition	4,362	13.11
Vio De Leon	We Are Happy KaPililla	Independent	4,299	12.92
Ching Patenia	We Are Happy KaPililla	Independent	3,667	11.02
Alex Montoya	Independent		3,645	10.96
FM De La Cruz	We Are Happy KaPililla	Independent	3,604	10.83
Joel Vidanes	We Are Happy KaPililla	Independent	3,484	10.47
Gerson Matulin	Team Bias-Malavega	Partido Federal ng Pilipinas	3,122	9.38
Don Montealegre	We Are Happy KaPililla	Independent	2,653	7.97
Nenita Buenaventura	Team Bias-Malavega	Partido Federal ng Pilipinas	2,552	7.67
Bob Talavera	Independent		2,497	7.50
Shane Galino	We Are Happy KaPililla	Independent	2,100	6.31
Raymond Angeles	Team Bias-Malavega	Independent	2,051	6.16
Noel Corpuz	Team Bias-Malavega	Partido Federal ng Pilipinas	1,858	5.58
Ewek Castelo	We Are Happy KaPililla	Independent	1,762	5.30
Alma Viray	Team Aquino	Independent	1,740	5.23
Maurice Dulay	Team Bias-Malavega	Partido Federal ng Pilipinas	1,326	3.99
Dennis Bias	Team Bias-Malavega	Partido Federal ng Pilipinas	1,154	3.47
Arceli Guinto	Team Bias-Malavega	Partido Federal ng Pilipinas	1,066	3.20
Romy Escavillas	Team Aquino	Independent	770	2.31
Butch Petronio	Independent		724	2.18
Gerry Cacho	Team Bias-Malavega	Partido Federal ng Pilipinas	656	1.97
Jenilyn Liangco	Team Aquino	Independent	607	1.82
Aniano Gimena	Partido Federal ng Pilipinas		522	1.57
Jun Ferrer	Independent		454	1.36
Total			213,499	100.00
Total votes			33,272	–
Registered voters/turnout			40,376	82.41
Source: Commission on Elections

==== Tanay ====
Incumbent mayor Lito Tanjuatco is eligible to run for a seventh term but made way for his son, RM Tanjuatco, to stage a comeback as mayor of Tanay. If elected into office, this would be his third and first non-consecutive term. Former MDRRMO officer Carlos Inofre, who was defeated back in 2022 by Lito Tanjuatco, is seeking to challenge RM Tanjuatco's bid for the mayoralty.

Tanay mayoral election
Party	Candidate	Votes	%
NPC	RM Tanjuatco	38,695	74.31
PFP	Carlos Inofre	13,378	25.69
Valid ballots		52,073	93.07
Invalid or blank votes		3,877	6.93
Total votes		55,950	100.00
NPC hold			

Incumbent vice mayor RM Tanjuatco is seeking to replace his father, incumbent mayor Lito Tanjuatco, as the mayor of Tanay. In his place, he chose incumbent councilor Allan Sacramento as his running mate. Julito Berdan, the running mate of Carlos Inofre, is seeking to challenge his election bid. Also in the running is former board member and LNMB Rizal province president Ruel Estrella.

Tanay vice mayoral election
Party	Candidate	Votes	%
KBL	Ruel Estrella	27,271	51.72
NPC	Allan Sacramento	22,975	43.58
PFP	Julito Berdan	2,478	4.70
Valid ballots		52,724	94.23
Invalid or blank votes		3,226	5.77
Total votes		55,950	100.00
KBL gain from NPC			

Tanay sangguniang bayan election
Candidate	Party or alliance		Votes	%
Joy Tica	Team Tanay	Nationalist People's Coalition	26,584	47.51
Gina Berdan	Independent		25,466	45.52
Bong Ocampo	Team Tanay	Nationalist People's Coalition	23,744	42.44
Gel Pitoral	Team Tanay	Nationalist People's Coalition	22,237	39.74
Itchie Vergel De Dios	Team Tanay	Nationalist People's Coalition	20,818	37.21
Roger Catalos	Team Tanay	Nationalist People's Coalition	20,811	37.20
Harold Catameo	Alagang PAMbayan	Kilusang Bagong Lipunan	20,066	35.86
Lala De Guzman	Team Tanay	Nationalist People's Coalition	20,030	35.80
Iver Gaston	Alagang PAMbayan	Kilusang Bagong Lipunan	19,568	34.97
Aron Guerrero	Team Tanay	Nationalist People's Coalition	18,861	33.71
Rambulls Magwili	Team Tanay	Nationalist People's Coalition	17,902	32.00
Pilo Tongohan	Team One Tanay	Partido Federal ng Pilipinas	14,782	26.42
Rafael Reyes	Alagang PAMbayan	Kilusang Bagong Lipunan	14,576	26.05
Omex Solano	Alagang PAMbayan	Kilusang Bagong Lipunan	12,761	22.81
Ato Baquiran	Alagang PAMbayan	Kilusang Bagong Lipunan	11,610	20.75
Maok Lacsina	Alagang PAMbayan	Kilusang Bagong Lipunan	10,411	18.61
Orly Pelaez	Alagang PAMbayan	Kilusang Bagong Lipunan	8,452	15.11
Arvin Vista	Independent		7,271	13.00
Ryan Hosseini	Alagang PAMbayan	Kilusang Bagong Lipunan	6,952	12.43
Enchong Santos	Team One Tanay	Partido Federal ng Pilipinas	4,910	8.78
Angelica Jovelle Vicente	Team One Tanay	Partido Federal ng Pilipinas	3,846	6.87
Amelia Tiburcio	Independent		1,580	2.82
Total			333,238	100.00
Total votes			55,950	–
Registered voters/turnout			71,870	77.85
Source: Commission on Elections

==== Teresa ====
Incumbent mayor Rodel Dela Cruz is seeking reelection for a second term and is running unopposed.

Teresa mayoral election
Party	Candidate	Votes	%
NPC	Rodel Dela Cruz	29,772	100.00
Valid ballots		29,772	83.2
Invalid or blank votes		6,012	16.8
Total votes		35,784	100.00
NPC hold			

Incumbent vice mayor Freddie Bonifacio is seeking reelection for a second term and is running unopposed.

Teresa vice mayoral election
Party	Candidate	Votes	%
NPC	Freddie Bonifacio	27,839	100.00
Valid ballots		27,839	77.8
Invalid or blank votes		7,945	22.2
Total votes		35,784	100.00
NPC hold			

Teresa sangguniang bayan election
Candidate	Party or alliance		Votes	%
Jeck Pascual	Independent		24,188	67.59
Bang Marcelino	Independent		20,459	57.17
Nanang Dela Cruz	Team Dela Cruz-Bonifacio	Nationalist People's Coalition	19,194	53.64
Niño Damaso	Independent		18,500	51.70
Joker Santos	Team Dela Cruz-Bonifacio	Nationalist People's Coalition	17,574	49.11
Juvith Sto Tomas	Independent		17,166	47.97
Buboy Selibio	Team Dela Cruz-Bonifacio	Lakas–CMD	16,395	45.82
Joshua San Jose	Team Dela Cruz-Bonifacio	Liberal Party	15,907	44.45
Bong Santiago	Team Dela Cruz-Bonifacio	Liberal Party	15,868	44.34
Estong San Jose	Team Dela Cruz-Bonifacio	Nationalist People's Coalition	13,441	37.56
Macky Lopez	Team Dela Cruz-Bonifacio	Lakas–CMD	12,376	34.59
Agila Fullente	Team Dela Cruz-Bonifacio	Nationalist People's Coalition	12,130	33.90
Total			203,198	100.00
Total votes			35,784	–
Registered voters/turnout			46,906	76.29
Source: Commission on Elections

=== 3rd District ===
- Municipality: San Mateo

==== San Mateo ====
Incumbent mayor Omie Rivera is seeking reelection for a second term. Incumbent councilor Denzel Diaz, who is the son of former mayor Denzel Diaz, is seeking to challenge his reelection bid. Also in the running is Guitnang Bayan 1 barangay captain Jomer Cruz.

San Mateo mayoral election
Party	Candidate	Votes	%
Liberal	Omie Rivera	59,491	57.86
AKAY	Denzel Diaz	28,722	27.94
Independent	Jomer Cruz	14,601	14.20
Valid ballots		102,814	95.96
Invalid or blank votes		4,333	4.04
Total votes		107,147	100.00
Liberal hold			

Incumbent vice mayor Jimmy Roxas is seeking reelection for a second term. Incumbent councilor Cristeo Cruz, who is the running mate of Denzel Diaz, is seeking to challenge his reelection bid.

San Mateo vice mayoral election
Party	Candidate	Votes	%
NPC	Jimmy Roxas	65,848	68.96
AKAY	Cristeo Cruz	29,641	31.04
Valid ballots		95,489	89.12
Invalid or blank votes		11,658	10.88
Total votes		107,147	100.00
NPC hold			

San Mateo sangguniang bayan election
Candidate	Party or alliance		Votes	%
Boy Salen	Team I Love San Mateo	Nationalist People's Coalition	57,543	53.70
Grace Diaz	Team I Love San Mateo	Nationalist People's Coalition	52,720	49.20
Noel Sta Maria	Team I Love San Mateo	Nationalist People's Coalition	49,553	46.25
Nelson Antonio	Team I Love San Mateo	Nationalist People's Coalition	42,633	39.79
Nilo Gomez	Team I Love San Mateo	Nationalist People's Coalition	41,584	38.81
Joey Briones	Team I Love San Mateo	Nationalist People's Coalition	40,750	38.03
Steve Naval	Team I Love San Mateo	Nationalist People's Coalition	40,128	37.45
Jojo Juta	Team I Love San Mateo	Nationalist People's Coalition	40,106	37.43
Dylan Diaz	Team 1SanMateo	Akay National Political Party	31,578	29.47
Hector Reyes	Team 1SanMateo	Akay National Political Party	31,103	29.03
Butchoy Cruz	Team 1SanMateo	Partido Federal ng Pilipinas	28,457	26.56
Garry Linco	Team 1SanMateo	Akay National Political Party	23,315	21.76
Hermie Cequeña	Team 1SanMateo	Partido Federal ng Pilipinas	21,267	19.85
Randy De Las Armas	Team 1SanMateo	Partido Federal ng Pilipinas	21,260	19.84
Anna Santos-Alberto	Independent		20,476	19.11
Allan Fernandez	Team 1SanMateo	Akay National Political Party	19,283	18.00
Mib Buenviaje	Independent		19,145	17.87
Wilfredo Ernan Selga	Independent		15,663	14.62
Arnold Jacobe	Team 1SanMateo	Partido Federal ng Pilipinas	13,844	12.92
Monching De Dios	Independent		9,770	9.12
John Noel Molbog	Independent		5,675	5.30
Benito Bocatcat	Independent		4,959	4.63
Alexander Dupal-ag	Independent		3,468	3.24
Total			634,280	100.00
Total votes			107,147	–
Registered voters/turnout			134,335	79.76
Source: Commission on Elections

=== 4th District ===
- Municipality: Rodriguez (Montalban)

==== Rodriguez (Montalban) ====
Incumbent mayor Ronnie Evangelista is seeking reelection for a second term. Former vice mayor Anecito Lizaran, who was defeated in 2022 by Ronnie Evangelista, is seeking to challenge his reelection bid. Joining the fray is incumbent councilor Carmela Javier, who is running as an independent. Also in the running is former mayoral contender Romy Grecia, who lost in 2019 by two percentage points. Several independent candidates are also vying for the mayoralty, such as Valentine Brady, Antonino Elam, and Don Salvador.

Rodriguez mayoral election
Party	Candidate	Votes	%
NPC	Ronnie Evangelista	106,638	66.65
Independent	Carmela Javier	38,958	24.35
Independent	Romy Grecia	7,536	4.71
Independent	Don Salvador	3,065	1.92
Independent	Anecito Lizaran	1,791	1.12
Independent	Valentine Brady	1,365	0.85
Independent	Antonino Elam	644	0.40
Valid ballots		159,997	92.03
Invalid or blank votes		13,861	7.97
Total votes		173,858	100.00
NPC hold			

Incumbent vice mayor Umpek Sison is seeking reelection for a second term. His opponents include Romy Grecia's running mate, Akmad Terowa, and independent candidate Elmer Amor.

Rodriguez vice mayoral election
Party	Candidate	Votes	%
NPC	Umpek Sison	134,020	89.43
Independent	Elmer Amor	11,588	7.73
Independent	Akmad Terowa	4,255	2.84
Valid ballots		149,863	86.20
Invalid or blank votes		23,995	13.80
Total votes		173,858	100.00
NPC hold			

Rodriguez sangguniang bayan election
Party	Candidate	Votes	%
PFP	Anne Cuerpo	91,599	9.36
NPC	Ivan Rodriguez	85,135	8.70
NPC	Mark David Acob	82,228	8.4
UNIDO	Onat Umali	80,485	8.22
NPC	Deck Lazarte	73,396	7.50
NPC	Arnel De Vera	61,648	6.30
NPC	Deck Buizon	57,740	5.90
NPC	Manok Marcelo	57,543	5.88
PFP	JT Torio	42,587	4.35
PFP	Bong Torres	35,403	3.62
Independent	Lloyd Gonzaga	35,065	3.58
PFP	Graeme Simbulan	34,469	3.52
UNIDO	Arnold Rivera	30,218	3.09
PFP	Roland Nery	28,899	2.95
PFP	Edwin Monares	28,773	2.94
PFP	Cloderick Torres	20,961	2.14
Independent	Elvie Silva	17,540	1.79
Independent	Ness Valdeavilla	16,744	1.71
Independent	Manny Buhisan	12,603	1.29
Independent	Matt Delos Angeles	12,142	1.24
Independent	Rolando Alcala	11,998	1.23
NPC	Francisco Rizal	10,586	1.08
Independent	Manuel Visaya Jr.	10,095	1.03
Independent	Alexander Acopio	9,324	0.95
Independent	Jonavz Navarra	9,185	0.94
Independent	Edhel Niño Galvan	7,837	0.80
Independent	Natalio Rongcalen	7,540	0.77
Independent	Deodato Angelo Cuaderno	7,086	0.72
Valid ballots		978,829	70.38
Invalid or blank votes		412,035	29.62
Total votes		1,390,864	100.100

=== Antipolo ===
Incumbent mayor Casimiro Ynares III is seeking reelection for a fourth term. Red Llaga, a candidate of KBL, is seeking to challenge the Ynares family's decade-long rule over Antipolo. Another candidate, Raldy Abaño, is a mayoral contender running under the WPP. Two Leybles are also running for office, Peter and Teddy Leyble. Both are relative unknowns, and it is unclear if they are both related to former mayor Nilo Leyble.

Antipolo mayoral election
Party	Candidate	Votes	%
NPC	Casimiro Ynares III	208,100	69.30
KBL	Red Llaga	55,027	18.33
Independent	Teddy Leyble	21,444	7.14
Independent	Peter Leyble	8,682	2.89
WPP	Raldy Abaño	7,019	2.34
Valid ballots		300,272	90.51
Invalid or blank votes		31,501	9.49
Total votes		331,773	100.00
NPC hold			

Incumbent vice mayor Pining Gatlabayan is term-limited and has decided to run as vice governor of Rizal. In her place, Casimiro Ynares III chose incumbent Antipolo 1st District board member Randy Puno as his running mate for vice mayor. Ronald Jesse Leis, an independent candidate, is seeking to challenge his vice mayoral bid.

Antipolo vice mayoral election
Party	Candidate	Votes	%
NUP	Randy Puno	225,442	83.22
Independent	Ronald Jesse Leis	45,454	16.78
Valid ballots		270,896	81.65
Invalid or blank votes		60,877	18.35
Total votes		331,773	100.00
NUP gain from NPC			

==== Antipolo's 1st District ====
Antipolo's 1st District sangguniang panlungsod election
Party	Candidate	Votes	%
NUP	Jill Tapales	90,288	10.63
NUP	Rico De Guzman	86,804	10.22
NUP	Agnes Oldan	84,029	9.90
NUP	Lemuel Zapanta	77,126	9.08
NUP	Ja Camacho	75,521	8.90
NUP	Robin Say	72,611	8.55
Independent	Robert Altamirano	68,208	8.03
NUP	JP Lawis	66,611	7.85
NUP	Marife Pimentel	59,758	7.04
Independent	Ronald Tolentino	43,319	5.10
Independent	James Estela	25,964	3.06
Independent	Rodel Mancilla	22,244	2.62
Independent	Vic Pierra	19,580	2.31
Independent	Joel Barbaraza	18,005	2.12
Independent	Rex Señeres	15,399	1.81
WPP	Fijinan Dizon	12,901	1.52
WPP	Cris Panisales	10,630	1.25
Valid ballots		848,998	68.31
Invalid or blank votes		393,818	31.69
Total votes		1,242,816	100.00

==== Antipolo's 2nd District ====
Antipolo's 2nd District sangguniang panlungsod election
Party	Candidate	Votes	%
NPC	LJ Sumulong	98,048	9.97
NPC	Christian Alarcon	95,085	9.67
NPC	Ronaldo Leyva	88,803	9.03
NPC	James Gatlabayan	87,998	8.95
NPC	Pina Garcia	87,102	8.86
NPC	Ian Masangkay	86,980	8.85
NPC	Michael Leyva	85,604	8.71
NPC	Paui Tapales	85,271	8.67
Independent	Toffee Sumulong	81,295	8.27
KBL	Abby Tapales	48,663	4.95
Independent	Blossom Engel	21,569	2.19
Independent	Bobet De Guzman	21,283	2.16
Independent	Benjie Inlayo	19,989	2.03
Independent	Jesse Samson	16,131	1.64
Independent	Helen Gella	15,813	1.61
Independent	Rosalie Victorino	14,343	1.46
Independent	Elena Culi	11,676	1.19
KBL	Elvis Llaban	10,828	1.10
WPP	Dante Vitalicio	6,829	0.69
Valid ballots		983,310	69.67
Invalid or blank votes		428,058	30.33
Total votes		1,411,368	100.00
