= Mia Ynares =

Filipino politician (born 1976)

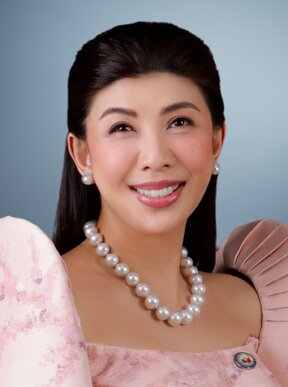
- Official portrait, 2026

Member of the Philippine House of Representatives from Rizal's 1st district
- Incumbent
- Assumed office June 30, 2025
- Preceded by: Jack Duavit

Personal details
- Born: Rebecca Maria Alcantara Ynares; October 1, 1976 (age 49) Quezon City, Philippines
- Party: NPC (2024–present)
- Parents: Casimiro Ynares Jr. (father); Rebecca Ynares (mother)
- Relatives: Nina Ynares (sister); Casimiro Ynares III (brother); Rhea Ynares (cousin)
- Occupation: Businesswoman; politician

Rebecca Maria "Mia" Alcantara Ynares (born October 1, 1976) is a Filipina politician and businesswoman who has served as the representative of Rizal's first district since 2025. She is the youngest daughter of former governors Casimiro Ynares Jr. and Rebecca Ynares.

== Early life ==
Ynares, nicknamed "Mia," was born Rebecca Maria Alcantara Ynares on October 1, 1976, in Quezon City, to Casimiro Ynares Jr., who was then the mayor of Binangonan, Rizal, and Rebecca Ynares as their youngest daughter. She is also the sister of incumbent Rizal governor Nina Ynares and incumbent Antipolo mayor Casimiro Ynares III. She is part of the Ynares family, which has ruled the province of Rizal since 1992.

Prior to entering politics, Ynares served as an independent director on the board of directors of the Bank of Commerce. She served as director during the bank's period of growth and digital expansion. Ynares stepped down from the board following her victory from the 2025 election.

== House of Representatives ==
On October 8, 2024, Ynares substituted her mother, Rebecca Ynares, as a candidate for representative in Rizal's first district. In filing her candidacy, she was accompanied by her sister, Nina Ynares, who filed her certificate of candidacy to run for a second term as Rizal governor. She went on to win the seat in the 2025 election, succeeding Jack Duavit.

For the 20th Congress, Ynares is a member of the majority, as well as being a member of the Food Security, Higher and Technical Education, Information and Communications Technology, and Trade and Industry committees.

== Electoral history ==
Electoral history of Mia Ynares
Year	Office	Party	Votes received				Result
Year	Office	Party	Total	%	P.	Swing	Result
2025	District Representative of Rizal's 1st District	NPC	255,258	72.03%	1st	—N/a	Won

House of Representatives of the Philippines
Preceded by Jack Duavit	Representative of Rizal's 1st congressional district 2025–present	Incumbent
