= 2025 Antipolo local elections =

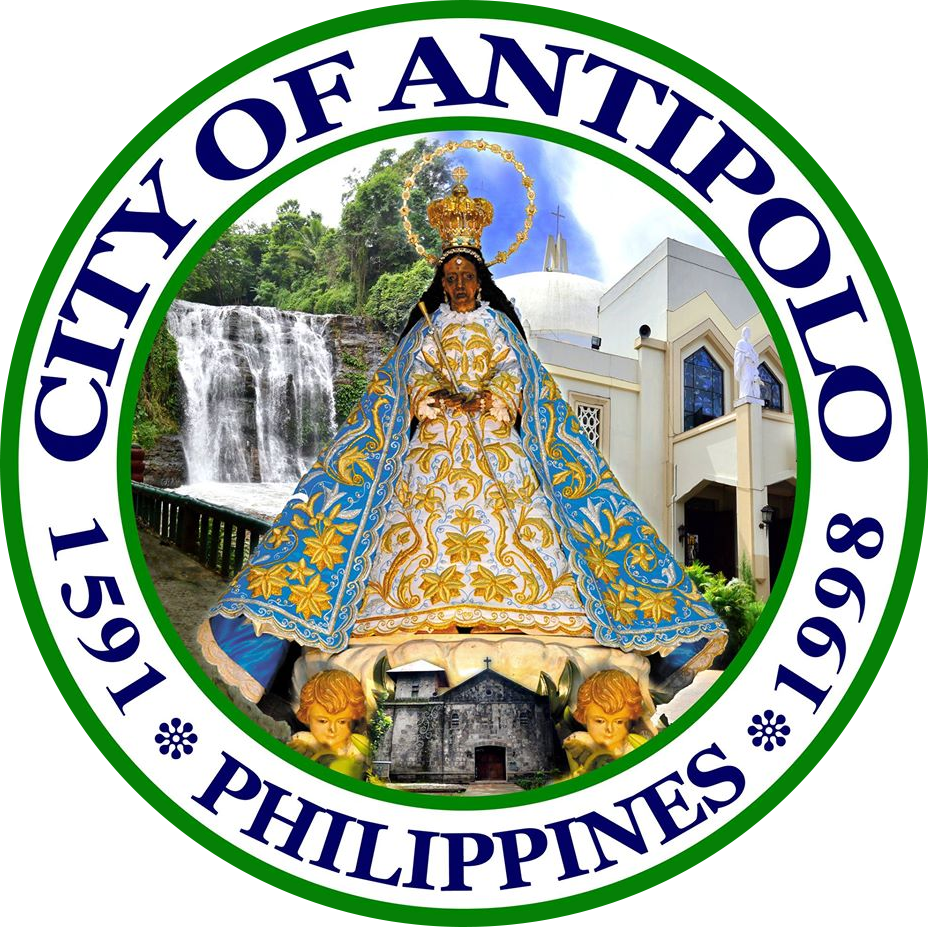
- May 12, 2025
- Mayoral election
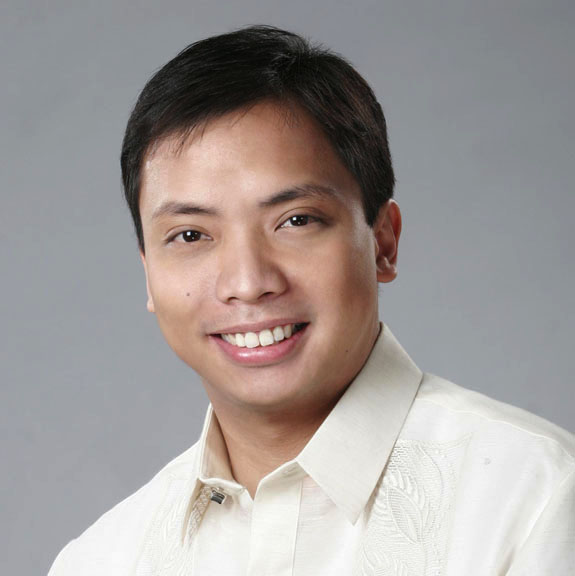

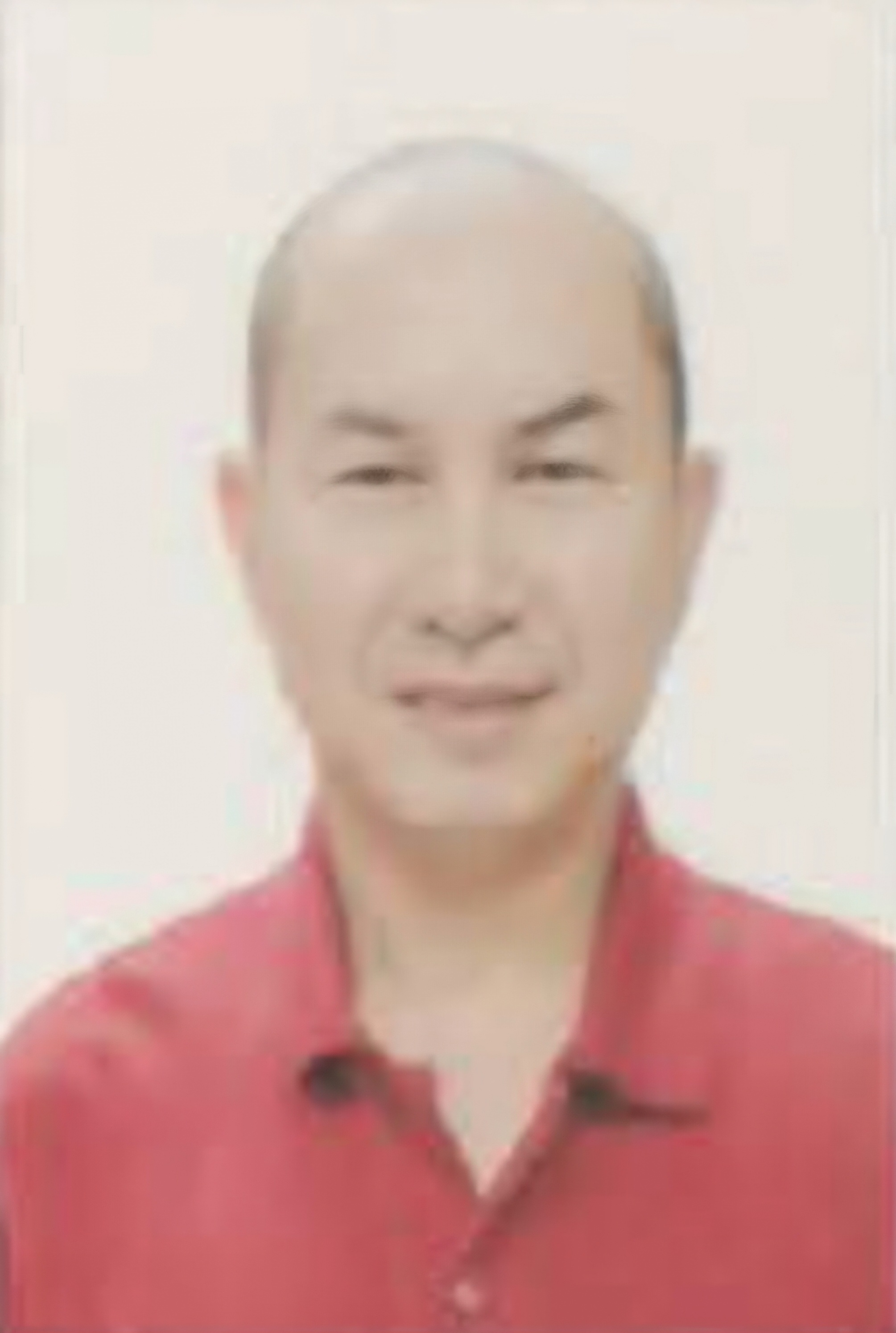
Candidate	Jun Ynares	Red Llaga
Party	NPC	KBL
Alliance	Team Ynares-Puno
Running mate	Randy Puno
Popular vote	208,100	55,027
Percentage	69.31	18.32%
Mayor before election
Jun Ynares
NPC
Elected mayor
Jun Ynares
NPC
- Vice mayoral election
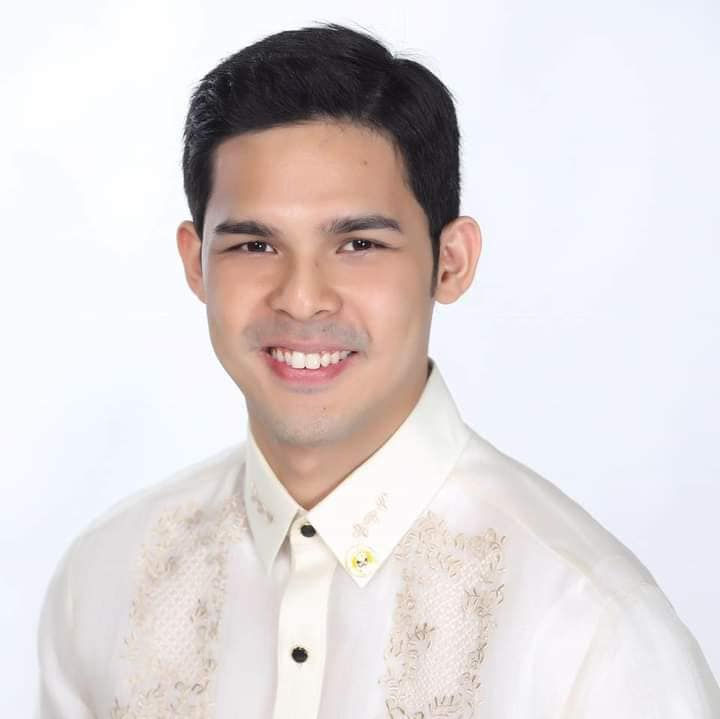
		IND
Candidate	Randy Puno	Ronaldo Jesse Leis
Party	NUP	Independent
Alliance	Team Ynares-Puno
Popular vote	225,442	45,454
Percentage	83.23%	16.77%
Vice Mayor before election
Josefina "Pining" Gatlabayan
NPC
Elected Vice Mayor
Roberto Andres "Randy" Puno Jr.
NUP

Local elections are scheduled to be held in Antipolo on May 12, 2025, as part of the 2025 Philippine general election. The electorate will elect a mayor, a vice mayor, 18 members of the Antipolo City Council, and two district representatives to the House of Representatives of the Philippines. The elected officials will assume their respective offices on June 30, 2025, for a three-year term.

== Background ==
Incumbent Mayor Jun Ynares ran for his fourth term in office. He faced Reden "Red" Llaga, who sought to challenge the long-decade rule of the Ynares family in Antipolo. Teddy Leyble, Peter Leyble, and Raldy Abaño.

Vice Mayor Josefina "Pining" Gatlabayan ran for Vice Governor of Rizal and won. Roberto Andres Jr. "Randy" Puno, son of first district representative Roberto Puno ran in her place only facing Ronaldo Leis Jesse.

Reynaldo Nicholas "Nick" Puno, brother of Vice Mayor-elect Randy Puno, ran unopposed for the first district board member position.

Second district board member, former Mayor Danilo "Nilo" Leyble, ran for his third and final term. He only faced Emmanuel Yator.

First District Representative Roberto "Robbie" Puno is term-limited. His brother, former first district representative Ronaldo Puno, ran in his place. He faced Manuel Relorcasa and Sonia Ampo.

Second District Representative Romeo Acop ran for his fifth term unopposed.

== Mayoral election ==
Mayor Jun Ynares ran for his fourth term in office. Ynares won the elections with a huge margin against his closest opponent, Red Llaga.

Antipolo Mayoral Election
Party	Candidate	Votes	%
NPC	Jun Ynares	208,100	69.31
KBL	Reden "Red" Llaga	55,027	18.32
Independent	Teddy Leyble	21,444	7.14
Independent	Pedro "Peter" Leyble	8,682	2.89
Independent	Wilfredo "Willie" Gelacio Sr.	7,019	2.34
Total votes		300,272	100%
NPC hold			

== Vice Mayoral election ==
First District Board Member Randy Puno won in a huge landslide against his opponent, Ronaldo Jesse Leis.

Antipolo Mayoral Election
Party	Candidate	Votes	%
NUP	Roberto Andres Jr. "Randy" Puno	225,442	83.23
Independent	Ronaldo Jesse Leis	45,454	16.77
Total votes		270,896	100%
NUP hold			

== Provincial board elections ==
=== First District ===
Reynaldo Nicholas "Nick" Puno won the elections unopposed.

Rizal Provincial Board election at Antipolo's 1st district
Party	Candidate	Votes	%
NUP	Reynaldo Nicholas "Nick" Puno	104,810	100.00
Total votes		104,810	100.00
NUP hold			

=== Second District ===
Second District Board Member and former Mayor Danilo "Nilo" Leyble won in a huge landslide against his opponent, Emmanuel Yator.

Rizal Provincial Board election at Antipolo's 2nd district
Party	Candidate	Votes	%
NPC	Danilo "Nilo" Leyble	118,946	86.37
Independent	Emmanuel Josol Yator	18,779	13.63
Total votes		137,725	100.00
NPC hold			

== Congressional elections ==
=== First District ===
First District Representative Ronnie Puno won the elections.

Philippine House of Representatives election at Antipolo's 1st district
Party	Candidate	Votes	%
NUP	Ronnie Puno	119,885	87.30
Independent	Manuel Relorcasa	9,113	6.63
Independent	Sonia Ampo	8,332	6.06
Total votes		137,330	100%
NUP hold			

=== Second District ===
Second District Representative Romeo Acop won unopposed.

Philippine House of Representatives election at Antipolo's 2nd district
Party	Candidate	Votes	%
NUP	Romeo Acop	131,925	100.00
Total votes		131,925	100.00
NUP hold			

== City council elections ==
Italicized candidates that ran for re-election.

Party	Votes	%	Seats
Nationalist People's Coalition	714,891	39.47	8
National Unity Party	612,748	33.83	7
Kilusang Bagong Lipunan	59,491	3.28	0
Workers' and Peasants' Party	30,360	1.68	0
Independent	393,535	21.73	1
Ex officio seats			2
Total	1,811,025	100.00	18

=== First District ===
Antipolo City Council election at the 1st district
Party	Candidate	Votes	%
NUP	Charmaine Jill "Atty. Jill" Tapales	90,288	10.63
NUP	Enrico "Doc Rico" De Guzman	86,804	10.22
NUP	Agnes Oldan-Gratil	84,029	9.90
NUP	Lemuel Zapanta	77,126	9.09
NUP	Jewel Anne "Ja" Camacho	75,521	8.90
NUP	Robin Say	72,611	8.55
Independent	Robert "Superman" Altamirano Sr.	68,208	8.03
NUP	Juan Ponciano "JP" Lawis	66,611	7.85
NUP	Mariafe "Marife" Pimentel	59,758	7.04
Independent	Ronald Tolentino	43,319	5.10
Independent	James Estela	25,964	3.06
Independent	Rodel Mancilla	22,244	2.62
Independent	Vic Pierra	19,580	2.31
Independent	Joel "Toto Joel" Barbaza	18,005	2.12
Independent	Reneses "Rex" Señeres	15,399	1.81
WPP	Fijinan Dizon	12,901	1.52
WPP	Cressincio "Cris" Panisales	10,630	1.25
Total votes		848,998	100.00

Party	Votes	%	Seats
National Unity Party	612,748	72.17	7
Workers' and Peasants' Party	23,531	2.77	0
Independent	212,719	25.06	1
Total	848,998	100.00	8

=== Second District ===
Antipolo City Council election at the 2nd district
Party	Candidate	Votes	%
NPC	Lorenzo Juan "LJ" Sumulong III	98,048	9.40
NPC	Christian Edward Alarcon	95,085	9.12
NPC	Ronaldo "Puto" Leyva	88,803	8.52
NPC	James Gatlabayan	87,998	8.44
NPC	Josefina "Ka Pina" Garcia	87,102	8.36
NPC	Christian "Dok Ian" Masangkay	86,980	8.34
NPC	John Michael Leyva	85,604	8.21
NPC	Irvin Paulo "Paui" Tapales	85,271	8.18
Independent	Christopher Emmanuel "Toffee" Sumulong	81,295	7.80
KBL	Abraham "Abby" Tapales	48,663	4.67
Independent	Blossom Engel	21,569	2.07
Independent	Abraham "Bobet" De Guzman Jr.	21,283	2.04
Independent	Benjamin "Sir Benjie" Inlayo	19,989	1.92
Independent	Jessie Samson	16,131	1.55
Independent	Helen Gella	15,813	1.52
Independent	Ma Rosalie Victorino	14,343	1.38
Independent	Elena Culi	11,676	1.12
KBL	Elvis "Supremo Oragon" Llaban	10,828	1.04
WPP	Dante Vitalicio	6,829	0.66
Total votes		1,042,340	100.00

Party	Votes	%	Seats
Nationalist People's Coalition	714,891	72.70	8
Kilusang Bagong Lipunan	59,491	6.05	0
Workers' and Peasants' Party	6,829	0.69	0
Independent	202,099	20.55	0
Total	983,310	100.00	8
