= Nina Ynares =

Filipino politician

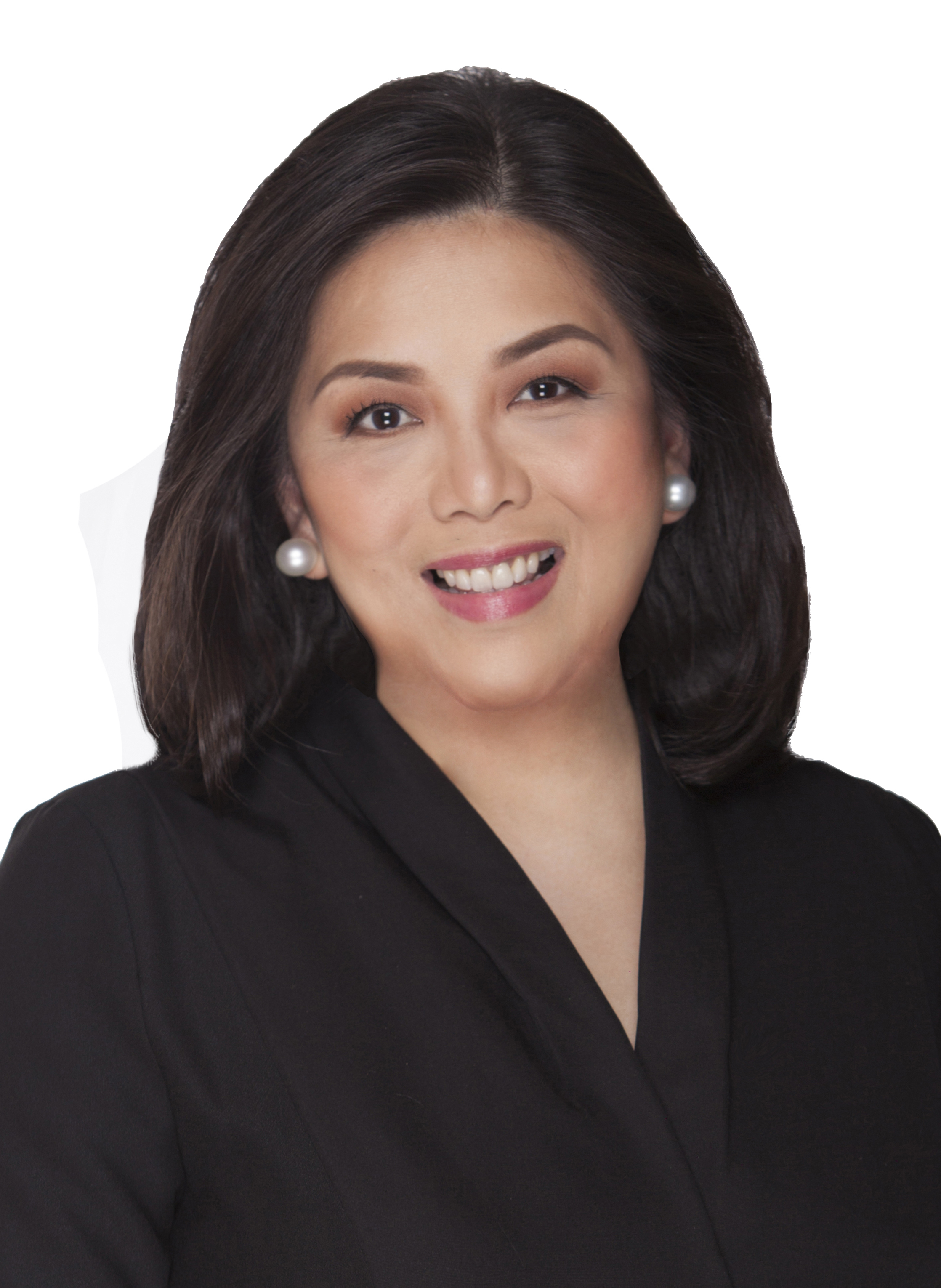
- Official portrait, 2017

23rd Governor of Rizal
- Incumbent
- Assumed office June 30, 2022
- Vice Governor: Reynaldo San Juan Jr. (2022–2025); Josefina Gatlabayan (since 2025)
- Preceded by: Rebecca Ynares

Treasurer of the League of Provinces of the Philippines
- Incumbent
- Assumed office August 2022
- Preceded by: Imelda Dimaporo

Personal details
- Born: Nina Ricci Alcantara Ynares; October 20, 1970 (age 55) Quezon City, Philippines
- Party: NPC (2021–present)
- Spouse: James Chiongbian II (died)
- Relations: Casimiro Ynares III (brother); Mia Ynares (sister); Consuelo Ynares-Santiago (aunt); Rhea Ynares (cousin)
- Children: 2
- Parents: Casimiro Ynares Jr. (father); Rebecca Ynares (mother)
- Education: De La Salle University (BS)
- Occupation: Politician

Nina Ricci Alcantara Ynares-Chiongbian (born October 20, 1970) is a Filipino politician who has served as the 23rd governor of Rizal since 2022. A member of the Nationalist People's Coalition, she concurrently serves as the treasurer of the League of Provinces of the Philippines.

Born to a political family in Rizal, Ynares studied business management at De La Salle University. She later served as a board member of the Government Service Insurance System in 2016 and remained until her resignation in 2021. In 2022, she ran to succeed her mother, Rebecca, as governor and won, extending their family's three-decade hold on the office. She was reelected to a second term in 2025.

As governor, Ynares's major initiatives have focused on disaster response and the environment.

== Early life and career ==
Nina Ricci Alcantara Ynares was born on October 20, 1970. She is the eldest daughter of Casimiro and Rebecca Ynares, both of whom would serve as governors of Rizal. Her siblings, Casimiro III and Mia, also went on to be active in politics.

Ynares studied at De La Salle University, earning her bachelor of science in business management in 1993. She went on to pursue her legal studies at the San Beda College of Law from 1993 to 1996. After graduating from college, Ynares began her career in the real estate industry. Eventually, she pursued culinary studies abroad, namely at the Lorenzo de Medici Université in Florence, Italy, in 2001 and at the Le Cordon Bleu in Florence, Italy. Ynares is also an undergraduate in the Philippine School of Interior Design.

She previously served as the Junior Philippine Women’s Club president of the Binangonan chapter from 1992 until 1998. Ynares was then later appointed by her father as his chief of staff and liaison officer at the Office of the Governor during his tenure. She also previously served as the treasurer of the Manila Luxury Condominium Corporation and JNM Realty and Development Corporation.

Ynares was appointed as a trustee of the Government Service Insurance System in 2016 and served until her resignation in 2021. She also served as a board member in the Manila Hotel Corporation from 2020 until her concurrent resignation in 2021 for her gubernatorial run.

== Rizal gubernatorial bids ==
=== 2022 ===
Ynares's father, Casimiro, initially planned to seek a return to the governorship, having filed his candidacy on October 1, 2021. However, he would later withdraw, with Ynares substituting for him. During the campaign, she endorsed the presidential bid of Bongbong Marcos.

=== 2025 ===
Ynares sought reelection in 2025 and only faced token opposition. With her vice governor, Reynaldo San Juan Jr., term-limited, she chose Josefina Gatlabayan as her running mate for the election. During the campaign, she endorsed the senatorial bids of Makati Mayor Abigail Binay and Senator Pia Cayetano. She went on to win a second term in the May 12 election with 83.48% of the vote. Her reelection was proclaimed the following day.

== Governor of Rizal (since 2022) ==
Ynares began her term as governor on June 30, 2022. She previously took her oath of office on June 25 at a ceremony at the Ynares Event Center. On August 15, she was named as treasurer of the League of Provinces of the Philippines.

=== Disaster response ===
Following severe rain enhanced by Typhoon Carina in July 2024, Ynares reported that four towns were "badly hit," prompting President Bongbong Marcos to order several government agencies to assist in relief operations.

In July 2025, following widespread flooding brought by monsoon-enhanced rain, Ynares declared a state of calamity in the province and urged the national government to issue a moratorium on the quarrying operations in the province.

=== Environment ===
In February 2024, Ynares and Secretary Toni Yulo-Loyzaga signed a memorandum of agreement for a sustainable water security project.

=== Freedom of Information ===
In May 2024, local journalists criticized the Ynares administration for having an ineffective public information office, which they say contributed to the widening of the information gap on local issues.

== Personal life ==
Ynares was married to James Chiongbian II, a member of a political dynasty in Sarangani, until his death in 2026. The couple has two children.

== Electoral history ==
Electoral history of Nina Ynares
| Year | Office | Party | Votes received | | | | Result |
| Year | Office | Party | Total | % | P. | Swing | Result |
|---|---|---|---|---|---|---|---|
| 2022 | Governor of Rizal | NPC | 952,019 | 85.51% | 1st | —N/a | Won |
| 2025 | Governor of Rizal | NPC | 884,132 | 83.48% | 1st | -2.08 | Won |

Political offices
| Preceded by Rebecca Ynares | Governor of Rizal; 2022–present | Incumbent |
Government offices
| Preceded by Imelda Dimaporo | Treasurer of the League of Provinces of the Philippines; 2022–present | Incumbent |
