= Casimiro Ynares Jr. =

Filipino politician (born 1946)

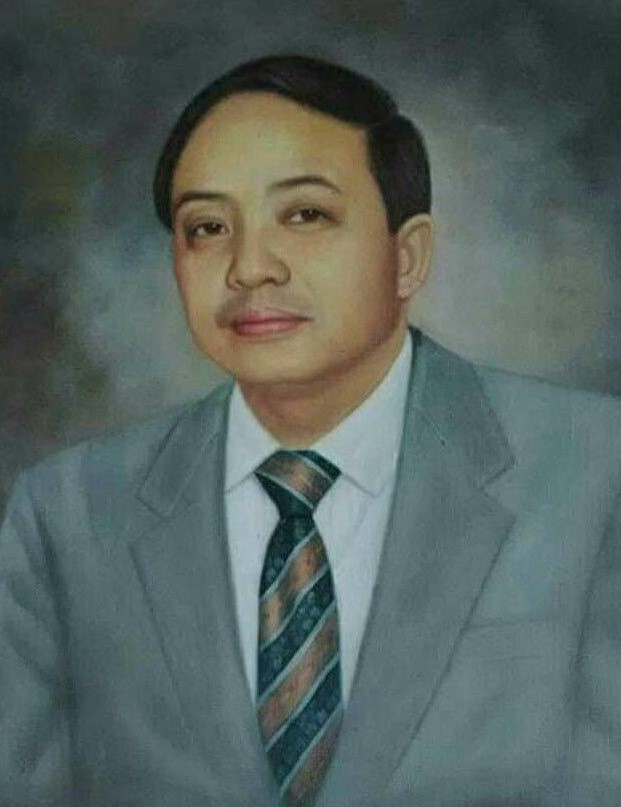
- Portrait, 1992

Presidential Adviser for Southern Tagalog
- In office February 14, 2021 – June 30, 2022
- Appointed by: Rodrigo Duterte
- Preceded by: Jose Maria Hernandez
- Succeeded by: Vacant

18th & 20th Governor of Rizal
- In office June 30, 2004 – June 30, 2007
- Vice Governor: Jestoni Alarcon
- Preceded by: Rebecca Ynares
- Succeeded by: Casimiro Ynares III
- In office June 30, 1992 – June 30, 2001
- Vice Governor: Nicandro Natividad (1992–1998); Benjamin Felix (1998–2001)
- Preceded by: Reynaldo San Juan Sr.
- Succeeded by: Rebecca Ynares

Mayor of Binangonan
- In office June 30, 1988 – June 30, 1992
- Vice Mayor: Joaquin Mendoza
- Preceded by: Mariano Cervo
- Succeeded by: Isidro Pacis Sr.
- In office December 30, 1971 – March 25, 1986
- Vice Mayor: Zoilo Estacio
- Preceded by: Pedro Fineza
- Succeeded by: Mariano Cervo

Personal details
- Born: Casimiro Martin Ynares Jr. August 25, 1946 (age 80)
- Party: NPC (1991–2003; 2006–present)
- Other political affiliations: PMP (2003–2006); LAMMP (1997–2001); KBL (1978–1986); Nacionalista (1971–1991)
- Spouse: Rebecca Ynares
- Relations: Consuelo Ynares-Santiago (sister); Rhea Ynares (niece)
- Children: 3 (Nina, Casimiro III, Mia)
- Parent: Casimiro Ynares Sr.
- Education: University of Santo Tomas (BA)
- Occupation: Politician

Casimiro "Ito" Martin Ynares Jr. (Tagalog pronunciation: [kasiˈmiɾo iˈnaɾɛs ˈdʒuːnjə]; born August 25, 1946) is a Filipino politician who served the 18th and 20th governor of Rizal, serving from 1992 to 2001 and from 2004 to 2007. Before his governorship, he served as the mayor of Binangonan from 1971 to 1986, and from 1988 to 1992. After his governorship, he was appointed by former president Rodrigo Duterte as the Presidential Adviser for Southern Tagalog from 2021 to 2022.

== Early life ==
Casimiro Martin Ynares Jr., nicknamed "Ito," was born on August 25, 1946. He is the eldest son of Casimiro Ynares Sr., who was the mayor of Binangonan at the time of his birth.

== Mayor of Binangonan ==
Ynares was elected as the mayor of Binangonan in 1971, becoming the youngest elected in its history at the age of 25. He remained as the mayor for 15 years due to the declaration of martial law by former president Ferdinand Marcos until his forced resignation as a result of the People Power Revolution in 1986. He was then re-elected to the position two years later in 1988 and served for four years until 1992.

== Governor of Rizal ==
Ynares was proclaimed as the governor of Rizal in 1992, defeating then vice governor Jose Barreto Sr. and board member Jovita Rodriguez, who was his closest rival. Both Barreto and Rodriguez filed motions seeking to defer and freeze the proclamation of Ynares and other newly elected officials because of alleged election irregularities. The electoral poll junked both motions, certifying Ynares's proclamation as governor. Ynares then tapped former Rizal congressmen Frisco San Juan Sr. and Gilberto Duavit Sr. as his advisers in an effort to restore Rizal to its status as a "premiere province."

During his first term, Ynares supported various projects and initiatives, such as supporting efforts to restore ecological balance and promote sustainable development for Laguna de Bay, sponsoring a sports event aimed at helping victims of the 1991 eruption of Mount Pinatubo, and starting a carnival and trade fair that features rides, game booths, and live shows.

== Presidential Adviser for Southern Tagalog ==
On February 14, 2022, Ynares formally accepted President Rodrigo Duterte's request for him to be the Presidential Adviser for Southern Tagalog, following the death of the previous secretary allegedly due to COVID-19. Before his appointment, former president Rodrigo Duterte signed an appointment paper in December 2020 confirming his appointment to the post.

== Controversies ==
=== Ynares Center walkout ===
In 2001, Laura Elorde, widow of boxer Flash Elorde, urged the Sports Press Photographers Association of the Philippines to reconsider a boycott of boxing events at Ynares Center in Antipolo, Rizal. The boycott was prompted by an incident where photographers, covering Manny Pacquiao's fight, were barred from ringside by security for obstructing VIP views, including that of then-Governor Ynares, leading to some verbal attacks and eventually the walkout. Elorde emphasized the significance of media coverage for boxing and warned that a lack of exposure could harm the sport's future in the country.

=== Involvement in fertilizer scam ===
In 2015, the Office of the Ombudsman found probable cause to indict Ynares on his alleged involvement in the ₱728 million Fertilizer Fund scam of 2004. He then issued a statement welcoming the Ombudsman's probe on his alleged involvement, noting, "This will give us the opportunity to bring out the truth at the proper forum,” and says that he trusts the country's justice system and is confident that he and his colleagues "shall be vindicated."

On February 6, 2017, Ynares was then charged with four counts of graft by the Ombudsman related to alleged overpricing of fertilizers bought by the Rizal Provincial Government in 2004 and 2005. According to the Ombudsman's investigation, Ynares entered direct contracts with Feshan Philippines without public bidding, resulting in inflated costs. Ynares and nine other officials violated the Anti-Graft and Corrupt Practices Act by favoring Feshan, causing gross disadvantage to the government.

In 2019, the Sandiganbayan denied Ynares's appeal to remand his graft case to the Ombudsman for reinvestigation. The court stated that Ynares and his co-accused had already been given a chance to appeal the Ombudsman’s finding of probable cause related to the controversial purchase of ₱3.6 million liquid fertilizer without public bidding. The court cited rules stating that after filing a motion for reconsideration, the accused could not file for reinvestigation. The Supreme Court further prohibits motions for reinvestigation if a preliminary investigation has been conducted and if the grounds involve credibility and admissibility issues.

Ynares was then acquitted on October 7, 2022, by the Sandiganbayan Third Division, including former officials of the Rizal Provincial Government, of graft charges related to allegedly overpriced Bio Nature Liquid Organic Fertilizers worth ₱1.8 million and ₱1.7 million from 2004 and 2005. The court found the prosecution failed to prove guilt beyond reasonable doubt, noting insufficient evidence of overpricing and lack of a Commission on Audit disallowance. Consequently, the court ordered the release of bail bonds and lifted travel restrictions on the accused.

== Electoral history ==
Electoral history of Casimiro Ynares Jr.
Year	Office	Party	Votes received				Result
Year	Office	Party	Total	%	P.	Swing	Result
1971	Mayor of Binangonan	Nacionalista	—N/a	—N/a	1st	—N/a	Won
1980	Mayor of Binangonan	KBL	—N/a	—N/a	1st	—N/a	Won
1988	Mayor of Binangonan	Nacionalista	20,495	—N/a	1st	—N/a	Won
1992	Governor of Rizal	NPC	136,203	40.46%	1st	—N/a	Won
1995	Governor of Rizal	NPC	220,382	61.61%	1st	+21.15	Won
1998	Governor of Rizal	LAMMP	405,017	84.34%	1st	+22.73	Won
2004	Governor of Rizal	PMP	463,320	72.91%	1st	-11.43	Won

== Personal life ==
Ynares is married to Rebecca Ynares, a member of a political clan in Taytay, Rizal. Together they have three children: Nina, Casimiro III, and Mia Ynares.
