= Casimiro Ynares III =

Filipino politician (born 1973)

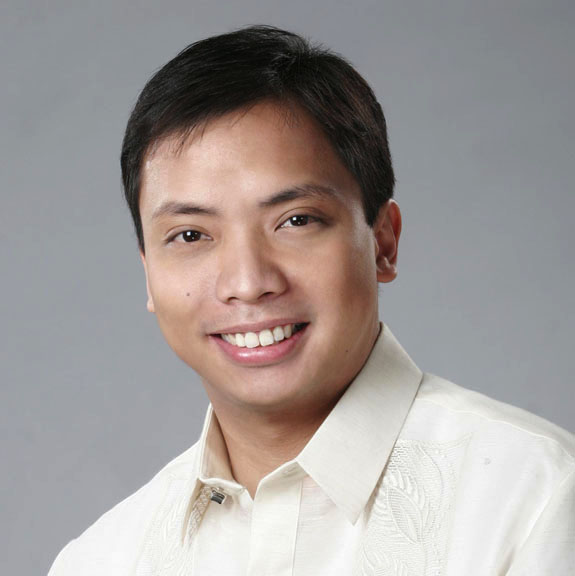
- Ynares in 2006.

Mayor of Antipolo
- Incumbent
- Assumed office June 30, 2022
- Vice Mayor: Josefina Gatlabayan (2022–2025); Roberto Andres Puno Jr. (2025–present)
- Preceded by: Andrea Bautista-Ynares
- In office June 30, 2013 – June 30, 2019
- Vice Mayor: Ronaldo Leyva (2013–2016); Josefina Gatlabayan (2016–2019)
- Preceded by: Danilo Leyble
- Succeeded by: Andrea Bautista-Ynares

21st Governor of Rizal
- In office June 30, 2007 – June 30, 2013
- Vice Governor: Frisco San Juan Jr.
- Preceded by: Casimiro Ynares Jr.
- Succeeded by: Rebecca Ynares

Personal details
- Born: Casimiro Alcantara Ynares III; March 4, 1973 (age 53) Quezon City, Philippines
- Party: NPC (2007–present)
- Spouse: Andrea Bautista (m. 2005)
- Relations: Nina Ynares (sister); Mia Ynares (sister); Consuelo Ynares-Santiago (aunt); Rhea Ynares (cousin); Bong Revilla (brother-in-law); Ramon Revilla Sr. (father-in-law)
- Children: 3 (1 deceased)
- Parents: Casimiro Ynares Jr.; Rebecca Alcantara
- Occupation: Politician
- Profession: Physician

Casimiro "Jun" Alcantara Ynares III (born March 4, 1973) is a Filipino physician and politician who is currently serving as the mayor of Antipolo since 2022, previously holding the position from 2013 to 2019. He previously served as the governor of Rizal from 2007 to 2013, as well as the public information officer of Antipolo from 2019 to 2022 under the mayorship of his wife, Andrea Bautista-Ynares.

Ynares is the son of former Rizal governors Casimiro Ynares Jr. and Rebecca Ynares. He is the brother of governor Nina Ricci Ynares.

== Early life ==
Casimiro Ynares III was born on March 4, 1973 to politician Casimiro "Ito" Ynares Jr., then the mayor of Binangonan, Rizal, and Rebecca Ynares. His grandfather, Casimiro Ynares Sr., also served as mayor of Binangonan in the 1950s as well as a Rizal provincial board member.

Ynares graduated from De La Salle University – Dasmariñas with a degree of Bachelor of Science in Biology Major in Medical Biology.

== Political career ==
On January 30, 2004, president Gloria Macapagal Arroyo announced the appointment of Ynares as general manager of the Laguna Lake Development Authority, with him taking office by February 2. He remained head of the agency through 2007.

=== Governor of Rizal (2007–2013) ===
On April 17, 2007, Ynares substituted for his father Yto Ynares as candidate for governor of Rizal, later winning the election. He won reelection in 2010.

=== Mayor of Antipolo (2013–2019; 2022–present) ===
Ynares won as mayor of Antipolo, Rizal in 2013, defeating incumbent mayor Nilo Leyble. He later won reelection in 2016, defeating vice mayor Ronaldo Leyva.

On January 30, 2024, he signed a memorandum of usufruct agreement to allow the construction of a DSWD Satellite Office for Calabarzon in the city. He said that the office would make the programs and services of the DSWD more accessible not just to Antipolo residents, but also to the people of Rizal and nearby towns of Laguna. He added that the office would also have a warehouse that would store readily available food and non-food packs that could be deployed during calamities and crises. The said office will serve as an extension arm of the DSWD Region IV-A.

== Personal life ==
Ynares met Andrea Bautista while he was attending medical school at the De La Salle University – Dasmariñas; they married on November 19, 2005. Bautista is the daughter of former senator Ramon Revilla Sr., and sister of actor and former senator Bong Revilla, and had also become mayor of Antipolo for one term from 2019 to 2022. They have three children: Audrey Ann (deceased), Cassandra Danielle, and Rebecca Victoria.

== Electoral history ==
Electoral history of Casimiro Ynares III
Year	Office	Party	Votes received				Result
Year	Office	Party	Total	%	P.	Swing	Result
2007	Governor of Rizal	NPC	526,695	94.72%	1st	—N/a	Won
2010	Governor of Rizal	NPC	575,296	73.05%	1st	—N/a	Won
2013	Mayor of Antipolo	NPC	128,108	51.14%	1st	—N/a	Won
2016	Mayor of Antipolo	NPC	212,662	70.33%	1st	—N/a	Won
2022	Mayor of Antipolo	NPC	253,549	—N/a	1st	—N/a	Won
2025	Mayor of Antipolo	NPC	208,100	69.31%	1st	—N/a	Won
