= Rhea Ynares =

Filipino politician (born 1984)

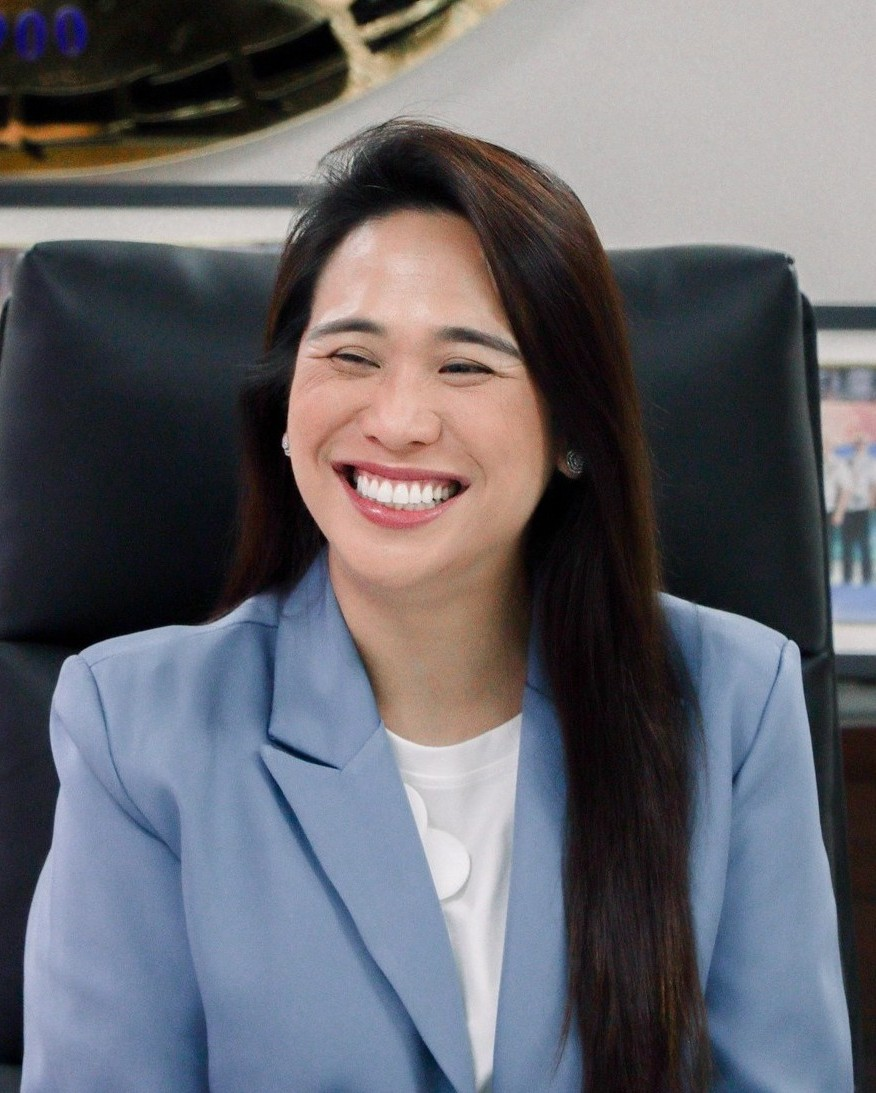
- Ynares in 2025

Mayor of Binangonan
- Incumbent
- Assumed office June 30, 2025
- Vice Mayor: Russel Ynares
- Preceded by: Cesar Ynares

Personal details
- Born: Ma. Elvira Cecille Rivera Ynares; September 13, 1984 (age 41) Quezon City, Philippines
- Party: NPC (2024–present)
- Spouse: Mark Reifel (m. 2013)
- Children: 1
- Parent: Cecilio Ynares (father)
- Relatives: Nina Ynares (cousin); Casimiro Ynares III (cousin); Mia Ynares (cousin)
- Occupation: Businesswoman, Politician

Ma. Elvira Cecille "Rhea" Rivera Ynares-Reifel (born September 13, 1984) is a Filipino politician and businesswoman who has served as the mayor of Binangonan since 2025. A member of the prominent Ynares family, she is the first woman to become the town's mayor.

== Early life and career ==
Ma. Elvira Cecille Rivera Ynares, nicknamed "Rhea," was born on September 13, 1984, in Quezon City. She is the only daughter of former Binangonan mayor Cecilio Ynares, who served from 2007 to 2016, and the youngest of three siblings.

In 2009, Ynares founded Serany Foundation Inc., a non-governmental organization based in Binangonan, focused on providing relief assistance to underprivileged sectors of the community. She currently serves as the foundation's president.

Ynares previously worked in the provincial capitol under the administration of her cousin, Nina Ynares, as the head of the Provincial Tourism Office.

== Mayor of Binangonan ==
Ynares won as the mayor of Binangonan in 2025, running unopposed in the polls. After her victory in the election, Ynares' local coalition, together with its victors, held a victory motorcade to "personally thank the public for their support." Before entering office, with the assistance of outgoing mayor Cesar Ynares, she implemented a new traffic trial scheme that would ease road traffic in Barangays Darangan, Pantok, Palangoy, and Bilibiran, which took effect on June 23, 2025. Together with the incoming elected officials of the municipality, Ynares was inaugurated on June 28, 2025, before their respective terms began two days later.

== Personal life ==
Ynares is married to Mark Reifel; together they have a daughter. She is a cousin of Rizal governor Nina Ynares, Antipolo mayor Casimiro Ynares III, Rizal's first district representative Mia Ynares, and Binangonan vice mayor Russel Ynares.

== Electoral history ==
Electoral history of Rhea Ynares
Year	Office	Party	Votes received				Result
Year	Office	Party	Total	%	P.	Swing	Result
2025	Mayor of Binangonan	NPC	82,101	100.00%	1st	—N/a	Unopposed

Political offices
Preceded by Cesar Ynares	Mayor of Binangonan; 2025–present	Incumbent
