= Consuelo Ynares-Santiago =

Filipino judge (born 1939)

The Honorable Consuelo Ynares-Santiago

145th Associate Justice of the Supreme Court of the Philippines
- In office April 6, 1999 – October 5, 2009
- Appointed by: Joseph Estrada
- Preceded by: Antonio M. Martinez
- Succeeded by: Martin Villarama Jr.

Personal details
- Born: October 5, 1939 (age 87) Binangonan, Rizal, Commonwealth of the Philippines
- Relations: Casimiro Ynares Jr. (brother)

Consuelo Ynares-Santiago (born October 5, 1939) is a former associate justice of the Supreme Court of the Philippines. She was appointed to the Court by President Joseph Estrada.

== Profile ==
Appointed on April 6, 1999, Ynares-Santiago is the first female member of the Supreme Court who rose from the ranks, having begun her career as a municipal judge.

A product of the UP College of Law where she graduated in 1962, Ynares-Santiago started her career in the judiciary in 1973 when she was appointed Municipal Judge of Cainta, Rizal, a position she held for thirteen years. In November 1986, she was appointed Regional Trial Court judge of Makati where she remained until her appointment to the Court of Appeals in 1990.

== Private life ==
A native of Binangonan, Rizal, where she was born on October 5, 1939, Ynares-Santiago received from that city in 1994 the Pambayang Gawad Palosebo, the highest municipal award given to outstanding citizens of Binangonan who have excelled in their professions and are role models for the youth.

=== Family ===
Consuelo is the daughter of Casimiro Ynares Sr, and Consolacion Y. Martin (both deceased). She was married to Atty. Francisco B. Santiago (founder of law firm, "FB Santiago, Nalus and Associates") until his death in July 1996 from a heart attack. Her daughter, Atty. Pura Angelica Y. Santiago is the managing partner of the Santiago, Cruz, and Sarte Law Offices. Her other children are Dr. Jonas Francisco, Regina Carmela and Jennylind Allison. Early in 2003, her son Dr. Jonas Santiago (of St. Luke's Hospital, Quezon City), supervised the removal of one of her kidneys at the Philippine Kidney Center.

== Bribery allegations ==
A still unresolved controversy over alleged bribery of Ynares-Santiago began in September 2007 when Amado "Jake" Macasaet wrote a story in his column for Malaya newspaper. He wrote that P10 million was delivered to a female Supreme Court justice and mistakenly opened by one of her staff members named Cecilia. There were five female Supreme Court justices at the time, but the circumstances (notably that she was the only one with a staff member named Cecilia—Daisy Cecilia Muñoz Delis) quickly made it clear that Ynares-Santiago was the target of Macasaet's column.

Macasaet alleged that the bribes were related to decisions on two cases before the judiciary, and that Cecilia was fired for having mistakenly opened them. Ynares-Santiago denied all the charges, and was supported in that denial by Delis. Delis said she never opened a box containing money intended for Ynares-Santiago, and that she had simply retired from her position. Others, including Senator Miriam Defensor Santiago (no relation) suggested that the charges are unfounded and intended to smear Ynares-Santiago and the entire judiciary in the interest of influencing other cases. Many others in and out of the judiciary defended Ynares-Santiago, calling her a "model of probity and integrity".

An investigation into the allegations was started in late 2007. But its efforts were complicated when two of the three members of the investigation (both retired justices) left the investigation in November 2007, citing personal issues. Macasaet was asked to reveal his sources by the investigation, and in August 2008 was convicted of contempt of court for refusing. He cited free speech and the right not to reveal a journalist's source.

== Some notable opinions ==
- Gamboa v. Aguirre (1999) — on right of a provincial Vice-Governor to preside over local council meetings while concurrently Acting Governor.
- Garcia v. Corona (1999) — on constitutionality of Oil Deregulation Law
- Estrada v. Desierto (2001) - Separate Opinion — on the validity of assumption to the presidency of Gloria Macapagal Arroyo
- People v. Lacson (2003) - Dissenting Opinion — on reinstitution of criminal cases for murder against Senator Panfilo Lacson
- People v. Genosa (2004) - Dissenting Opinion — on “battered women syndrome" as a defense in trial for spousal parricide (joined by C.J. Davide, J. Sandoval-Gutierrez and Austria-Martinez).
- Tenebro v. CA (2004) — on whether the annulment of the second marriage affects criminal liability for bigamy
- People v. Mojello (2004) — on right of an accused to an independent counsel of his own choice
- Agabon v. CA (2004) — on notice requirement for dismissals of employees for "just causes"
- In re: Habeas Corpus for Reynaldo de Villa (2004) — on propriety of writ of habeas corpus as a means to collect DNA evidence from a detained prisoner
- Ledesma v. CA (2005) - on authority of Ombudsman to dismiss local government officials
- HENRY T. GO vs. 5th Div. Sandiganbayan - on RA 3019, Sec. 3(g) applies only to public officers.

Legal offices
Preceded by Antonio M. Martinez	Associate Justice of the Supreme Court of the Philippines; April 6, 1999 – October 5, 2009	Succeeded by Martin Villarama Jr.
