= Pililla =

Municipality in Rizal, Philippines

- Municipality
- Municipality of Pililla
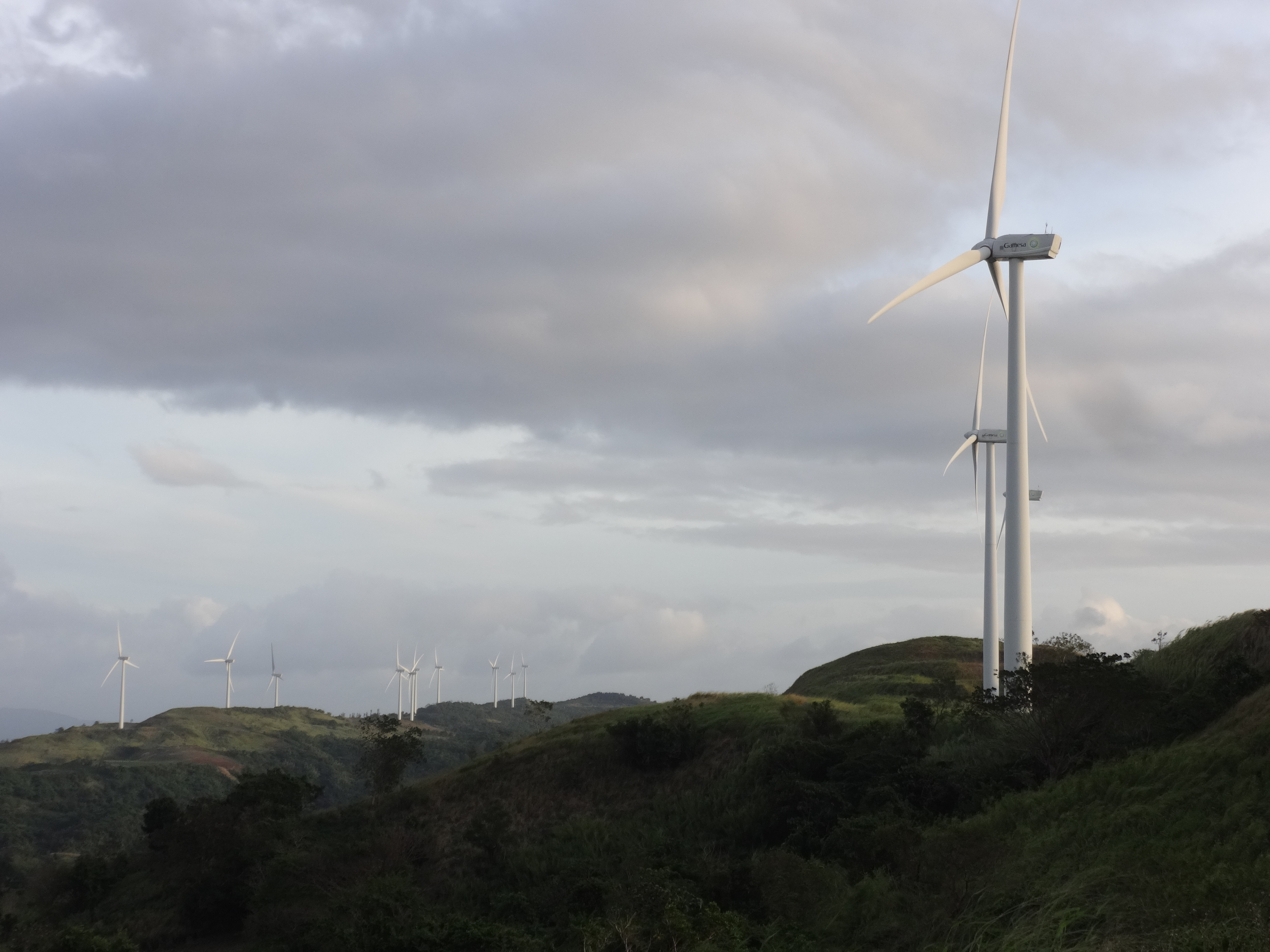
- Pililla Wind Farm

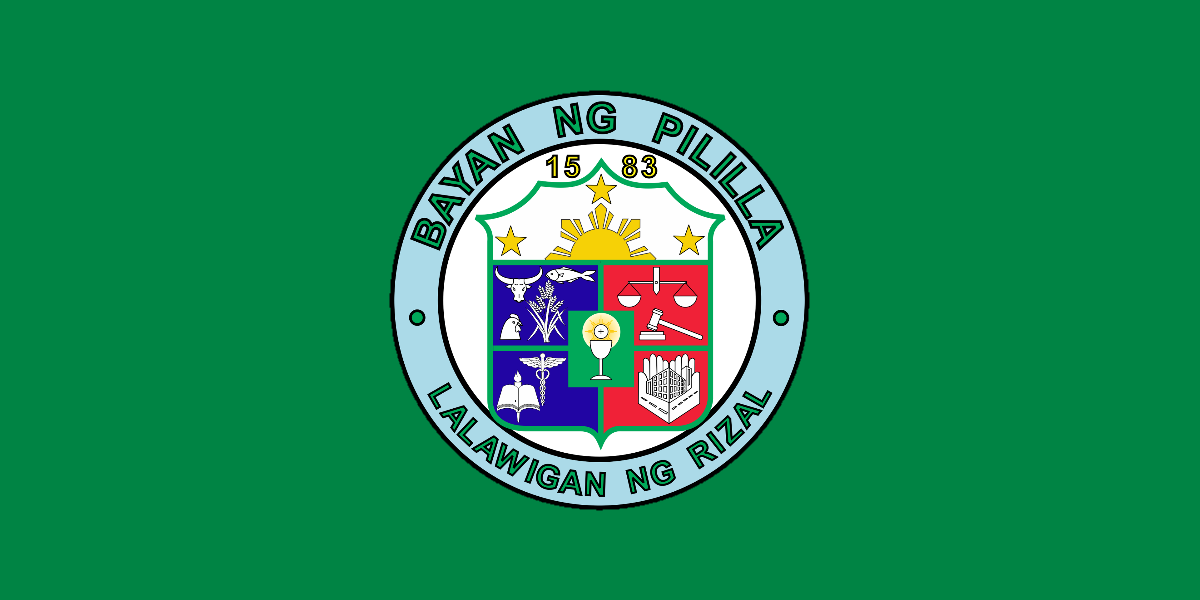
- Flag Seal

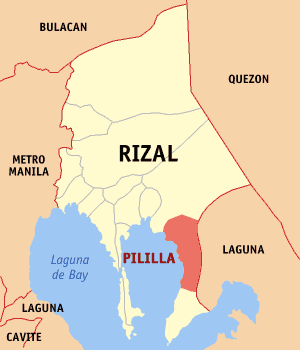
- Map of Rizal with Pililla highlighted
- Interactive map of Pililla
- Location within the Philippines
- Coordinates: 14°29′N 121°18′E
- Country: Philippines
- Region: Calabarzon
- Province: Rizal
- District: 2nd district
- Founded: May 5, 1583
- Barangays: 9 (see Barangays)

Government
  - Type: Sangguniang Bayan
  - Mayor: John V. Masinsin
  - Vice Mayor: Dan V. Masinsin
  - Representative: Emigdio P. Tanjuatco III
  - Municipal Council: Members: Dindo M. Abueg; John Lawrence A. Anero; Florence J. Benavidez; Yves Johncel M. Bermudez; Rafael L. Carpio; Ruel B. Masinsin; Bryan T. Paz De Leon; Jordan A. Olea
  - Electorate: 40,376 voters (2025)

Area
  - Total: 69.95 km^{2} (27.01 sq mi)
- Elevation: 55 m (180 ft)
- Highest elevation: 365 m (1,198 ft)
- Lowest elevation: 0 m (0 ft)

Population (2024 census)
  - Total: 72,503
  - Density: 1,036/km^{2} (2,685/sq mi)
  - Households: 17,674

Economy
  - Income class: 1st municipal income class
  - Poverty incidence: 10.92% (2023)
  - Revenue: ₱ 370.6 million (2024)
  - Assets: ₱ 860.6 million (2024)
  - Expenditure: ₱ 378.2 million (2024)
  - Liabilities: ₱ 520.2 million (2024)

Service provider
  - Electricity: Manila Electric Company (Meralco)
- Time zone: UTC+8 (PST)
- ZIP code: 1910
- PSGC: 0405810000
- IDD : area code: +63 (0)2
- Native languages: Tagalog
- Catholic diocese: Diocese of Antipolo
- Patron saint: Mary Magdalene (Town Proper) Didacus of Alcala (Barangay Quisao)

Pililla (/pɪˈliːljə/), officially the Municipality of Pililla (Tagalog: Bayan ng Pililla), is a municipality in the province of Rizal, Philippines. According to the 2024 census, it has a population of 72,503 people. It is surrounded by farms, small mountains, plains, and trees. Pililla is known as the Green Field Municipality of Rizal.

The town has preserved some religious and non-religious traditions such as the Santa Cruzan or Flores de Mayo, wherein men and women walk all over town with their gowns. Town Fiesta during the month of July is being visited by people from the city to experience the celebrations especially the amateur shows at night. Like other towns, Pililla holds basketball league competitions for youth during summer. Pililla is also a destination for road cyclists because of its asphalted road, specifically in Sitio Bugarin in Barangay Halayhayin.

== History ==
Pilang Muntî was the pre-Hispanic name of the settlement, ruled by a certain Salyan Maginto. His dominion covered the modern towns of Baras, Tanay, Pililla, and Jalajala. It was referenced as "muntî" ("small") in contrast to the nearby, much larger town of Pila in the province of Laguna.

Cavada, a Spanish historian, revealed that in 1571, Spanish forces conquered towns along Laguna de Bay, which they called "Rinconada de Morón" and Pilang Muntî was among the towns that surrendered. It was annexed to the town of Moróng in the north, and renamed "Pilang Moróng".

In 1572, the first Spanish missionary priests arrived at Pilang Moróng. Since then, Christianity was spread by the Spanish priests and in 1582, Fr. Juan de Placencia and Fr. Diego de Oropesa established a "visita" barrio at Pilang Morong. The place was divided by the Spaniards into five "rancherias":

- Monte de Tan-ay
- Sitio Tigbi (Lulukong)
- San Diego
- Monte Yakat
- Dolo Río (Wawà)

In 1583, Pilang Moróng became an independent town, and rechristened Pililla. The name arose from the diminutive rules in Castilian by modifying a name with "-illa" or "-illo" to indicate a smaller or younger version.

In 1599, 16 years after the town was given autonomy, the supreme government granted Pililla the authority to construct a church.

In 1600, the first church of cogon and bamboo was constructed in Dolo Río, but this burnt down and a church of wood was built. This also burnt down with the whole town in 1632. Another church made of wood was built and this suffered the same fate in 1668. Two years later, construction of the present church began, and was finished in 1673.

As an autonomous town, Pililla encompassed several barrios including Tanay and Jalajala. Tanay separated from Pililla and became an independent town in 1606. Jalajala became a barrio of Pililla in 1676 but was separated in 1786. It was reincorporated as a barrio of Pililla in 1816, but nine years later, it was once again separated from Pililla.

On December 4, 1837, an election of local officials was held in Pililla. The following towns participated in the said election: Moróng, Pililla, Tanay, Baras, Jalajala, and San Diego. The last town was a new town and is presumed to be either the barrio of Quisao, which has San Diego as its patron, or the barrio of Niogan.

In 1853, Pililla was separated from the province of Laguna to be incorporated into the newly created Distrito de los Montes de San Mateo. In 1857, it was given the new name Distrito Político-Militar de Moróng.

On March 10, 1861, two principales of San Diego presented to the government a request, on behalf of the residents of San Diego and the sitios of Mavia and Puang, that their territory be separated from Pililla and to create an independent town to be called Pérez. Both the gobernadorcillo and the parish priest, as well as the gobernador político-militar of Moróng, favored the petition. However, it was disapproved by the Administración Civil since the territory did not meet the pre-requisite of having at least 500 tributes, having only 298 tributes at that time.

On July 9, 1885, the government received another petition from the Cabeza de Barangay of San Diego requesting that it be made into a kind of self-governing barrio of Pililla, on account of its remoteness. On January 25, 1886, the government agreed to make San Diego into a "Visita con Teniente Absolute", on the condition that the barrio construct the necessary public buildings. Thus, upon the fulfillment of the agreed condition, the government's approval went into effect on June 18 of that same year.

In 1896, the Katipuneros of Pililla and San Diego established their military camp at Rambo or Pabaláng na Gubat.

Three years later, on August 6, 1898, Pililla was incorporated in the revolutionary government of General Emilio Aguinaldo. During the existence of the First Philippine Republic, San Diego became an independent town. On January 5, 1899, a fierce battle ensued between the American forces and the Filipino troops defending Pililla. The town was partially ravaged by fire and local troops had to retreat to the mountain of Tanay.

The towns of Pililla and San Diego were integrated into the newly created province of Rizal in June 1901. Two years later, the Philippine Commission, in line with its policy of economy and centralization, consolidated the towns of Pililla, San Diego and Jalajala with the seat of government in Pililla.

The first Capitán under the American regime was Regino Quitiong, who was alcalde from 1900 to 1901.

On September 20, 1907, Jalajala was separated from Pililla and became an independent municipality. Quisao, on the other hand, remained a barrio of Pililla up to the present.

In 1918, the population of Pililla was 2,776 and Quisao was 814. In 1929, the place called Longos within the jurisdiction of Pililla was cleared by the majority of the tenant population of the town of Jalajala who transferred their homes to this site and whereon they founded a new community, thus avoiding their agrarian conflict with the plantation owner of Jalajala.

On September 24, 1929, Don Ananías Vicencio, a philanthropist in public documents, donated a tract of land containing approximately 15 ha (37 acres) to the families of Manuel Roxas, Leoncio Carungay, and Quintin Golliden, all of Jalajala, who shall distribute and assign free of charge and to the best interest of the residents, the said lot at Longos, Barrio Quisao, Pililla. In 1939, this land was surveyed by Engr. Quintin Gollidon who provided the layout of this new community now called Barrio Malaya.

On December 13, 1942, the town of Quisao was attacked and pillaged by "tulisanes".

During the liberation of the town on March 18, 1945, nearly 3/4 of all the houses and public buildings were either burned or destroyed by American and Filipino military bombing and shelling. The Japanese forces and Makapili fled to the mountains following the liberation of the town. The PCAU of the US Army reestablished the municipal government of Pililla on April 20, 1945, with the designation of Lucio Aquino, an active guerrilla leader, as mayor.

== Geography ==
Pililla is 40 kilometres (25 mi) from Antipolo and 57 kilometres (35 mi) from Manila.

=== Barangays ===
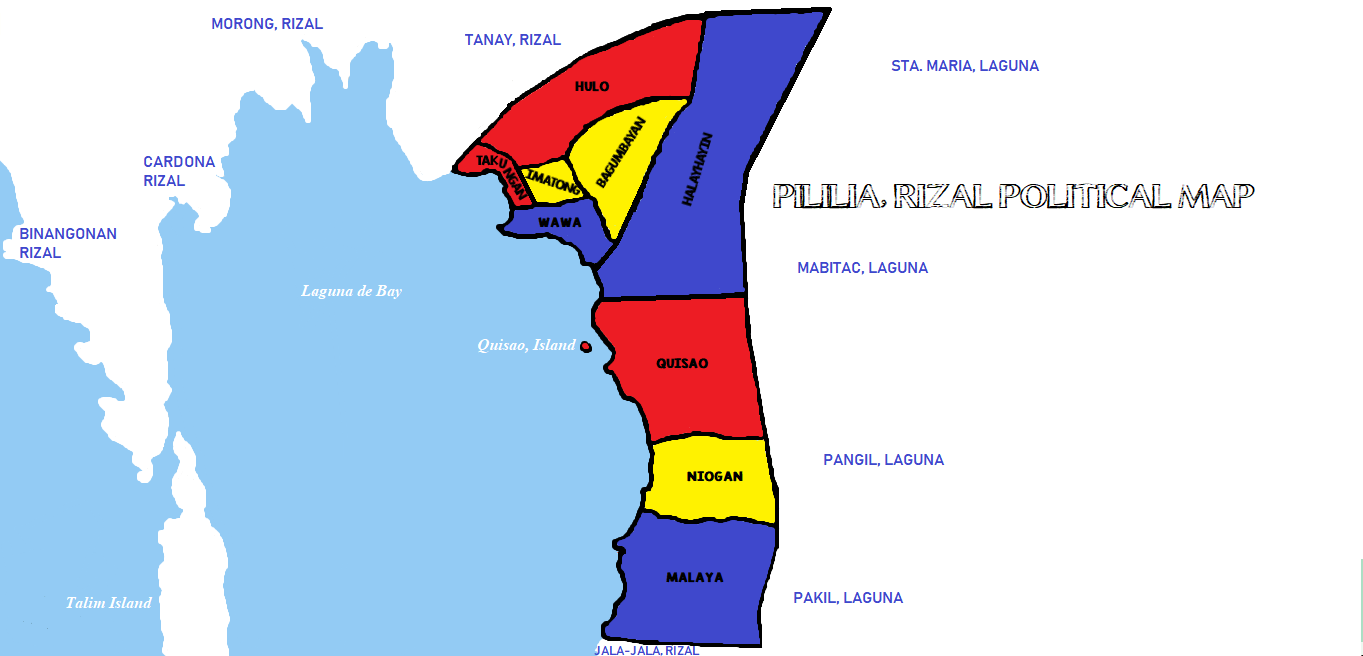
Pililla, Rizal political map

Pililla is politically subdivided into 9 barangays, as indicated below and in the image herein Each barangay consists of puroks and some have sitios.

| Barangay | Population (2024) | Area |
|---|---|---|
| Bagumbayan (Poblacion) | 13,483 | |
| Halayhayin | 9,806 | |
| Hulo (Poblacion) | 12,126 | |
| Imatong (Poblacion) | 794 | |
| Malaya | 7,546 | |
| Niogan | 5,850 | |
| Quisao | 17,361 | |
| Wawa (Poblacion) | 3,950 | |
| Takungan (Poblacion) | 1,587 | |
| Total | 72,503 | |

=== Climate ===
Climate data for Pililla, Rizal
| Month | Jan | Feb | Mar | Apr | May | Jun | Jul | Aug | Sep | Oct | Nov | Dec | Year |
|---|---|---|---|---|---|---|---|---|---|---|---|---|---|
| Mean daily maximum °C (°F) | 26 (79) | 27 (81) | 29 (84) | 31 (88) | 31 (88) | 30 (86) | 29 (84) | 29 (84) | 29 (84) | 29 (84) | 28 (82) | 26 (79) | 29 (84) |
| Mean daily minimum °C (°F) | 22 (72) | 22 (72) | 22 (72) | 23 (73) | 24 (75) | 25 (77) | 24 (75) | 24 (75) | 24 (75) | 24 (75) | 24 (75) | 23 (73) | 23 (74) |
| Average precipitation mm (inches) | 58 (2.3) | 41 (1.6) | 32 (1.3) | 29 (1.1) | 91 (3.6) | 143 (5.6) | 181 (7.1) | 162 (6.4) | 172 (6.8) | 164 (6.5) | 113 (4.4) | 121 (4.8) | 1,307 (51.5) |
| Average rainy days | 13.4 | 9.3 | 9.1 | 9.8 | 19.1 | 22.9 | 26.6 | 24.9 | 25.0 | 21.4 | 16.5 | 16.5 | 214.5 |
Source: Meteoblue

== Demographics ==
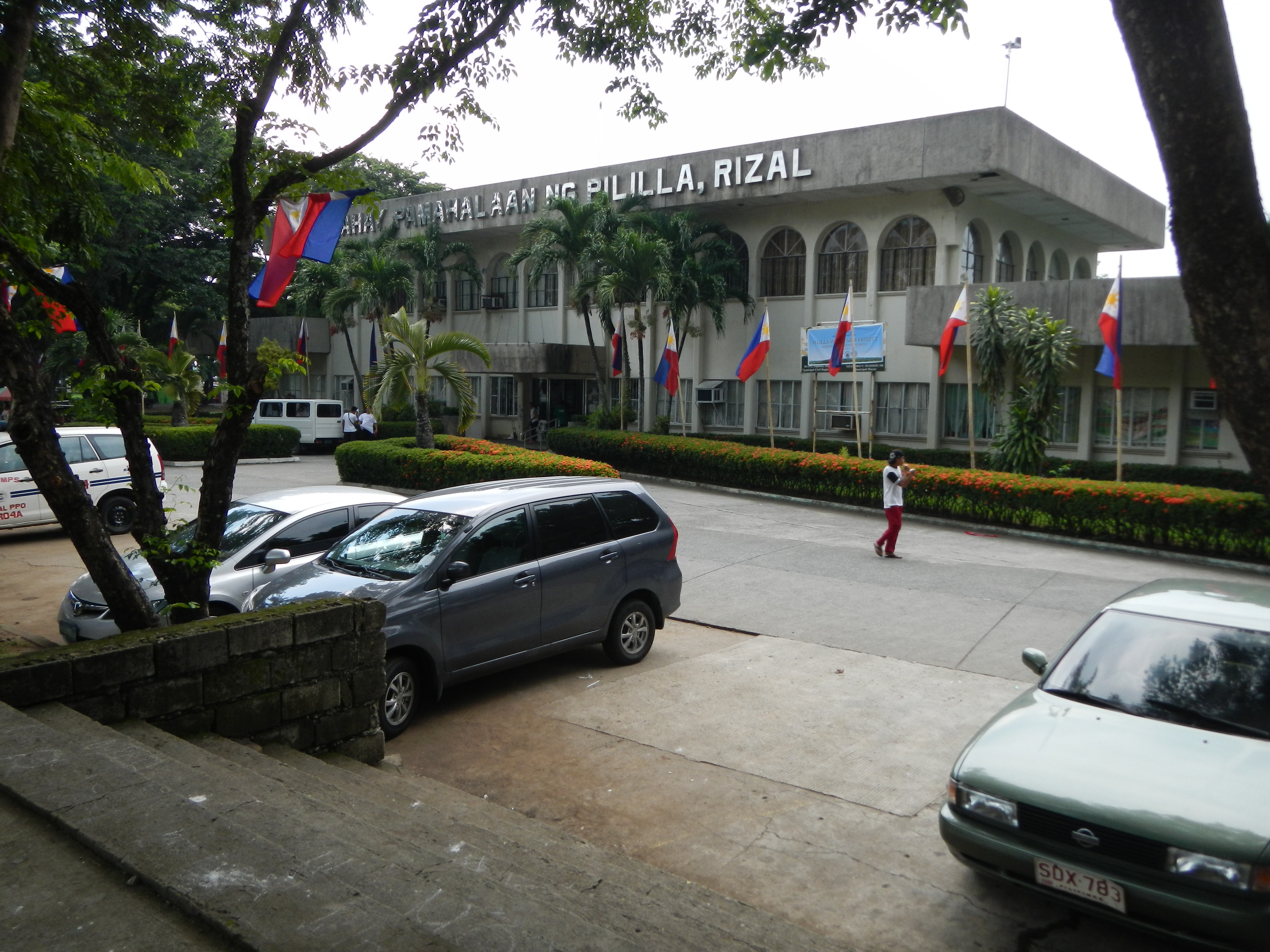
Pililla Municipal Hall

Population census of Pililla
| Year | Pop. | ±% p.a. |
|---|---|---|
| 1903 | 2,859 | — |
| 1918 | 4,701 | +3.37% |
| 1939 | 5,461 | +0.72% |
| 1948 | 6,067 | +1.18% |
| 1960 | 9,021 | +3.36% |
| 1970 | 15,052 | +5.25% |
| 1975 | 18,985 | +4.77% |
| 1980 | 23,222 | +4.11% |
| 1990 | 32,771 | +3.51% |
| 1995 | 37,081 | +2.34% |
| 2000 | 45,275 | +4.37% |
| 2007 | 58,525 | +3.60% |
| 2010 | 59,527 | +0.62% |
| 2015 | 64,812 | +1.63% |
| 2020 | 71,535 | +2.10% |
| 2024 | 72,503 | +0.32% |
Source: Philippine Statistics Authority

In the 2024 census, the population of Pililla was 72,503 people, with a density of 1,000 inhabitants per square kilometre or 2,600 inhabitants per square mile.

== Economy ==
Poverty incidence of Pililla (%)

Source: Philippine Statistics Authority

== Education ==
The Pililla Schools District Office governs all educational institutions within the municipality. It oversees the management and operations of all private and public, from primary to secondary schools.

=== Primary and elementary schools ===
- Aim Glory Learning School
- Bon Jasper Angels Academy
- Bugarin Elementary School
- Christian Light School
- Halayhayin Elementary School
- Holy Grace Christian Montessori
- Hulo Elementary School
- Jesus Christ Our Victorious Savior Christian Academy
- Malaya Elementary School
- Marvelous Bright Montessori School
- Matagbak Elementary School
- Niogan Elementary School
- Peniel Integrated Christian Academy
- Pililla Academy Foundation
- Pililla Elementary School Central
- Saint Adrian Montessori
- Sathya Sai School
- St. Peter the Apostle School
- Quisao Elementary School
- Virgilio B. Melendres Memorial Elementary School

=== Secondary schools ===
- Bugarin National High School
- Hulo National High School
- Malaya National High School
- Pililla National High School
- Quisao National High School

=== Higher educational institutions ===
- Emmanual John Institute of Science & Technology
- ESRA Technical Training Foundation
