= Rizal (province) =

Province in Calabarzon, Philippines

- Province
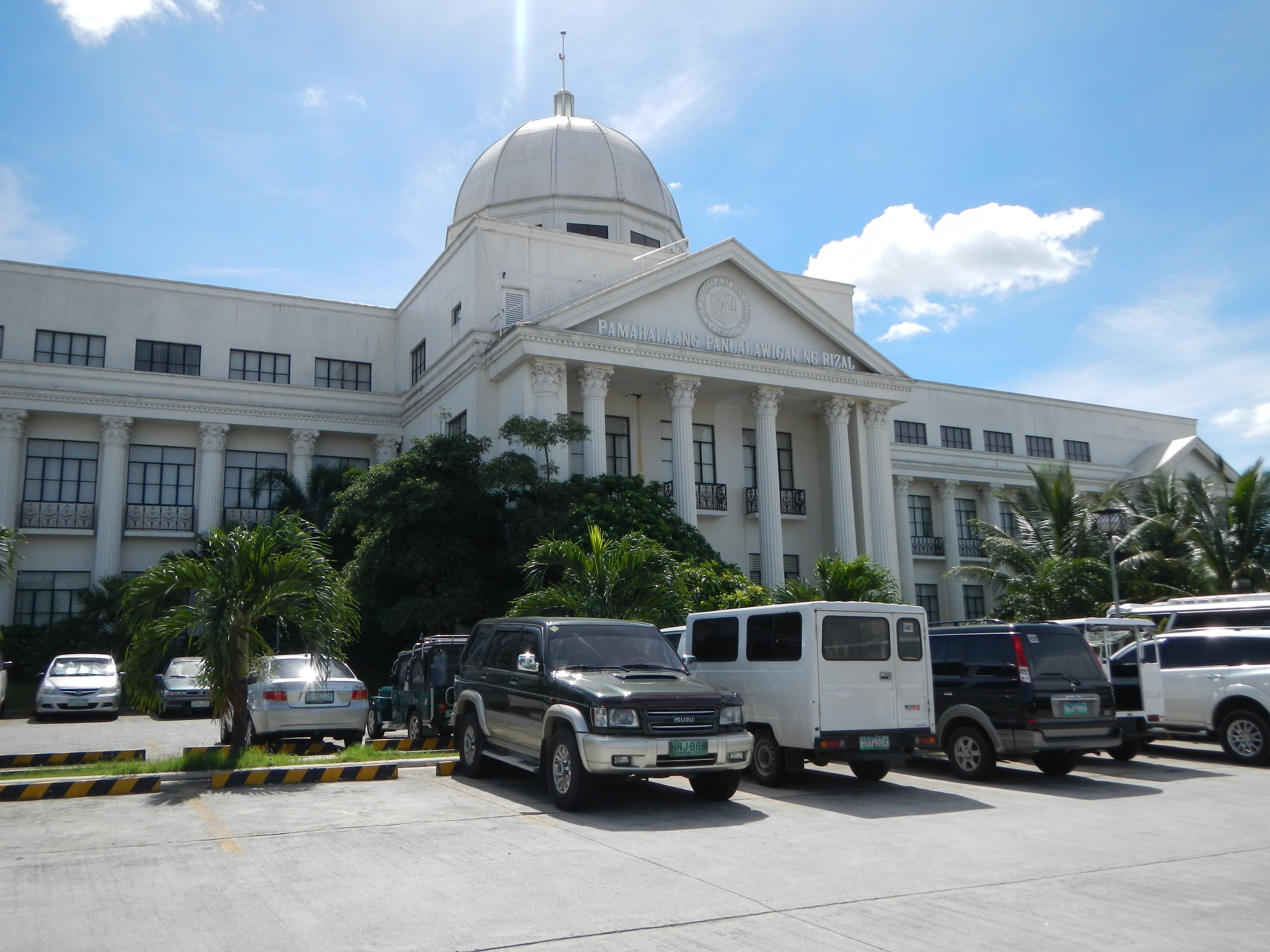
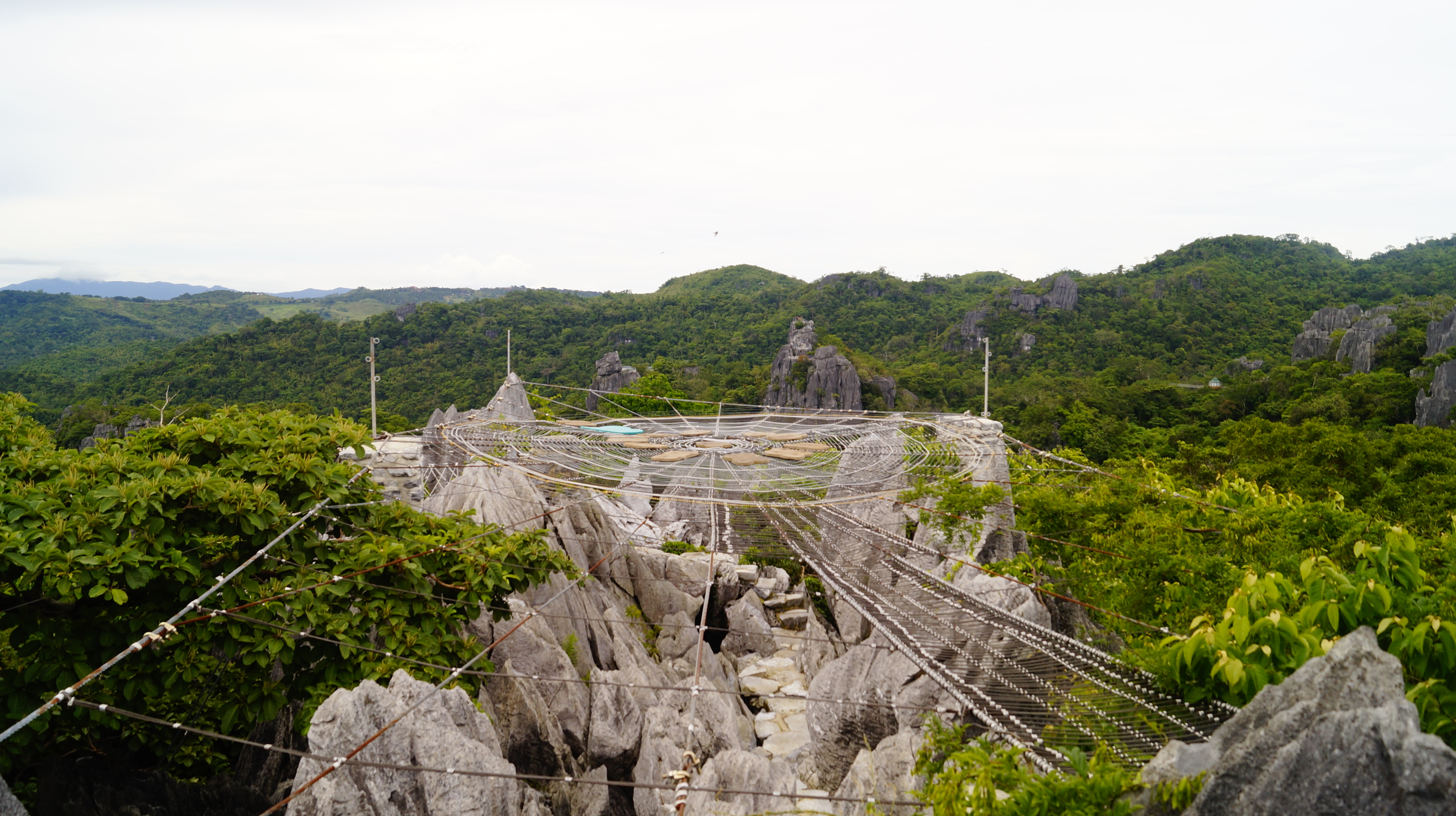
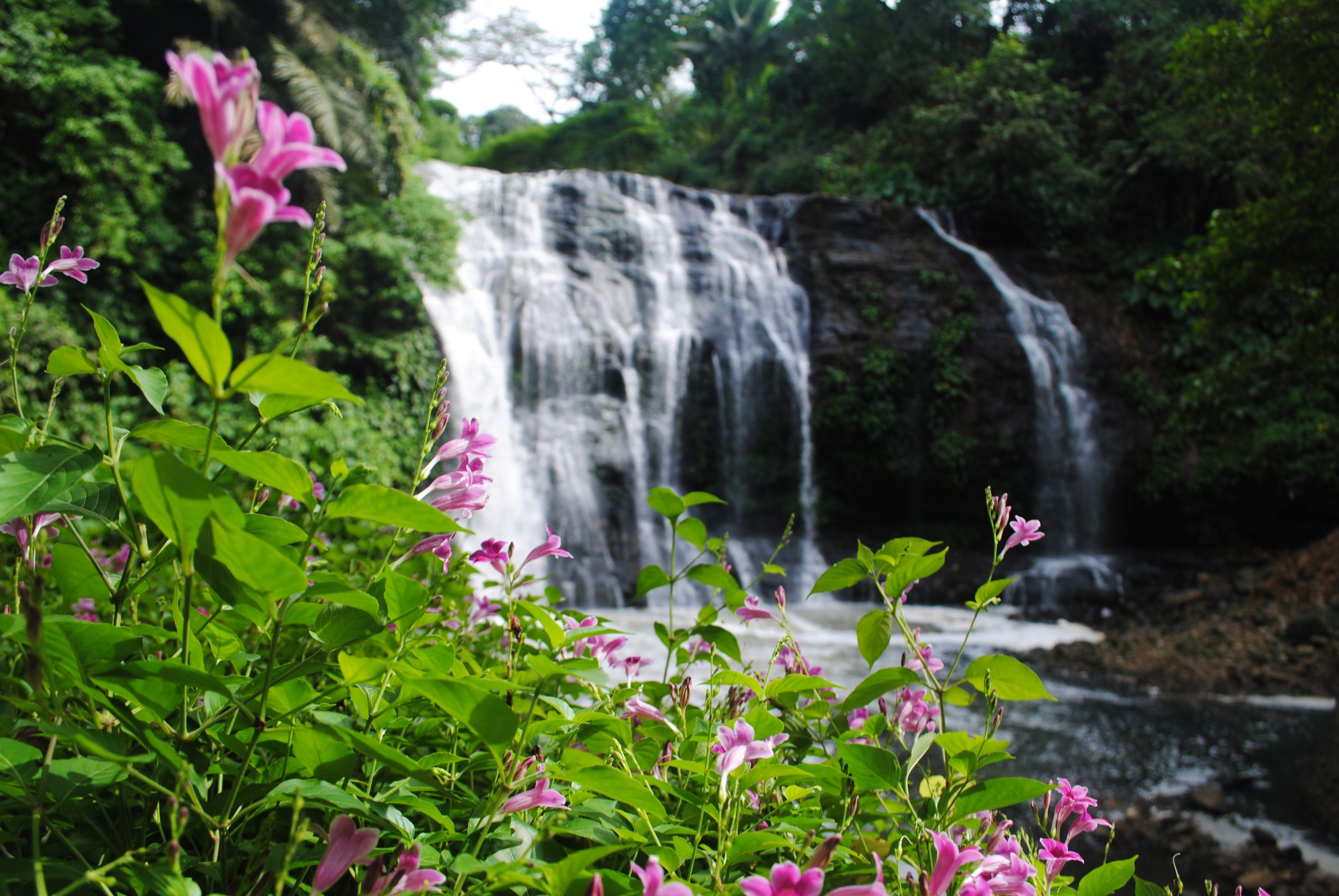
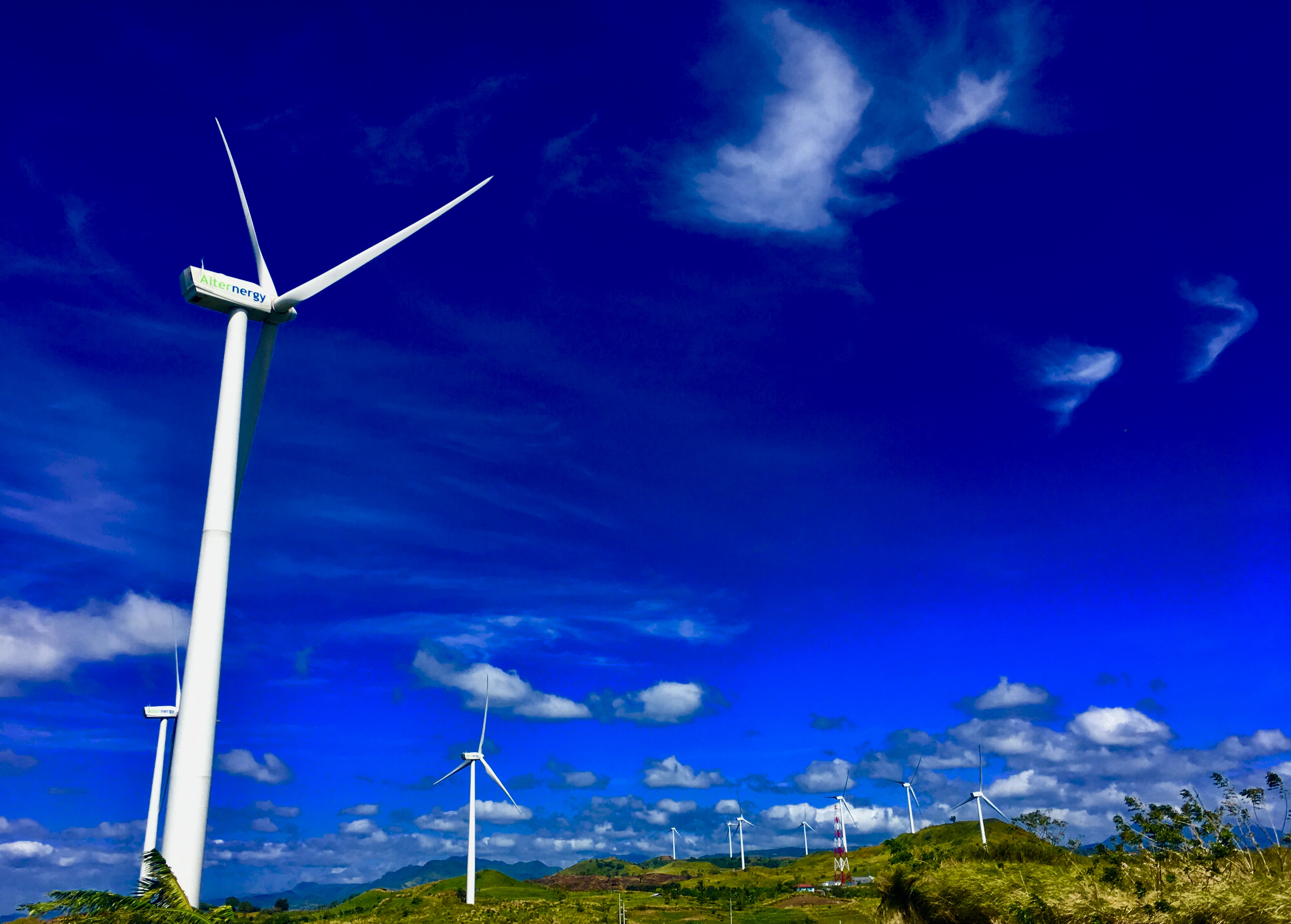
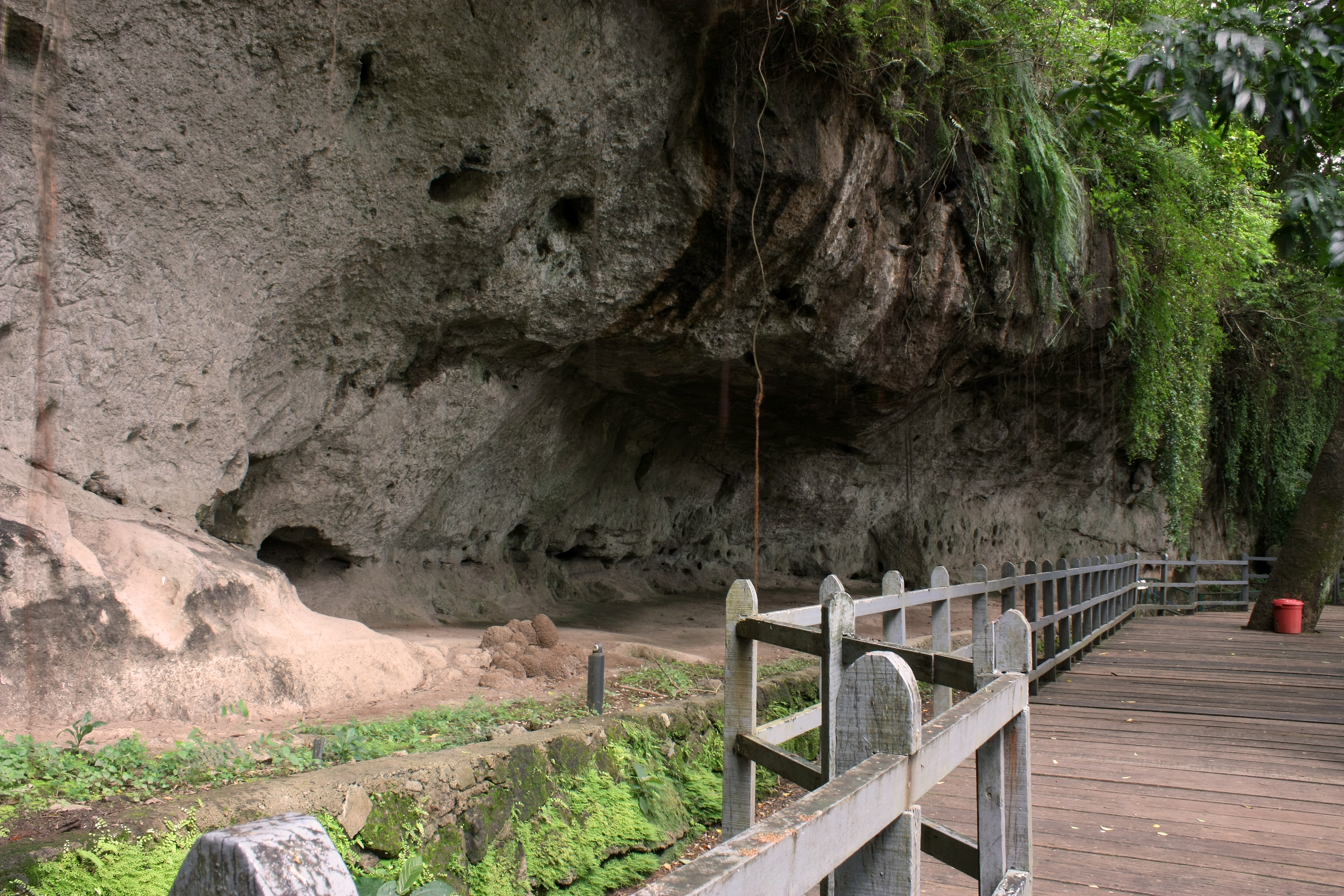
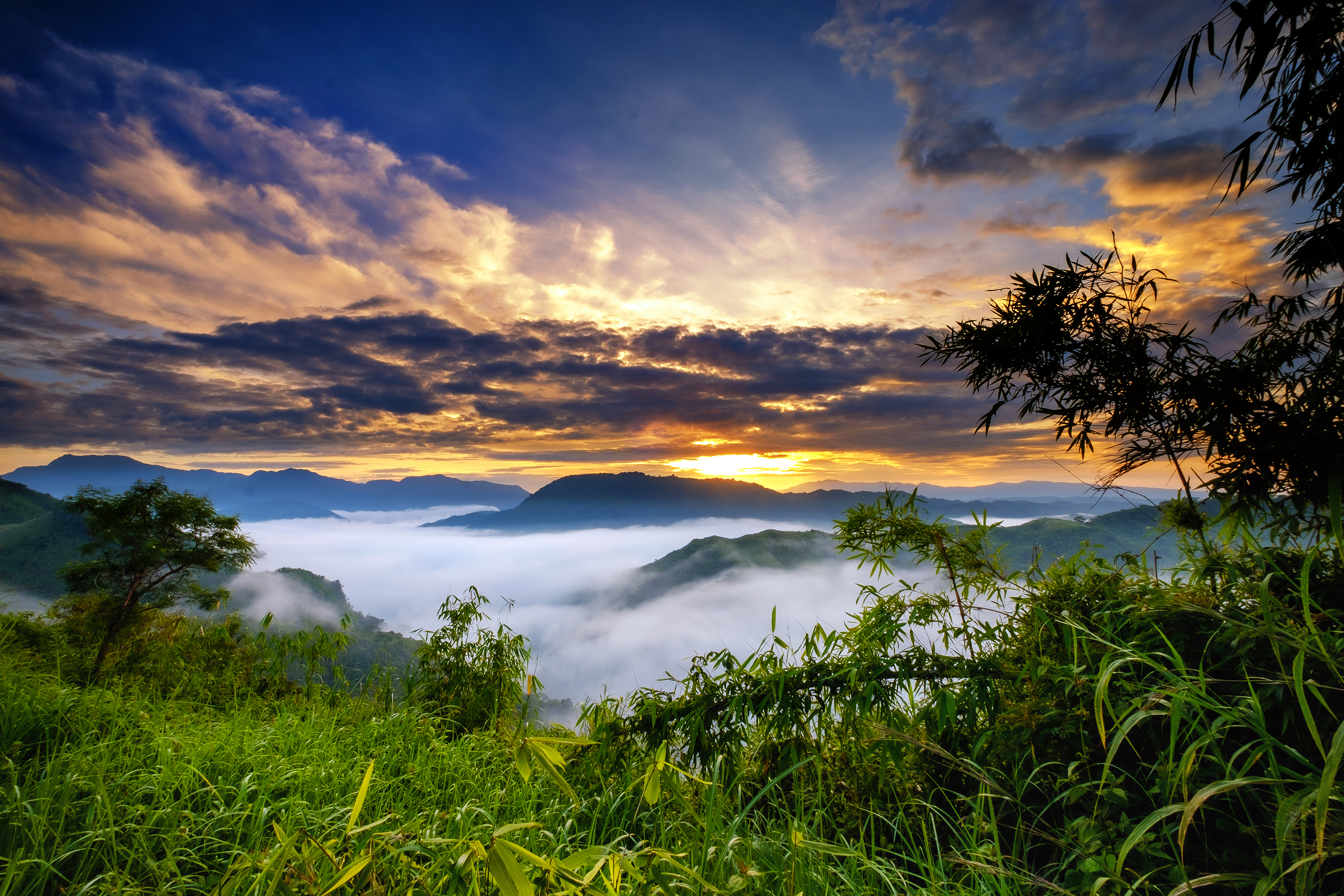
- (from top: left to right) Rizal Provincial Capitol, Masungi Georeserve, Hinulugang Taktak, Pililla Wind Farm, Angono Petroglyphs and Sierra Madre Mountains in Tanay.

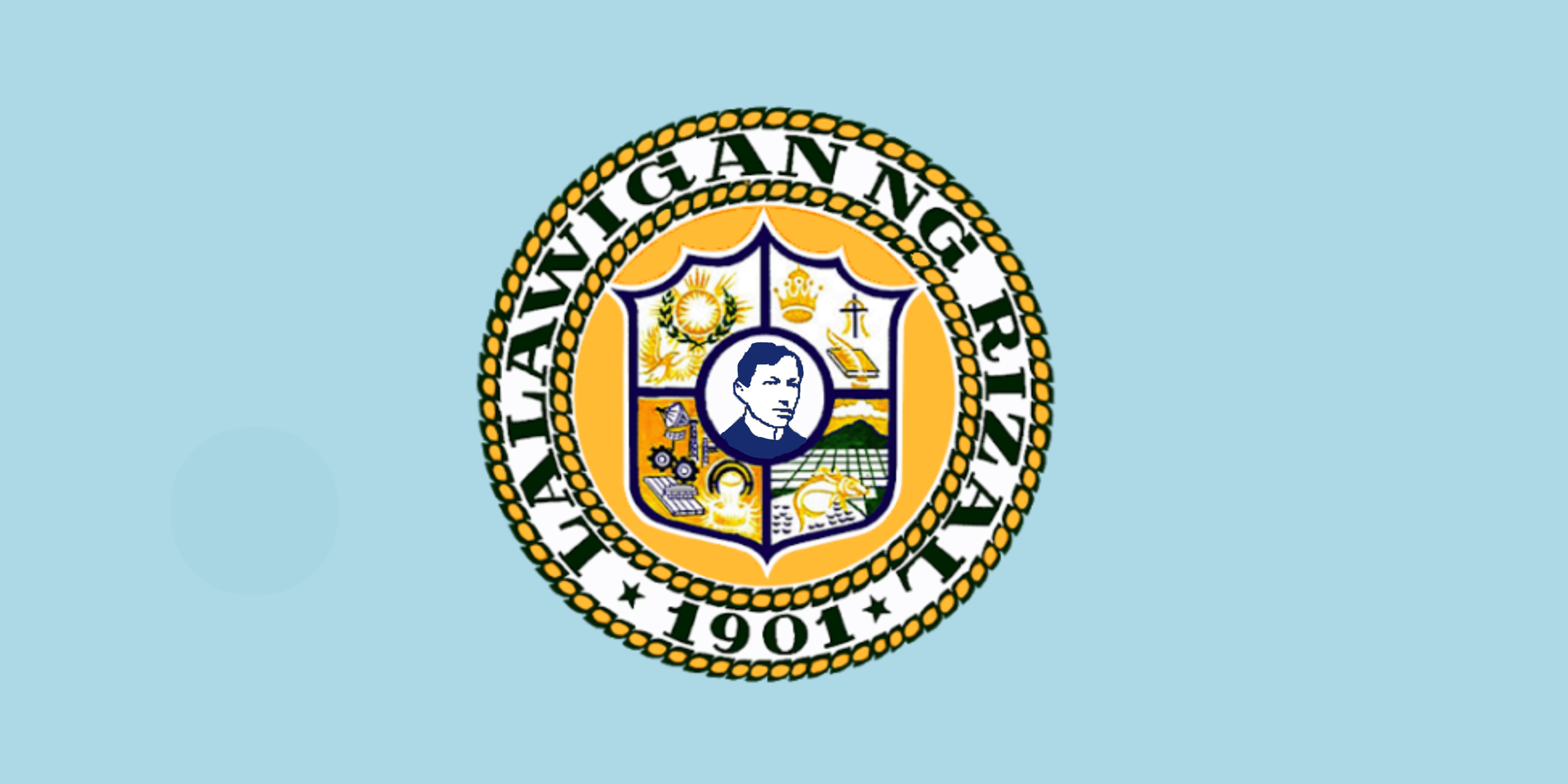
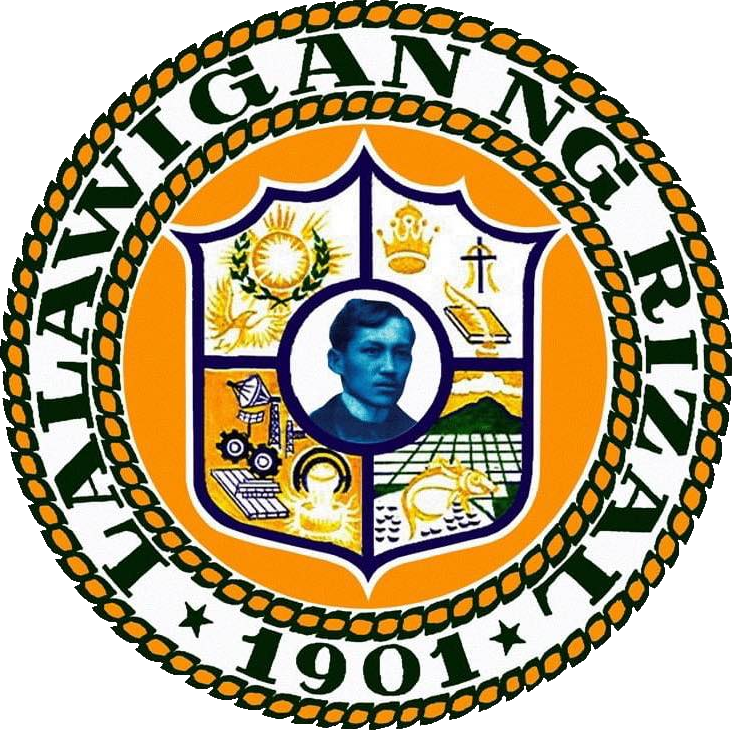
- Flag Seal
- Anthem: Rizal Mabuhay
- Location in the Philippines
- Interactive map of Rizal
- Coordinates: 14°40′N 121°15′E
- Country: Philippines
- Region: Calabarzon
- Founded: June 11, 1901
- Named for: José Rizal
- Capital and largest city: Antipolo

Government
  - Type: Sangguniang Panlalawigan
  - Governor: Nina Ricci A. Ynares-Chiongbian (NPC)
  - Vice Governor: Josefina G. Gatlabayan (NPC)
  - Legislature: Rizal Provincial Board
  - Electorate: 1,671,643 voters (2025)

Area
  - Total: 1,191.94 km^{2} (460.21 sq mi)
  - Rank: 73rd out of 82
- Highest elevation (Mount Irid): 1,509 m (4,951 ft)

Population (2024 census)
  - Total: 3,416,541
  - Rank: 5th out of 82
  - Density: 2,866.37/km^{2} (7,423.86/sq mi)
  - Rank: 1st out of 82
  - Households: 784,402
- Demonym: Rizaleño

Divisions
  - Independent cities: 0
  - Component cities: 1: Antipolo
  - Municipalities: 13: Angono; Baras; Binangonan; Cainta; Cardona; Jalajala; Morong; Pililla; Rodriguez; San Mateo; Tanay; Taytay; Teresa
  - Barangays: 189
  - Districts: Legislative districts of Rizal; Legislative districts of Antipolo

Economy
  - Income class: 1st provincial income class
  - Poverty incidence: 5.6% (2023)
  - Revenue: ₱ 7,777 million (2024)
  - Assets: ₱ 44,095 million (2024)
  - Expenditure: ₱ 4,261 million (2024)
  - Liabilities: ₱ 3,260 million (2024)
- Time zone: UTC+8 (PST)
- PSGC: 045800000
- IDD : area code: +63 (0)2
- ISO 3166 code: PH-RIZ
- Ethnic groups: Tagalog (81%); Ilocano (5%); Bicolano (4%); Bisaya (4%); Others (6%)
- Spoken languages: Tagalog; English; Filipino; Hatang Kayi; Cebuano; Waray; Bikol; Ilocano; Hiligaynon; others
- Website: rizalprovince.ph

Rizal, officially the Province of Rizal (Filipino: Lalawigan ng Rizal), is a province in the Philippines located in the Calabarzon region in Luzon. Its capital is the city of Antipolo. It is about 16 kilometers (9.9 mi) east of Manila. The province is named after José Rizal, one of the main national heroes of the Philippines. It is bordered by Metro Manila to the west, Bulacan to the north, Quezon to the east and Laguna to the southeast. The province also lies on the northern shores of Laguna de Bay, the largest lake in the country. Rizal is a mountainous province perched on the western slopes of the southern portion of the Sierra Madre mountain range.

Antipolo serves as the provincial capital since 2020, having been an administrative center since 2009 with the capitol located in the city. Previously, Pasig served as the capital, a designation it retained even after becoming part of the National Capital Region in 1975.

The province is a part of Greater Manila Area. It is the 5th largest province in the Philippines in terms of population.

== History ==
=== Early history ===
Tagalog settlement arrived sometime in the pre-Spanish period. The provincial territory began with the organization of the Tondo and Laguna provinces during the Spanish administration. Some of the towns like Pasig, Parañaque, Taytay and Cainta were already thriving.

=== Spanish colonial era ===
From the reports of the Encomiendas in 1582–1583, the Encomiendas of Moron (Morong) was under the jurisdiction of La Laguna and, the Encomiendas of Passi (Pasig), Taitay (Taytay) and Tagui (Taguig) belonged to the Province of Tondo. It was recorded that in 1591, the Encomiendas of Moron and Taitay were under the jurisdiction of the Franciscan Order in the Province of La Laguna; and the Encomiendas of Nabotas (Navotas), Tambobo (Malabon), Tondo, Parañaque (then La Huerta, Parañaque), Longalo (Don Galo, Parañaque), Tagui and Pasig were under the jurisdiction of the Augustinians in the Province of Tondo.

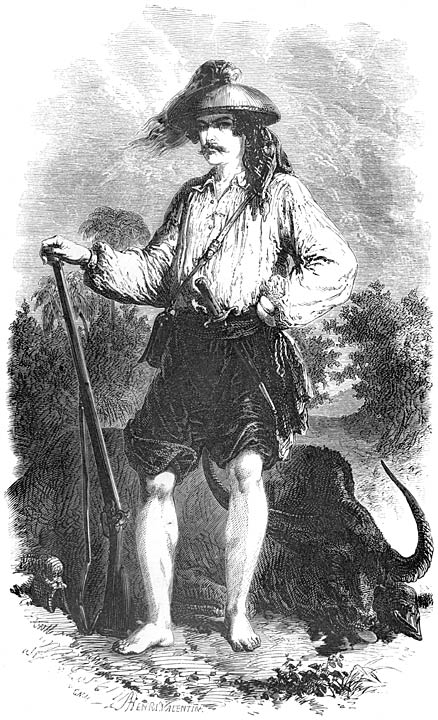
Paul de la Gironière established the Jala Jala hacienda in Morong.

In 1853, a new political subdivision named Distrito Politico-Militar de los Montes de San Mateo (transl. Political-Military District of the San Mateo Mountains) was formed. This consisted of the towns of Antipolo, Bosoboso, Cainta and Taytay from the Province of Tondo, and the towns of Morong, Baras, Tanay, Pililla, Angono, Binangonan and Jala-jala from the Province of La Laguna, with Morong as the capital. This district was changed to Distrito Politico-Militar de Morong four years later.

By virtue of Circular No. 83, dated September 2, 1859, the Province of Tondo became the Province of Manila. All its towns were placed under the administration, fiscal supervision and control of the Governor of the new province.

The town of Mariquina (Marikina) became the capital of the Province of Manila during the tenure of the revolutionary government of Gen. Emilio Aguinaldo. The Politico-Military District of Morong had for its capital the town of Antipolo from 1898 to 1899 and the town of Tanay from 1899 to 1900.

=== American colonial era ===
==== Foundation ====
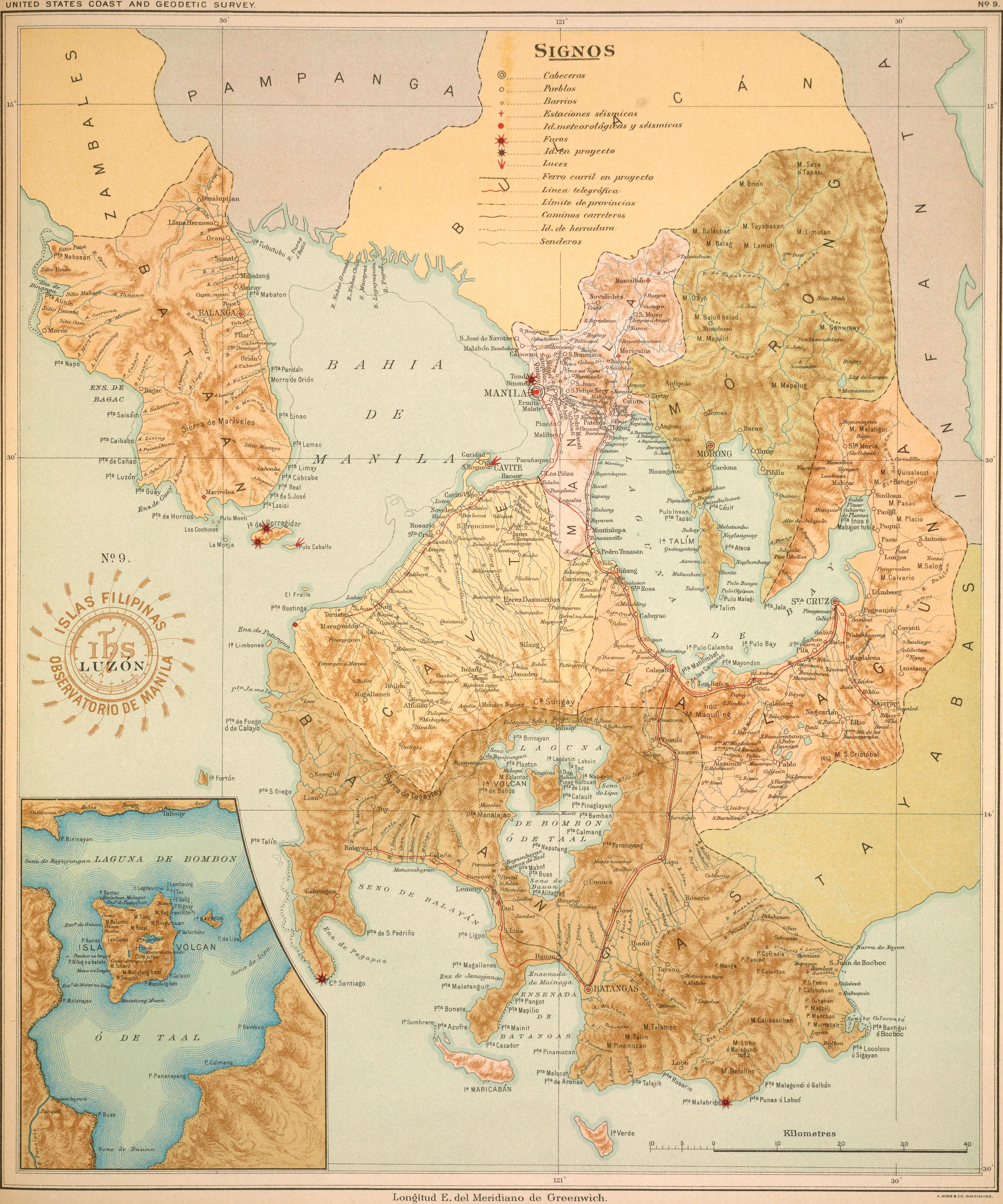
1899 map of south-central Luzon with Manila province and Morong district

On February 6, the First Philippine Commission sought to establish civil government in the country through a provincial organization act after the Filipino-Spanish and Filipino-American conflicts.

Therefore, on June 5, 1901, a historic meeting was held at the Pasig Catholic Church for the organization of a civil government in the Province of Manila and District of Morong, with 221 delegates in attendance. The first Philippine Commission, headed by William Howard Taft and composed of Commissioners Luke E. Wright, Henry C. Ide, Bernard Moses and Dean C. Worcester, discussed with the Assembly the issue of whether or not to write the Province of Manila with the District of Morong, was not self-sufficient to operate as a separate province.

Although the delegates from Morong, Hilarion Raymundo, and José Tupas, objected to the proposal, Juan Sumulong of Antipolo strongly advocated the move. After much acrimonious debate and upon the suggestion of Trinidad H. Pardo de Tavera the body agreed on the creation of a new province independent of the Province of Manila. The new province was aptly named after José Rizal, the country's national hero.

The ruins of the first provincial capitol in barangay Santa Rosa, Pasig, which was the seat of government for the province until 1950.

On June 11, 1901, the province of Rizal was officially and legally created by virtue of Act No. 137 by the First Philippine Commission which during the time was acting as the unicameral legislative body in the island of Luzon.

The new province was composed of 32 municipalities, 19 from the old Province of Manila (i.e. Cainta, Caloocan, Las Piñas, Malibay, Mariquina (Marikina), Montalban (Rodriguez), Muntinlupa, Navotas, Novaliches, Parañaque, Pasig, Pateros, Pineda (Pasay), San Felipe Neri (Mandaluyong), San Juan del Monte (San Juan), San Mateo, San Pedro Macati (Makati), Taguig, Tambobong (Malabon)); and 13 from the Politico-Military District of Morong (i.e. Angono, Antipolo, Baras, Binangonan, Bosoboso, Cardona, Jalajala, Morong, Pililla, Quisao, Tanay, Taytay and Teresa). The City of Manila from the old Province of Manila was treated as a separate entity. The seat of the provincial government was Pasig; however, for seven months in 1904, San Felipe Neri served as the provincial seat.

The number of municipalities changed with the municipal boundaries through time, mostly occurring within the provincial boundary. On October 12, 1903, the former municipalities of Bosoboso, Malibay, Novaliches and Quisao were absorbed by Antipolo, Pasay, Caloocan and Pililla, respectively, by virtue of Act No. 942. On November 25, 1903, Muntinlupa was ceded to the Province of La Laguna and became part of the municipality of Biñan, but was later returned to Rizal on March 22, 1905, and became part of Taguig until December 17, 1917.

Political map of Rizal before the creation of Quezon City

On October 12, 1939, Quezon City was established, which included parts of Caloocan, and later on, Novaliches and parts of Marikina, Pasig and San Juan.

=== Japanese occupation ===
Marking's and the Hunter's ROTC Guerrillas operated in Rizal throughout the war.

In 1942, Quezon City and the towns of Caloocan, Makati, Mandaluyong, Parañaque, Pasay, and San Juan were merged with Manila to form the City of Greater Manila, by virtue of Executive Order No. 400 signed by President Manuel L. Quezon as an emergency measure. The city was dissolved by President Sergio Osmeña in 1945, thus restoring the pre-war status of the merged cities and towns.

=== Philippine independence ===
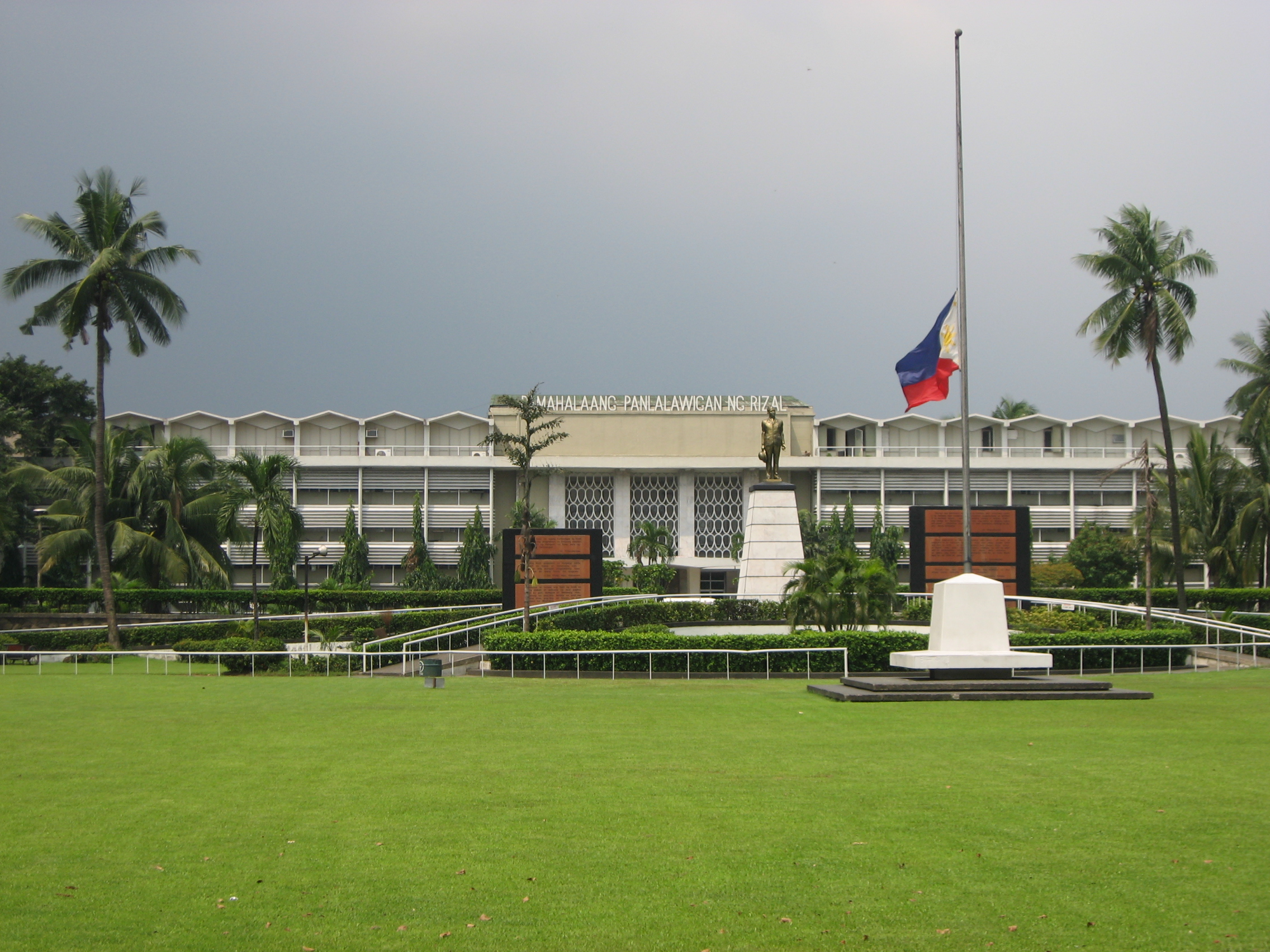
The second provincial capitol along Shaw Boulevard, Pasig was the seat of government for the province from 1962 to 2009. It was demolished in 2010 and the site was rebuilt as Capitol Commons.

Through Presidential Decree No. 824, Rizal was partitioned on November 7, 1975 to form Metropolitan Manila. The municipalities of Las Piñas, Parañaque, Muntinlupa, Taguig, Pateros, Makati, Mandaluyong, San Juan, Malabon, Navotas, Pasig and Marikina, and the three cities of Caloocan, Pasay and Quezon City were excised to form the new region, while the other 14 towns remained in Rizal.

President Ferdinand Marcos had issued Proclamation No. 1283 in June 1974 that declared thousands of hectares of the province's watershed reservation as a townsite reservation, and by April 1977, he established the "Lungsod Silangan" townsite with Proclamation No. 1637 that expanded the area coverage to more than 20,000 hectares. Intended to capture the spillover of industrial growth in Metro Manila, the Lungsod Silangan area covered portions of the municipalities of Antipolo, San Mateo, and Montalban along the Marikina–Infanta Highway, and was part of Imelda Marcos' "humanist" program for Metro Manila to serve as "the nucleus from which all humanist progress and development shall radiate towards the rest of the metropolis and the country."

=== Contemporary ===
On June 17, 2008, Governor Casimiro Ynares III announced the transfer of the provincial capitol from Pasig to Antipolo. The new ₱270-million capitol building, constructed by Ortigas & Co., owner thereof, was completed by December of that year. Built on a 5-hectare (12-acre) lot near the Ynares Center, it was inaugurated on March 4, 2009, bringing back the Capitol Building inside the provincial territory from which it was absent for 34 years (when Pasig was incorporated into Metro Manila).

On June 19, 2020, President Rodrigo Duterte signed Republic Act No. 11475 into law, which officially transferred the provincial capital of Rizal from Pasig to Antipolo. The law was published on June 22, 2020, and took effect on July 7, 2020. The publication of the law coincided with the 159th birth anniversary of Dr. Jose Rizal.

== Geography ==
Rizal covers a total area of 1,182.65 square kilometers (456.62 sq mi) occupying the northern-central section of the Calabarzon in Luzon. The province is bordered on the north by Bulacan, east by Quezon, southeast by Laguna, south by Laguna de Bay, and west by Metro Manila.

Located 20 kilometers (12 mi) east of Manila, commuters take approximately an hour to reach the provincial seat which is in Antipolo. Generally hilly and mountainous in terrain, most of the province's southern towns lie in the shores of Laguna de Bay, the country's largest inland body of water.

Talim Island, the largest island situated within Laguna de Bay, is under the jurisdiction of the province and shared by the municipalities of Binangonan and Cardona.

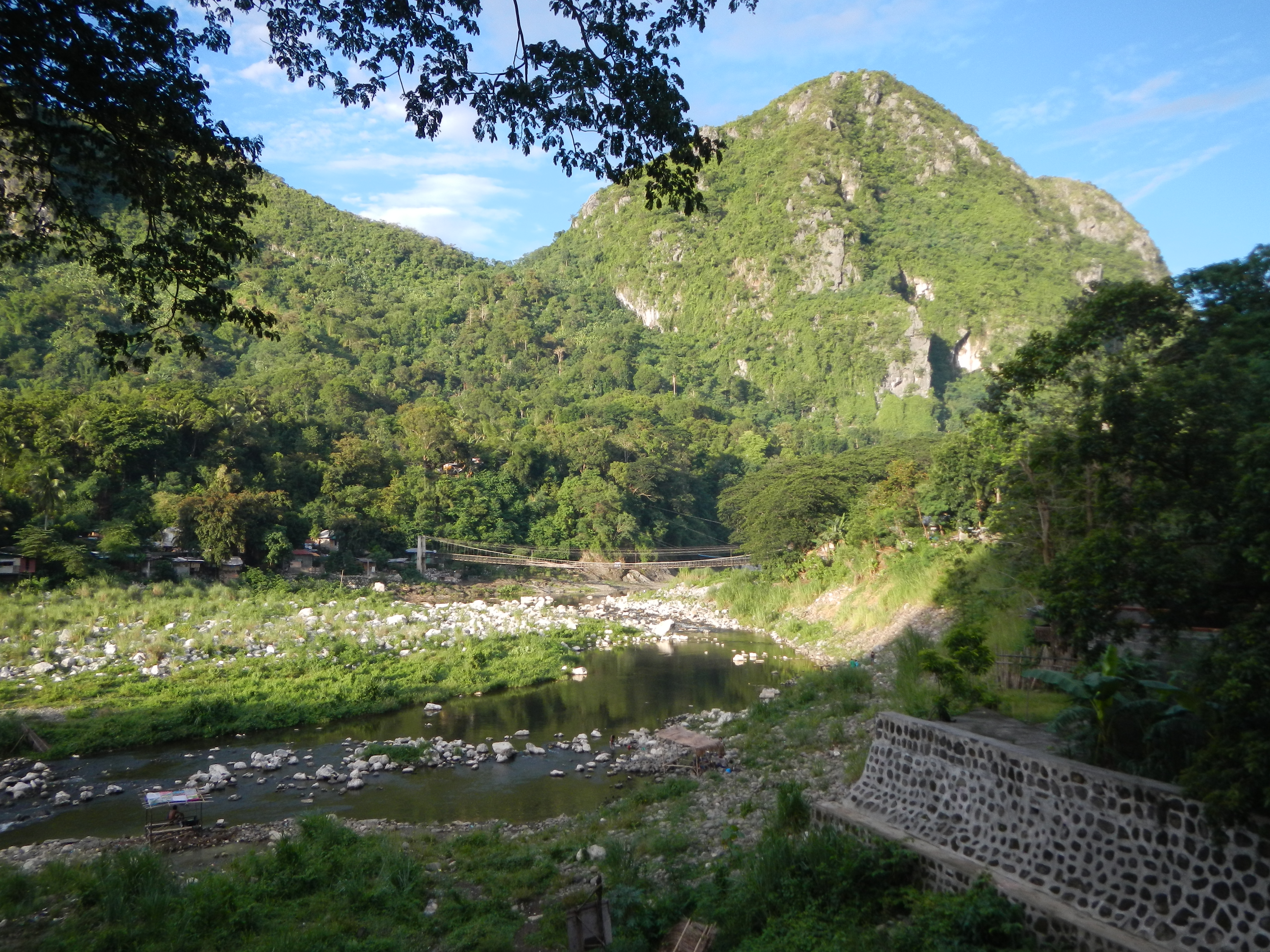
Mountainous terrain in Rodriguez

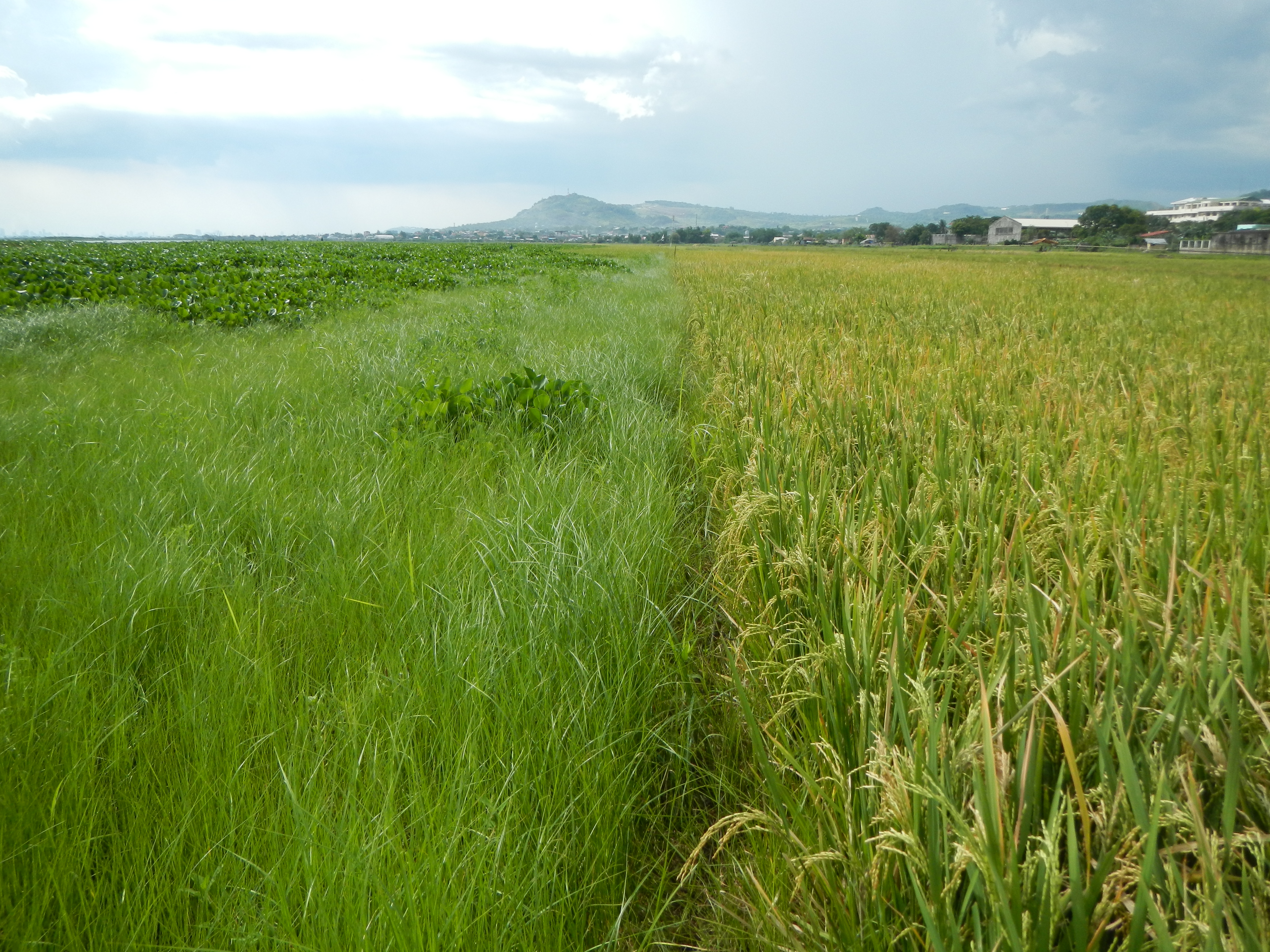
Rice fields in Binangonan

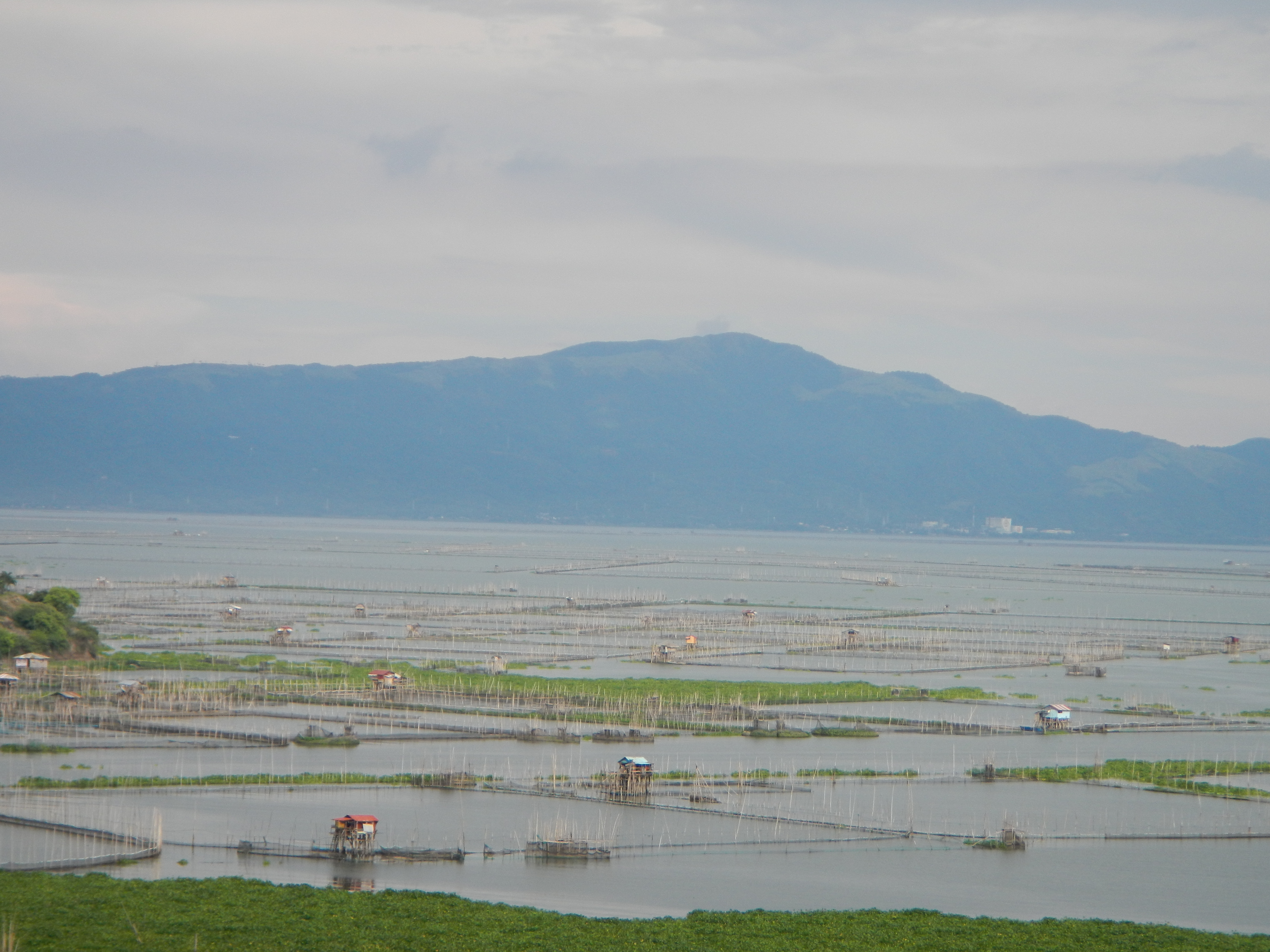
Laguna de Bay as seen from Cardona

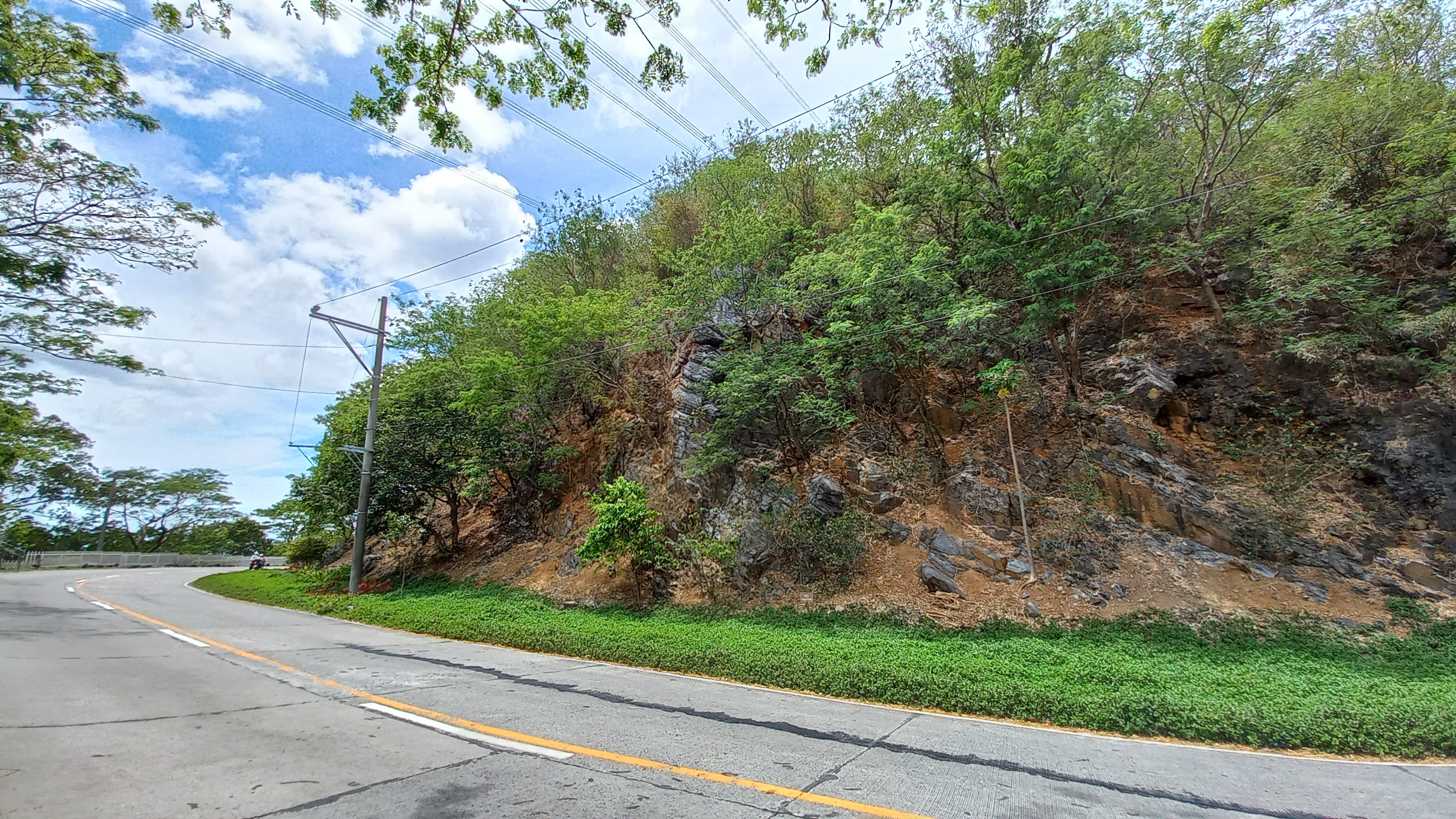
Limestone outcrop along the Marilaque Highway in Tanay

=== Climate ===
Climate data for Rizal
Month	Jan	Feb	Mar	Apr	May	Jun	Jul	Aug	Sep	Oct	Nov	Dec	Year
Mean daily maximum °C (°F)	30.5 (86.9)	31.5 (88.7)	33.1 (91.6)	34.5 (94.1)	34.0 (93.2)	32.6 (90.7)	32.0 (89.6)	31.2 (88.2)	31.4 (88.5)	31.6 (88.9)	31.4 (88.5)	30.5 (86.9)	32.0 (89.7)
Mean daily minimum °C (°F)	21.6 (70.9)	21.8 (71.2)	22.9 (73.2)	24.1 (75.4)	25.0 (77.0)	25.0 (77.0)	24.6 (76.3)	24.8 (76.6)	24.3 (75.7)	24.0 (75.2)	23.5 (74.3)	22.3 (72.1)	23.7 (74.6)
Average rainy days	5	3	4	5	13	20	22	22	22	17	15	8	156
Source: Storm247

=== Administrative divisions ===
Rizal comprises 13 municipalities and 1 city.

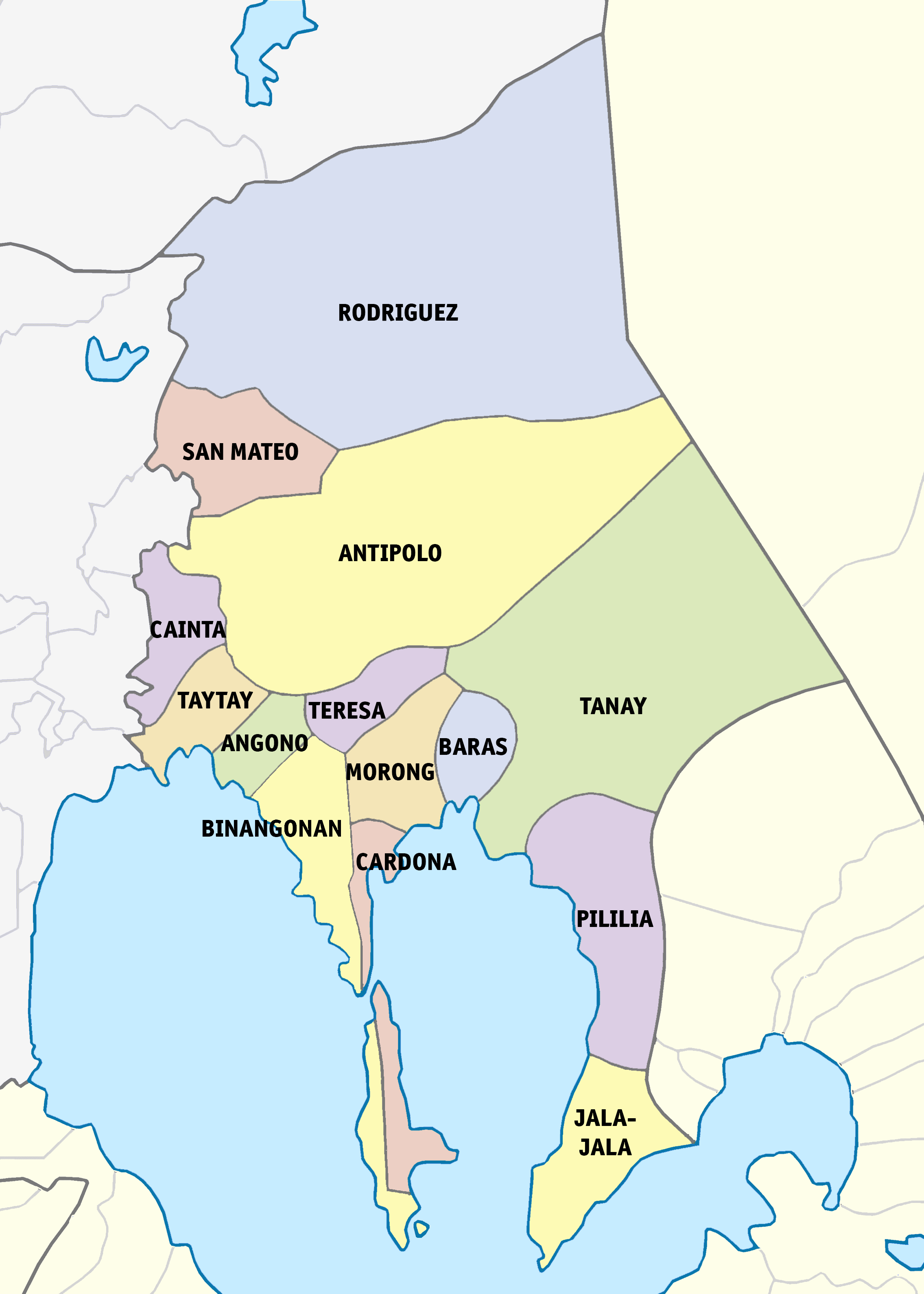
Political map of Rizal

- † Provincial capital and component city
- Municipality

City or municipality		District	Population				±% p.a.	Area		Density		Barangay	Coordinates^{[A]}
			(2020)		(2015)	(2010)		km^{2}	sq mi	/km^{2}	/sq mi		
Angono		1st	3.9%	130,494	113,283	102,407	2.87%	26.22	10.12	4,300	11,000	10	14°31′31″N 121°09′12″E
Antipolo	†	2 LD	26.6%	887,399	776,386	677,741	3.07%	306.10	118.19	2,500	6,500	16	14°35′13″N 121°10′33″E
Baras		2nd	2.6%	87,637	69,300	32,609	5.46%	84.93	32.79	820	2,100	10	14°31′18″N 121°15′57″E
Binangonan		1st	9.4%	313,631	282,474	249,872	2.40%	66.34	25.61	4,300	11,000	40	14°27′54″N 121°11′32″E
Cainta		1st	11.3%	376,933	322,128	311,845	3.62%	42.99	16.60	7,500	19,000	7	14°34′48″N 121°06′55″E
Cardona		2nd	1.5%	50,143	49,034	47,414	0.51%	19.27	7.44	2,500	6,500	18	14°29′06″N 121°13′49″E
Jalajala		2nd	1.0%	34,017	32,254	30,074	1.21%	44.12	17.03	730	1,900	11	14°21′17″N 121°19′29″E
Morong		2nd	2.1%	71,151	58,118	52,194	4.69%	37.58	14.51	1,500	3,900	8	14°30′54″N 121°14′17″E
Pililla		2nd	2.1%	71,535	64,812	59,527	2.26%	69.95	27.01	930	2,400	9	14°28′52″N 121°18′27″E
Rodriguez		4th	13.3%	443,954	369,222	280,904	4.26%	312.70	120.73	2,100	5,400	11	14°43′52″N 121°08′43″E
San Mateo		3rd	8.2%	273,306	252,527	205,255	1.81%	55.09	21.27	4,600	12,000	15	14°41′40″N 121°07′05″E
Tanay		2nd	4.2%	139,420	117,830	98,879	3.88%	200.00	77.22	590	1,500	20	14°29′54″N 121°17′06″E
Taytay		1st	11.6%	386,451	319,104	288,956	4.43%	38.80	14.98	8,200	21,000	5	14°34′10″N 121°07′57″E
Teresa		2nd	1.9%	64,072	57,755	47,163	2.38%	18.61	7.19	3,400	8,800	9	14°33′38″N 121°12′27″E
Total				3,330,143	2,884,227	2,484,840	2.88%	1,182.65	456.62	2,400	6,200	189	(see GeoGroup box)
1. Coordinates mark the city/town center, and are sortable by latitude.

== Demographics ==
Population census of Rizal (province)
Year	Pop.	±% p.a.
1903	72,628	—
1918	106,921	+2.61%
1939	194,158	+2.88%
1948	265,256	+3.53%
1960	567,283	+6.54%
1970	1,152,200	+7.33%
1975	1,558,883	+6.25%
1980	555,533	−18.64%
1990	977,448	+5.81%
1995	1,312,489	+5.68%
2000	1,707,218	+5.80%
2007	2,298,691	+4.19%
2010	2,484,840	+2.87%
2015	2,884,227	+2.88%
2020	3,330,143	+3.07%
2024	3,416,541	+0.62%
Figures prior to 1980 include areas that became part of Metro Manila. Source: Philippine Statistics Authority

=== Population ===
Population by ethnicity (2020)
Ethnicity	Population
Tagalog	2,045,844 (61.6%)
Bisaya	414,728 (12.49%)
Bicolano	292,728 (8.81%)
Ilocano	141,134 (4.25%)
Hiligaynon	107,416 (3.23%)
Waray	107,303 (3.23%)
Pangasinan	40,597 (1.22%)
Cebuano	36,057 (1.09%)
Others	135,405 (4.08%)
Not Reported	115 (0%)

The population of Rizal in the 2024 census was 3,416,541 people, with a density of 2,900 inhabitants per square kilometer or 7,500 inhabitants per square mile.

=== Languages ===
Due to its location being in the heart of the Katagalugan, almost all of the residents of Rizal mainly speak Tagalog. English and Filipino are used as second languages respectively; Filipino is a version of Tagalog which is spoken by residents of Rizal in code switching & when speaking to Tagalog speakers of other dialects. Being bordered by Metro Manila (whose majority of its cities were once part of Rizal), a large number of people from farther provinces have migrated to the province, resulting in minor but significant usage of the Bicolano, Cebuano, various Cordilleran languages, Cuyunon, Ilocano, Hiligaynon, Kapampangan, Karay-a, Pangasinan and Waray, as well as various Lumad (indigenous languages in Mindanao) languages, Iranun, Maranao, Maguindanaon and Tausug languages.

=== Religion ===
==== Catholicism ====
Roman Catholicism is the predominant religion with about 80 percent adherence.

==== Iglesia Ni Cristo ====
Iglesia Ni Cristo is a religious minority in Rizal, it has numerous chapels scattered around its municipalities. Subdivided in 2 Ecclesiastical Districts, its members comprises the 5% of the province's population.

==== Others ====
Various Christian groups exist such as Members Church of God International (MCGI), Oneness Apostolic or Pentecostal like UPC, ALJC and ACJC, Iglesia Filipina Independiente, Born-again Christians, Jesus Is Lord Church Worldwide, Jehovah's Witnesses, Baptist, Church of Christ of Latter Day Saints, El Shaddai (movement) Methodists, Presbyterians, Seventh-day Adventist and other Evangelical Christians. Muslims, Anitists, animists, and atheists are also present in the province.

== Economy ==
Poverty incidence of Rizal (%)

Source: Philippine Statistics Authority

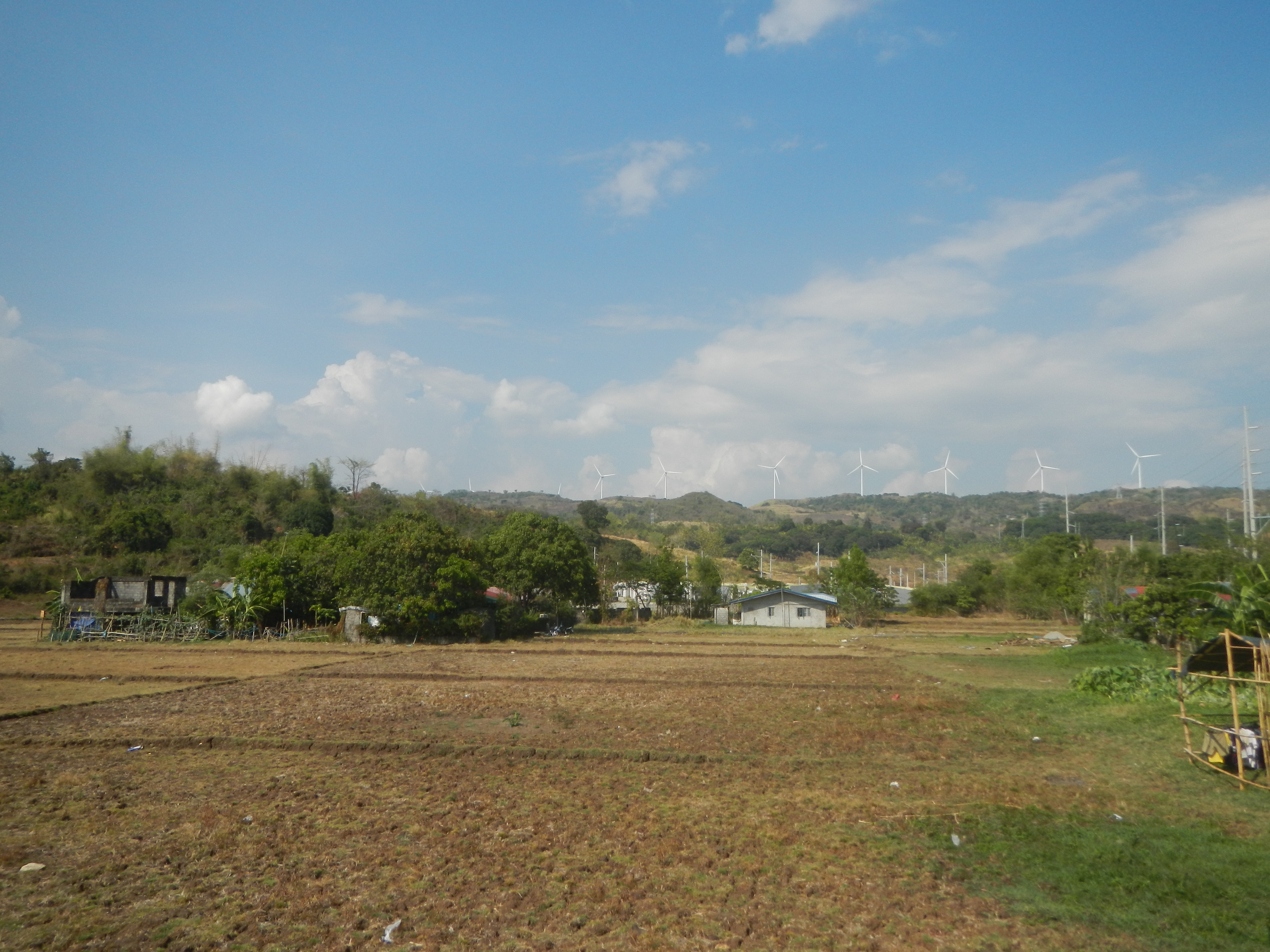
Agricultural field in Pililla

Before the 1990s, the primary source of economy in Rizal province were the huge piggery estates owned by Manila-based families. In recent years, the province became one of the most progressive provinces in the country, owing to its proximity to Metro Manila, the economic center of the Philippines. Antipolo, Taytay and Cainta serve as the economic centers of the province, while Angono, Rodriguez, Morong, San Mateo, Tanay, Binangonan and Teresa are taking successful steps to urbanize areas within their jurisdiction. Other areas of the province are having difficulty to start the urbanization process, mainly because of the lack of main roads to connect these to economic centers.

In a study recently conducted by the National Statistics Coordination Board (NSCB), Rizal province came out to be the Philippines' least poor province with a poverty incidence rate of 3.4%, even lower than that of the National Capital Region or Metro Manila.. On April 23, 2013, the National Statistics Coordination Board (NCSB) reported that Rizal, from being the least poor province in poverty incidence moved down to the 3rd Place, with Cavite taking over as the least province by 4.1% (compared to Rizal's 7.6%) and Laguna for 2nd with 6.3%.

Antipolo, the province's capital city, is the center of trade and exchange, tourism, government, and economy. It is also a center of education and sports because of the availability of various educational and physical training facilities. Acclaimed of its scenic attractions, the city also produces agricultural products such as cashew nuts and rice cakes. Taytay, the province's center of garment and textile manufacturing, is also the town where the country's largest mall operator runs a store near the town center. Meanwhile, Cainta serves as the center of business-process outsourcing (BPO) businesses in the province, aside from being known for the presence of several shopping centers and delicacies such as bibingka or rice cakes.

== Points of interest ==
City or municipality	Points of interest
Antipolo (25 km from Manila)	Important Road Networks: Marcos Highway; Sumulong Hi-way; Ortigas Avenue Extension; Cabrera Road (via Taytay); Antipolo Cathedral — the shrine of Our Lady of Peace and Good Voyage, also known as the Virgin of Antipolo and the seat of the Roman Catholic Diocese of Antipolo; Hinulugang Taktak National Park — once a popular summer get-away and is being restored to become again one of the city's primary attractions; Suman — a local delicacy made out of glutinous rice; Bosoboso Church — built by the Jesuit priests in 1700 under the Patron of Nuestra Senora de la Anunciata; Rizal Provincial Capitol — seat of the provincial government of Rizal; Ynares Center Antipolo — an indoor sporting arena; Pinto Art Museum — a contemporary art museum
Angono (30 km from Manila)	Important Road Networks: Manila East Road (via Pasig, Cainta, and Taytay through Ortigas Avenue Extension); Quezon Avenue; Taytay-Angono Coastal Road (in Baytown); Angono Street Mural; Ancestral Home of Carlos "Botong" Francisco, National Artist for Visual Arts; Blanco Family Museum; Nemiranda Museum; The Second Gallery Museum; Orville Tiamson Museum; Balaw-Balaw Restaurant; Angono Petroglyphs — the oldest known of art in the Philippines; Higantes Festival — celebrated every November 23 in honor of their patron saint St. Clement. Higantes are made of bamboo and colorful cloth and its faces of paper mache.
Baras (48 km from Manila)	Important Road Networks: J.P. Rizal Street; Manila East Road via Morong; Marcos Highway; Baras-Pinugay Road; Palo Alto Falls and Leisure Park — a thousand feet falls. One has to climb up 249 steps to get to the foot of the falls; Saint Joseph Parish — has been a setting of different films and TV Programs; Sikaran — one of the Philippine's native martial arts
Binangonan (32 km from Manila)	Important Road Networks: Manila East Road (via Angono); J.P. Rizal Avenue; Rodriguez in Talim Island; Santa Ursula Parish — 400-year-old church; Talim Island — a dagger-shaped island at the heart of Laguna de Bay; Mt. Tagapo — located in Talim Island, a 270-metre (890 ft) mountain also known as "Bundok ng Susong Birhen"
Cainta (21 km from Manila)	Important Road Networks: Ortigas Avenue Extension (via Pasig); Marcos Highway; Felix Avenue; A. Bonifacio Avenue; Our Lady of Light Parish — one of the oldest churches in the province; Hunters ROTC Monument — a memorial for the Hunters ROTC guerrillas of World War II; Cenakulo — the actual portrayal of the Passion of Christ on the streets
Cardona (42 km from Manila)	Important Road Networks Manila East Road (via Binangonan): Kaluskos Kawayan — a showcase displayed every December; Sapao-An Festival — feast of Our Lady of the Most Holy Rosary celebrated during the 7th of October; Rock Garden — features hundreds of large stones formed by nature
Jalajala (69 km from Manila)	Important Road Networks Pililla-Jalajala-Pakil Road: D'Dalaylay Festival — celebrated every September 29 features street dances with colorful and artistic costumes
Morong (45 km from Manila)	Important Road Networks Manila East Road (via Cardona): U-ugong Park — formerly a well-known rice field and has a majestic waterfalls; now a resort owned by a local artist; Saint Jerome Parish Church — built in 1615 by a Chinese craftsmen. A first class relic of Saint Jerome was also in the church.
Pililla (53 km from Manila)	Important Road Networks: Manila East Road (via Tanay); Pililla-Jalajala-Pakil Road; Bahay na Bato — believed to be as old as more than a hundred years; Pililla Rizal Wind Farms — built by AltEnergy to give electricity to the whole Barangay Halayhayin and Metro Manila as well. This also serves as a tourist attraction, and is located on the mountains near Laguna de Bay.Tiger Sanctuary also known as "pililla zoo"
Rodriguez (38 km from Manila)	Important Road Networks: Rodriguez Road; Mayon Avenue; Rizal Avenue; Payatas Road (via Quezon City); M.H. del Pilar Street; Avilon Zoo — a 7.5-hectare (19-acre) zoo located in Barrio San Isidro and operated by the Avilon Wildlife Conservation Foundation; Montalban Gorge — two white rock mountains of boulders with a very steep gorge in between located in the Pamitinan Protected Landscape; Pamitinan Cave — an important historical site located in the Pamitinan Protected Landscape where Andres Bonifacio declared independence from Spain in 1895; Wawa Dam — an abandoned dam which is now a tourist destination located in the Pamitinan Protected Landscape
San Mateo (24 km from Manila)	Important Road Networks: Gen. Luna Avenue; Batasan-San Mateo Road; JFD Road; Diocesan Shrine of Our Lady of Aranzazu; Kakanin Festival; 9 waves Resort
Tanay (57 km from Manila)	Important Road Networks: Manila East Road (via Baras); Sampaloc Road; Ortigas Avenue Extension (via Antipolo); Marcos Highway (via Antipolo); Calinawan Cave — housed the townspeople during the Second World War; Daranak Falls and Batlag Falls — the two most popular tourist attractions in Tanay; Masungi Georeserve — interesting place to hikers and geologists; Parola — the historic lighthouse of Tanay; San Ildefonso Parish Church — built between 1773-1783; the second oldest church in the province; Regina Rica — a 71-foot (22 m) statue of the Queen of the Holy Rosary; Ten Cents to Heaven — holds the record of longest zip line (230 meters or 750 feet) in Rizal; Daraitan River — one of the country's cleanest rivers; PHILCOMSAT — the owner of a parcel of land situated in Barrio Pinugay, Barangay Tandang Kutyo, Tanay where its Philippine Space Communications Center (PSCC) is located. The PSCC, which principally consists of herein respondent’s satellite earth station, serves as the communications gateway of the Philippines to more than two-thirds of the world. Incidentally, the property had been planted with fruit trees, rice and corn by farmers occupying the surrounding areas of the PSCC.
Taytay (19 km from Manila)	Important Road Networks: Ortigas Avenue Extension (via Pasig, and Cainta); Rizal Avenue; Manila East Road; Highway 2000 (Phase 1 and 2); Taytay Tiangge — There are around 10 garments center operating in Club Manila East Compound. Each garment center has hundreds to thousands of stalls selling different clothes by family owned garment factories.; Tres Escalon Waterfalls and Maharlika Falls — two known natural waterfalls in the mountainous portion of Taytay; Christ the King Parish — well-known to be the "Church in the Sky" because of its location
Teresa (29 km from Manila)	Important Road Networks: Ortigas Avenue Extension (via Pasig, Cainta, Taytay, and Antipolo); Turumba Festival — held every August 23 for the patron saint of Teresa, Santa Rosa de Lima

== Government ==
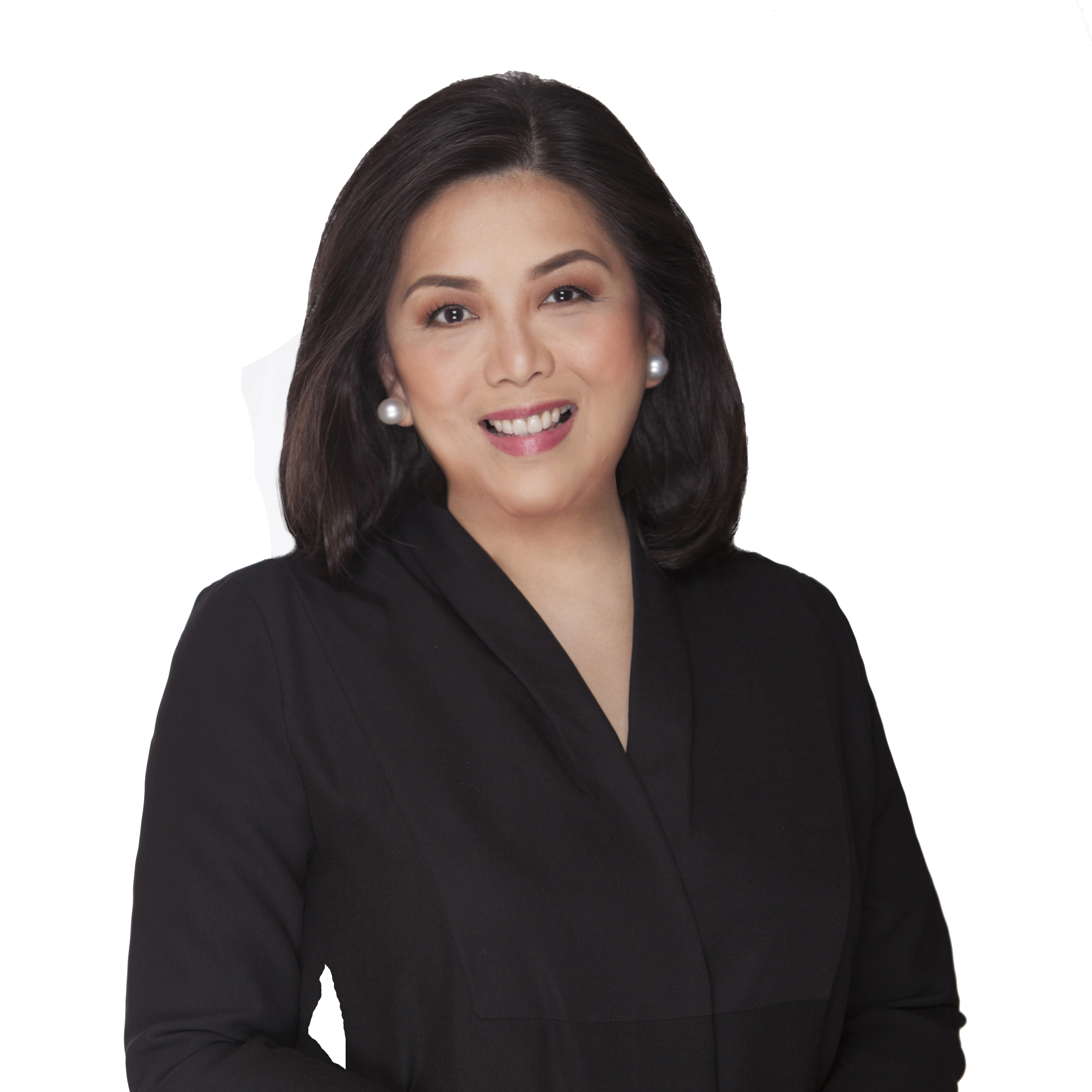
Governor
Nina Ynares

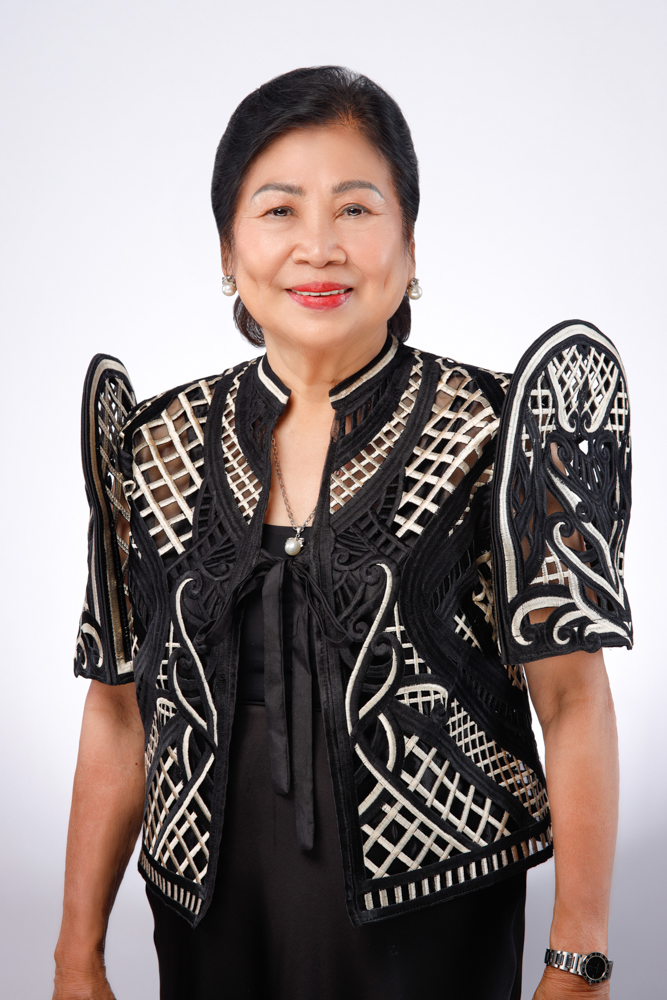
Vice Governor
Pining Gatlabayan

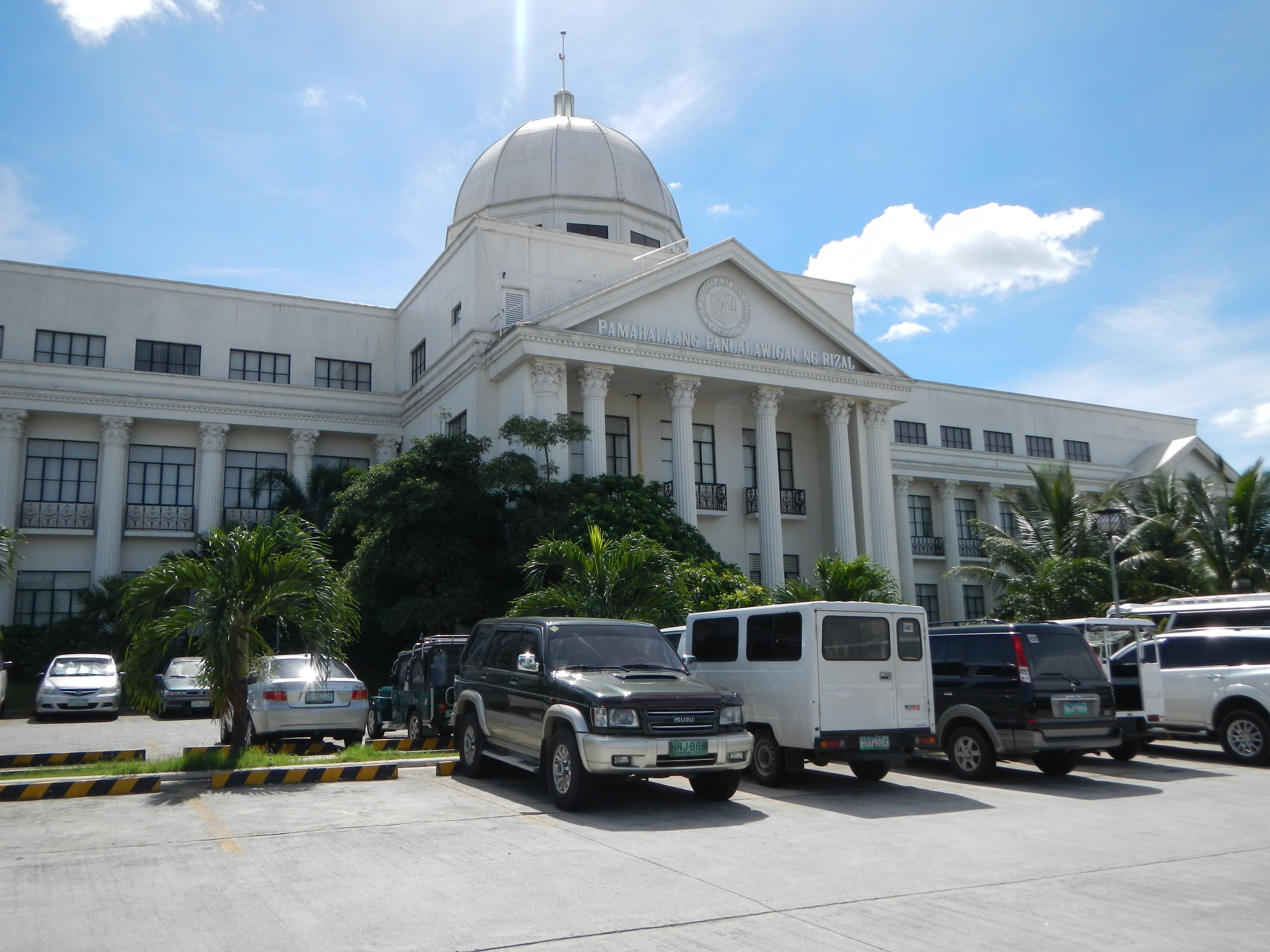
The new provincial capitol in Antipolo

The provincial legislature or the Sangguniang Panlalawigan is composed of ten elected members. Effective 2022, four members are elected from each of the province's first legislative district, two from the second district, and one each from the third and fourth legislative districts and Antipolo's first and second legislative districts.

=== Incumbent officials ===
- Governor: Nina A. Ynares-Chiongbian (NPC)
- Vice Governor: Josefina Galang-Gatlabayan (NPC)
- Board Members:

District	Board member	Party
Rizal–1st	Anthony Jesus S. Alarcon	NPC
Rizal–1st	Philip Jeison J. Cruz	NPC
Rizal–1st	Maria Charis Kay S. Ilagan-Conde	NPC
Rizal–1st	Patnubay B. Tiamson	NP
Rizal–2nd	Ricardo S. Bernados	NPC
Rizal–2nd	Reynaldo H. San Juan Jr.	PFP
Rizal–3rd	John Patrick M. Bautista	PDP
Rizal–4th	Rafhael Roumel V. Ayuson	NPC
Antipolo–1st	Reynaldo Nicolas R. Puno	NUP
Antipolo–2nd	Danilo O. Leyble	NPC
League	Board member	Party
ABC	Moses M. San Jose	Nonpartisan
PCL	Hector M. Robles	NPC
SK	King Arvi A. Ramilo	Nonpartisan
Sector	Board member	Party
IPMR	Reynaldo U. Doroteo	Nonpartisan

=== Representatives ===
From left to right: 1st district to 4th district
- Elected Representatives
  - 1st District: Rebecca Maria A. Ynares (NPC)
  - 2nd District: Emigdio P. Tanjuatco III (NPC)
  - 3rd District: Jose Arturo S. Garcia Jr. (NPC)
  - 4th District: Dennis L. Hernandez (NPC)

== Notable personalities ==
=== National heroes and patriots ===
- Licerio Gerónimo (1855–1924) – Philippine Revolutionary General (Rodriguez)
- Tomás Claudio (1892–1918) – Filipino soldier who enlisted in the U.S. Army during the First World War. He was considered as the first Filipino to die overseas during an international conflict. (Morong)
- Ambrosio Flores (1843–1912) – Filipino general in the Philippine Revolution and the first governor of the province of Rizal.

=== Arts ===
- Carlos “Botong” Francisco (1912–1969) – National Artist of the Philippines for Visual Arts – Painting (Angono)
- Lucio San Pedro (1913–2002) – National Artist of the Philippines for Music (Angono)
- Vicente Manansala (1910–1981) – National Artist of the Philippines for Visual Arts – Painting (Binangonan)
- Francisco Feliciano (1941–2014) – National Artist of the Philippines for Music (Morong)
- Juan Senson (1846-1927) – Tandang Juancho, "Grand Old Man of Art" widely known in Spanish Era(Angono)
- Nemesio Miranda (born 1949) – painter and sculptor (Angono)
- Rodel Tapaya (born 1980) – painter (Rodriguez)
- JC Jacinto (born 1985) – visual artist (Cainta)
- Jesse Santos (1928–2013) – Filipino comic-book artist (Teresa)
- Ligaya Tiamson-Rubin – writer and educator (Angono)
- Jose Antonio Vargas (born 1981) – journalist, filmmaker, and immigration rights activist in the United States (Antipolo)

=== Entertainment ===
- Malupiton (born 1998) – Joel Ravanera, social media personality, content creator and entertainer (Angono)
- Herlene Budol (born 1999) – actress and comedian (Angono)
- Vince Maristela - actor (Cainta)
- Mike Tan (born 1987) – actor (Angono)
- Zorayda Sanchez (1951-2008) - comedian, actress, television and film scriptwriter (Angono)
- Power Duo - Filipino dance couple composed of An Jeaneth Portales-Minor and Jervin Minor, Pilipinas Got Talent season 5 grand champion (Angono)
- Betong Sumaya (born 1975) - actor (Antipolo)
- Francis Magalona (1964–2009) – actor, rapper, musician, producer, television host. (Antipolo)
- Yassi Pressman (born 1995) – actress, singer and dancer (Antipolo)
- Kristel de Catalina (born 1985) – spiral pole dancer, Pilipinas Got Talent season 6 grand champion (Antipolo)
- Marco Masa (born 2007) – former child and current teen actor (Antipolo)
- Rocco Nacino (born 1987) – actor (Antipolo)
- Ai-Ai delas Alas (born 1964) – actress/comedienne (Cainta)
- Bea Alonzo (born 1987) – Actress, and businesswoman. (Cainta)
- Camille Prats (born 1985) – actress, model (Cainta)
- Aster Amoyo (born 1956) – television host, talent manager, columnist (Cainta)
- Amy Perez (born 1969) – actress, host (Cainta)
- Yeng Constantino (born 1988) – singer-songwriter, Pinoy Dream Academy season 1 grand champion (Rodriguez)
- Makisig Morales (born 1996) – former child actor (San Mateo)
- Alice Dixson (born 1969) – Actress, Philippines' representative for Miss International in 1986 (Taytay)
- Toni Gonzaga-Soriano (born 1984) – Actress, Singer, TV Host, ("The Ultimatitan-sabay sabay Star") (Taytay)
- Alex Gonzaga (born 1988) – TV Host, Vlogger, Actress, Comedian, Book Author (Taytay)
- Xyriel Manabat (born 2004) – former child and current teen actress (Taytay)
- Meg Imperial (born 1993) – Model, Actress (Taytay)
- Andrea Brillantes (born 2003) – former child and current teen actress, dancer (Taytay)
- Jon Lucas (born 1995) – Teen Actor, Dancer, Rapper (former member of Hashtags of It's Showtime!) (Taytay)
- Rez Cortez (born 1956) – Filipino Veteran actor and assistant director (Taytay)
- Cai Cortez (born 1988) – actress and comedian (Taytay)
- Faith Anne (born 1994) – singer

=== Journalism ===
- Sandra Aguinaldo (born 1975) 24 Oras I-Witness Filipina television news anchor journalist, writer and documentarian (Angono)
- Rhea Santos (born 1979) – Unang Hirit host (San Mateo)

=== Music ===
- Valentin Mechilina (born 1915) – conductor and composer known for his Dalampasigan overture (Binangonan)
- Gloc-9 (born 1977) – rap artist and musician (Binangonan)

=== Politics ===
- Consuelo Ynares-Santiago (born 1939) – former associate justice of the Supreme Court of the Philippines (Binangonan)
- Mon Ilagan (born 1960) – broadcaster, former mayor of Cainta who served in 2004 - 2013 (Cainta)
- Rebecca Ynares (born 1949) – Former Politician, served as the Governor of Rizal Province in 2001 – 2004, and 2013 – 2022 (Taytay)

=== Sports ===
- Christian Standhardinger (born 1989) – Basketball Player (Angono)
- Arvin Tolentino (born 1995) – Basketball Player (Angono)
- Carleans Rivas (born 1988) - Professional Boxer, 2024 WIBA World Light Flyweight Champion (Angono)
- Johnmar Villaluna (born 1994) – MLBB Pro Player, 2021 SEA Games Gold Medalist, MLBB World Champion (Antipolo)
- Alvin Patrimonio (born 1966) – retired professional Filipino basketball player (Cainta)
- Tin Patrimonio (born 1991) – athlete (tennis) player, model, actress and a former reality show contestant (Cainta)
- Rachel Daquis (born 1987) – Volleyball Athlete (Taytay)
- Oliver Barbosa (born 1986) – Chess Grand Master (Taytay)
- Daniel Quizon (born 2004) - Chess Grand Master (Taytay)
- Rosendo Balinas Jr. (1941-1998) - Chess Grand Master (Antipolo)
