= Rizal Provincial Capitol (1962) =

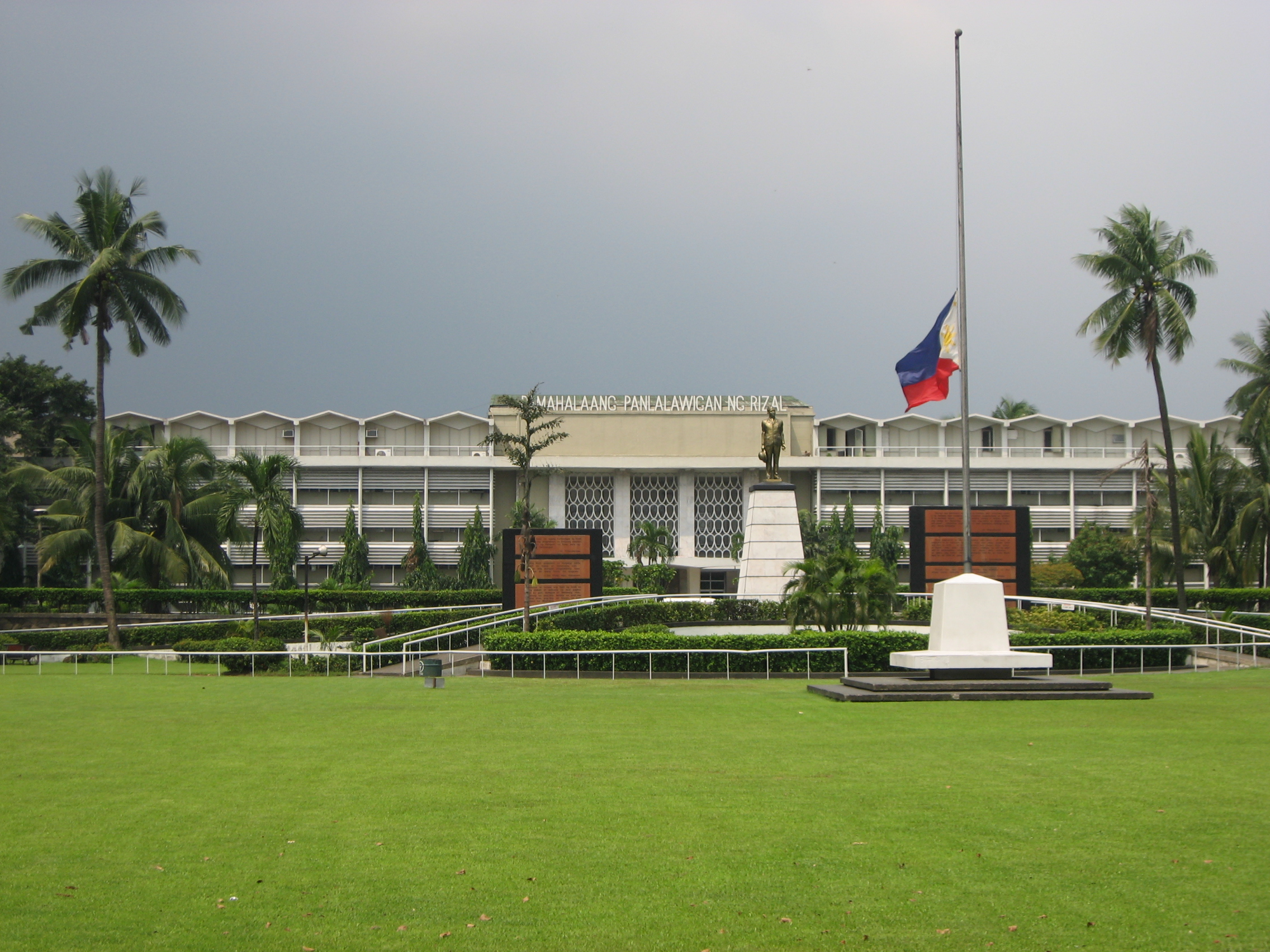
- The capitol in 2007
- Alternative names: Kapitolyo

General information
- Location: Pasig, Metro Manila, Philippines
- Coordinates: 14°34′31″N 121°03′47″E
- Year built: 1962
- Closed: 2009
- Demolished: c. 2009–2011
- Cost: ₱784,000

Design and construction
- Architect: Ruperto Gaite

The Rizal Provincial Capitol in Barangay Oranbo in Pasig, Metro Manila, Philippines was the seat of government of the province of Rizal from 1962 until 2009. Pasig had served as the province's capital until 2020, a designation it retained even after becoming part of Metro Manila in 1975.

== History ==
=== Construction ===
The Rizal Provincial Capitol in Barangay Oranbo, Pasig, was Rizal province's second provincial capitol, succeeding the one built in the 1900s, which was located along the Pasig River in what is now Barangay Santa Rosa, Pasig. It was built in 1962 under Rizal Governor Isidro Rodriguez at the cost of ₱784,000 (equivalent to ₱87,973,620 in 2021). The lot was donated by the Ortigas family to the Rizal provincial government.

=== Incorporation of Pasig to Metro Manila ===
In 1975, Pasig became part of Metro Manila. However, the city remained the seat of the Rizal provincial government despite the capitol building now geographically outside the province. Nevertheless, residents of Rizal still had to visit Pasig for government transactions.

This remains the case until 2009, when a new provincial capitol was opened in Antipolo, This made Antipolo as the new de facto capital of Rizal until 2020 when it was legally formalized.

=== Aftermath ===
As per the original deed of donation to Rizal, the property reverted to Ortigas & Co. after the capitol was vacated. The site was redeveloped into the Capitol Commons mixed-use development starting in 2011.

In 2020, the seat of government of Rizal was officially moved from Pasig to Antipolo.

== Architecture and design ==
Ruperto Gaite was the architect of the capitol which had Modernist influences. Gaite inherited the original plan for the building as exhibited by its classical symmetry.
