= Capitol Commons =

Mixed-use development in Pasig, Philippines

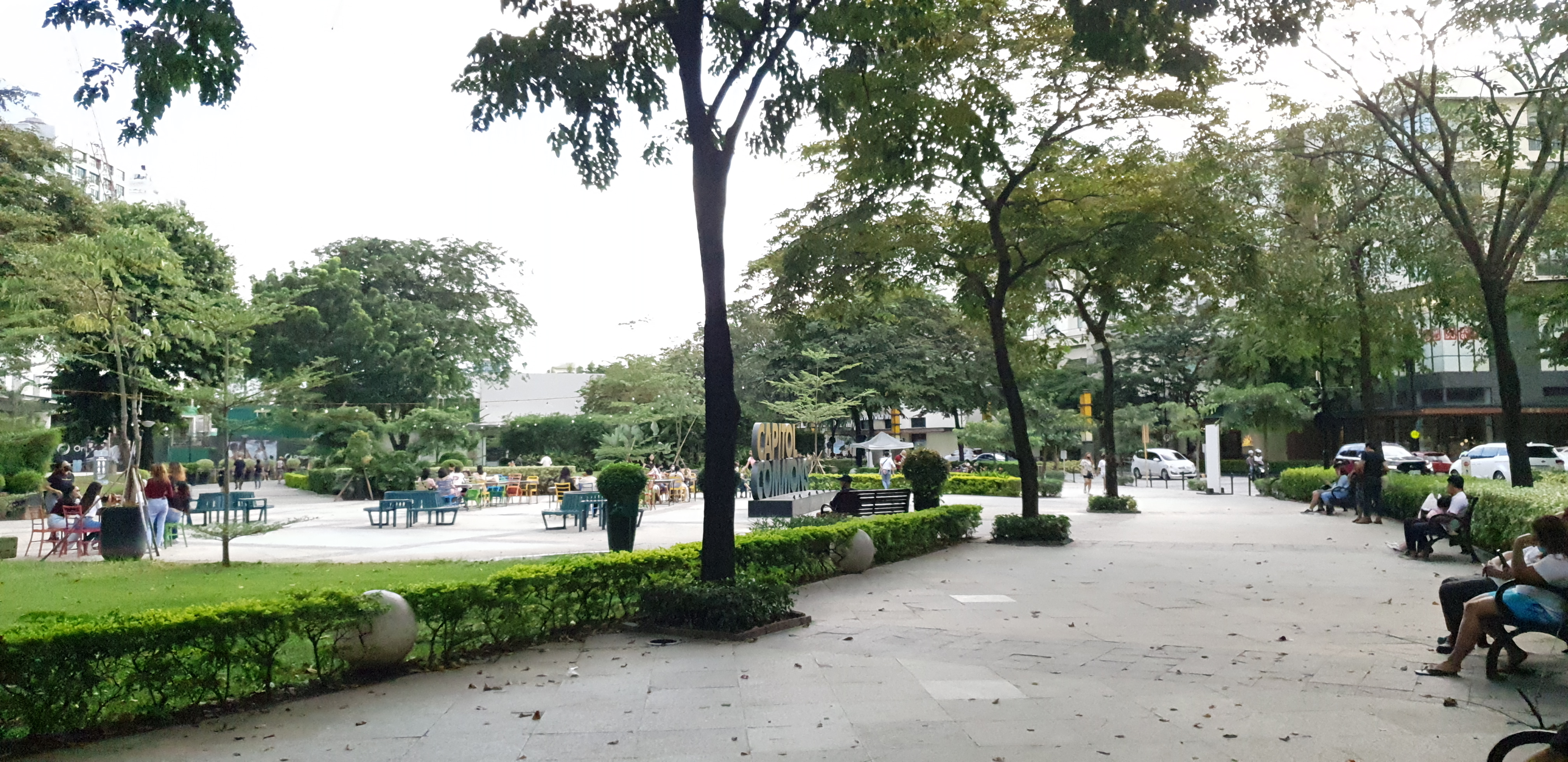
- A foot pathway skirting the Capitol Commons Park, a centerpiece urban park in the Capitol Commons

Project
- Opening date: 2011; 15 years ago
- Developer: Ortigas & Company
- Owner: Ortigas & Company
- Website: Capitol Commons

Physical features
- Transport: Shaw Boulevard; MMS Shaw Boulevard (future)

Location
- Interactive map of Capitol Commons
- Coordinates: 14°34′33″N 121°03′49″E
- Country: Philippines
- Region: Metro Manila
- City: Pasig
- Barangay: Oranbo
- Address: Meralco Avenue, cor. Shaw Boulevard, Ortigas Center, Brgy. Oranbo, Pasig City 1600 Metro Manila, Philippines

Capitol Commons is a mixed-use development in barangay Oranbo, Pasig, Metro Manila, Philippines, adjacent to the Ortigas Center financial district. It is a redevelopment of the former Rizal Provincial Capitol complex. The 10-hectare (25-acre) site being developed by Ortigas & Company Limited Partnership, the same developer behind Ortigas Center, features Pasig's first high-end shopping center called Estancia at Capitol Commons. Once completed, the ₱25-billion mixed-use commercial, residential and office development will have 35,000 square meters (380,000 sq ft) of retail space, 20,000 square metres (220,000 sq ft) of office space for knowledge process outsourcing (KPO) companies, and 280,000 square meters (3,000,000 sq ft) of residential units. The development is also home to the Capitol Commons Park, which takes up fifty percent of the development.

== Location ==
Capitol Commons is situated in the southern portion of barangay Oranbo in the western part of Pasig, just north of barangay Kapitolyo (named after the former Rizal provincial capitol). It is an eastern extension of Ortigas Center bounded by Meralco Avenue on the west, Shaw Boulevard on the south, Camino Verde Road to the east, and Capt. Henry Javier Street to the north. It is located close to major Pasig landmarks such as the PhilSports Complex, the Department of Education main offices, Valle Verde Country Club, and the University of Asia and the Pacific. The development is served by Shaw Boulevard MRT station which lies approximately 1 kilometer (0.62 mi) to the west.

== History ==
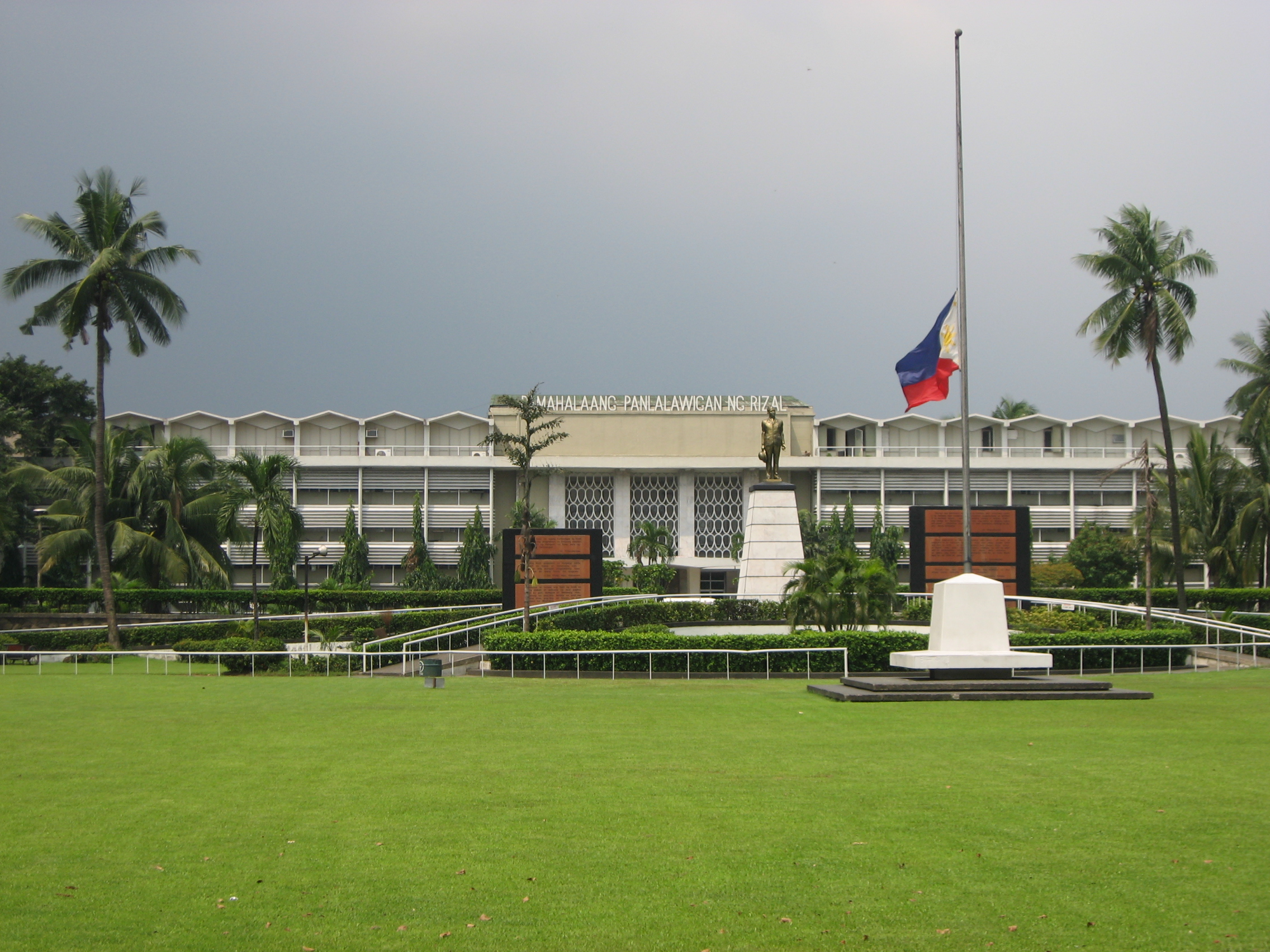
The second Rizal Provincial Capitol in 2007. It served as the official seat of Rizal from 1962 to 2009 and was demolished in 2010.

The Capitol Commons site formed part of the Hacienda de Mandaloyon which Ortigas & Co. founder Don Francisco Ortigas y Barcinas purchased from the Augustinian religious order during the early days of the American colonial period. The estate spanned 4,033 hectares (9,970 acres) covering parts of Pasig, Mandaluyong, Quezon City and San Juan in what was then the province of Rizal. Over the years, Ortigas & Co. developed and sold off most of the former estate as subdivisions or villages such as Valle Verde, Greenhills, Wack-Wack and Greenmeadows. In 1950, the provincial capitol was moved from its former location on the Mariquina River in barangay Santa Rosa, Pasig to this new site donated by Ortigas & Co. The second Rizal capitol stood on this site for close to 60 years even after Pasig was separated from the province and annexed to Metropolitan Manila since November 7, 1975. In 2008, the Rizal provincial government finally moved its capital to Antipolo with its new capitol located near the Ynares Center. Ownership of the old capitol site was then returned to the Ortigas company for redevelopment as a commercial center in 2011.

== Estancia Mall and office complex ==
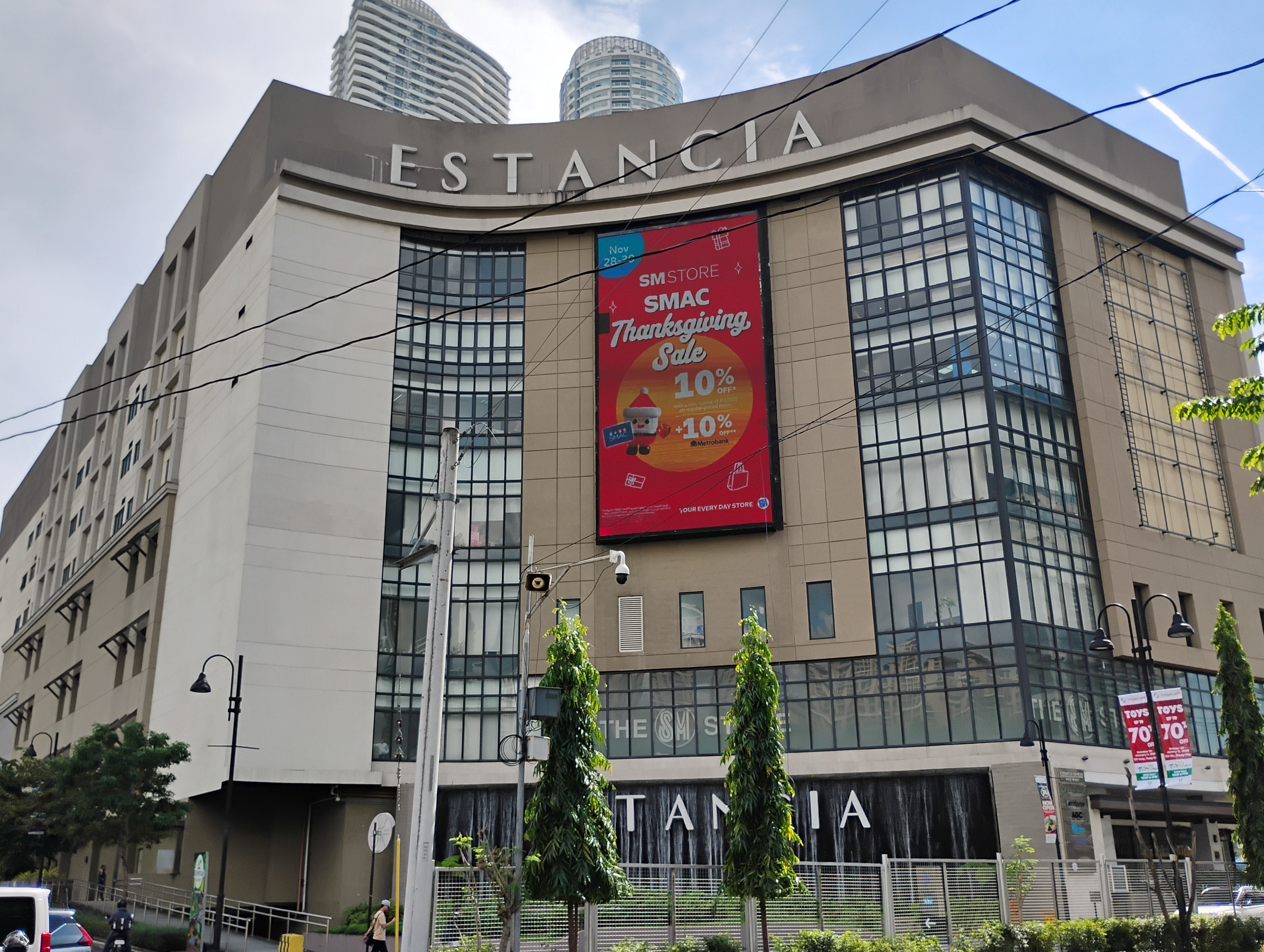
Estancia at Capitol Commons

Estancia is the upscale retail anchor for the Capitol Commons development. It has 30,000 square meters (320,000 sq ft) of leasable space in three levels and is anchored by international furniture retailers West Elm and Pottery Barn. The lifestyle center also carries other international brands such as Aéropostale, Old Navy, Cortefiel, Debenhams, Kurt Geiger, Diesel and Isaac Mizrahi. It is also home to several restaurant chains such as Coco Ichiban and TWG Tea. A major component of the Estancia mixed-use complex is the North and South Wings, which house 19,461 square meters (209,480 sq ft) of business process outsourcing (BPO) office space accredited by the Philippine Economic Zone Authority (PEZA). The mall was completed in 2014.

=== Estancia Mall expansion ===
Ortigas & Company have allotted ₱26 billion in key developments within the Capitol Commons property. This includes a large expansion to Estancia Mall, initially called The Paragon and Entertainment Hub in previous marketing materials, called the East Wing. Estancia Mall's expanded section has a gross floor area of 76,000 square meters (820,000 sq ft). It houses a branch of The SM Store, six cinemas, the Divine Mercy Chapel (a Roma Catholic chapel), more lifestyle shops, and office spaces at the top floors. Those office spaces are located at the Estancia Offices, which consist of three towers: North Wing, South Wing, and West Wing.

The mall's new section opened on November 29, 2019. It hosts the first-ever Ortigas Cinemas with four digital cinemas and two luxurious Screening Room Cinemas. It is also co-managed by SM Cinema.

== Other projects ==
Estancia at Capitol Commons with the Imperium and Royalton towers in the background

=== Residential condominiums ===
- The Imperium
- The Royalton
- Maven
- Empress
- Maxen (to be built)

=== Retail ===
- Unimart Supermarket
- Gastro
- Paragon Mall

=== Leisure ===
- Capitol Commons Park
