= Ching (surname) =

- Language: Chinese (Mandarin, Cantonese, Southern Min); English

Ching is a Chinese and English surname.

== Origins ==
As a Chinese surname, Ching may be a romanisation of the pronunciations in different varieties of Chinese of the following surnames, listed based on their Pinyin romanisation (which reflects the Mandarin Chinese pronunciation):

- Jing (various characters and tones), spelled Ching in the Wade–Giles romanization of Mandarin Chinese, which was common up to the 20th century and remains widespread in Taiwan:
  - Jīng (荊)
  - Jīng (traditional Chinese: 經; simplified Chinese: 经)
  - Jǐng (井)
  - Jǐng (景)
  - Jìng (敬)
- Qing (various characters and tones), spelled Ch'ing in Wade–Giles:
  - Qīng (卿)
  - Qíng (Chinese: 黥)
  - Qìng (traditional Chinese: 慶; simplified Chinese: 庆)
- Chéng (程), spelled Ching based on its Cantonese pronunciation
- Zhuāng (simplified Chinese: 庄; traditional Chinese: 莊), spelled Ching based on its pronunciation in various Southern Min dialects

Ching is also a Cornish surname, from the Cornish dialect form of the surname Chinn, which originated as a nickname for people with distinctive chins.

== Statistics ==
In Ontario, Canada, Ching was among the 200-most-common peculiarly Chinese surnames in a 2010 survey of the Registered Persons Database of Canadian health card recipients in the province.

According to statistics compiled by Patrick Hanks on the basis of the 2011 United Kingdom census and the Census of Ireland 2011, 493 people on the island of Great Britain and two on the island of Ireland bore the surname Ching as of 2011. In the 1881 United Kingdom census there had been 476 people with the surname Dann, primarily at Cornwall and neighbouring Devon.

The 2010 United States census found 7,417 people with the surname Ching, making it the 4,772nd-most-common name in the country. against 6,919 people (4,683rd-most-common) in the 2000 Census. In both censuses, about seven-tenths of the bearers of the surname identified as non-Hispanic Asian or Pacific Islander, about nine percent as non-Hispanic white, and between four and six percent as Hispanic of any ethnicity. It was the 211th-most-common surname among Asian and Pacific Islanders.

== People ==
=== Academia ===
- Emily S. C. Ching (程淑姿; fl. 1999–present), Hong Kong theoretical physicist
- Frank Ching (born 1943), American architecture and design graphics writer and academic
- Julia Ching (秦家懿; 1934–2001), Chinese-born professor of religion, philosophy and East Asian studies in Canada
- Pao-yu Ching (金寶瑜; born 1937), Chinese-born American Marxist–Leninist–Maoist economist
- Ren-Chang Ching (秦仁昌; 1898–1986), Chinese botanist
- Te May Ching (nee Tsou; 1923–2020), Chinese-born agronomist in the United States
- Wai-Yim Ching (born 1945), Chinese-born physicist in the United States

=== Entertainment ===
- Carla Ching (fl. 2001–2007), American playwright, television writer, and teacher
- Joyce Ching (born 1995), Filipino actress and model
- Larry Ching (1921–2003), American nightclub singer
- Ching Li (井莉; 1945–2017), Hong Kong actress
- Ching Miao (井淼; 1913–1989), Hong Kong actor
- Ross Ching (born c. 1985), American filmmaker
- Ching Siu-tung (程小東; born 1953), Hong Kong action choreographer, actor, film director and producer
- William Ching (1913–1989), American actor

Surname of stage name:

- Ching Lau Lauro (fl. 1827–1839), stage name of a juggler and magician, possibly an Italian bandsman named Lauro Cecconi (1807–1892)
- Ching Ling Foo (金陵福), stage name of the Chinese magician Chee Ling Qua (朱連魁; 1854–1922)

=== Government and politics ===
- Charles Ching (沈澄; Sam2 Cing4; 1935–2000), Hong Kong barrister and judge
- Ching Cheung-ying (程張迎; born 1958), Hong Kong politician and schoolteacher
- Cyrus S. Ching (1876–1967), Canadian-American industrialist, federal civil servant and labor union mediator
- UK Ching (1937–2014), Bangladeshi freedom fighter
- Tautoloitua Sauasetoa Ho Ching, American Samoan politician

=== Sport ===
- Brian Ching (born 1978), American soccer executive and retired player
- Danny Ching (fl. 2010–2014), American standup paddleboarder
- Ching Hong Aik (郑宏育; born 1973), Malaysian former footballer
- Ian Ching (1928–2006), New Zealand cricketer
- Laura Lee Ching (born 1951), American surfer
- Ching Siu Nga (程小雅; born 1987), Hong Kong racewalking athlete

=== Other ===
- Jeffrey Ching (born 1965), Filipino classical composer
- Mariano Ching (fl. 1996–2007), Filipino artist
- Michael Ching (born 1958), American composer
- Patrick Ching (born c. 1963), American conservationist, wildlife artist, ornithological illustrator and author of children's books
- Raymond Ching (born 1939), New Zealand painter

== See also ==
- Ching (given name)
- Ching Hai (清海; born 1950), Vietnamese religious leader (Ching Hai is a dharma name meaning "clear sea")
- Ma Mya Ching (fl. 1991–1996), Bangladeshi politician
