= Raises Academy =

Private school in Rizal, Philippines

Raises Academy (Angono, Rizal) Inc.
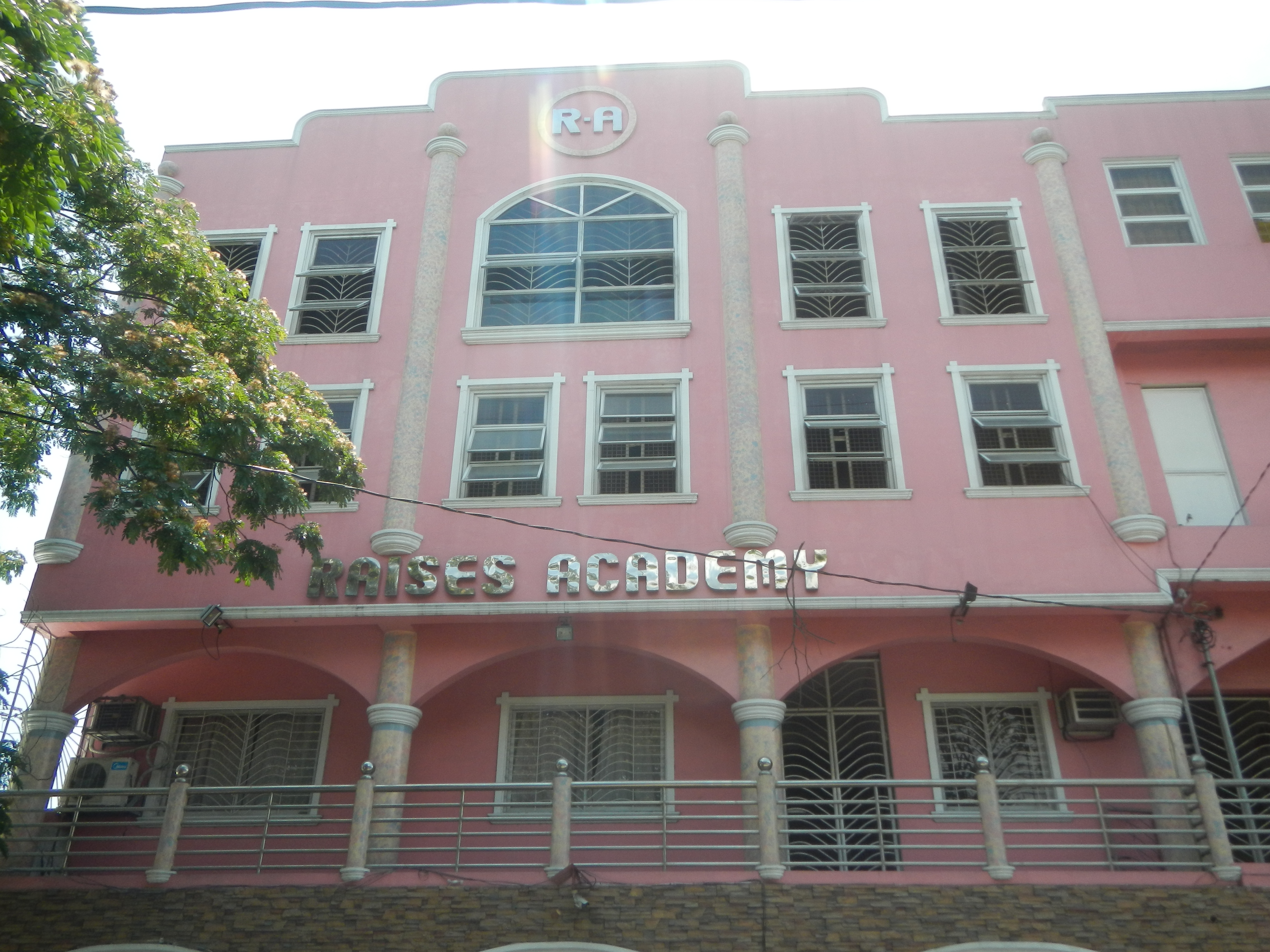

Location
- Angono, Rizal; Philippines
- Coordinates: 14°31′44″N 121°09′15″E

Information
- Former name: Raises Academy
- Type: Private, Nonsectarian
- Motto: It takes a family to raise a child.
- Established: June 6, 1997; 28 years ago
- Director: Johanna Pascual Gatdula
- Campus: Brgy. San Pedro, Angono (Preschool and Elementary Education); Brgy. Kalayaan, Angono (High School)
- Colors: Pink and white
- Sports: Rizal Private Schools Association (RIPRISA); Angono Public and Private School Athletic Association (APPSSA)
- Mascot: Raises Wolf-Spider, Raiseans
- Nickname: Raises Wolf-Spider
- Affiliations: RIPRISA, APPSAA, Mendiola Consortium
- Hymn: Raises Ang Aking Pamilya
- Website: www.raisesacademy.org

Raises Academy (Angono, Rizal) Inc. , popularly known as Raises Academy, is a private, non-sectarian school in Angono, Rizal, Philippines. It is located at Brgy. San Pedro, for Preschool and Elementary, and Brgy. Kalayaan for High School. It was founded on February 21, 1997. From its initial nature as a tutorial center, it was transformed to a formal school providing accommodation to twenty-eight members of the faculty and catering to comparatively seven hundred fifty students. The new annex building was built to accommodate its growing family.

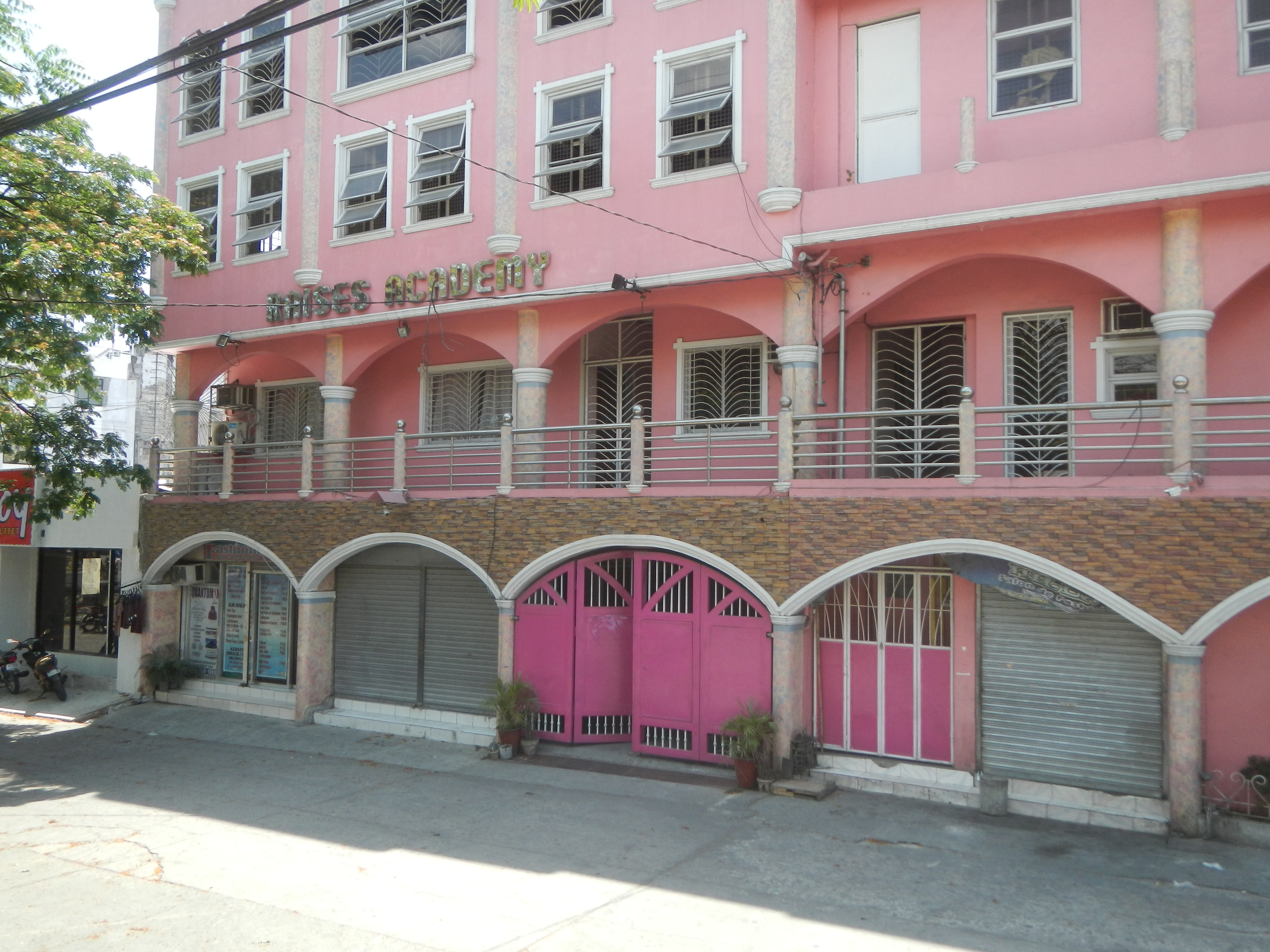
