= Angono–Binangonan Petroglyphs =

Prehistoric petroglyph in the Philippines

- Mga Petroglipo ng Angono–Binangonan
- Petroglyphs of the Rock-shelter; Angono Petroglyphs
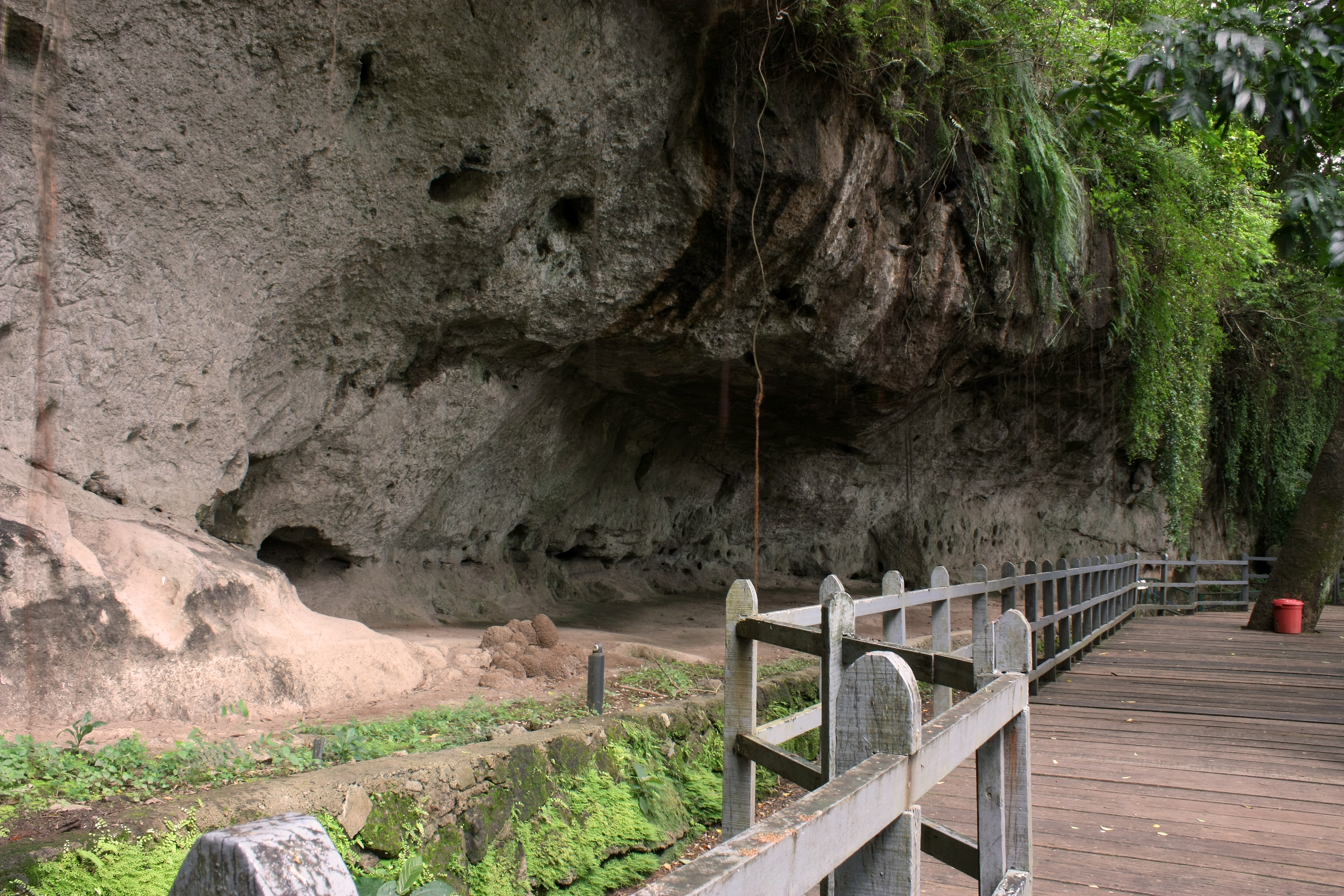

- Location of Angono–Binangonan Petroglyphs in the Philippines
- 14.532872°N 121.18679°E
- Type: Cave
- Periods: Neolithic period
- Location: Bilibiran, Binangonan, Rizal, Philippines
- Region: Calabarzon

Site notes
- Management: National Museum of the Philippines

The Angono–Binangonan Petroglyphs are petroglyphs carved into a rock wall between the boundaries of Angono and Binangonan in the province of Rizal, Philippines. They consist of 127 human and animal figures engraved on the rock wall, probably during the Late Neolithic or before 2000 BC. They are the oldest known work of art in the Philippines. The inscriptions depict stylized human figures, frogs, lizards, and other designs that may have represented additional figures, although erosion has made some of them indistinguishable. The engravings are mostly symbolic representations and are associated with healing and sympathetic magic.

The site was declared a National Cultural Treasure by the National Museum of the Philippines in 1973. It is also the site of the Angono–Binangonan Petroglyphs Site Museum, also known as the National Museum of the Philippines – Rizal. The site was included in the World Inventory of Rock Art in 1985 and in the World Monuments Watch and World Monuments Fund's list of historic sites. It is also included in the Philippines' tentative list of UNESCO World Heritage Sites.

== History ==
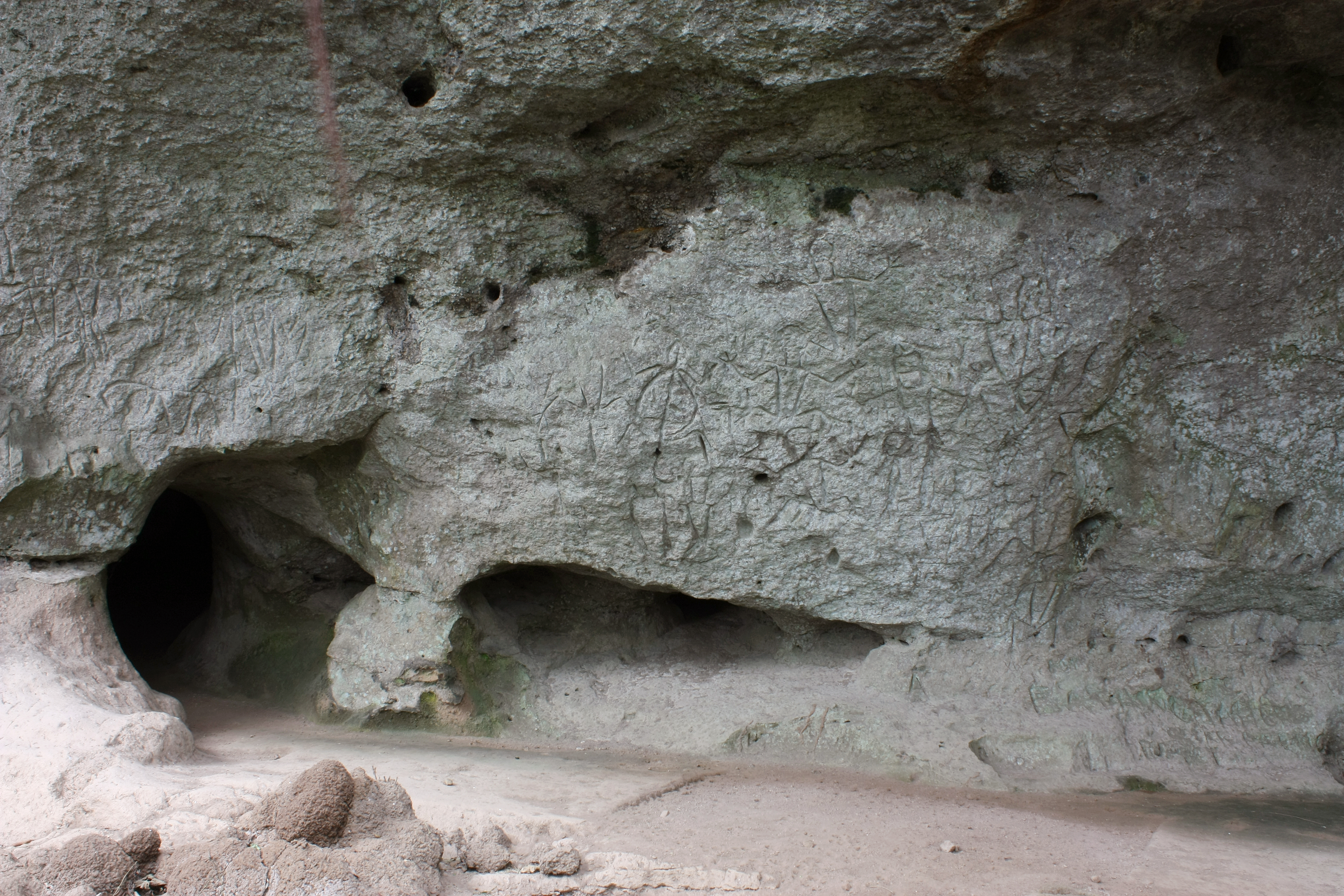
Angono Petroglyphs, considered oldest form of art in the Philippines dated during the Late Neolithic period.

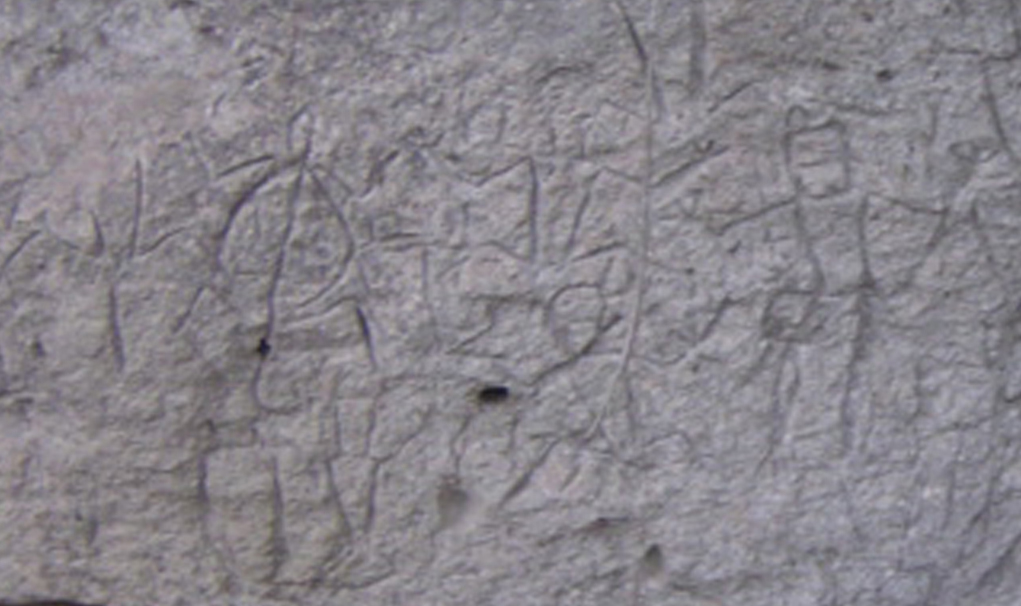
A closeup of the rock carvings of the Angono Binangonan Petroglyphs.

The existence of a rock shelter was reported to the National Museum by the late National Artist of the Philippines Carlos V. Francisco in March 1965 during a field trip with several boy scouts along the boundaries of Angono, Binangonan and Antipolo of the province of Rizal. Since then, some rock carvings have been damaged due to neglect and vandalism. In 1973, by virtue of Presidential Decree No. 260, it was declared as a national cultural treasure by the Philippine government. During that time, a team led by the National Museum of the Philippines started archaeological site conservation and site development of the petroglyphs in which a mini-museum, view deck and stone path, among others, were constructed. It was included in the list of National Cultural Treasures in 1973 and World Inventory of Rock Art in 1985.

In 1996, The World Monuments Fund included Angono Petroglyphs on its list of preservation projects and has helped with the installation of a drainage system and assigned a caretaker to protect the site. The site is also on the tentative list of UNESCO World Heritage Sites of the Philippines.

== Description ==
The Angono Petroglyphs is located in a shallow rock shelter. It measures 63 meters wide, 8 meters deep and a maximum height of 5 meters. It has been created due to faulting and formed in volcanic soil during the Quaternary period. There are 127 drawings in the form of animate and static figures of circular or dome-like head on top of a V-shaped torso distributed on a horizontal plane on the rock wall area measuring 25 meters by 3 meters. Only 51 of the total 127 drawings are distinct. Due to the complexity and plurality of the drawings, it is suggested that the drawings on the rock were not only created by a single individual. It is widely believed that the figures drawn on the walls are for healing purposes as the site is a dambana. Researchers have argued that the figures were medicinal and religious in function as they were made by ancestors to transfer the sickness of a child onto the limestone wall, thus, curing the child from ailments.

== Archaeological excavations ==
From October to November 1965, archaeological excavations, headed by Alfredo Evangelista, was done on the area of the rock shelter. Fragmented bits of earthenware, two pieces of obsidian flakes, two chert, flake stone tools, one stone core tool and polished stone adze with a blunted working edge were excavated in the rock shelter. The artifacts suggest that the site was used during the Neolithic age, or earlier than 2000 BC.

In 2018, Jalandoni & Taçon proposed that the petroglyphs consist of two different phases created by different cultures. The older Phase 1 is composed of around 51 geometric shapes; including 11 disembodied vulva forms that are depicted as bisected triangles or ovals, small holes (cupules), and at least one human figure with bent elbows and knees. Phase 1 is believed to be created by Australo-Melanesian (Negrito) hunter-gatherers using stone tools.

Phase 2, on the other hand, modified Phase 1 petroglyphs by adding limbs, heads, and torsos to previous stick human figures. Some depicted as having horn-like or rectangular-shaped headdresses, while three were holding curved objects. Four of the human forms had a bowling pin shape, three had oval bodies, and one had a "fishtail" for legs. Phase 2 is much more recent, with much sharper edges and lines, and may have been carved by Austronesian hunter-gatherers.

Modern graffiti also contaminate the site, and there is a possibility that Phase 2 may also possibly be modern and carved by Philippine guerilla forces hiding in the caves during World War II.

== Management ==
The preservation and development of the Angono Petroglyphs is a collective effort of the National Museum of the Philippines, the Department of Tourism, World Monuments Fund, American Express and a Philippine real estate company.

It was first opened to the public in 1989, with a green-painted iron fence and a low concrete wall separating the rock wall from viewers. The previous landowner, Antipolo Properties Inc. donated the land directly in front of the shelter to the National Museum, and they also maintain access roads, cleared vegetation, and bore a tunnel through the ridge for easier access by tourists.

A viewing deck was installed by the National Museum in 1997. The site was closed for 14 months until October 2015 for renovations and the installation of a newer viewing deck. Graffiti by visitors is a problem. And though the site provides "visitor books" for guests to draw upon, these are rarely used as they are safeguarded by the National Museum staff. The tunnel leading to the area is not monitored and is also the site for graffiti by visitors, though these may have a positive impact as it channels away graffiti from the main site.

The site of the Angono Petroglyphs is developed as the Angono Branch of the National Museum showcasing the cultural and artistic heritage of the province of Rizal. Its collections include remains of giant turtle, tusks, fossils, molar of Elephas sp., tradeware ceramics and paintings.
