= Angono National High School =

Public high school in Rizal, Philippines

Coordinates: 14°31′39″N 121°08′48″E

Location
- Angono, Rizal; Philippines

Information
- Established: 1980

Angono National High School is a public high school in Angono, Rizal, Philippines established in 1980 and has gained a reputation as the most prestigious and the top high school in the Philippines, as of 2022.

In 2018, the school was recognized by the Department of Education for its performance in the National Achievement Test in Mathematics, Science, and English. In 2019, on the other hand, the school was recognized by the Department of Education as a recipient of the "Gawad Siklab" award for its performance in the implementation of the K-12 program. Forbes Magazine in 2020 recognized the school for its performance, citing its "incredible performance" and affirming its reputation as a premier institution of learning in Rizal.
