= List of Cultural Properties of the Philippines in Angono, Rizal =

This list contains an overview Cultural Properties of the Philippines in Angono, Rizal.

Cultural Property wmph identifier (Note: wmph is an internal identifier used by Wikimedia Philippines to identify the monument. This is not an official identifier, and only shown temporarily in the templates until the government creates an updated complete list.)	Site name	Description	Province	City or municipality	Address	Coordinates	Image
	Angono Fire Station		Rizal	Angono, Rizal			Upload file
	Angono Police Station		Rizal	Angono, Rizal			Upload file
	RIC - Children Center Central	The first Daycare Center in Angono.	Rizal	Angono, Rizal			Upload file
	Bahay Pamahalaan	Present Seat of the Government of Angono. Built in 1957.	Rizal	Angono, Rizal			Upload file
	Vincentian Hills Seminary	Built in 1963.	Rizal	Angono, Rizal			Upload file
	Loyola Retreat House	Built in 1964.	Rizal	Angono, Rizal			Upload file
	Rural Bank of Angono, Inc.	The first bank established in Angono. Built in 1965.	Rizal	Angono, Rizal			Upload file
	Carabao Head Statue	Created by Nemesio Miranda	Rizal	Angono, Rizal			Upload file
	Kim Joe Lumber	The first lumber warehouse in Angono	Rizal	Angono, Rizal			Upload file
	Rizal Centennial Monument	Erected in 1961.	Rizal	Angono, Rizal			Upload file
	Querico Feliciano Saratan House	Built in 1960s. Has the first sari-sari store in Angono.	Rizal	Angono, Rizal			Upload file
	Tiamson House	Built in 1950s	Rizal	Angono, Rizal	344 Dona Aurora Street		Upload file
	Unknown Ancestral House	Probably built in 1950s or 1960s	Rizal	Angono, Rizal	346 Dona Aurora Street		Upload file
	Unknown Ancestral House	Probably built in 1960s	Rizal	Angono, Rizal	348 Dona Aurora Street		Upload file
	Dona Nena House		Rizal	Angono, Rizal	348 Dona Aurora Street		Upload file
