= Mariano Ching =

Chinese-Filipino artist

- Education: University of the Philippines Diliman (1993–1998), Kyoto University (2002–2004)
- Known for: Painting, illustration, and photography
- Notable work: May Alaga Akong Puno (1998), Bakit Matagal ang Sundo Ko (2001)
- Spouse: Yasmin Sison-Ching
- Awards: 1998 Alcala Illustrators' Prize, 2001 Alcala Illustrators' Prize, CCP Thirteen Artist Award

Mariano Ching is a Chinese–Filipino artist, painter, illustrator, and photographer. His works have been exhibited in Philippines, France, Singapore, Malaysia and United States.

== Biography ==
Mariano's first experience with art was at four years old, when a cousin taught him how to draw simple shapes. He and his brother, Jonathan Ching, who would also grow up to become an artist, spent most of their time inside drawing instead of playing outside. Mariano was greatly influenced by the anime Mazinger Z and Voltes V which were widely popular during his youth. They would significantly affect his future works. In his high school years, his parents reminded him to think carefully about his future career. They said there was no money in art and that he should consider a career in medicine or engineering instead and make art as a hobby.

Despite his parents' constant reminder, Mariano eventually pursued the road towards becoming an artist. While he was an engineering student at the University of the Philippines, Mariano also enrolled in a lot of art workshops to hone his skills. One of these workshops proved to be a turning point. He was on his fourth year in engineering when he attended an art workshop headed by Elemer Borogan and Gina Morales. The art style of the paintings so touched him that he decided to shift to painting as his major. During his years in University of the Philippines College of Fine Arts, he co-founded the art group Surrounded by Water. There, he met his future wife, Yasmin Sison, who was also a member of Surrounded by Water. At that time Mariano was still relatively new at the art scene and had not yet garnered recognition.

In 1998, Mariano won his first major award. His illustration work for the book entitled Mayroon Akong Alagang Puno won the Alcala Illustrators' Prize, the grand prize awarded by the Philippine Board on Books For Young People (PBBY), a nonprofit and non-governmental organization committed to the development of children's literature in the Philippines. The award included a cash prize of P25,000.00, a gold medal, and an opportunity for the book to be published.

In 2001, he won the award again with the book entitled Bakit Matagal ang Sundo Ko?. [right side table style with following input lower part] Cover Illustration for Bakit Matagal ang Sundo Ko?" 2001. {insert} photo}

In 2002, he won the Monbusho Scholarship. The Monbusho scholarship is given to foreigners under the Japanese government to study in Japan. He became a grant awardee as a research student in Kyoto University. He majored in printmaking, specializing in Japanese woodblock printmaking.

In 2006, Mariano Ching received the Thirteen Artist Award given by the Cultural Center of the Philippines (CCP).

== Surrounded By Water ==
The art group Surrounded by Water was founded by Wire Tuazon. The group was named "Surrounded by Water" after the first gallery that was held in Angono, Rizal. Its concept is based on Neo-Angono. The group moved the Surrounded by Water gallery to Mandaluyong. They established a concept that is based on emerging and experimental art in and around Manila. They exhibited art that is not regularly shown in galleries and there were few galleries that took in emerging young artists.

=== Members ===
1. Wire Tuazon
2. Keiye Tuazon
3. Mariano Ching
4. Yasmin Sison
5. Jonathan Ching
5. Geraldine Javier
7. Lena Cobangbang
8. Jason Oliveria
9. Louie Cordero
10. Eduardo Enriquez
11. Amiel Roldan
12. Mike Munoz
13. Cristina Dy

== List of major and minor exhibitions ==
=== Individual exhibitions ===
Date	Name	Group	Place
1999	Banana Float	Surrounded by Water	Angono, Rizal
1999	Bed Time Stories	Surrounded by Water	Pasig
2000	Rubber Soul	British Council	Pasig
2000	Standing Still	Surrounded by Water	Pasig
2001	Landscape	Surrounded by Water	Pasig
2001	Between the Stars and the Sea	Voice Gallery	Kyoto, Japan
2006	Tao Gama (Gama Men)	West Gallery	Quezon City
2006	Between the Stars and the Sea	Magnet Gallery	Makati City

=== Group exhibitions ===
Date	Name	Group	Place
1996	Paintings by Numbers		Cultural Center of the Philippines, Manila
1996	Brain School for Babies	U.P. Faculty Center Galleries	Diliman, Quezon City
1996	Delatang Pinoy: Yes, the Filipino Can!	Hiraya Gallery	U.N. Avenue, Manila
1996	Picture Show	Dominador Castaneda Hall	U.P Diliman, Quezon City
1996	New Territory	U.P. Faculty Center Galleries	U.P. Diliman, Quezon City
1996	Mula Filibustero Hanggang Kay Marimar	Jorge Vargas Museum	U.P Diliman, Quezon City
1996	Japan	Asia Print Art Exhibition	Fukuoka, Japan
1996	Alicia on My Mind	Hiraya Gallery	U.N. Avenue, Manila
1997	Four Expressions: City Boy's Lust for Life	Hiraya Gallery	U.N. Avenue, Manila
1998	Bakat		Cultural Center of the Philippines, Manila
1998	Inaugural Exhibition	Surrounded by Water	Angono, Rizal
1998	Reprint		Australia Center, Australian Embassy, Makati City
1998	X-Prints	Jorge Vargas Museum	U.P. Diliman, Quezon City
1998	No Preservatives	Surrounded by Water	Angono, Rizal
1998	Songs of Renewal	Casa San Miguel	San Antonio, Zambales
1998	Dog Show	Surrounded by Water	Angono, Rizal
1998	Crossroads (terminal baggage)		Australia Center, Australian Embassy, Makati City
1999	Vision 21	Jorge Vargas Museum	U.P. Diliman, Quezon City
1999	Coordinates	Boston Gallery	Quezon City
1999	Daily Planet	Surrounded by Water	Ortigas
1999	Dog Show	Surrounded by Water	Ortigas and Angono, Rizal
1999	Today's Show	Surrounded by Water	Cultural Center of the Philippines, Manila
1999	Cracks and Abyss		Art Center, Mandaluyong
1999	Topology of Signs		Cultural Center of the Philippines, Manila
2000	Into the Rabbit Hole	Surrounded by Water	Ortigas
2000	Conspiracy Theory	Surrounded by Water	Ortigas
2000	Grand Royale	Big Sky Mind	Quezon City
2000	Dog show	Surrounded by Water	Ortigas
2000	True Confession		Art Center, Mandaluyong
	Fifth Mondial Triennal of Small Size Prints		France
2000	Valentine Willie Fine Art		Kuala Lumpur
2000	Faith and the City	Earl Lu Gallery; ABN AMRO House; Valentine Willie Fine Art	Lasalle SIA College of Arts, Singapore; Malaysia; Kuala Lumpur
2001	Surrounded		Cultural Center of the Philippines, Manila
2001	Cool Pieties		Art Center, Mandaluyong
2001	If the Devil is 6, Then God is 7		Rockwell Center, Makati City
2002	Feast of Conversation	Atelier Frank and Lee	Singapore
2003	Stay with Art	Hotel T Point	Osaka, Japan
2005	On Paper	Magnet Gallery	ABS, Quezon City
2005	SBW exhibit	Saguijo Gallery	
2005	Fragile Youth with Artificial Legs	Saguijo Gallery	
2005	Innocent When You Dream	Finale Gallery	Mandaluyong
2006	Post Modernism is so Last Season	Green Papaya Art Project	
2006	The Way We Get By	West Gallery	Quezon City
2006	13 Artists Award Exhibit		Cultural Center of the Philippines, Manila
2007	Scab on My Brain	Space 1026	Philadelphia, USA
