= Yasmin Sison-Ching =

Filipina Artist & painter

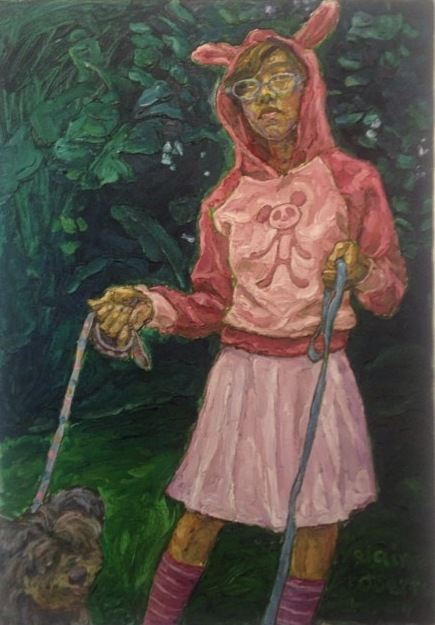
- Portrait of Yasmin by Elaine Navas
- Born: February 21, 1972 (age 54); Brgy. Iba, Silang, Cavite, Philippines
- Education: University of the Philippines Diliman (1988-2001)
- Known for: Painting, Drawing, Sculpture, Installation
- Notable work: Eating Rainbows (2012), The Still Room (2012)
- Movement: Abstract Expressionism / Contemporary Arts
- Spouse: Mariano Ching
- Awards: 2006 Cultural Center of the Philippines Thirteen Artists Awardee, 2007 Ateneo Art Awardee, Shortlisted

Yasmin Sison-Ching is a female Filipino artist and painter.

== Life ==
Biography

The artist was born in 1972 in Cavite. In 1988, she began her art education in the University of Philippines, Diliman. She held a degree in Humanities and Fine Arts and graduated as a cum laude. In 1992–1993, She studied for the Philippines Certificate for Professional Education in UP Diliman. In 1994–1997, She took Philippines Bachelor of Fine Arts, Major in Painting. In 2001, Yasmin also took the Philippines MA Art Education in UP Diliman. In 2008, her artwork Bear, from the Into the Woods exhibition, was fetched the highest price at the Borobudur auction in Singapore. Yasmin is married to a fellow visual artist, Mariano Ching and she has a son named, Haraya Ching. Her works are inspired by mass media, other artists, and everyday life.

In her early years of art directions, Yasmin Sison-Ching began experimenting with abstract expressionism. The artist then moved toward representational imagery and has since made a mark with her unflinching portraits of children, capturing their emotional states as well as their physical and psychological transitions. In 1992, the artist assisted Emong Borlongan at the Cultural Center of the Philippines when he was teaching drawing at the summer workshop. Yasmin worked as a primary teacher at the Cavite Institute, Silang, Cavite in 1993–1994. She continued her professional experience as a lecturer in the Department of Arts and Letters in St. Benedict College, Alabang, Muntinlupa. She then taught grade school English and art full-time for a year and pursued Fine Arts after that. She taught Humanities and Fine Arts at St. Scholastica's College, Malate, Manila in 1998–2001. Then, Yasmin became an instructor at the Ayala Museum in 1999–2006. The artist was one of the members of the Surrounded by Water Gallery in Mandaluyong, and returned at the Cavite Institute to continue her grade school teaching career in 2002–2006. Her first solo exhibition was in 1995 at the West Gallery, Megamall.

== Awards ==
| Year | Awards |
|---|---|
| 2006 | Cultural Center of the Philippines Thirteen Artists Awardee |
| 2007 | Ateneo Art Awardee, Shortlisted |

== Exhibitions ==
| Year | Exhibits |
|---|---|
| 2003 | Silent Declarations (Kuala Lumpur, Malaysia); Dogshow, UFO, Mandaluyong, Cubicle, Pasig; Portalet, Linya Gallery (Tibanga, Iligan, Philippines) |
| 2005 | Reading For Beginners, UFO Gallery (Mandaluyong, Philippines); Innocent When You Dream, Finale Gallery, Megamall; Fragile Youth with Artificial Legs, Theo Gallery, Saguijo (Makati, Philippines); SBW exhibit at Saguijo, Theo Gallery, Saguijo (Makati, Philippines); On Paper, Magnet, ABSCBN Building |
| 2006 | Unmade, MAG:Net Paseo De Roxas (Makati, Philippines); Dog Show, Green Papaya Arts Project, Diliman (Quezon City, Philippines); 13 Artist Award Show, CCP Complex; Balancing Act, Future Prospects, Marikina Shoe Expo; The Way We Get By, West Gallery, West Avenue; Post Modernism is So Last Season, Green Papaya Art Projects |
| 2007 | The Punky Brewster Session (Katipunan, Quezon City, Philippines); I Have Nothing To Paint and I'm Painting It (Taguig, Philippines); Gingerbread Girls, Finale Art File, SM Megamall (Mandaluyong, Manila, Philippines) |
| 2008 | The Weight of Waiting (Kuala Lumpur, Malaysia); Turning Tides (Makati, Philippines); Spinning Sugar, Mag:net Gallery (Katipunan Avenue, Quezon City, Philippines); In Between Days, Blanc (Makati, Philippines) |
| 2009 | Into the Woods (Mandaluyong, Philippines); Saturday Fun Machine a Group Show (Makati, Philippines); DimeBag 3, Shoe Box Diorama, Mag:net Gallery, The Columns, Makati and West Gallery, West Avenue (Quezon City, Philippines), In the Ocean Without a Boat or a Paddle, Blanc Gallery (Shaw Boulevard); Post Tsunami Art, Marella Gallery (Milan, Italy); Prague Biennale 4, Karlin Hall (Prague); Things Said Amongst Us, Nadi Gallery, Jakarta, Indonesia |
| 2010 | Spaces in Between (Artesan Gallery + Studio, Singapore); Scribble Stage (Makati, Philippines); Games for Growing, Blanc Gallery, Peninsula Hotel (Makati, Philippines); Latitudes, Marella Gallery (Milan, Italy) |
| 2011 | Underneath the Sky (Makati, Philippines); Munnyfestation (Quezon City, Philippines); Scribble Stage, Finale Gallery (Makati, Philippines); Painters as Photographers, Silver Lens Gallery; To Be Continued, Osage (Hong Kong); Collidoscope, VWFA (Singapore); Line and Space, MAG:NET Gallery (Quezon City, Philippines); Love Letters, Manila Contemporary (Makati, Philippines) |
| 2012 | Surrounded by Water, Over the Water (Singapore); Painting the Sublime (Makati, Philippines); The Domestic Life of Pictures (Makati, Philippines); Chimera, Singapore Art Museum (Singapore); Build, Blanc Peninsula (Makati, Philippines); A&L: The Parallel Lives Museum, U.P. Vargas Museum; Readymade China Girls, MO Space (Taguig, Philippines) |
| 2013 | Playing House (Makati, Philippines); Stacking Up (Taguig, Philippines); Picture Imperfect, Mo_Space (Bonifacio Global City, Taguig, Philippines); Beast/Bloom for Thee: Biota Etc., Canna Gallery (Jakarta, Indonesia); Mona Lisa, CCP (Pasay, Philippines); Monogashi, Silverlens, (Singapore); Haven't We Met Before? Art Stage (Singapore) |
| 2014 | BOOKENDS, Blanc Gallery (Quezon City, Philippines); Fan Fiction, West Gallery (Quezon City, Philippines); Tabletop, Altro Mondo (Makati, Philippines); What Does it All Matter, As Long As the Wounds Fit the Arrows? CCP (Pasay, Philippines); Picture Life, Tin-Aw Gallery (Makati, Philippines); Imaging Philippine Flora, MET Museum (Pasay, Philippines); Brave New Worlds, MET Museum (Pasay, Philippines); Do You Believe in Angels?, MO_Space (Bonifacio Global City, Taguig, Philippines) |
| 2015 | You Must Change Your Life, Equator Arts Project, Gillman Barracks (Singapore); Turtles All the Way Down, Special Exhibits, Art Fair Philippines 2015 (Makati, Philippines); The Last Dog Show (Come Back When You're Famous), Finale Gallery (Makati, Philippines); Melted Cities, Blanc Gallery (Quezon City, Philippines) |

== See also ==
- Mariano Ching
- Haraya Ching

== Bibliography ==
- Sison-Ching, Y. (2009). Into the Woods. Manila: Finale Art File.
- Ong, J. P. (2008, May 26). Young Filipino artists outshine masters in International Auction. Philippine Daily Inquirer, p. 23.
- Sison-Ching, Y. (2015, April 25). Email interview.
