= Te May Ching =

Chinese seed physiologist (1923–2020)

- Born: January 9, 1923; Suzhou, China
- Died: April 21, 2020 (aged 97); Fremont, California
- Education: Central University (B.S); Michigan State University (M.S, Ph.D)
- Years active: 1956-1988
- Spouse: Kim Kwong Ching (m. 1947)
- Parent(s): Sheng Wen; Hui Ying Tsou

Te May Ching (January 9, 1923 - April 21, 2020) was a seed physiologist and worked for the OSU Crop Science Department from 1956 until her retirement in 1988.

== Life and education ==
Te May Ching was born January 9, 1923, in Suzhou, China, to her parents Sheng Wen and Hui Ying Tsou. She met her husband, Kim Kwong Ching, at the Central University in Nanjing; they married on August 10, 1947, in Shanghai, China.

She earned a B.S. in Forest Products and Wood Chemistry in 1944 from the Central University in Nanjing, China.

She moved to the United States and began a graduate program at Michigan State University, where she earned an M.S. in Wood Technology in 1950 and Ph.D. in Cytology and Genetics in 1954. She had a two-year post-doctoral fellowship in plant physiology research at MSU.

== Oregon State University ==
In 1956, Ching was hired as an Assistant Agronomist in the Oregon State College (OSC) Farm Crops Experiment Station in Corvallis, Oregon. She taught courses on seed physiology and conducted different types of research in OSC. Her work on a grain called triticale in the 1980s was part of a larger program that looked for the highest quality seeds for agriculture. In 1983, she developed a method to use an extract from fireflies to investigate differences between shriveled and plump seeds, specifically looking at enzyme variations. Ching published research papers on seed treatments, storage, and germination processes and presented her work internationally.

In 1960, she was an assistant professor in the Farm Crops Department. She was promoted to Associate Professor in 1962 and Professor in 1971.

She was part of the American Society of Agronomy, the President’s Commission on Human Rights and Responsibilities, and the Association of Women in Science. In 1985, she was made a Fellow of the American Society of Agronomy.

Ching was involved in international education and cooperation. She gave talks in China, served as an advisor for the Chinese Student Association at OSU, and was a member of the OSU International Education Committee.

== Retirement ==
Te May Ching retired from the OSU in 1988 and was made an emeritus professor.

She and her husband moved to Fremont, California, in 1998. She died from Alzheimer's disease on April 21, 2020.
