= Wai-Yim Ching =

Chinese physicist & researcher

- Education: Louisiana State University
- Awards: Received Presidential Award from University of Missouri,
- Scientific career
- Workplaces: University of Missouri-Kansas City
- Website: cas.umkc.edu/directory/ching-wai-yim

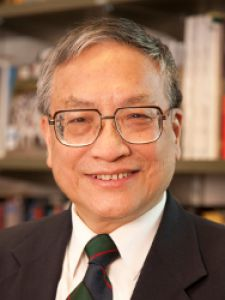

Wai-Yim Ching is a Curator's Professor of Physics at the University of Missouri, Kansas City. He is also a group leader at the Electronic Structure Group (ESG) in the Department of Physics and Astronomy and an invited speaker of the 57th Midwest Solid State Conference.

== Education ==
Wai-Yim Ching was born in 1945 in Shaoxing, Zhejiang, China. He completed his primary school and part of middle school education in China. His family moved to Hong Kong in 1966. He worked part-time in a variety of manual jobs while attending high school (Queen's College). He was admitted to the University of Hong Kong in 1966 and graduated with a B. Sc. degree in 1969 and completed his Ph.D. at the Louisiana State University.

== Research and career ==
Dr. Ching's research and publications cover diverse disciplines such as condensed matter physics, ceramics and glasses, chemistry, biology, material science, engineering, medical science, geophysics and earth science in topics:

- Advanced ceramic materials and composites
- Complex biomolecules and biomaterials
- Novel intermetallic compounds especially on high entropy alloys and Ni-based superalloys
- Structure and properties inorganic, organic and metallic glasses
- Development of next-generation new cement materials including bio-inspired cement
- Earth materials and mineralogy
- Spectroscopic studies and core-level excitations in organic and inorganic crystals.
- Microstructural modeling of defects and interfaces in ceramic materials.
- Materials for applications in energy-related science and technology

In recent years, he did research on the defects and impurities in insulators, development of computational methodologies and algorithms, Transition metal ions in laser crystals, Electronic structure of ceramics. His research area is theoretical condensed matter physics, materials science, ceramics and glasses, chemistry, biology, engineering, medical science, and earth science.

In 1978, He joined the University of Missouri-Kansas City as an assistant professor and got tenure in 1984, and quickly rose through the ranks. He was appointed Curator's Distinguished Professor of the University of Missouri in 1988. He served as the Chair of the Department from 1990-1998. He took sabbatical leaves including at the Max-Planck Institute für Metallforschung, Stuttgart, Germany in 1997 and Kyoto University, Japan in 2005.

== Awards and honors ==
In 2017, Wai-Yim Ching received the University of Missouri's Presidential Award for sustained Career Excellence. He is a fellow of the American ceramic Society, American Physical Society, American Association for the Advancement of Science and Royal Society of Chemistry in Britain. He is an associate editor of the Journal of the American Ceramic Society and also serves as an editorial board member of Scientific Reports. Additional awards include the Distinguished Scientist Award, Outstanding Referee Award, ASEE Distinguished Summer Faculty Fellow, N.T. Veatch Award for Distinguished Research and Creative Activity at UMKC, Mid-America State University Association Honor Lecturer, First Van Vleck Lecturer, and UKC trustee Fellowship. He is Elected to the Academician of the World Academy of Ceramics.

== Bibliography ==
- Electronic Structure Method for Complex Materials: The orthogonalized linear combination of atomic orbitals.
- The Magnetism of Amorphous Metals and Alloys. World Scientific Publishers.

== Publications ==
- W. Y. Ching. "Theoretical Studies of the Electronic Properties of Ceramic Materials". Journal of the American Ceramic Society.
- W. Y. Ching, and Yong‐Nian Xu. "First‐Principles Calculation of Electronic, Optical, and Structural Properties of α‐Al2O3". Journal of the American Ceramic Society.
- W. Y. Ching, Fanqi Gan, and Ming-Zhu Huang. "Band theory of linear and nonlinear susceptibilities of some binary ionic insulators". Journal of American Physical Society.
- W. Y. Ching, Shang-Di Mo, Isao Tanaka, and Masato Yoshiya. "Prediction of spinel structure and properties of single and double nitrides". Journal of American Physics Society.
- Wai‐Yim Ching, Shang‐Di Mo, Lizhi Ouyang, Paul Rulis, Isao Tanaka, and Masato Yoshiya. "Theoretical Prediction of the Structure and Properties of Cubic Spinel Nitrides". Journal of the American Ceramic Society.
