= Angono =

Municipality in Rizal, Philippines

- Municipality
- Municipality of Angono
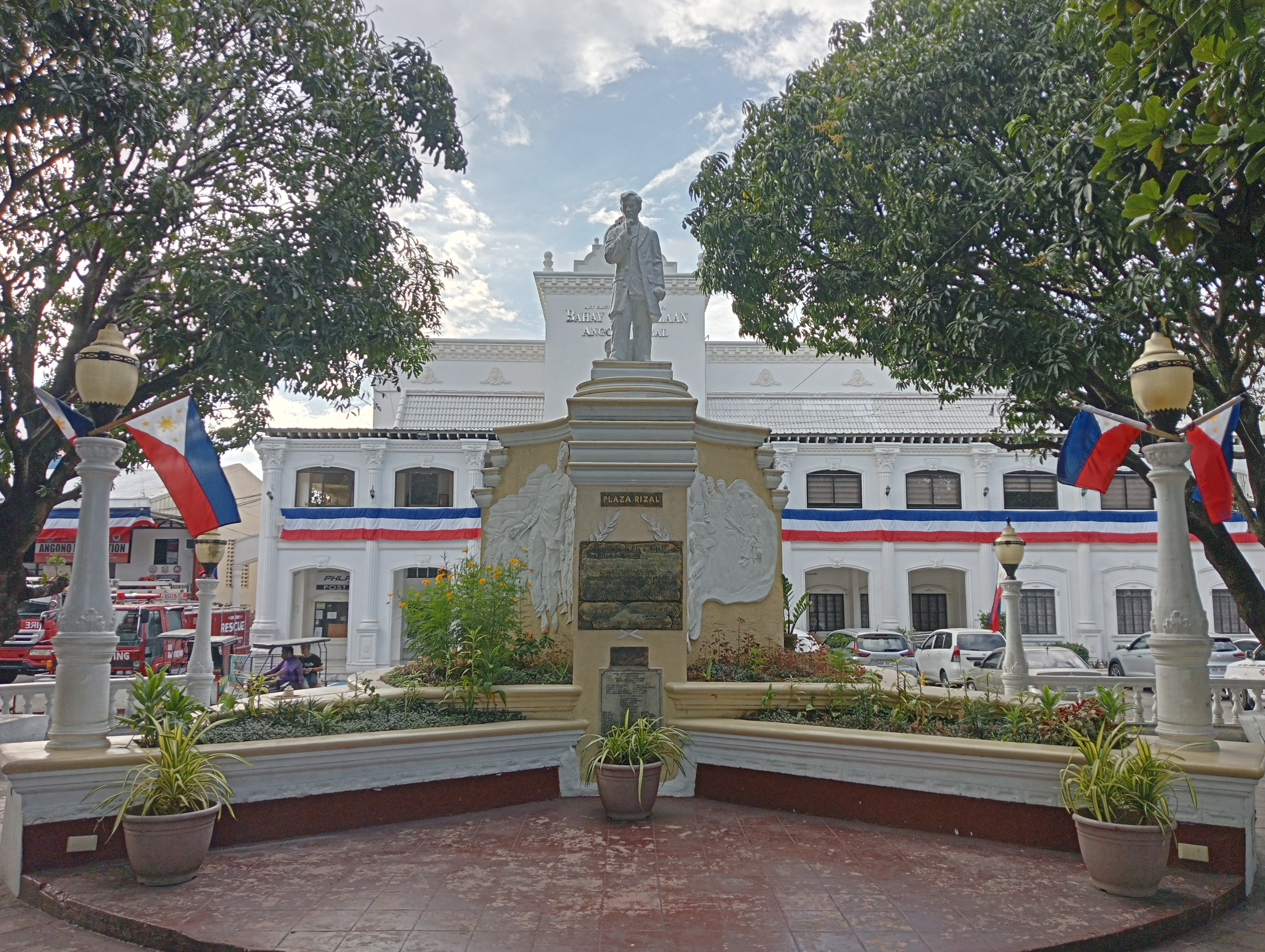
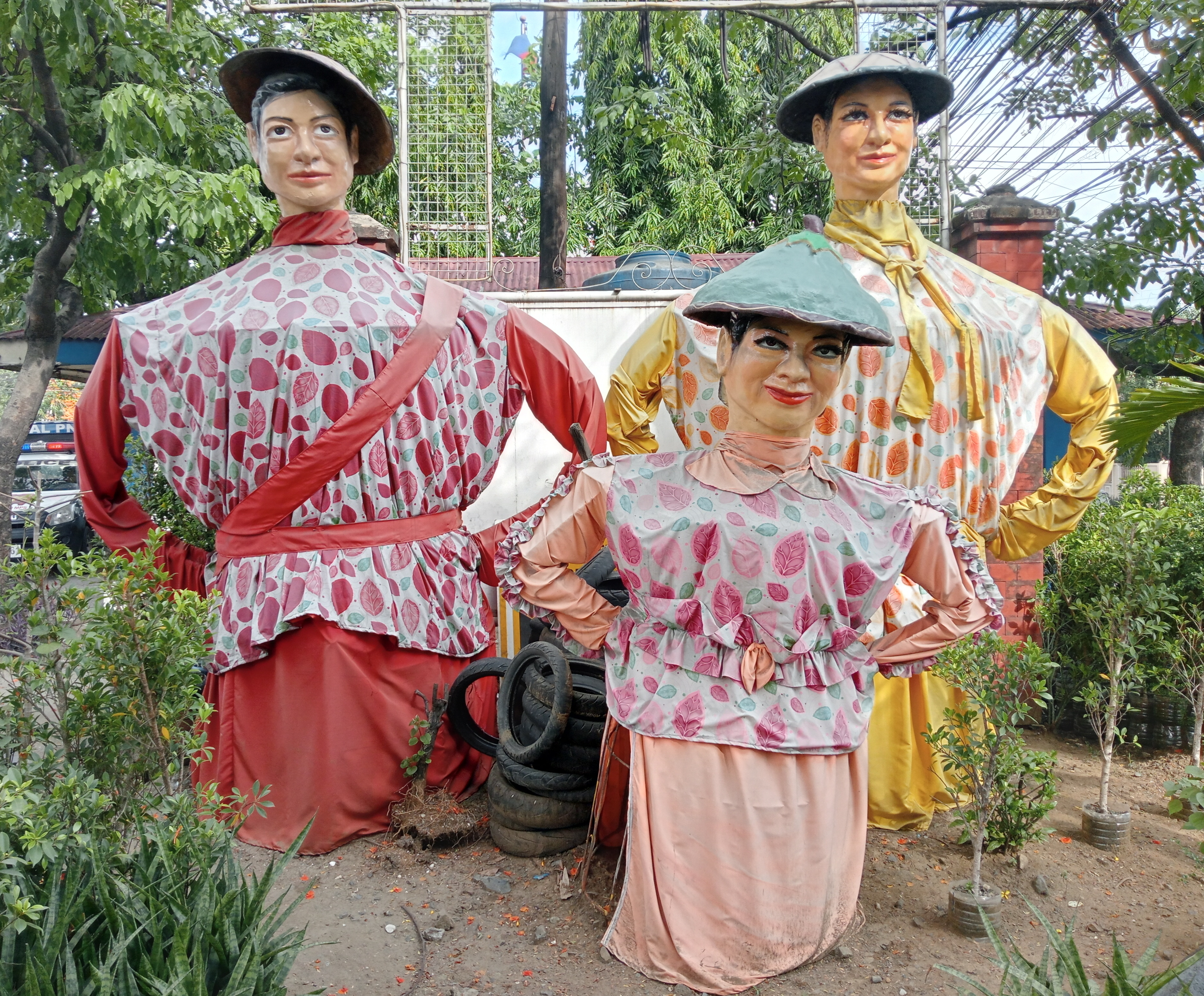
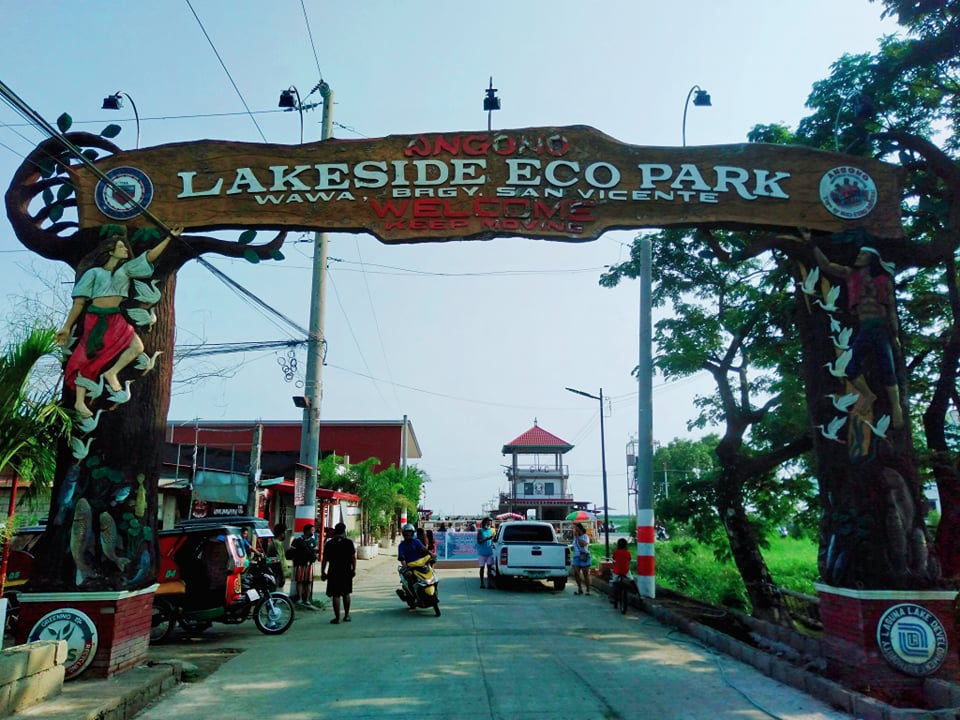
- Angono Municipal Hall & Plaza Rizal Higantes of Angono Angono Lakeside Eco Park

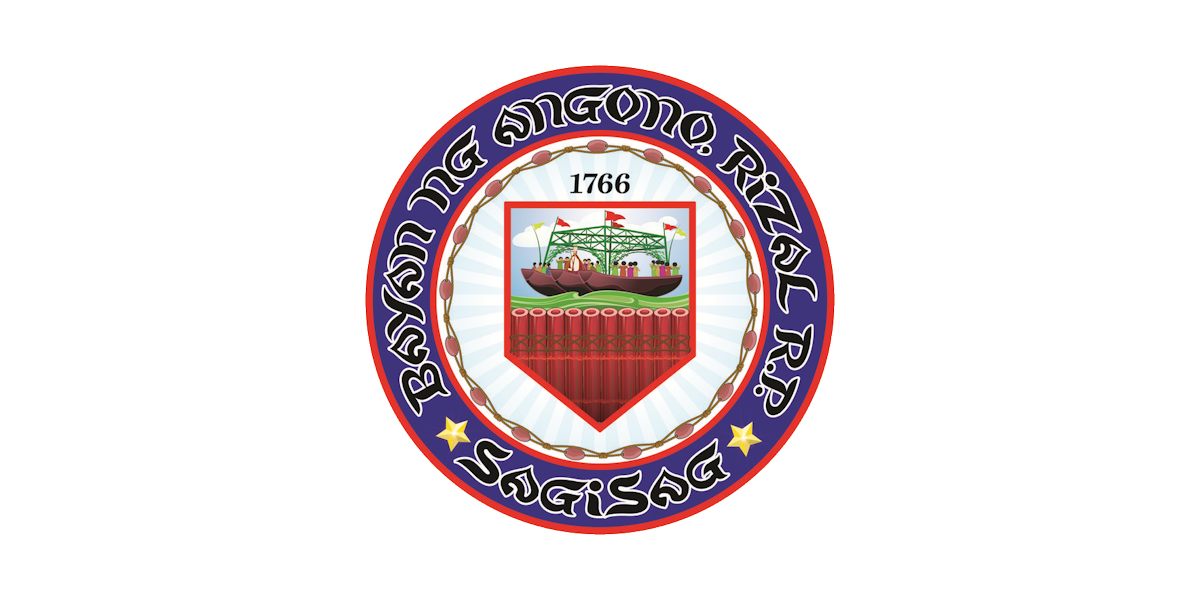
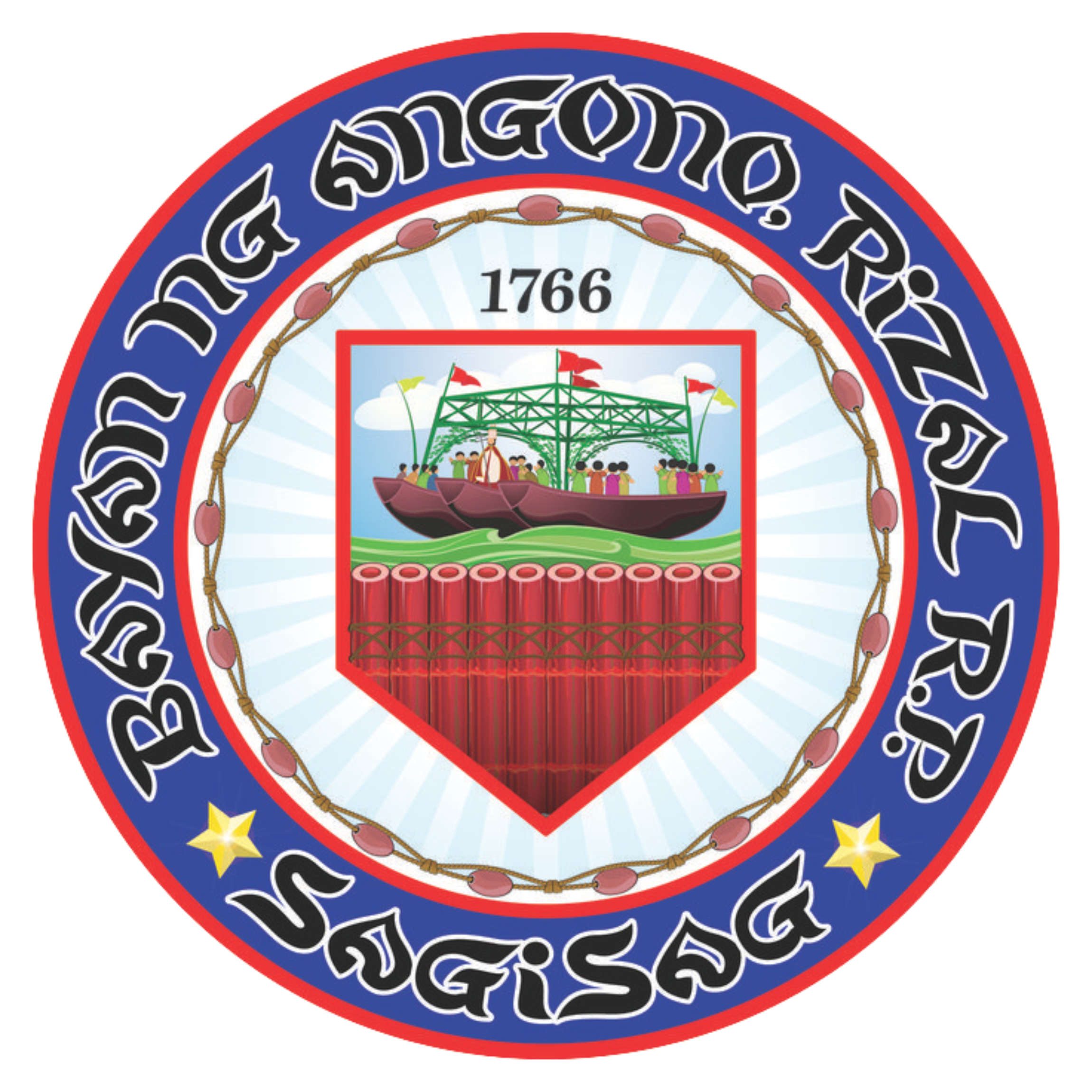
- Flag Seal
- Nicknames: Art Capital of the Philippines; Home of the Higantes Festival
- Motto: Angono: An Artist's Paradise, A Tourist's Haven
- Anthem: Hymno ng Angono
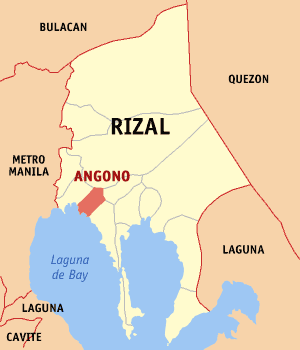
- Map of Rizal with Angono highlighted
- Interactive map of Angono
- Location within the Philippines
- Coordinates: 14°31′24″N 121°09′13″E
- Country: Philippines
- Region: Calabarzon
- Province: Rizal
- District: 1st district
- Founded: August 19, 1938
- Chartered: June 17, 1972
- Barangays: 10 (see Barangays)

Government
  - Type: Sangguniang Bayan
  - Mayor: Gerardo V. Calderon
  - Vice Mayor: Jeri Mae E. Calderon
  - Representative: Rebecca Ma. A. Ynares
  - Municipal Council: Members: Richard Bryan V. Cruz; Reynante R. Dela Cruz; Ma. Jhoana G. Duran; Jonathan V. Hernandez; Rick Lawrence Matthew C. Lagaya; Edsel G. Reyes; Jo Anne E. Saguinsin; Arvin L. Villamayor
  - Electorate: 70,071 voters (2025)

Area
  - Total: 26.22 km^{2} (10.12 sq mi)
- Elevation: 52 m (171 ft)
- Highest elevation: 272 m (892 ft)
- Lowest elevation: −1 m (−3.3 ft)

Population (2024 census)
  - Total: 134,975
  - Density: 5,148/km^{2} (13,330/sq mi)
  - Households: 30,291

Economy
  - Income class: 1st municipal income class
  - Poverty incidence: 6.08% (2023)
  - Revenue: ₱ 678.2 million (2024)
  - Assets: ₱ 1,431 million (2024)
  - Expenditure: ₱ 649.8 million (2024)
  - Liabilities: ₱ 711.4 million (2024)

Service provider
  - Electricity: Manila Electric Company (Meralco)
- Time zone: UTC+8 (PST)
- ZIP code: 1930
- PSGC: 0405801000
- IDD : area code: +63 (0)2
- Native languages: Tagalog
- Higantes Festival date: 16 November
- Saint Clement I Feast date: 22–23 November
- Catholic diocese: Diocese of Antipolo
- Patron saint: Saint Clement I
- Website: www.angono.gov.ph

Angono (pronounced [aŋˈŋono] or [aːˈŋono]), officially the Municipality of Angono (Tagalog: Bayan ng Angono), is a municipality in the province of Rizal, Philippines. According to the 2024 census, it has a population of 134,975 people.

It is best known as the Art Capital of the Philippines, being the hometown of national artist for music Lucio San Pedro and national artist for visual arts Carlos "Botong" Francisco, as well as the site of the Angono Petroglyphs, the oldest known work of art in the country.

== Etymology ==
The name "Angono" was derived from the myth of Panguno which Comes from the word "Ang nuno" which means "The Dwarf". It is also comes from the word "maanggo" the first thing people usually say meaning "ang baho" or "smelly" when tourist in Spanish Era go to Angono because the common jobs here is "pangingisda" and the locals got use to it. When you hear "doon sa mabahong pueblo" in the Spanish Era, they refer to it as the town of "Angono".

== History ==
First created as a pueblo in 1766, Angono was a barrio of its neighboring town Taytay and Binangonan before it was legally proclaimed an independent municipality in 1938 by then President Manuel L. Quezon. The 1818 Spanish census recorded the area having 319 native families and 2 Spanish-Filipino families.

The municipality was formalized by law on June 17, 1972, through Republic Act No. 6469.

=== Contemporary ===
The town is currently campaigning for its inclusion in the UNESCO Creative Cities Network as it is a center for visual arts. It is also campaigning for the inclusion of the Angono Petroglyphs (1 of 5 properties of the Petroglyphs and Petrographs of the Philippines UNESCO tentative site) in the World Heritage List.

== Geography ==
Located 12 kilometres (7.5 mi) from Antipolo and 29 kilometres (18 mi) east of Manila. With the continuous expansion of Metro Manila, the municipality is considered part of Greater Manila Area. Angono is boundaried by Taytay in the north, Antipolo in the northeast, Teresa in the east, and Binangonan in the south.

=== Barangays ===
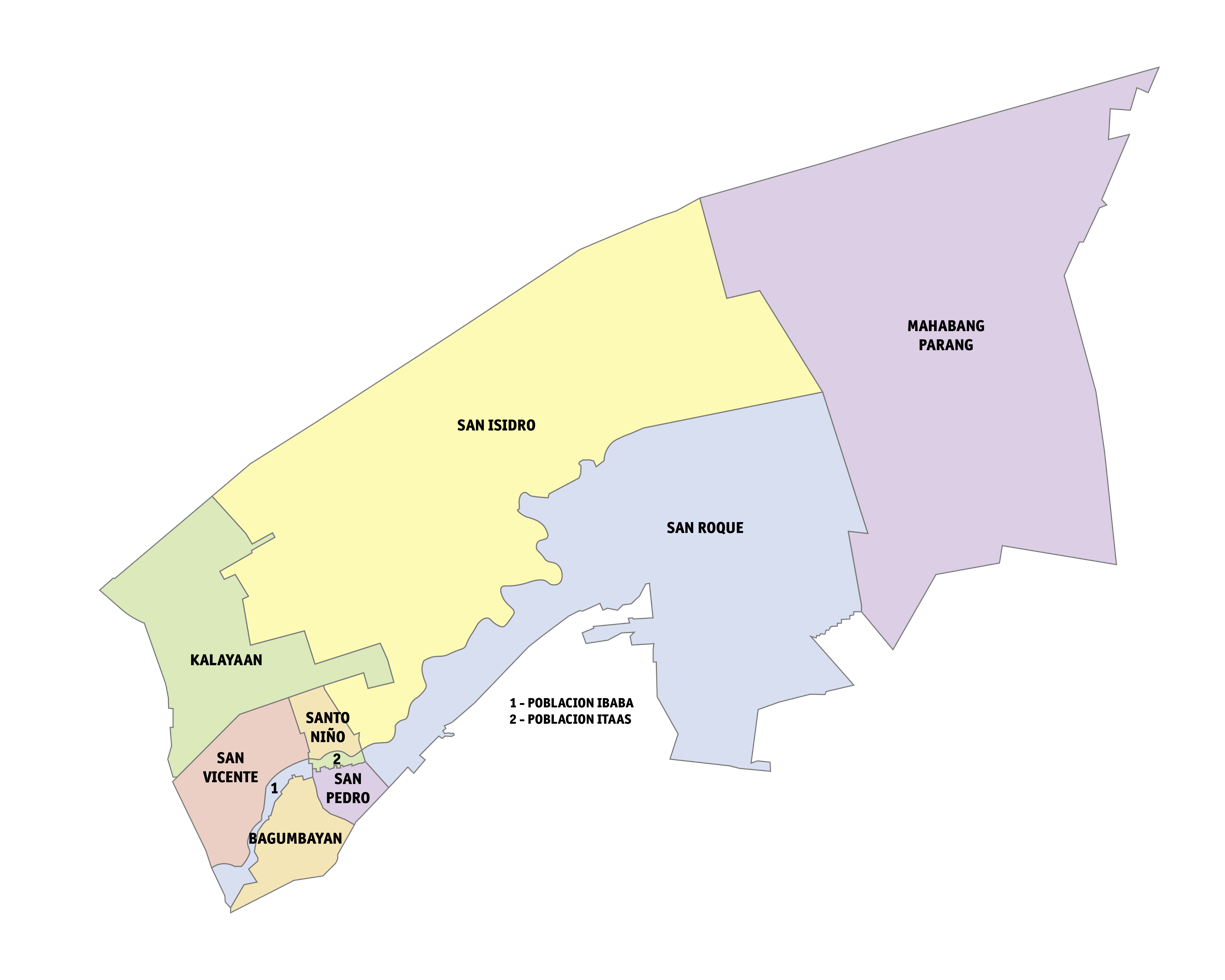
Political map of Angono

Angono is politically subdivided into 10 barangays, as indicated below and in the image herein. Each barangay consists of puroks and some have sitios.

Barangay	Population	Area
Bagumbayan	2,594	
Kalayaan	20,886	
Mahabang Parang	39,726	
Poblacion Ibaba	3,747	
Poblacion Itaas	539	
San Isidro	35,744	
Santo Niño	2,275	
San Pedro	1,875	
San Roque	13,071	
San Vicente	14,518	
Total	134,975	

==== Etymology ====
- Bagumbayan – This barangay came from the Filipino word "bagong bayan" which means "new town".
- Kalayaan – This barangay's name came from the Filipino word kalayaan, meaning "freedom".
- Mahabang Parang – The word "mahaba" means "long" and "parang" is a type of "machete", so the name of this barangay roughly translates to "long machete".
- Poblacion Ibaba – The name of this barangay came from the Spanish word "población" meaning "town" and from the Filipino word "ibaba" which means "below". Therefore, this barangay means "town below".
- Poblacion Itaas – This is the least populous barangay with a population of 583 people. The name roughly translates to "town above".
- San Isidro – The largest and most populous barangay with a population of 31,339 people. This is also one of the largest and most populous barangays in the Philippines. This barangay is named after the Catholic patron saint of farmers (and the second patron saint of Angono) named "Isidore the Farm Labourer" or "Isidore the Laborer".
- Santo Niño – This barangay's name was inspired by the image of Jesus Christ as a child garbed in royal clothing known as the "Sto. Niño"
- San Pedro – This barangay's name came from the apostle of Jesus Christ "Saint Peter".
- San Roque – The name of this barangay came from the patron saint of the sick and invalids known as "Saint Roch".
- San Vicente – This barangay's name came from the Dominican saint Saint Vincent Ferrer.

=== Climate ===
Climate data for Angono, Rizal
Month	Jan	Feb	Mar	Apr	May	Jun	Jul	Aug	Sep	Oct	Nov	Dec	Year
Mean daily maximum °C (°F)	29 (84)	30 (86)	32 (90)	34 (93)	33 (91)	31 (88)	30 (86)	29 (84)	29 (84)	30 (86)	30 (86)	29 (84)	31 (87)
Mean daily minimum °C (°F)	20 (68)	20 (68)	21 (70)	23 (73)	24 (75)	25 (77)	24 (75)	24 (75)	24 (75)	23 (73)	22 (72)	21 (70)	23 (73)
Average precipitation mm (inches)	7 (0.3)	7 (0.3)	9 (0.4)	21 (0.8)	101 (4.0)	152 (6.0)	188 (7.4)	170 (6.7)	159 (6.3)	115 (4.5)	47 (1.9)	29 (1.1)	1,005 (39.7)
Average rainy days	3.3	3.5	4.8	8.1	18.9	23.5	26.4	25.5	24.5	19.6	10.4	6.4	174.9
Source: Meteoblue (modeled/calculated data, not measured locally)

== Demographics ==
Population census of Angono

Year	Pop.	±% p.a.
1903	2,231	—
1939	3,896	+1.56%
1948	5,255	+3.38%
1960	7,093	+2.53%
1970	12,127	+5.50%
1975	17,574	+7.72%
1980	26,571	+8.62%
1990	46,014	+5.65%

Year	Pop.	±% p.a.
1995	59,444	+4.92%
2000	74,668	+5.01%
2007	97,209	+3.71%
2010	102,407	+1.91%
2015	113,283	+1.94%
2020	130,494	+3.02%
2024	134,975	+0.81%

Source: Philippine Statistics Authority

In the 2024 census, the population of Angono was 134,975 people, with a density of 5,100 inhabitants per square kilometre or 13,000 inhabitants per square mile.

=== Religion ===
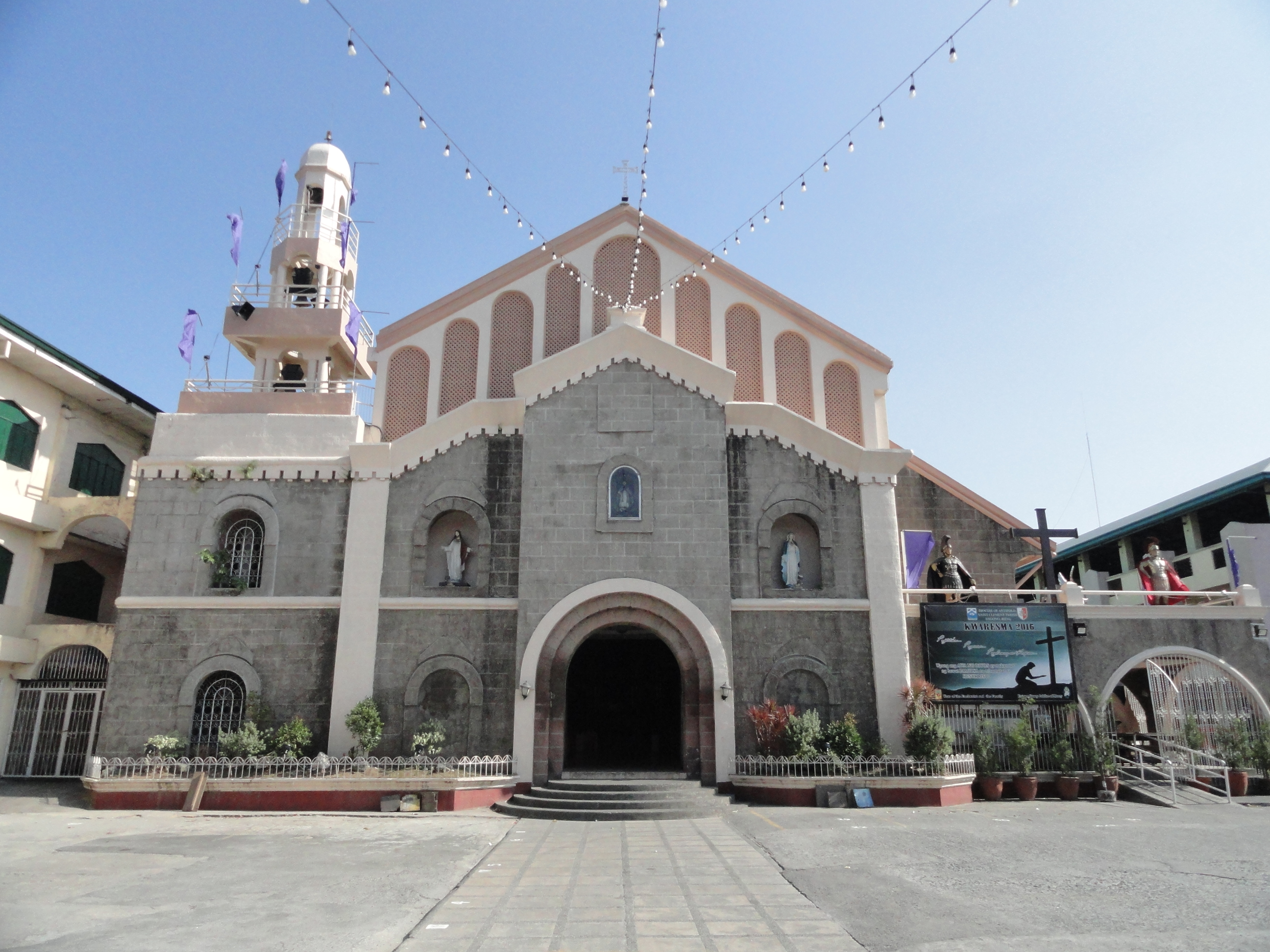
Diocesan Shrine and Parish of St. Clement

Christianity is the major religion in the town, and the majority of all Christian denomination is Catholicism and a minority of Iglesia ni Cristo, Members Church of God International Born Again, Jehovah's Witnesses and more.

Roman Catholic churches in the town includes:

- Diocesan Shrine and Parish of St. Clement, Barangay Poblacion Ibaba
- St. Joseph the Worker Parish, Barangay Mahabang Parang
- St. Joseph the Worker Parish, Yupangco
- Christ the King Chapel, Exodusville Subdivision
- San Vicente Chapel, Brgy. San Vicente.
- Sto. Niño Chapel, Constellation Homes Subdivision

== Economy ==
Poverty incidence of Angono (%)

Source: Philippine Statistics Authority

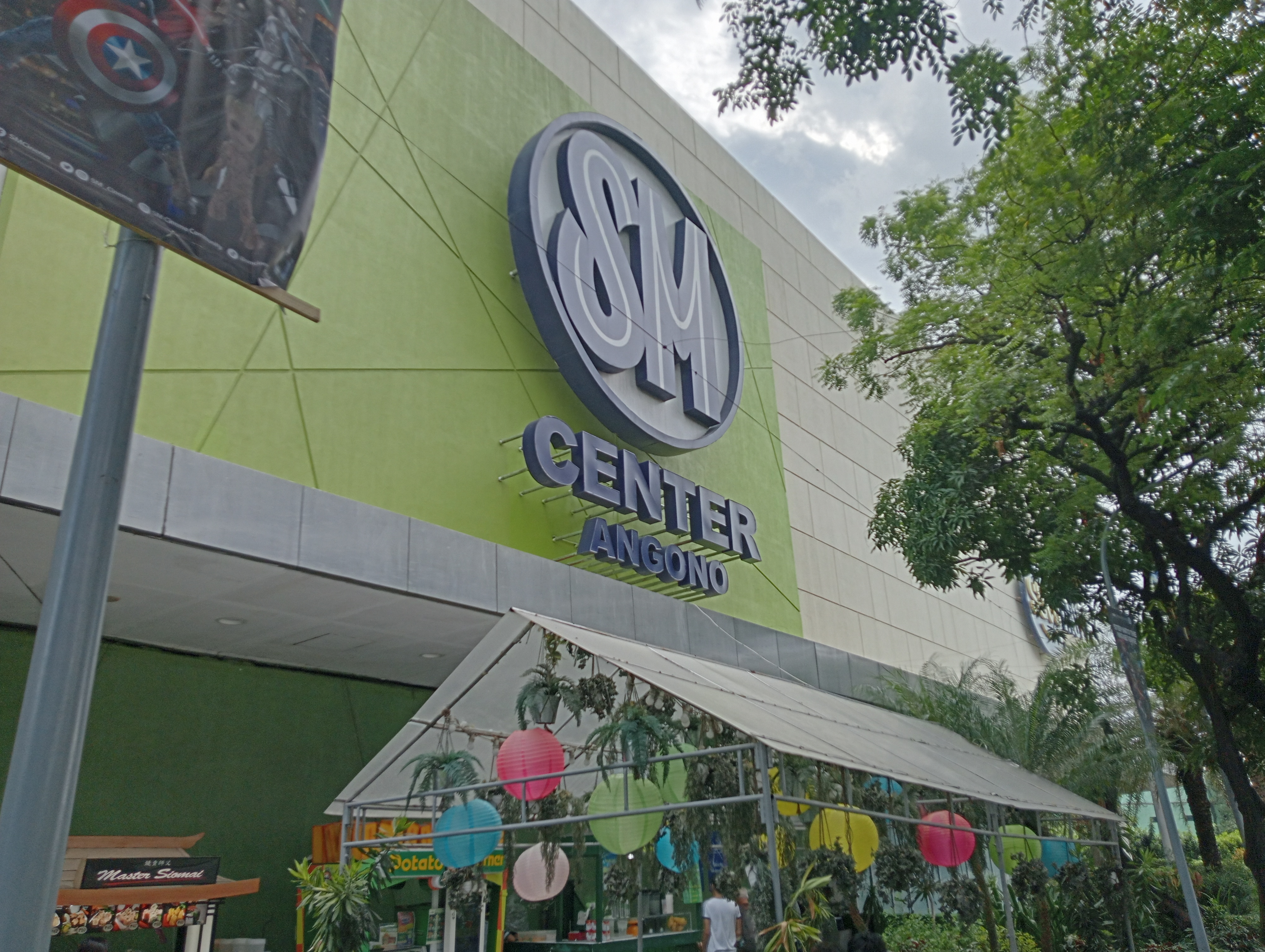
SM Center Angono

There are several business establishments present in the booming town of Angono. The SM Center Angono is considered one of the major businesses in town. Trade and commerce are active, such data processing, pawnshops and banks as well. With nearly 100,000 inhabitants in this urbanized town, progress is at its peak. The proposed Angono Fish Port to be constructed at the lakeside shore of Laguna de Bay will soon boost more business opportunities and easier access from the nearby towns situated at the shores of the said lake.

Angono is known as the Arts Capital of the Philippines. With the existence of numerous business establishments and leisure hubs/historical sites, this town is surely a tourist destination.

== Culture ==
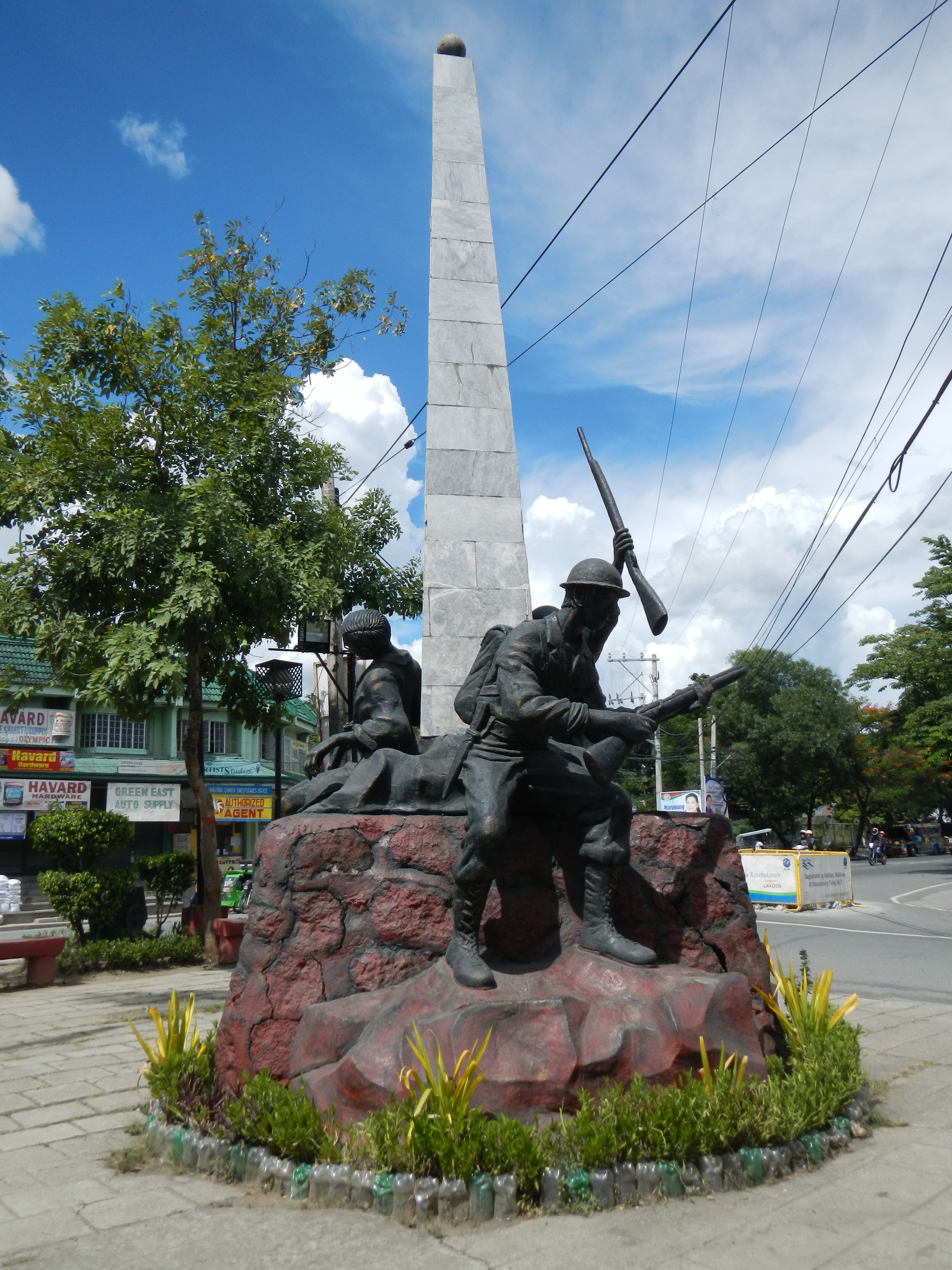
World War II Monument, Junction

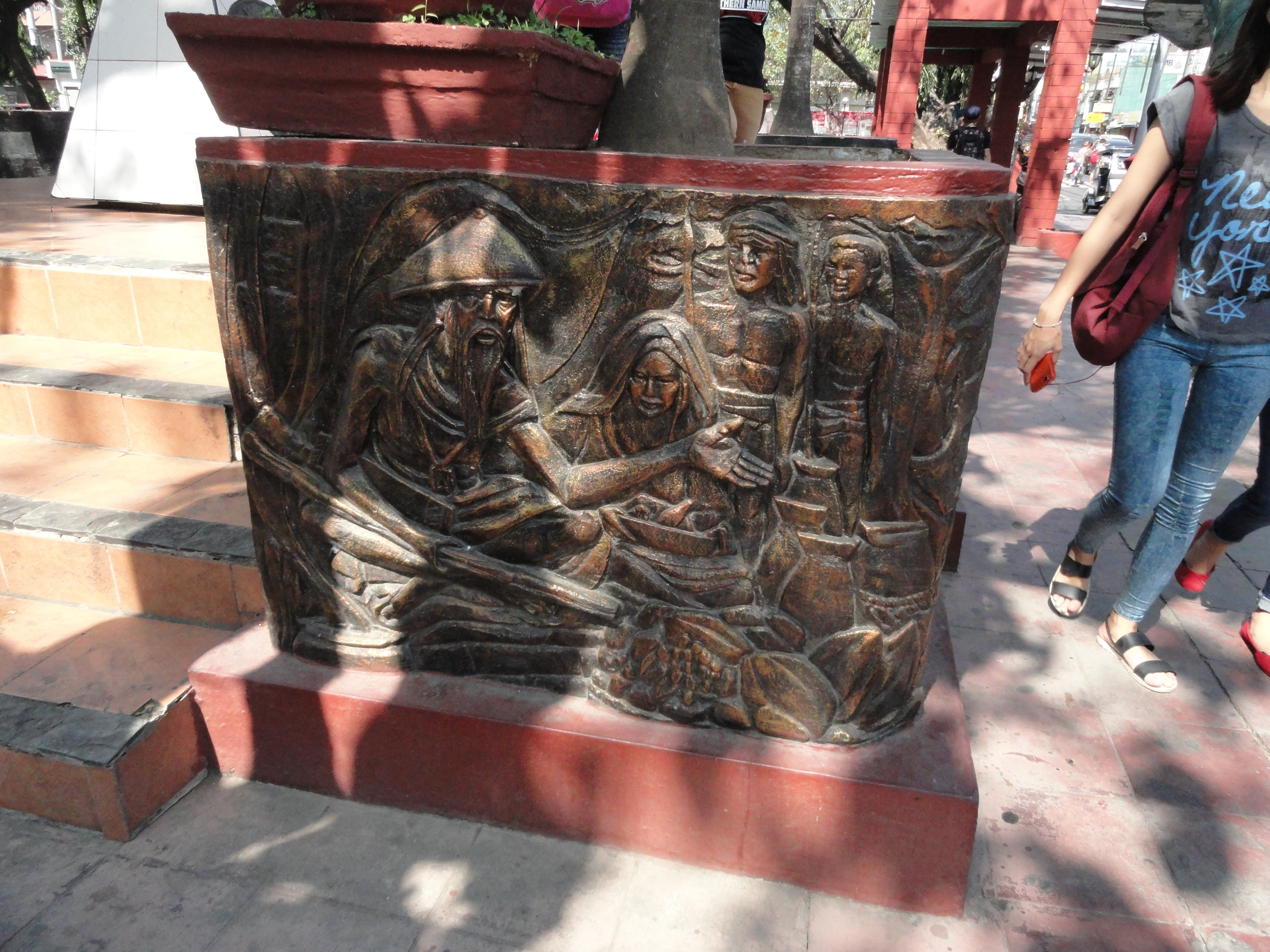
One of the numerous public artworks in Angono

Angono is the hometown of two national artists, Lucio San Pedro for music and Carlos "Botong" Francisco for visual arts. One of the public schools in Barangay Mahabang Parang is named Carlos "Botong" V. Francisco Memorial National High School in honor of the said artist. The town also boasts of other artists like Nemi Miranda (also known as Nemiranda), Perdigon Vocalan, Jose "Pitok" Blanco and the Blanco Family. Around the town are artworks such as various sculptures and murals.

Angono also boasts of several actors/actresses Joey Hipolito, Freddie Reynoso, Zoraida Sanchez, Mike Tan, Nikki Gil, and BJ Tolits Forbes; GMA TV Host Herlene "Hipon" Budol; news anchor Sandra Aguinaldo and film director Cathy Garcia-Molina.

The artistic town of Angono celebrates the feast of Pope Clement I every November 22 to 23 of each year. There are times that this coincides with the Feast of Christ the King. The celebration starts with the novena mass on the 14th till 22nd day of November, where devotees in prayer and thanksgiving dance in the church patio after each novena mass. The dancing is often accompanied by the symphonic/marching bands of Angono while church bells ring.

The town is currently campaigning for its inclusion in the UNESCO Creative Cities Network as a center for visual arts. It is also campaigning for the inclusion of the Angono Petroglyphs (1 of 5 properties of the Petroglyphs and Petrographs of the Philippines UNESCO tentative site) in the World Heritage List.

=== Bisperas Mayores ===
The Bisperas Mayores or the day before the feast day is celebrated with a parade of marching bands, drum and lyres sponsored by each barangay of Angono held in the morning and early afternoon. The morning parade usually starts in Rainbow Village and ends at the church patio where the devotees again dance in praise and thanksgiving while the marching bands play. The afternoon parade is also joined by papier-mâché higantes, local government officials and employees, commercial establishments in Angono, schools and other Angono socio and civic groups.

The celebration on the morning of November 23 starts with a concelebrated mass with the Bishop of Antipolo. The procession follows after the mass with parehadoras, higantes and devotees joining the image of St. Isidore the Laborer, Pope Clement I and the Virgin Mary in a procession leading to the banks of Laguna de Bay in Barangay San Vicente for the fluvial procession, fishes like kanduli, tilapia and bangus which are caught by the fishermen devotees during the fluvial procession are displayed near the image of Pope Clement I. The images, devotees and members of the band ride the pagoda for the procession in the lake which will disembark at another part of the Angono shoreline side of the lake in Barangay Poblacion Ibaba. The road procession will again start with merry making of parehadoras, higantes and wet devotees which will culminate in the church. Filipino artistry is truly alive in every celebration in Angono.

=== Cristo Rey ===
The Feast of Christ the King which is held on the Sunday before the 1st Sunday of Advent usually coincides with the feast of Pope Clement I. The Viva San Clemente! celebration banners usually include “Mabuhay ang Kristong Hari!” slogans to remind the people that Christ is the Lord and to proclaim Christ as the King of all nations. This is also a reminder that Pope Clement I is only a servant of God which somehow does not need adoration of the people because our Lord has already given him the highest honor – a blessing of a Saint – Angono's patron and inspiration.

Pope Clement I was the fourth pope of the Catholic Church after Pope Peter the prince of the apostles, Pope Linus, and Pope Anacletus. He faithfully proclaimed Christ during his time and until his martyrdom by being thrown into the sea attached to an iron anchor. The people of Angono celebrate Pope Clement I's feast day with a fluvial procession in the waters of Laguna de Bay as a reminder and inspiration of his faith in God.

=== Higantes Festival ===
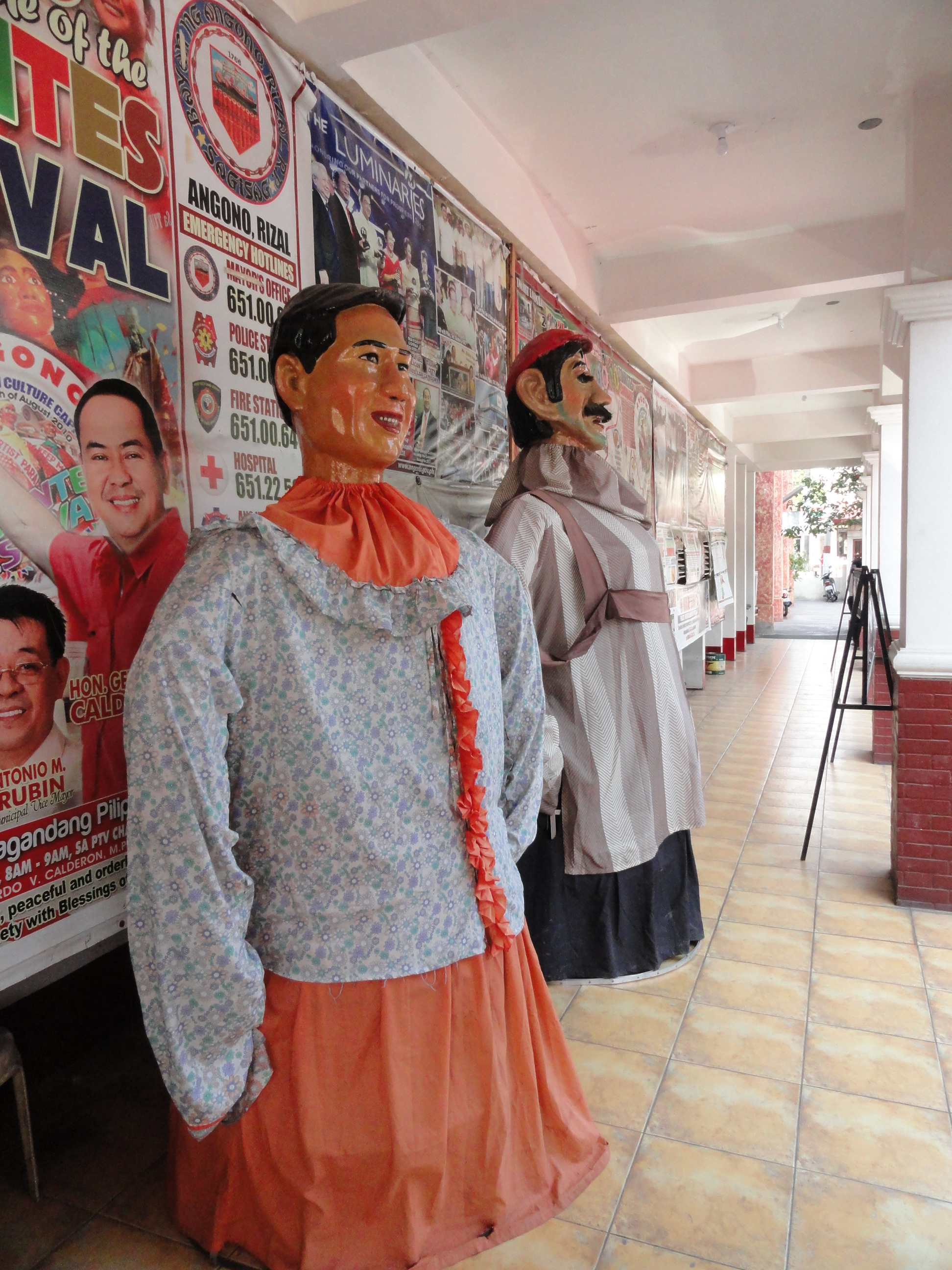
Higantes, along Angono Municipal Hall

Angono's joyous fiesta in honor of Pope Clement I whose image, resplendent in papal vestments, is held November 22–23, and involves a procession accompanied by parehadoras devotees dressed in colorful local costumes, wooden shoes and carrying boat paddles and higantes, giant papier-mâché effigies. The street event culminates in fluvial procession at Laguna de Bay amidst revelry that continues until the image is brought back to its sanctuary.

Higantes Festival is now promoted as tourism-generating event in the country. This attracts numerous tourists from all over the world.

It was said that the higantes started during the Spanish colonial times. When Angono was once a hacienda and ruled by Spanish hacienderos The Guido. The Angono land tillers' way of protesting their struggle was by making giant effigies of their landlords whose hands are usually high up on their waist.

The body of the traditional higante is made of bamboo and colorful cloth and its faces of papier-mâché. The three oldest higantes of Angono consists of a family of giants – the father, mother and child higante, they traditionally add color and fun during the fiesta celebration. It was in the 80s when then Angono artist Perdigon Vocalan brought the idea of the Higantes Festival by going out of the traditional family of giants and advocating having more higantes in the fiesta by coordinating with the barangays of Angono to come up with Higantes that will represent their barangay. At present, the Higantes of Angono can be seen in fiesta celebrations around the Philippines and in national cultural presentations, a highlight being the Centennial Parade in the Quirino Grandstand for the Philippine Centennial celebration in 1998.

The higantes are made of papier-mâché. Higantes measures four to five feet in diameter and ten to twelve feet in height. Traditionally, it began in the last century when Angono was a Spanish hacienda. These higantes were influenced by the Mexican art form of papier-mâché brought by the Spanish priests to the Philippines.

=== Parehadora ===
The traditional parehadoras are group of young girls holding paddles and wearing bakya or wooden slippers and dressed in a colorful outfit which joins the procession in the feast day of Pope Clement I. They usually march at the beat of the band playing alongside them. Now with a dying lake, the tradition of the Parehadora is now just a reminder that Angono was once a fishing village and thrives at the harvest of Laguna Lake.

=== Salubong ===
Black Saturday is highlighted by 3-hour presentation of “Vigilia na Muling Pagkabuhay” at the patio of the church. On Easter Sunday, a celebration is held as the reunion of the Risen Christ with Virgin Mary is reenacted. It is facilitated by a young girl inside an inverted giant paper flower suspended from a bamboo trellis who removes the mourning veil from Mary's head. The petals of the suspended flower are mechanically opened by giant birds attached to strings to reveal the girl inside. It is then followed by a religious dancing of young ladies called “Kapitana” and “Tenyenta”, to the tune of “Bati”.

== Government ==
Angono Municipal Hall

=== Local government ===
The municipality is governed by a municipal mayor designated as its local chief executive and by a municipal council as its legislative body in accordance with the Local Government Code. The mayor, vice mayor, and the councilors are elected directly by the people through an election which is being held every three years.

=== Elected officials ===
Sangguniang Bayan 2022-2025:

- Mayor: Jeri Mae Calderon (NPC)
- Vice Mayor: Gerardo Calderon (NPC)
- Councilors:
1. Arvin Villamayor (NPC)
2. Patnubay Tiamson (NP)
3. Roberto Sison Jr. (NPC)
4. Jhoana Duran (NPC)
5. Aurea Natividad (NPC)
6. Florinio Matusoc (NPC)
7. Maria Elena Ibañez (NPC)
8. Agustin Canlas (NPC)
- ABC / LNB President: Jonathan V. Hernandez
- SK President: Ivan Jeyo R. Ang

=== List of local chief executives ===
No.	Name	Title	Served (From)	Until
1	Antonio P. Ibañez	Mayor	1938	1940
2	Domingo S. Villamayor	Mayor	1940	1946
3	Demetrio Tolentino	Mayor	1946	1947
(1)	Antonio P. Ibañez	Mayor	1947	1950
4	Ponciano A. Rivera	Mayor	1950	1951
5	Roman S. Reyes	Mayor	1951	1955
6	Saturnino V. Tiamson	Mayor	1955	1968
(4)	Ponciano A. Rivera	Mayor	1968	1972
(6)	Saturnino V. Tiamson	Mayor	1972	1986
-	Nemesio B. Miranda	OIC	1986	1988
7	Vivencio B. Villamayor	Mayor	1988	1995
(6)	Saturnino V. Tiamson	Mayor	1995	1998
8	Gerardo V. Calderon	Mayor	1998	2007
9	Aurora A. Villamayor	Mayor	2007	2010
(8)	Gerardo V. Calderon	Mayor	2010	2019
10	Jeri Mae E. Calderon	Mayor	2019	2025
(8)	Gerardo V. Calderon	Mayor	2025	present

== Education ==
The Angono Schools District Office governs all educational institutions within the municipality. It oversees the management and operations of all private and public, from primary to secondary schools.

=== Primary and elementary schools ===
- ABC Learning Center
- ALC Academy
- Angono Christian School
- Angono Elementary School Central
- Baby Jesus Chrissamore Learning Center
- Blanco Family Academy
- Charis Praise Christian Academy
- Doña Nieves Songco Memorial Elementary School
- Faderoga's Learning Center
- Gingergrace Academe
- Hope Academy
- Jason Harvey Academy
- Joaquin Guido Elementary School
- Jonathan T.M. Caballero Academy of Special Needs
- Joyland Playschool Childcare and Learning Center
- Lakeside Hills Learning School
- Little Footprints Playschool and Tutorial Center
- Little Lambs Learning Center
- Maranatha Christian Academy
- Marrieve of Light School
- New Hope in Faith School
- Nuestra Senora De Guia Academy - East Rizal
- Praise Christian Academy
- Raises Academy
- Regional Lead School for the Arts in Angono
- Seven Angels Christian Academy
- Shinil Cristian Academy
- St. Catherine Learning Center
- St. John Learning Center
- St. Martin Montessori School
- Santo Entiero Learning Center
- San Vicente Elementary School
- Teensy Weensy Child Development Christian School

=== Secondary schools ===
- ALC High School
- Angono National High School
- Angono Private High School
- Carlos "Botong" V. Francisco Memorial National High School
- Carlos "Botong" V. Francisco Memorial National High School (Angono Annex)
- Carlos "Botong" Francisco Senior High School (Angono Annex)
- Crossmount School of Arts and Trades
- Dr. Vivencio B. Villamayor Integrated School
- Holy Deliverance Integrated Christian School
- Mind Slot Integrated School
- Regional Lead School for the Arts in Angono

=== Higher educational institutions ===
- Angono Catholic College
- Christ the King College
- Eastern Light College
- Seven Angels College
- University of Rizal System Angono Campus

== Healthcare ==
- Angono Medics Hospital
- Angono Super Health Center
- St. Clement Medical, Inc.
- Rizal Provincial Hospital (Angono Annex)
- San Isidro Hospital
- San Isidro Hospital (Angono Annex)
- Mikko Medics Medical Maternity & Lying-in Clinic

== Notable personalities ==
- Herlene Budol (b. 1999), model, comedian, actress, and beauty pageant titleholder
- Lucio San Pedro (1932–2002), composer and teacher
- Zorayda Sanchez (1951–2008), comedian, actress, television and film scriptwriter
- Christian Standhardinger (b. 1989), Filipino-German basketball player
- Malupiton (b. 1998), social media personality and entertainer
- Mike Tan (b. 1986), actor, dancer, and model
- Arvin Tolentino (b. 1995), basketball player
- Miho Nishida (b. 1992), television personality

== See also ==
- List of Cultural Properties of the Philippines in Angono, Rizal
