= Danny Ching =

American paddleboarder and canoe paddler

Daniel Dawson Hepala Hakuole Ching is a professional standup paddleboarder and outrigger canoe paddler from Redondo Beach, California, United States.

== Achievements ==
- Winner of the 2010 Rainbow Sandals Battle of the Paddle (standup paddle boarding World Championship) Elite Race.
- 3rd-place finish at the 2011 Rainbow Sandals Battle of the Paddle Elite Race.
- Winner of the 2012 Rainbow Sandals Battle of the Paddle Elite Race
- 3rd-place finish at the 2013 Rainbow Sandals Battle of the Paddle Elite Race.
- 3rd-place finish at the 2014 Rainbow Sandals Battle of the Paddle Elite Race.
- Three-time winner of the Molokai Solo Outrigger World Championship, in 2010, 2013, and 2023.
- Winner of The Wild Buffalo Relay (With partner Ryland Hart).
