= Ian Ching =

New Zealand cricketer

Personal information
- Full name: Ian Hamilton Ching
- Born: 25 November 1928; Te Mawhai, Waikato, New Zealand
- Died: 2 February 2006 (aged 77); Rotorua, New Zealand
- Batting: Left-handed
- Role: Wicket-keeper

Domestic team information
- Years: Team
- 1950/51–1955/56: Central Districts

Career statistics
Competition	First-class
Matches	8
Runs scored	173
Batting average	13.30
100s/50s	0/0
Top score	47
Catches/stumpings	7/1
- Source: Cricinfo, 3 February 2019

Ian Hamilton Ching (25 November 1928 – 2 February 2006) was a New Zealand cricketer who played first-class cricket for Central Districts from 1951 to 1955, and Hawke Cup cricket for Nelson from 1947 to 1960.

Ian Ching was a wicket-keeper and lower-order batsman. In Hawke Cup cricket he batted higher in the order. In 1958–59, when Nelson gained and held the Hawke Cup, he was the leading scorer in the competition with 286 runs at an average of 47.66. In 1950–51, in his first two first-class matches, he played as a batsman, taking part in Central Districts' first two first-class victories, though his contributions with the bat were modest, and he was discarded for the last match of the Plunket Shield season.
