= Leo Renier =

Belgian musician and former Roman Catholic priest

Leo Renier is a former Roman Catholic priest and Belgian musician, living in the Philippines since 1969, responsible for the preservation of the Spanish Historical Organs in the Philippines and the revival of its organ culture. He is the moving spirit behind the performance of Baroque music in a country, which eventually may lead to the discovery of Philippine Baroque music. He is the founder of the Las Piñas Boys Choir (1969) and of the International Bamboo Organ Festival, held every year since 1976 at the St. Joseph’s Church of Las Piñas, Metro Manila, a former school director of St. Joseph's Academy until 1994.

== Early life and career ==
Born in Hasselt (Belgium) on February 22, 1944, he is the 6th child of a family of nine. Since grade 3 he was a member of the boys' choir (Saviozangers) of the"St.Jozefscollege" in his hometown Hasselt (Belgium). Two of the former choir conductors, Leo Van Nevel and Paul Schollaert who later played a major role in the choir life of Flandres, have influenced his involvement in music for the rest of his life. During his high school days (1952–61), he took up organ (with Albert van den Born, organist at the Basilica of Our Lady in Tongeren, Belgium) and music history (with Camille Swinnen, musicologist and founder of the “Basilica Concerten”) at the Municipal Conservatory in Hasselt.

He joined the Mission Congregation of Scheut (CICM) in 1962. During his formation years, he was in charge of the Schola (Gregorian chant) and the liturgical music. When studying in Louvain (1964–68), he was a member of the team which spearheaded the renewal of liturgical music at the University Parish in line with the new directions of the Second Vatican Council. During that same period, he took up private lessons in harmony with Frans Mariman.

== Las Piñas Boys Choir ==
He arrived in the Philippines in February 1969 and attended a language course before being assigned to the Parish of St.Joseph in Las Piñas, home of the Bamboo Organ. He stayed there as assistant parish priest and director of the parochial school until 1994. Soon after his arrival, he formed the "Himig Kawayan Boys Choir", which had their first public appearance during the Midnight Mass of Christmas of the same year. Three years later, the choir participated in the First National Children's Choir Competition, organized at the Cultural Center of the Philippines, where they ended with a third prize. Because of the many engagements that followed, Leo Renier contacted Engracio Tempongko, who had been the assistant of Fr.John Van de Steen CICM, conductor of the then famous Manila Cathedral Choir during the 60’s. The name of the choir was changed into the “Las Piñas Boys Choir”. And when they participated in the Third National Children’s Choir Competition in 1975, the choir ended first. History has proven that the choir has become the place to provide the musicians the Bamboo Organ needs to safeguard its future. Several of the alumni have taken up a career in music, among them the present conductor of the choir, Armando Salarza, and the organ builder Cealwyn Tagle.

== The Restoration of the Bamboo Organ and the yearly Festival ==
Leo Renier, together with his colleague Fr. Mark Lesage, spearheaded the restoration of the Bamboo Organ done by Johannes Klais Orgelbau in Bonn, Germany (1973–75). While the organ was in Bonn, he undertook a study trip to Graus and Roda de Isábena in Spain, in search for the background of Fr. Diego Cera, the builder of the Bamboo Organ. After the organ was flown back to the Philippines by SABENA Belgian World Airlines (free of charge), he initiated the International Bamboo Organ Festival and became its first artistic director (1976–94). The Festival received its much-needed support from the Cultural Center of the Philippines and their president Dr.Lucresia R.Kasilag, the various embassies, and the private sector so that soon the Festival firmly established itself as part of the cultural life of Metro Manila.

== Training of Filipino organists ==
But the restoration of the Bamboo Organ would not be complete without training local organists. In cooperation with the Goethe Institut Manila, he organized for 3 consecutive years (1976–78) a workshop for organists, conducted by Wolfgang Oehms in order to develop an organ school where young boys and girls would be trained to play the Bamboo Organ. Among the participants was the music and piano teacher of St.Joseph’s Academy, Donna Ofrasio, who soon became the resident organist, teacher of the Bamboo Organ and wife of the then priest, Leo Renier. Some 40 local students were trained under her tutelage between 1977 and 1994.

In 1979, Leo Renier became director of the St.Joseph’s Academy (SJA) of Las Piñas . Under his administration, a Technical School was built with the help of the Belgian Government, offering courses in auto mechanics, electronics, electricity, and metal to the 3rd and 4th year students of SJA. He was also assigned as National Director of Chiro Philippines (1978-1992).

He resumed his position as conductor of the Las Piñas Boys Choir and expanded the choir by letting the previous members after the mutation of their voices join as tenors and basses. The yearly Festival now became the venue where the boys were exposed to the great choral works by J.S.Bach, Mozart and, Haydn, with Miles Morgan as Festival conductor from 1982 to 2000. At the same time, the resident organist was exposed to the teaching methods of the visiting organist (among them Peter Hurfort, Luigi F.Tagliavini, Guy Bovet, Stanislas Deriemaeker, Hans and Martin Haselböck).

Results followed soon. In 1982, a long-term cooperation was established with the Institute for Churchmusic in Graz, and their director Dr.Johann Trummer, providing scholarships for young talents from Las Piñas, selected from among the members of the Las Piñas Boys Choir and the piano/organ department of SJA. Among them were Armando Salarza, Gerardo Fajardo and Bernabe Palabay as organ scholars; Cealwyn Tagle and Edgar Montiano (1969-2002) as organ builders. This development had been without any doubt the result of the restoration of the Bamboo Organ, which from long before it was granted the title, behaved like a real "National Treasure": for the benefit of the national musical heritage.

== The 300 years old Philippine organ tradition ==
In October 1977, Hans Gerd Klais has undertaken a study trip to the islands of Cebu and Bohol and requested Leo Renier to accompany him. It was the beginning of the making of an inventory of the few historical Spanish organs the Philippines possessed: these instruments were completely forgotten and in most cases abandoned. The following organs were visited: Argao in Cebu (still playable), and Loboc, Baclayon, Loay, Maribojoc and Antiquera in Bohol. Klais published an article about his findings with technical descriptions and drawings in “Acta Organologica”. It was obvious that these instruments were endangered, as was already the case in Antiquera with only a few pipes and the windchest stored in the church tower. But a restoration like the one undertaken for the Bamboo Organ would be too costly and unaffordable. The only solution would be the transfer of technology, by having a Filipino organ builder.

== A Philippine organ builder ==
In 1988, Cealwyn Tagle was sent to Austria to work as an apprentice at the workshop of organ builder Helmut Allgauer in Grünbach am Schneeberg. Being a family enterprise, his exposure involved all aspects of the crafts starting with the selection of the woods, the making of the technical drawings and ending with the voicing of the organ. He was joined two years later by Edgar Montiano (+2002). In 1992, they moved to Klais Orgelbau in Bonn each for their own specialization, to become part of the team which would build the Klais organ in the EDSA Shrine in Manila.

If the Las Piñas Bamboo Organ would always be in need of a good organist, there would also be a need in the future for a second pipe organ to play the music that was not playable at the Bamboo Organ. Funds were gathered for the construction of a practice organ in Las Piñas to be ready by the time Armando Salarza would return to Las Piñas after finishing his studies in Austria (1992).

As a first step, in 1989 Renier had a new wing constructed (the Centennial Building) on the school grounds of SJA, with a new library, 10 classrooms, and an auditorium which would eventually house the practice organ. This “Auditorium Organ” would also become a final thesis for the two Filipino apprentices to prove their skill as organ builders.

The organ was inaugurated on February 21, 1994. In the same year, Renier assisted in the establishment of the “Diego Cera Organ Builders” (DCOB) who put up their workshop in Talon (Las Piñas) to become a self-sustaining enterprise. He negotiated with Fr.Pedro G.Galende OSA the restoration of the organ of San Agustin in Intramuros, which would become the first historical organ in the country to be restored by the DCOB (completed in 1998). It appeared now that all these muted instruments soon would be able to speak again.

== Social engagement, educator and editor ==
After having served Las Piñas for 25 years, Leo Renier became an NGO-worker, and founded the “Center for Small Entrepreneurs” (CSE) with their offices in the Asian Social Institute (ASI). He left priesthood and married Donna Ofrasio, a music teacher in the parochial school which he served as director until 1994, and moved to Silang, where he engaged in hog farming for 10 years. But his expertise and care for the Philippine organ patrimony never left him.

He was a consultant for church music at the Manila Cathedral Basilica, Intramuros, Manila (2006-2009). He engaged in teaching church music at the Maryhill School of Theology (SY 2007-2009) and was invited as a resource person on liturgical music for the First Liturgical Music Congress held in San Beda College, Mendiola, Manila ( October 29–30, 2013) and for the 9th Biennial National Convention of Church Cultural Heritage practitioners in Sorsogon (1 – 4 June 2015). He organized the yearly Summer Course for Church musicians in Las Piñas since 2012. He was also a contributor to the Geschichte der Kirchenmusik published by Laaber Verlag (2014).

Since 2009, he became again a member of the program committee of the International Bamboo Organ Festival, became a trustee of the Bamboo Organ Foundation in 2013 and was appointed as Executive Director of the International Bamboo Organ Festival. Renier took the initiative to have the liturgical repertoire of Nic Sengson performed during the 37th (“Awitan Kristo”) and 40th (“Exodus”) International Bamboo Organ Festival.

To make organ music available for Filipino organists, Renier made use of the computer programs so that decent scores of otherwise unavailable music for a divided keyboard (one of the characteristics of the colonial organs) would be within the reach of student organists. Without these ready-for-use scores available, Filipino organ students would not be able to demonstrate the real personality of the Spanish organs. At the same time, to combat the wrong practices of organists who were adjusting to the electronic organ and were using the entertaining style fitted to these instruments, he made organ accompaniments available for some 150 popular hymns.

== Publications ==
Editor of the liturgical compositions of Nicolas Matias Sengson SVD:

- 2008 “Kaliwanagan” for LOGOS PUBLICATIONS
- 2008 “Pagkabuhay” for LOGOS PUBLICATIONS
- 2013 “Salmodios” responsorial psalms with organ accompaniments (219 p) – limited edition

Organ accompaniments for:

- 2012 “The Philippine Organ Companion. Vol.1” – limited edition
- 2014 “The Philippine Organ Companion. Vol.2” – limited edition

Editor of:

- 2013 “Organ Variations on Philippine Folktunes” by Wolfgang Oehms– limited edition
- 2015 “The Las Piñas Orgel-Büchlein” by Guy Bovet – limited edition
- 2014 “Anthology for Filipino Organists Vol 1 – Spanish Organ School” (117 p.)
- 2014 “Anthology for Filipino Organists Vol 2 - Spanish Organ School“ (114 p.)
- 2015 “Anthology for Filipino Organists Vol 3 – English, French, Flemish, German and Italian Organ School” (126 p.)

== The Historical organs of the Philippines ==
The Diocese of Bohol with its magnificent baroque churches is the keeper of seven out of 17 historical organs (Baclayon, Dimiao, Garcia Hernandez, Loay, Loboc, Loon and Maribojoc) . The Boholanos developed over the years a very strong awareness of their cultural heritage. They have a professionally trained curator in charge: Fr.Milan Ted D.Torralba. Having now an organ builder in the country, they were the first to take advantage of the situation and engaged in the restoration of the organs in Loay (1999), Loboc (2003) and Baclayon (2008).

With the number of playable instruments steadily increasing, the possibility was discussed with Guy Bovet when performing for the 7th time at the International Bamboo Organ Festival in 2010, to make the existence of an Iberian organ tradition in the Philippines known to the rest of the world by means of a recording. His acquaintance with the Spanish organ tradition and its literature and his equal familiarity with the Philippines made him the ideal person to be entrusted with a project featuring the character of each of the six instruments. Sound engineer was Claude Maréchaux. Both had to work in sometimes extremely difficult circumstances to get a quiet environment, even at night. Together with the 4 CD’s, a booklet was produced containing a first written history of the pipe organs in the Philippines. The launching of the CD’s took place on 17 November 2011 in the church of San Agustin in Intramuros, and so the name “The Historical Organs of the Philippines” had been coined. The Bamboo Organ stopped being a single curiosity: it now became part of a cultural history which sadly had been forgotten.

On August 5, 2011, King Albert II of Belgium had conferred on Renier the Knighthood in the Order of the Crown for his cultural and social contributions to the Philippines.

== The Bohol earthquake (October 15, 2013) ==
However, the same problem as the one that had plagued Las Piñas soon became obvious in Bohol: without organists, the money spent for the restoration of these instruments would be a waste. Leo Renier discussed this problem with Usec. Daniel Corpuz of the Department of Tourism. A budget of Php.200,000 was soon approved by the DOT. The 2 days long monthly workshop was conducted by Mrs. Donna O.Renier for advanced piano students between November 2012 and October 2013. The training program came to an abrupt end with the earthquake of October 15, 2013.

The 3 restored organs (Baclayon, Loay and Loboc) only experienced minor damages: the Filipino restorer, Cealwyn Tagle, had glued the joints together as an additional security, being aware that an eventual earthquake would have shaken the organ case so that the entire organ would have fallen apart. The organ of Loboc was the only one in continuous danger since it was leaning forward hooked into a wall with cracks. Two more organs in Loon and Maribojoc (not yet restored) were completely buried under the rubble of a totally destroyed church.

Only one month earlier, Leo Renier had submitted a petition (including an inventory) to the National Museum, to have all 17 Historical Organs of the Philippines declared National Cultural Treasures. This request had been endorsed on September 12, 2013, by the National Commission for Culture and the Arts (NCCA) and on September 27, 2013, by the National Historical Commission of the Philippines (NHCP). Fortunately, that so much awareness around the pipe organs had been built up during the previous years, if not they would have disappeared into complete oblivion, as what had happened during previous centuries with so many Filipino pipe organs hit by an earthquake.

Leo Renier was requested by the NHCP to make an assessment of the five organs in Bohol, and to participate at the Expert’s Conference held on 17–20 November 2014 in Cebu and Tagbilaran. While waiting for the rehabilitation or reconstruction of the churches, the three organs of Loboc, Loay and Baclayon have been dismantled (2014–15) and kept in bodegas; in Loon and Maribojoc, all organ parts have been carefully recovered together with all other artworks.

In 2014, Leo Renier negotiated with the Department of Tourism the initial funding of the restoration of the 3 remaining Spanish organs in Cebu: Argao, Dalaguete and Boljoon. The first two have been dismantled (Sept.1-10, 2015) and were transported to the workshop of the Diego Cera Organ Builders. With the help of Prof.Guido Dedene and Cealwyn Tagle, he opened a website “Organographia Philipiniana” with a complete inventory of all the pipe organs in the Philippines, to bring the country back on the map of Iberian Organ tradition (together with Spain, Portugal, Mexico, Latin America).
