= Contagious (Sitti album) =

Studio album by Sitti Navarro
- Released: 2009
- Recorded: 2009
- Genre: Bossa nova, jazz
- Length: 62:03
- Label: Warner Music Philippines
- Producer: Jim Baluyut, Neil C. Gregorio

Sitti Navarro chronology
Ngayong Pasko (2008)	Contagious (2009)

Singles from Sitti
- 1. "Is This Love"

Contagious is the third full-length studio album of Philippine bossa nova singer Sitti, after 2006's Café Bossa and 2007's My Bossa Nova. It was released in mid-2009.

== Track listing ==
1. "Your Love Is King" (Sade Adu, Stuart Matthewman) - 4:32
2. "How Insensitive (Insensatez)" (Antonio Carlos Jobim, Vinicius de Moraes, Norman Gimbel) - 5:04
3. "Is This Love" (George Noriega, Jorge Gonzalez, Andrew Fromm, Howard Dorough, Merecco Turner) - 4:05
4. "Adia" (Pierre Marchand, Sarah McLachlan) - 4:34
5. "Chega de Saudade" (Jobim, de Moraes) - 4:05
6. "A Certain Sadness" (Carlos Eduardo Lyra, John Court) - 3:26
7. "So Em Teus Braços" (Jobim) - 2:16
8. "Dindi" (Jobim, Aloysio de Oliveria) - 5:13
9. "La-La (Means I Love You)" (Thom Bell, William Hart) - 3:58
10. "Do You Really Want to Hurt Me" (Culture Club) - 4:23
11. "No More I Love You's" (Joseph Hughes, David Freeman) - 3:44
12. "Let Me In" (Mike Francis) - 3:41
13. "Promises / New Day for You" (Basia, Danny White, Peter Ross) - 4:46
14. "One on One" (Daryl Hall) - 3:03
15. "Till There Was You" (Meredith Willson) - 2:56
16. "Bossa Nova Baby" (Jerry Leiber, Mike Stoller) - 2:25

== Personnel ==
- Sitti Navarro - vocals
- Chito Servañez - piano
- Erskine Basilio - nylon guitar
- Sonny Teodoro - percussion
- Rex Nosares - electric / upright bass
- Archie Lacorte - saxophone, flute
- Gian Vergel - drums
