= Las Piñas Boys Choir =

Philippine boys choir

- Choir
- Former name: Himig Kawayan Boys Choir of Las Piñas
- Origin: Las Piñas, Metro Manila, Philippines
- Founded: 1969
- Founder: Leo Renier
- Notable members: Armando Salarza

The Las Piñas Boys Choir is a Filipino boys' choir that performs regularly around the Parish of St. Joseph in Las Piñas, Metro Manila, and around the world. The choir performs annually at the International Bamboo Organ Festival, the parish church being home to the world's oldest and largest bamboo organ built in 1816. Each Christmas, thousands travel to watch the choir perform at midnight mass.

== History ==
The choir was founded in 1969 by Belgian priest, Father Leo Renier. Reiner, who was the assistant parish priest of Las Piñas Parish at the time, proposed a boys' choir to play during midnight Christmas mass.

The choir was originally known as the Himig Kawayan Boys Choir of Las Piñas but began to be called the Las Piñas Boys Choir during the 1970s.

In 1972, the choir entered the First Children’s Choir Competition at the Cultural Center of the Philippines (CCP), where they won third place. In 1974, they won the Third Children’s Choir Competition. After this showing, the choir began to receive invitations to perform outside Las Piñas.

== Activities ==
The choir performs annually at the International Bamboo Organ Festival, while thousands travel each Christmas to see the choir perform at St. Joseph's Church. The choir has also performed at Cultural Center of the Philippines and numerous times at Malacañang Palace, the official residence of the President of the Philippines.

In 2007, the choir was featured on the song I'll be Home for Christmas by Philippine Idol winner, Sitti, on her album Ngayong Pasko, and accompanied her on stage at the I'll be Home for Christmas concert. The Christmas album went gold after one month and later platinum.

In 2008, the choir participated in the 5th World Choir Games, winning gold and silver medals. The 20 boys won gold in the children’s category and silver in the sacred music category.

Following their win, a resolution was moved in the Philippine Senate recognising the group. The same year, the group also sang the national anthem at a Senate session.

In 2012, the choir was ranked the 124th best choir in the world by Interkultur.

== Works ==
- Bamboo Organ Inaugural Concerts. Las Piñas Boys Choir. LP, 1975. Wolfgang Oehms, organ.
- Christmas Carols on the Las Piñas Bamboo Organ. Las Piñas Boys Choir. LP, 1975. Engracio Tempongko, Zenas Reyes Lozada, accompanist.
- A Philippine Christmas At The Las Piñas Bamboo Organ. The Las Piñas Boys Choir, Vince Gomez, Manuel Maramba – Pasko Sa Las Piñas. Cassette. 1982.
- Missa Mysterium. 1997. Francisco Feliciano, Philippine Philharmonic Orchestra, Rachelle Gerodias, Jai Sabas Aracama, Lemuel de la Cruz, Jonathan Velasco, The Philippines Madrigal Singers, AILM Chorale, Las Piñas Mixed Choir. CD, 1997.

== Choir directors ==
- Armando Salarza,
- Dick Mazo
- Vince Gomez

== Members ==
The members of the choir consists of scholarship students at St. Joseph's Academy of Las Piñas and other schools within Las Piñas City.

A number of the boys have gone onto become renowned musicians, including:

- Armando Salarza, concert organist, harpsichordist, conductor and sixth conductor of the Las Piñas Boys Choir
- Cealwyn Tagle, the Philippines' only organ builder
- Eugene de los Santos, Director of the Philippine Philharmonic Orchestra
- Noli Vicedo, Professor of Fine Arts, University of Santo Tomas
