= LPBC =

LPBC may refer to:

- Las Piñas Boys Choir, a Filipino boys' choir
- Lord Protector Boat Club, the alumni section of the Sidney Sussex College Boat Club
- Luther Point Bible Camp, a Bible camp in Wisconsin
