= Saint Joseph's Academy (Las Piñas) =

Coordinates: 14°28′54″N 120°58′52″E

St. Joseph's Academy of Las Piñas

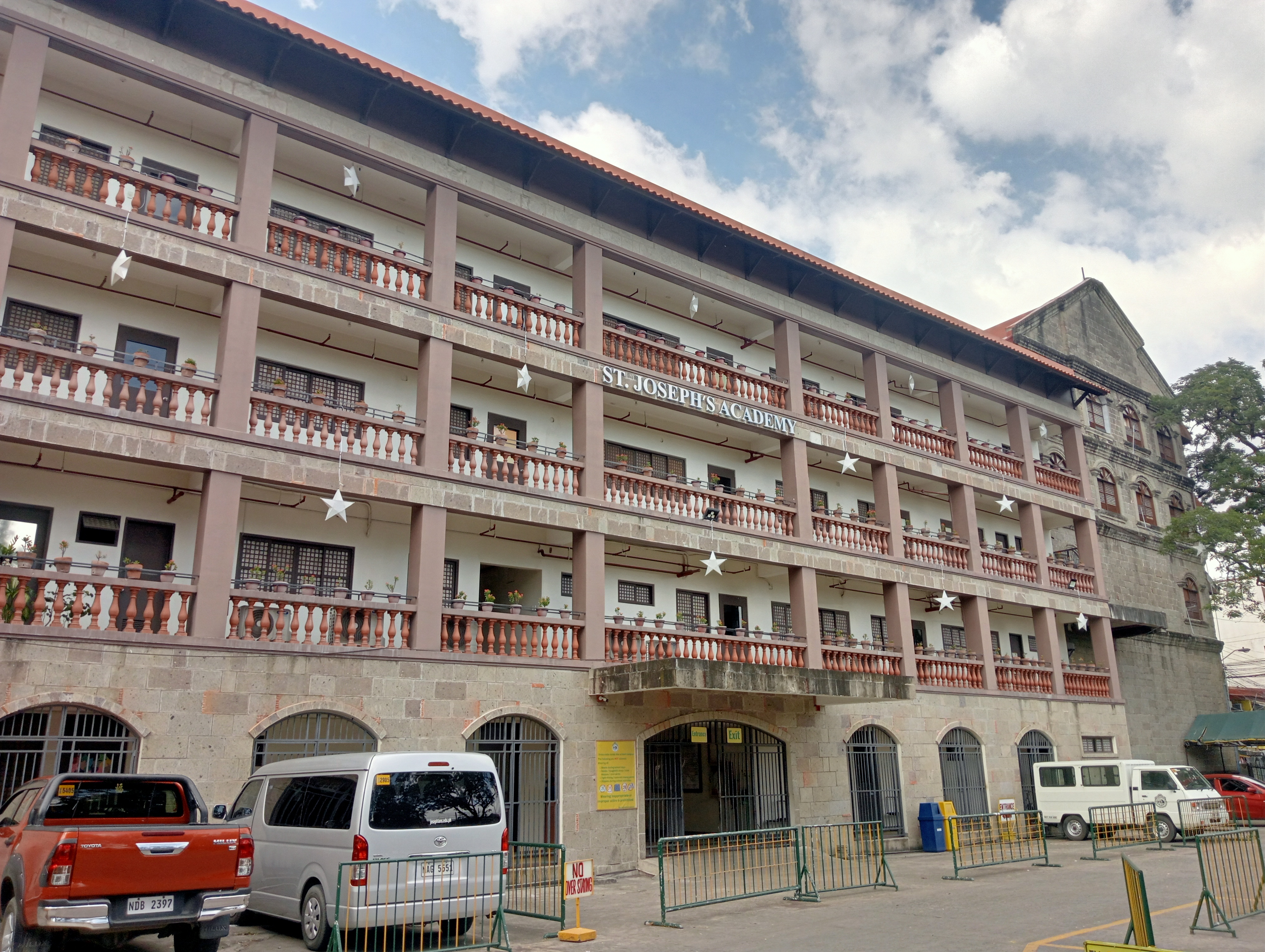

Location
- Padre Diego Cera Avenue, Barangay Daniel Fajardo; Las Piñas, Metro Manila; Philippines

Information
- Type: Coeducational, Catholic
- Established: 1916
- Director: Fr. Rolando R. Agustin
- Principal: Peter Andres Principal; Maricel Laborera Vice Principal
- Grades: K to 12
- Campus: Urban, ~14,500 m²
- Color
- Accreditation: PAASCU
- Website: www.josephians.edu.ph

St. Joseph's Academy of Las Piñas, referred to as SJA, is a private school established in 1914 by Congregatio Immaculati Cordis Mariae (CICM) offering Kindergarten to Grade 12.

== History ==
St. Joseph's Academy of Las Piñas was founded in 1914 by Belgian missionaries Fr. Jose van Runenkelen and Fr. Victor Zaiel of Congregatio Immaculati Cordis Mariae (CICM) established next to the St. Joseph Parish Church (where the famous Las Piñas Bamboo Organ is housed) to foster literacy in the parish community. The school, which started as a grade school, eventually included secondary education and was renamed to St. Joseph's Academy. The school was recognized by the American colonial government of the Philippine Islands on July 27, 1916 and is its recognized legal foundation day. St. Joseph's Academy is the first Catholic private school of Las Piñas and other neighboring towns. The first batch of grade school graduates of the academy was produced in 1922.

Grand Centennial Celebration

St. Joseph's Academy celebrated its Grand Centennial year in 2016, bringing together the men and women who walked the halls of their beloved school through the decades. SJA continues to thrive amidst changes and challenges, bringing 21st Century Learning closer to the hearts and minds of Josephian 21st Century learners.

== Notable alumni ==
- Gio Alvarez (Class of 1995) -Actor and TV personality. He is a former Star Magic artist (tenure: 1992–2004). He is notable for the TV series Ang TV and Home Along Da Riles (tv series and movies).
- Luigi Alvarez (Class of 1993) - Former actor and TV personality. He is the brother of Gio Alvarez. Luigi was a former Star Magic artist (tenure: 1995–1997). He is notable for the TV series Ang TV.
- Cheryl Fuerte (Class of 1995) - Award-winning web designer. One of the blogging pioneers in the Philippines.
- Armando Salarza (Class of 1984) - Notable organist and conductor of Las Piñas Boys Choir.
- Leinil Francis Yu (Class of 1994) - Comic book artist and Guinness World Records holder.

== See also ==
- Las Piñas Boys Choir
- Bamboo Organ
- Las Piñas Church
- Las Piñas
