= Las Piñas Church =

Roman Catholic church in Las Piñas, Philippines

- Diocesan Shrine and Parish of Saint Joseph
- Bamboo Organ Church
- Iglesia Parroquial de San José de Las Piñas (Spanish); Iglesia del Órgano de Bambú
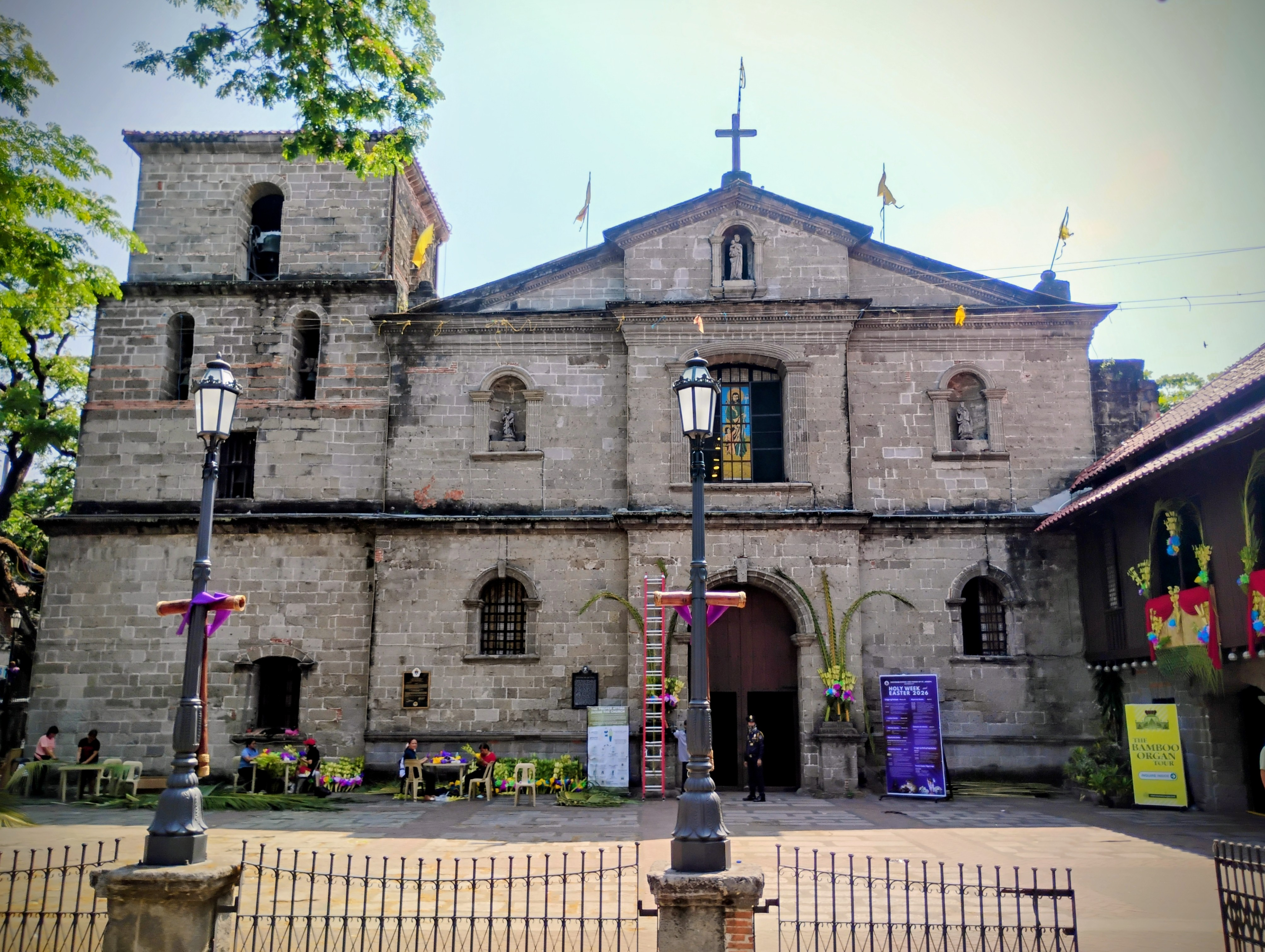
- Church facade in March 2026

- Location in Metro Manila Location in Luzon Location in the Philippines
- 14°28′52″N 120°58′53″E
- Location: Las Piñas, Metro Manila
- Country: Philippines
- Denomination: Roman Catholic

History
- Former name: Saint Joseph Parish Church
- Status: Parish church
- Founded: 1795
- Founder: Diego Cera de la Virgen del Carmen
- Dedication: Saint Joseph
- Events: International Bamboo Organ Festival

Architecture
- Functional status: Active
- Heritage designation: National Historical Commission of the Philippines
- Designated: July 15, 2013
- Architectural type: Church building
- Style: Earthquake Baroque
- Groundbreaking: 1797
- Completed: 1819

Specifications
- Length: 110 feet (34 m)
- Width: 94 feet (29 m)
- Materials: Adobe (volcanic) stones

Administration
- Province: Manila
- Diocese: Parañaque
- Deanery: Saint Joseph
- Parish: Saint Joseph

Clergy
- Priest: Roberto A. Olaguer

The Diocesan Shrine and Parish of Saint Joseph, commonly known as Las Piñas Church or Bamboo Organ Church, is a Roman Catholic parish church in Las Piñas, just south of the city of Manila in the Philippines. It nestles in the heart of Barangay Daniel Fajardo, one of the oldest districts of Las Piñas. The church is renowned to house the Bamboo Organ, a pipe organ made mostly with bamboo pipes. To the right of the church is an old Spanish convent converted into a gift shop and the entrance for observing the organ up close. Also in the church complex is St. Joseph's Academy, a private, Catholic primary and secondary education school established in 1914.

The parish is under the jurisdiction of the Diocese of Parañaque. The parish priest has been Roberto A. Olaguer since July 11, 2020.

== History ==
=== Establishment ===
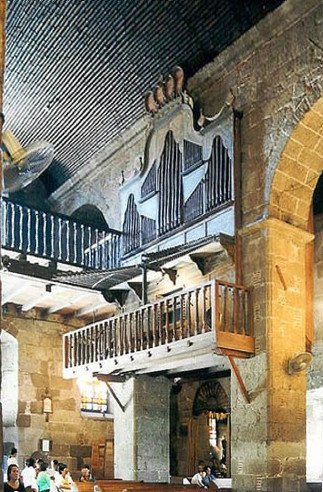
Bamboo Organ

On November 5, 1795, the Archbishop of Manila assigned Las Piñas, then a small town of farmers and fishermen, to the Augustinian Recollects to establish a new church. Diego Cera de la Virgen del Carmen, a native of Spain, traveled from Mabalacat, Pampanga province and arrived on the town on the day after Christmas of 1795. Soon after, he started building the church made from adobe (volcanic) stones in the Earthquake Baroque architectural style.

The new parish priest was a gifted man. He was a natural scientist, chemist, architect, community leader, as well as organist and organ builder. He also built the organs for the Manila Cathedral and San Nicolas de Tolentino Church, the main Augustinian church in the old walled city of Manila. In 1816, when the stone church was almost complete, he started building the organ made of bamboo and completed the instrument in 1824.

Diego Cera served as the parish priest of Las Piñas till May 15, 1832, when he could no longer perform his duties due to severe illness. He died on June 24, 1832, in Manila.

== Architectural history of Las Piñas Church ==
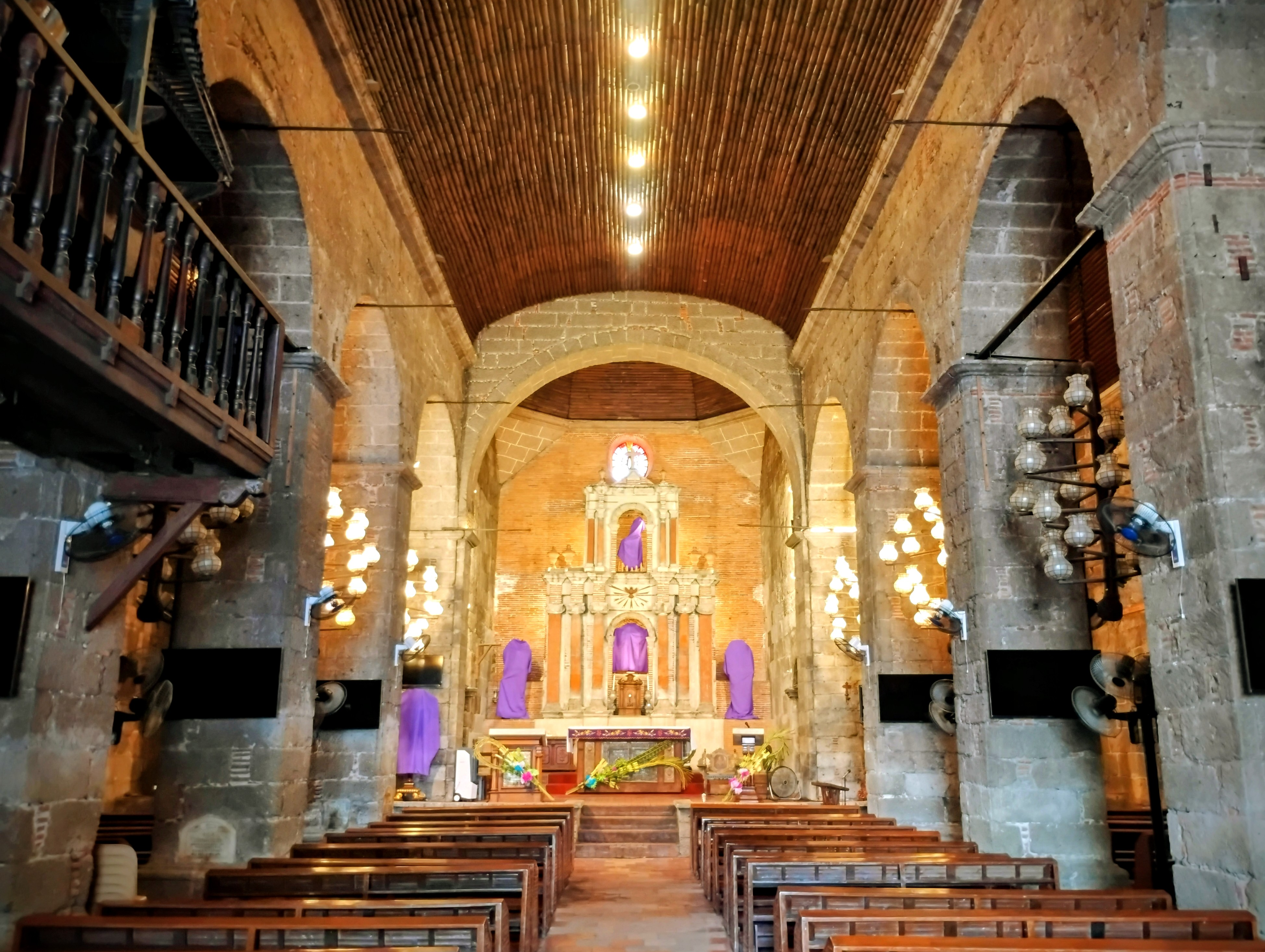
Church interior in 2026

=== Initial construction ===
During that period, Las Piñas was a third class municipality. The natives were mostly salt bed tenders, fishermen, farmers, laborers, embroiderers, and others engaged in small businesses. Despite the condition of the parish, Cera set a goal to construct a temporary chapel and convent near the seashore made out of nipa and bamboo. The inhabitants, which were only 1,200 before, saw his dedication and in return helped him in construction by means of manual labor or donating construction materials.

=== Evolution of architecture style ===
From perishable materials, the natives, together with Cera, aspired of establishing a stone church. It will serve as the inhabitant's protection from outsiders and natural calamities. In 1797, Cera bought the present site of the church for only one hundred and fifty pesos. There was an existing house standing at that period, which belonged to the Recollect estate. He initiated and drew architectural plans for the stone church. While the foundations were being laid, big store rooms were built to keep construction materials. After three years, Cera requested for polistas or townspeople to render the construction of the church. The request was granted and they were only given free food, equivalent to their compensation. In 1813, religious activities were held temporarily at the old chapel. In 1816, the church's roof was completed and painting of walls began. With the cooperation of all 300 families in the city, the stone church was finished in 1819. It resembles solemn simplicity – truly an Earthquake Baroque architectural style.

=== Newly-constructed stone church ===
The church had three naves, a dome, side altars with Romanesque-styled tables, crypt stones each with a replica of the Nuestra Señora dela Consolacion on one side and Saint Augustine on the other, a baptistry with a stone altar, and two sacristies with two wall closets each and a table with six drawers in one, and a tower with three posts topped by a spire. An antique statue of Saint Joseph and life-size statue of the dead Christ, bought from San Dionisio, Parañaque in the amount of 2 dozen (24pcs) eggs, were also among the first religious objects owned by the parish.

==== 1829 Earthquakes ====
The stone church and the parochial house was destroyed by three earthquakes on January 18, July 29, and September 30, 1829. Don Jose Rueda, former Gobernadorcillo (1925) of the town of Las Piñas concisely described the damages wrought to the church. According to him, the two arches were cracked, two naves and walls were destroyed, and the whole roof of the church including its cross beams and its dome were ruined. All the wooden structures inside the church were left standing in the midst of the rain.

=== Restoration efforts ===
Cera did not only solidify his name in building the stone church, but also in terms of architectural restoration. According to the remarks of Jose Sequi, Archbishop of Manila, after visiting Las Piñas Church on October 29, 1831, he was amazed by the restoration works. He expressed thus: "After I have seen the beautiful church of this place which was the work of the parish priest and also the very delicate adornments done in spite of the poverty of the town, and for his (Cera's) effort to procure the best for his church even without the help he needed, the Holy Mother Church is rendering unto him the utmost gratitude and concern."

=== Second restoration ===
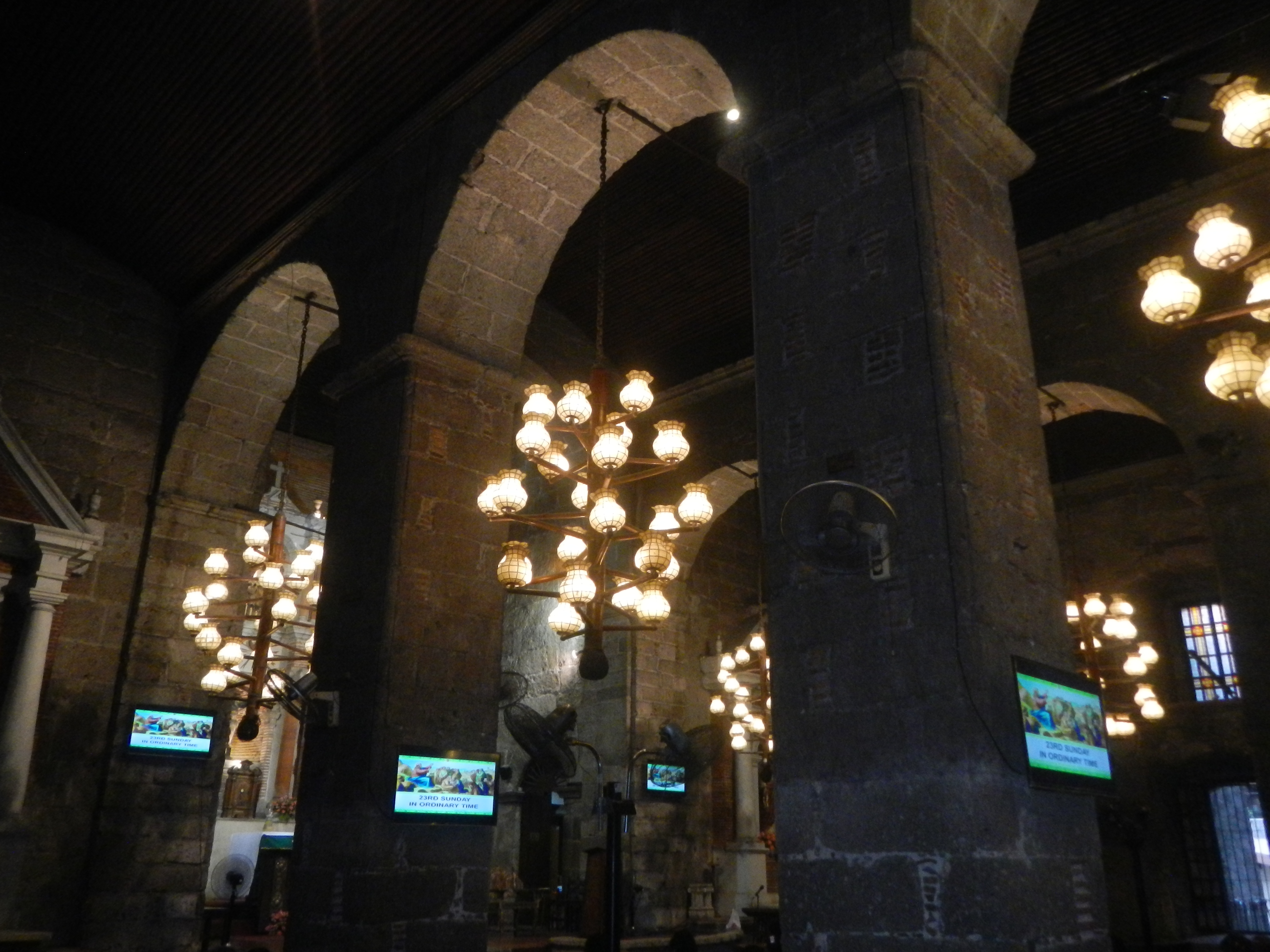
Capiz shell chandeliers hang under the arcades

Between 1971 and 1975, the church was restored by Francisco Mañosa and Partners, with architect Ludwig Alvarez, through the administration of Mark Lesage, to bring back the 19th-century look of the church and to re-position the main altar to face the people, as required by the new ecumenical church guidelines. The assessment revealed that the Las Piñas Church was in a depressing state due to:

- Heavily plastered walls,
- Aquamarine wall paint finish, and
- Few fluorescent tubes hanging from the ceiling

The repair works were conducted such as removal of plaster, ranging from 3 to 4 inches thick, and removal of debris. A 9-inch clay pot was discovered during the course of repair works in the church. It was believed to be as old as the church and even contained pieces of gold which enabled Lesage to continue the restoration works. The walls and the Bamboo Organ were the remaining parts of the original church. The original thatch roof was burned twice, thus, replaced with galvanized sheets. The major portion of the restoration of the exterior walls was cleaned to reveal the original walls. Missing stones were replaced with similar stones to limit the use of cement. Carved stones were provided by the high school students of St. Joseph Academy, as a part of their school project. Retablos, which accentuates the main altar, came from the Vatina – a store in Makati. All silver items, or retablos, were eventually donated by the owner of Vatina – after she attended a thanksgiving mass of the church. The original baptismal font, hewn out of stones, were discovered buried in the courtyard of the church. This was cleaned by Eduardo Castrillo, a notable sculptor. He also added a brass basin sculpture as his additional contribution.

On December 3, 1972, the newly restored church was inaugurated. The original framework were retained – complementary additions were executed. It features capiz chandeliers, aged bricks, old statues, bamboo ceiling, a choir loft with antique balustrades of carved wood and potted native palms.

The event coincided with the return of the Las Piñas Bamboo Organ on March 13, 1975, after three years of rehabilitation in Bonn, Germany, reviving the organ back to its original state.

On May 9, 1975, the bamboo organ made its inaugural concert at the newly renovated church and surrounding buildings.

== Establishment of St. Joseph's Academy ==
In 1914, Belgian missionaries Jose van Runenkelen and Victor Zaiel of Congregatio Immaculati Cordis Mariae (CICM) established St. Joseph's School next to the church to foster literacy in the parish community. The school, which started as a grade school, eventually included secondary education and was renamed as St. Joseph's Academy.

== Recognition ==
=== Historical markers ===
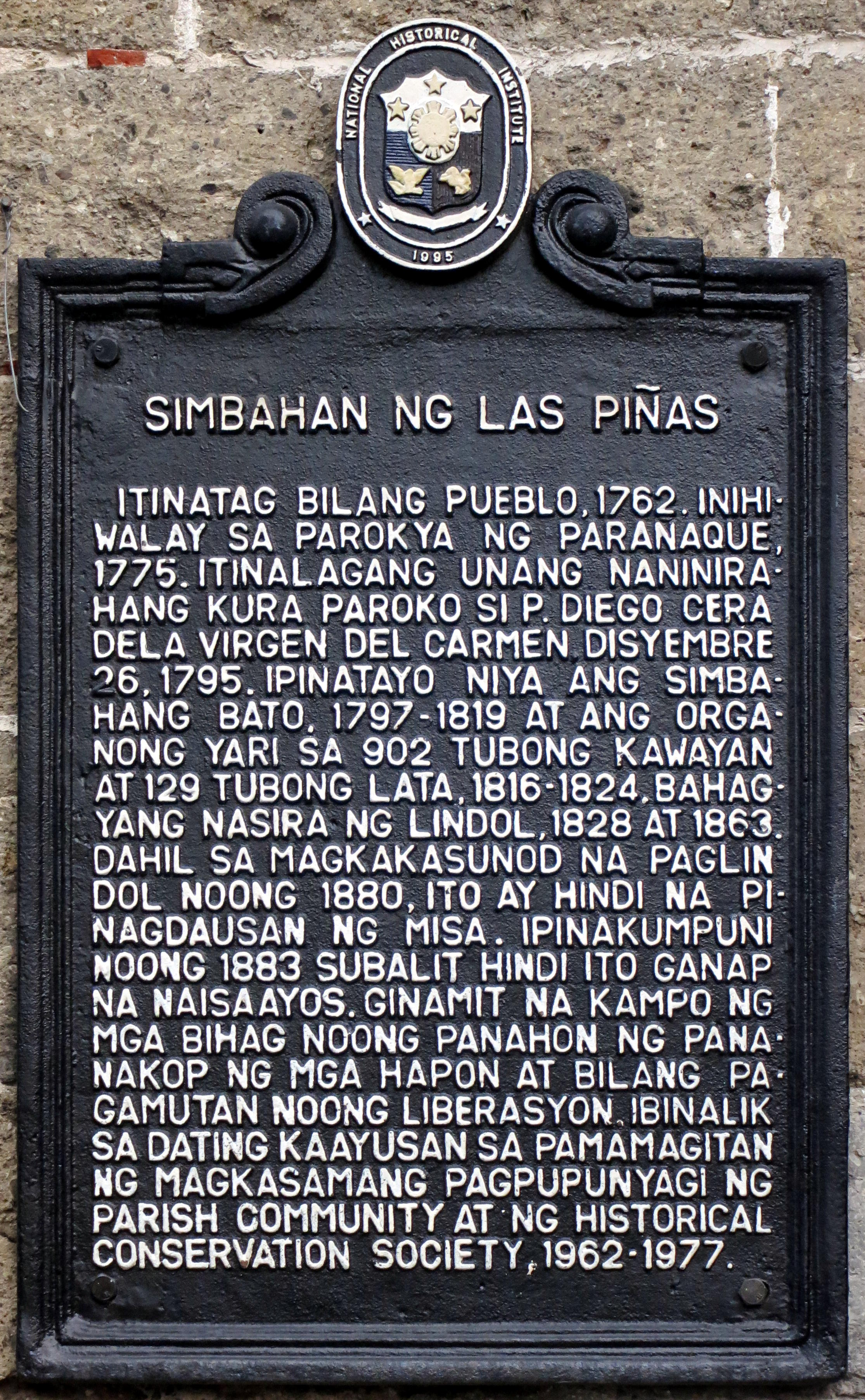
Church NHI historical marker installed in 1995

The Las Piñas Church was designated as Historic Structure by the National Historical Commission of the Philippines with the placing of a historical marker in 1995.

On July 15, 2013, the Las Piñas Church was declared as a Historic Landmark by National Historical Institute.

Simbahan ng Parokya ng San Jose, Las Piñas
IPINAHAYAG BILANG PAMBANSANG PALATANDAANG PANGKASAYSAYAN SA BISA NG RESOLUSYON BLG. 08 NG PAMBANSANG KOMISYONG PANGKASAYSAYAN NG PILIPINAS, 15 HULYO 2013.

== Pastors ==
Below is the list of parish priests who served St. Joseph Church since the 1950s.

Name	Years of Pastorship	Present Assignment
Camilo Feys	1958 to 1969	
Mark Lesage	1969 to 1999	Retired
Allen Aganon	1999 to 2004	Parish priest and rector, San Isidro Labrador Parish, Almanza Uno, Las Piñas
Albert Venus	2004 to 2011	Deceased
Mario Josefino Martinez	2011–2017	Parish priest of Our Lady of Unity Parish, 9th St., UPS-V, Sucat, Parañaque City
August Pulido	2017–2020	Rector and parish priest of the Cathedral Parish of St. Andrew, La Huerta, Parañaque City
Roberto A. Olaguer	2020–present	

Ezekiel Moreno used to be the parish priest of the church during his Philippine mission.

== Significant church properties ==
Statue of Padre Diego Cera by Napoleon Abueva

- The local parish houses the world-renowned Bamboo Organ.
- A statue of its first parish priest, Diego Cera de la Virgen del Carmen, can be found a few meters in front of its belfry. The statue was a commissioned work of National Artist for Sculpture, Napoleon Abueva. It was inaugurated on July 27, 1995, coinciding with the church's 200th founding anniversary.
- An inscription in an old church bell of Las Piñas Church stating – "Siendo Cura-del Pueblo de Las Peñas el M.R.P. Padre Diego Cera se Fundio este equilon ano de 1820". During the time of Diego Cera, the name of the town was "Las Peñas" until it was changed to "Las Piñas".

== Gallery ==
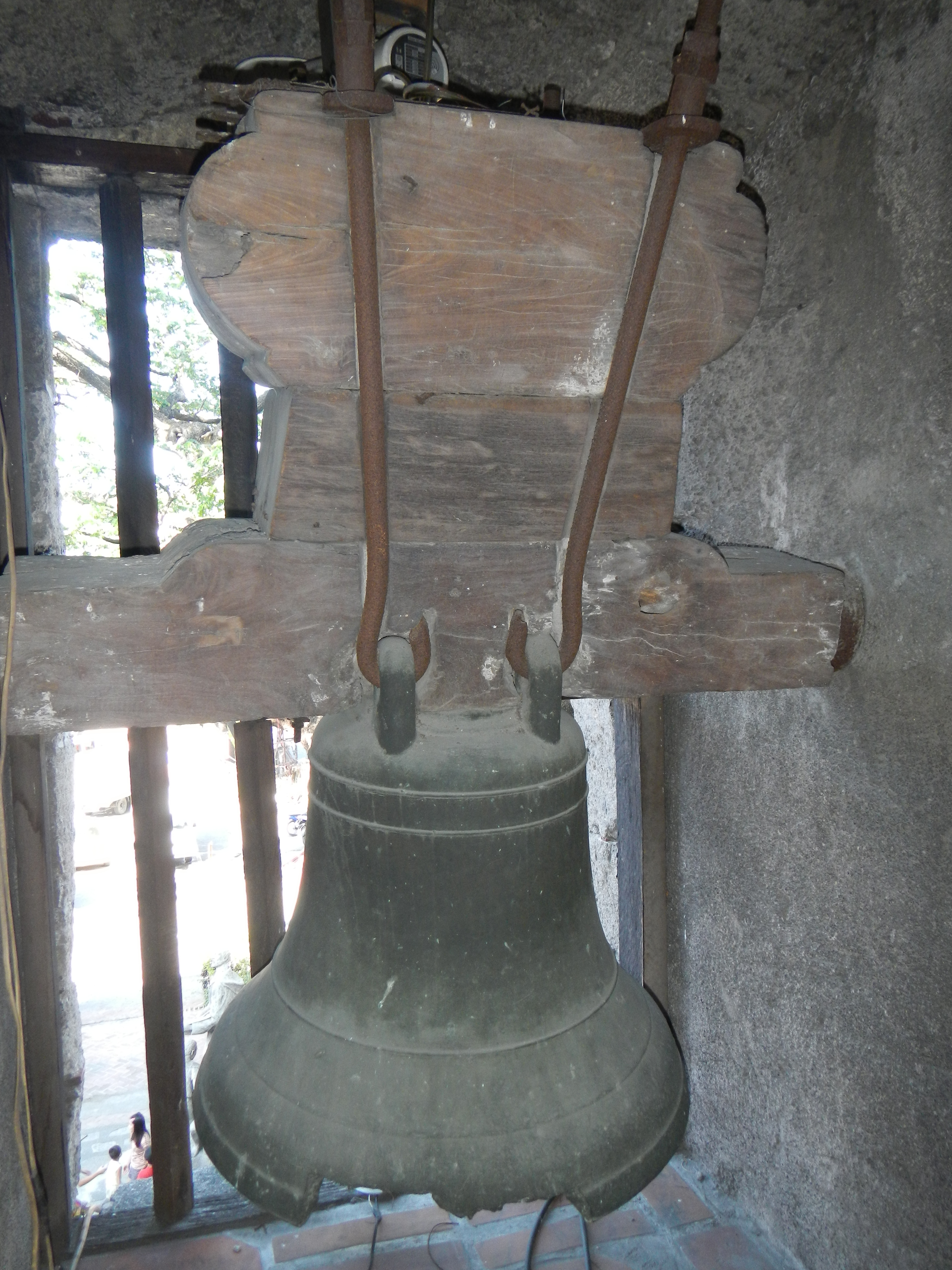
Las Piñas Bell that testifies to its township

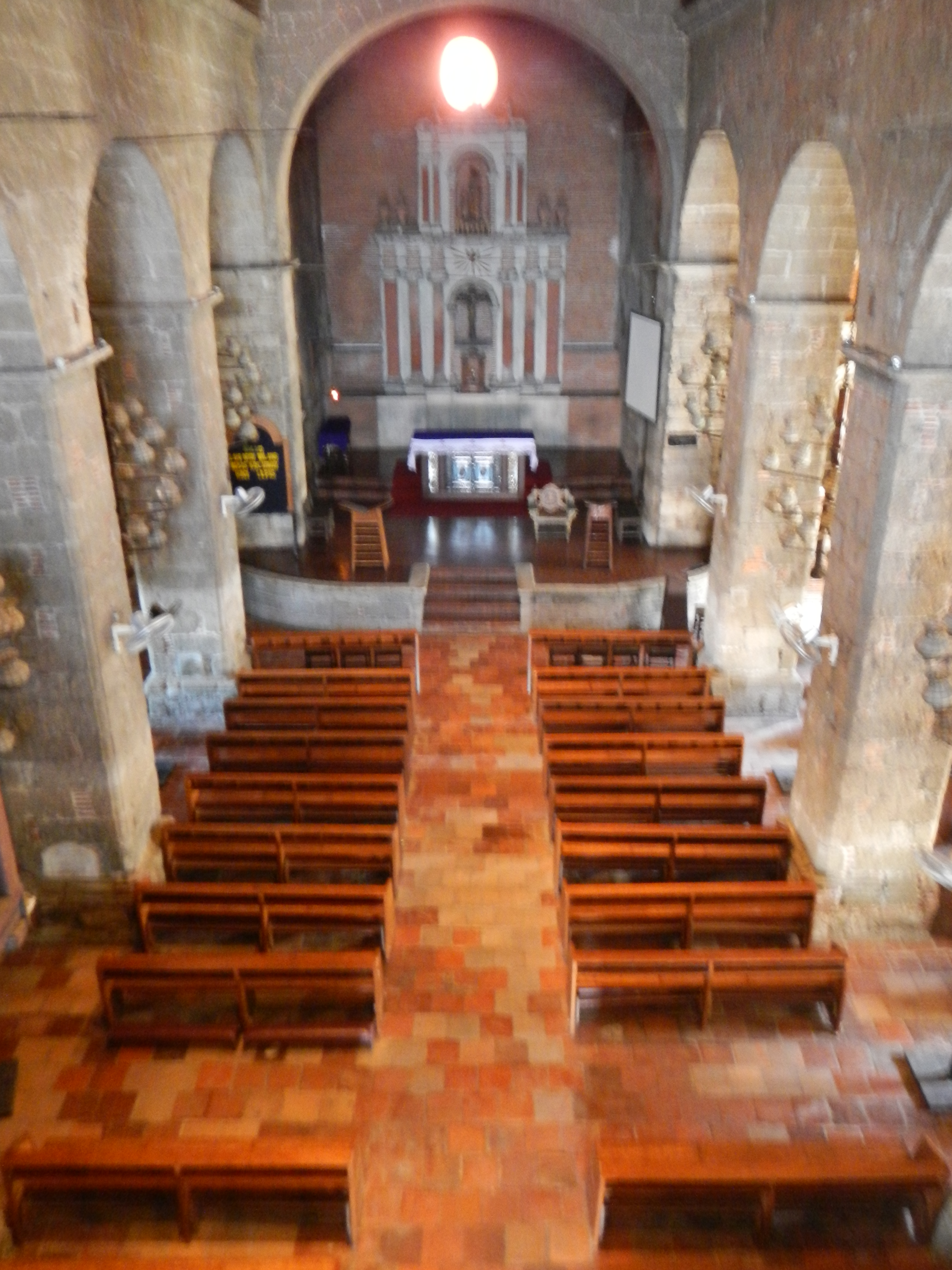
Church interior from above (2013)

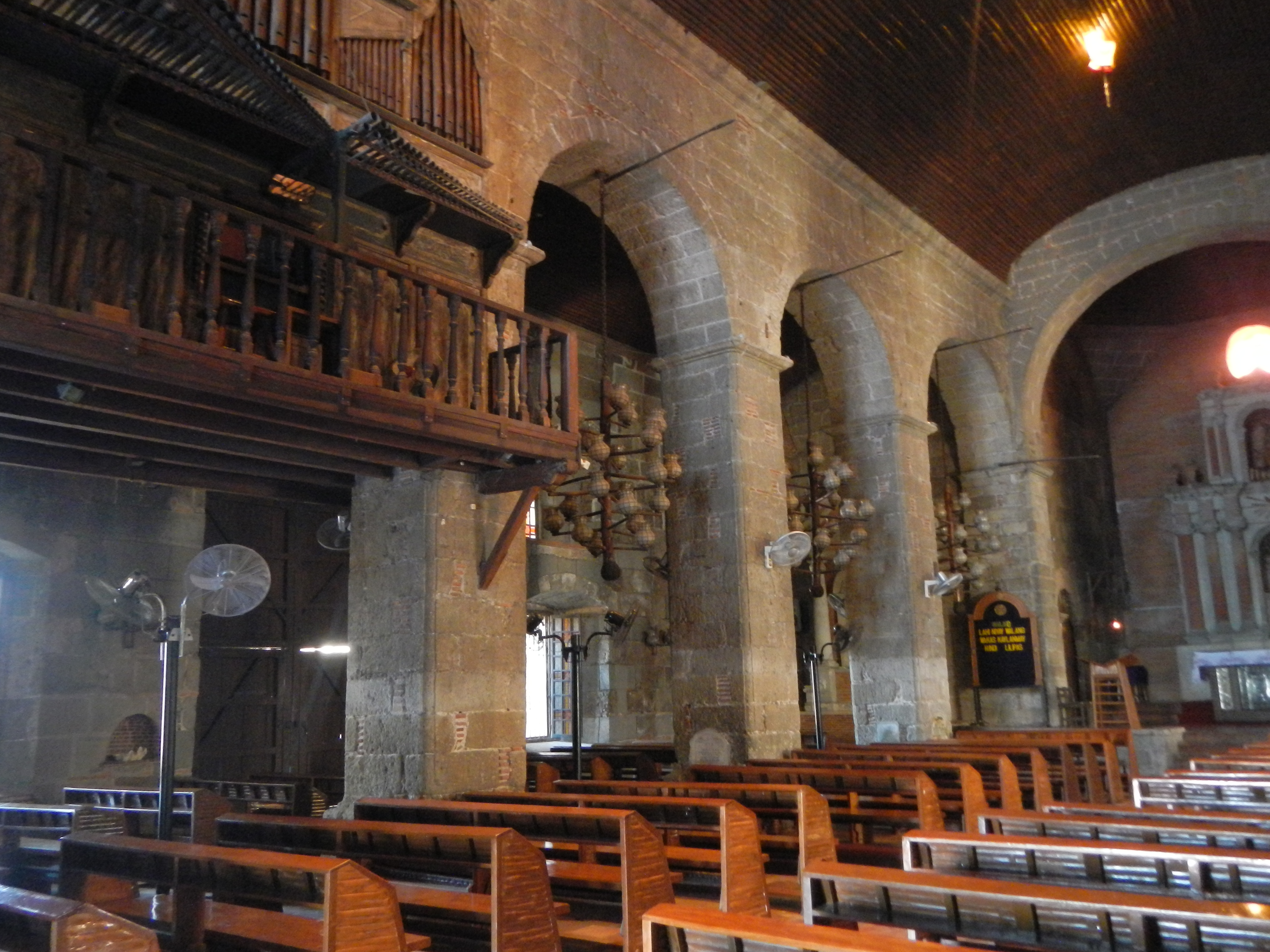
Bamboo Organ visible

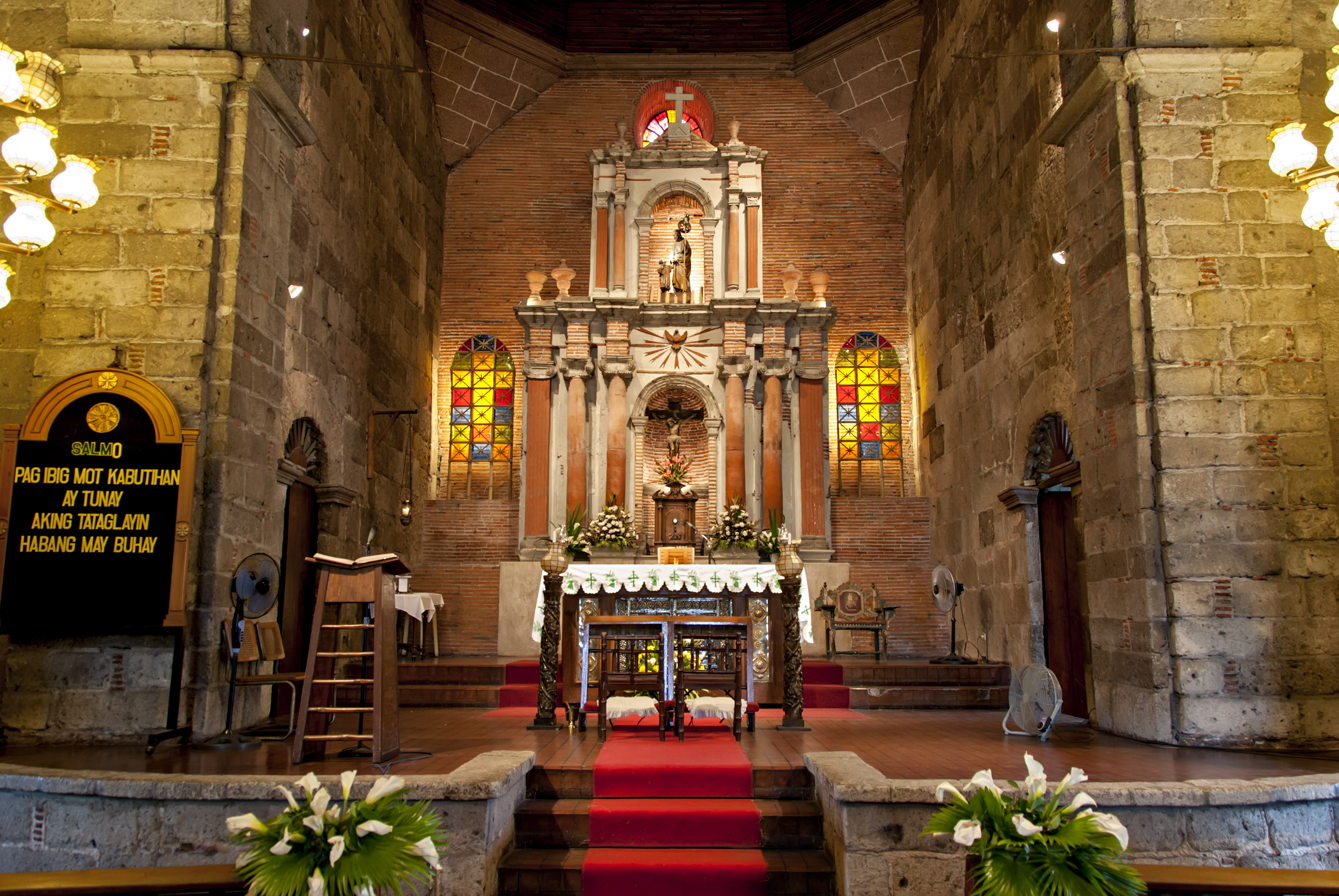
The high altar and reredos

== Other notable sites within the church area ==
- The Thanksgiving Tree marker in front of the belfry and the Thanksgiving Tree that shades the statue of Padre Diego Cera which was planted by M/Sgt. Prof. Daniel Mateo Fajardoto whom the barangay was named after.

== See also ==
- Las Piñas Boys Choir
