= Sitti =

Sitti Navarro
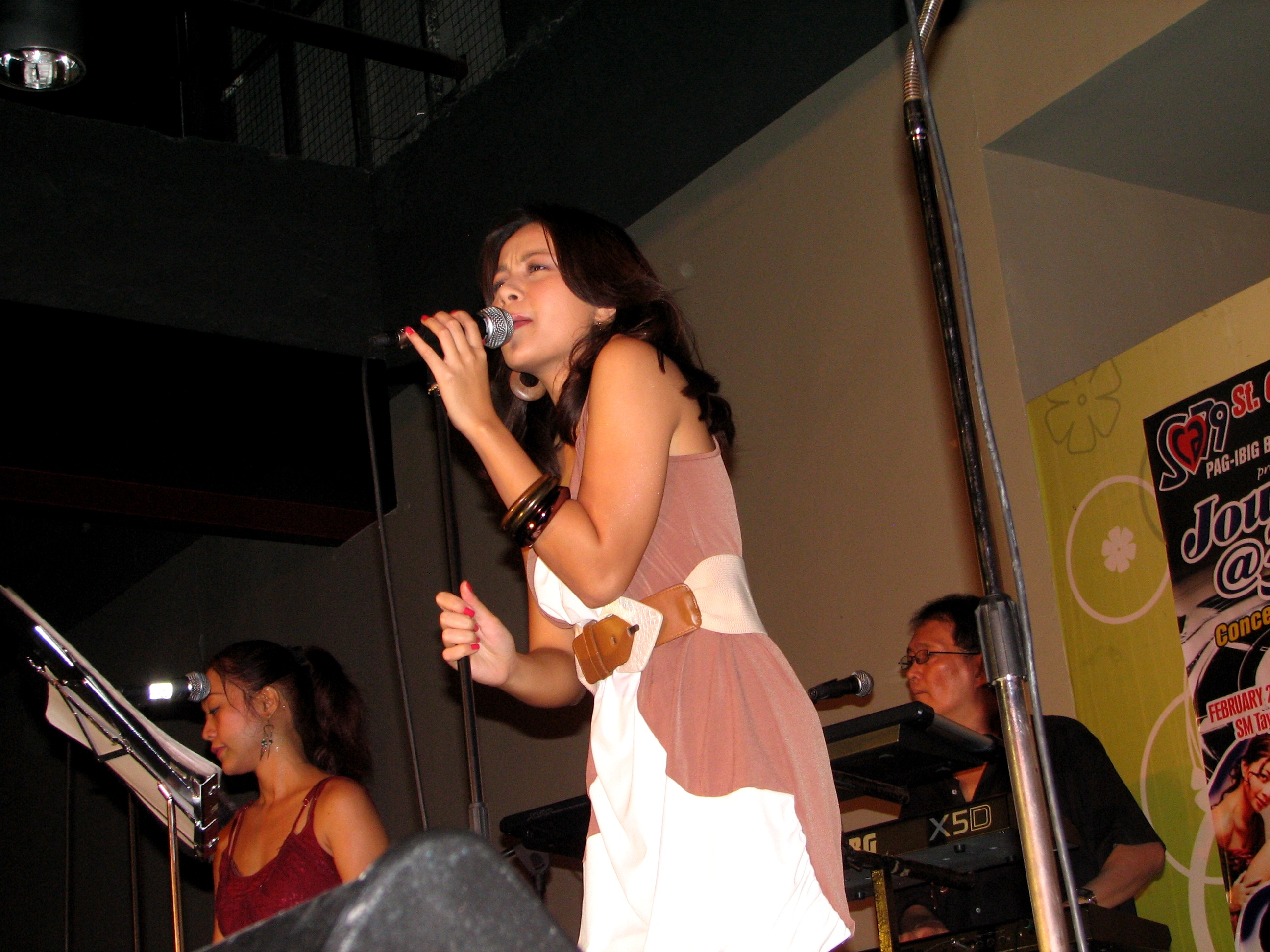
- Sitti performing at SM City Taytay in 2009

Background information
- Born: Sitti Katrina Baiddin Navarro; November 29, 1984 (age 41); Las Piñas, Metro Manila, Philippines
- Genres: Bossa nova; pinoy pop
- Occupations: Singer; actress
- Instruments: Vocals
- Years active: 2004–present
- Labels: Warner Music Philippines; MCA Music
- Spouse: Joey Ramirez (m. 2015)
- Website: www.bossagurl.com

Sitti Katrina Baiddin Navarro-Ramirez (/ˈsɪti/ SIH-tee; born November 29, 1984), known mononymously as Sitti, is a Filipino bossa nova singer. After releasing her first album, Café Bossa, in 2006, other bossa nova acts in the Philippines followed her. Sitti has regularly performed in the segment "A.S.A.P. Sessionistas" of the Sunday variety show ASAP since 2006.

== Early life ==
Sitti Katrina Baiddin Navarro was born on November 29, 1984 to lawyer Rolando Navarro and Lydia Baiddin, in Las Piñas, Philippines. Sitti is of Sama and Tausūg descent. She identifies herself as being Jama Mapun (Sama Kagayan), one of the Sama-Bajau subgroups in Tawi-Tawi. She graduated from the University of the Philippines Diliman in April 2005 with a degree in Business Economics and was a dean's lister at said university. In high school, she was editor-in-chief of the school paper and graduated as valedictorian of her class at Saint Francis of Assisi College, Las Piñas Campus.

In college, she was an active member of the AIESEC Local Committee where she was the Vice President for Outgoing Exchange from 2003 to 2004. She was also a member of the Organization of Business Economics Majors (OBEM) in UP Diliman.

Sitti has won two beauty pageant awards: the title of Miss Visayas 2001 in the Miss Travel Girl Pageant, and the first runner-up in the search for "Miss Silka" where she was also named Miss Friendship and Best in Swimwear.

== Musical career ==
Sitti has been performing since the age of 16. In 2004, MTV Philippines started MTV Supahstar: D' Super Search, where Sitti was one of the winners. She also appeared in the group's music videos. It led to her recording contract.

Her debut album, Café Bossa, was released in 2006. Four songs have been released': "Tattooed on My Mind", a remake of the D'Sound hit; "Hey Look at the Sun", "I Didn't Know I Was Looking for Love", and "Para sa Akin". A live album, Sitti Live!, was released in late 2006, and Café Bossa was re-released with a VCD in 2007.

Sitti collaborated with Club Myx to release Sitti in the Mix - The Dense Modesto Remixes, a collection of songs from Café Bossa that were made into dance-electronica songs with the help of DJ Dense Modesto, in mid-2007, before the release of her second album My Bossa Nova, which focuses on more recent songs. My Bossa Nova was re-released in mid-2008 with a VCD of Sitti Live! 2 called My Bossa Nova Live! and is now a certified Platinum album at the moment.

In 2008, Sitti released her first Christmas album, Ngayong Pasko. Unlike her past albums, this album is purely a cover versions album with only one original song, the carrier single and title of the album, Ngayong Pasko. This album also has reached the Gold status in less than a month after its release.

Sitti collaborated with singer Christian Bautista for his album Captured for a duet of the song of the same title. They once again collaborated for Sitti's Christmas album on the song "Baby It's Cold Outside".

In 2009, Sitti released her third studio album entitled "Contagious", which contains an original which was also the carrier single, "Is This Love", co-penned by Andrew Fromm, who also penned Christian Bautista's hit song, "The Way You Look at Me".

On March 8, 2012, she released her fifth studio album, Sessions, which spawned two singles; "Sino'ng Mag-aakala" and "Wag Mo Na Munang Sabihin". The album allowed her to experiment with other genres apart from bossa nova.

In the first Tokyo-Manila Jazz and Arts Festival, Sitti announced that her record label's Japanese branch will release one of her albums there, and that the label will decide on its release date. The album, released in May 2012 on iTunes and in October 2012 on stores, entitled Bossa Covers.

In 2013, she participated in the Philippines' highly esteemed Elements National Music Camp, where she was mentored by the likes of Ryan Cayabyab, Joey Ayala, and Gary Granada.

On June 25, 2013, it was announced that she will be entering the second Philippine Popular Music Festival as an interpreter with Julianne Tarroja for the song called "Pansamantagal" written by Jungee Marcelo.

== Television work ==
Sitti was also co-host of Pinoy Big Brother Season 2 on Studio 23, alongside Asia Agcaoili, ending with the victory of Beatriz Saw.

She ventured into acting in Judy Ann Santos' primetime teleserye, Ysabella, where she portrayed Tere, an aspiring lounge singer. Sitti was featured in ABS-CBN's Your Song, where her song "Ikaw Lamang" was the single for the episode she acted in with Sam Milby.

She also had a few hosting stints in Studio 23 such as Pinoy Dream Academy and Travel Time.

Sitti is currently a semi-regular on ABS-CBN's top-rating Sunday variety show, ASAP '09. She appears on a segment called ASAP Sessionistas together with MYMP, Aiza Seguerra, Nina, Richard Poon and Duncan Ramos.

== Stage acting ==
Sitti was part of Katy! The Musical which was staged on December 27, 2008 at Harbor Garden Tent Sofitel Philippine Plaza Manila wherein she played as Mary Walter. Alongside her was KC Concepcion, Jericho Rosales, Mitch Valdez, Dulce, Eugene Villaluz, Rachel Alejandro, Bituin Escalante, Jonalyn Viray, Aicelle Santos, Maricris Garcia, Frenchie Dy, Gian Magdangal, Gab Valenciano and Jennylyn Mercado.

In 2009, Sitti played the role of "Martha" in the Philippine staging of the Tony Award-winning, 19th century stage drama Spring Awakening from Atlantis Productions. Spring Awakening was directed by Chari Arespacochaga and features the set design of Tuxqs Rutaquio, choreography by Dexter Santos, costume design by Rajo Laurel, lights design by Voltaire de Jesus and musical direction by Jojo Malferari.

== Personal life ==
She is married to Joey Ramirez and has two daughters. She is a practicing Christian.

== Discography ==
=== Albums ===
==== Studio albums ====
Year	Album details	Certifications (sales thresholds)
2006	Café Bossa: Released: January 25, 2006; Label: Warner Music Philippines; Format: CD, digital download, streaming	PHI: 2× Platinum
2007	My Bossa Nova: Released: August 24, 2007; Label: Warner Music Philippines; Format: CD, digital download, streaming	PHI: Gold
2008	Ngayong Pasko: Released: October 30, 2008; Label: Warner Music Philippines; Format: CD, digital download, streaming	PHI: Platinum
2009	Contagious: Released: June 26, 2009; Label: Warner Music Philippines; Format: CD, digital download, streaming	
2011	Sessions: Released: March 4, 2011; Label: Warner Music Philippines; Format: CD, digital download, streaming	
2012	Bossa Covers: Released: 2012; Label: Warner Music Philippines; Format: CD, digital download, streaming	
2014	Bossa Love: Released: January 18, 2014; Label: MCA Music; Format: CD, digital download, streaming	

==== Live albums ====
Year	Album details	Certifications
2006	Sitti Live!: Released: September 15, 2006; Label: Warner Music Philippines; Format: CD, digital download, streaming	PHI: Gold
2008	My Bossa Nova Live!: Released: 2008; Label: Warner Music Philippines; Format: CD, digital download, streaming	PHI: Platinum

==== Remix albums ====
Year	Album details
2007	Sitti in the Mix: The Dense Modesto Remixes: Released: 2007; Label: Warner Music Philippines, Club Myx; Format: CD, digital download, streaming

=== Singles ===
- "Para sa Akin" (2006) (also covered by Jason Dhakal)

== Filmography ==
Year	Title	Role	Notes
2006–present	ASAP	Herself	Host / performer
2006	Pinoy Dream Academy (season 1)	Herself	Studio 23 host
2007	Pinoy Big Brother (season 2)	Herself	Studio 23 host
2007	Ysabella	Tere	Recurring role
2009	Squalor	Doctor	Indie film
2010	Showtime	Herself	Guest judge
2012	Angelito: Ang Bagong Yugto	Susan Samaniego	Special Guest
2016	Unang Hirit	Herself	Guest Performer

== Awards ==
Year	Award giving body	Category	Nominated work	Results
2006	MTV Pilipinas Music Awards	Favorite New Artist in a Video	"Para Sa Akin"	Won
2007	MYX Music Awards	Favorite Female Artist	—N/a	Nominated
2008	GMMSF Box-Office Entertainment Awards	Female Recording Artist of the Year	—N/a	Won
