= Sitti Live! =

Live album by Sitti Navarro
- Released: 2006
- Recorded: 2006
- Genre: Latin
- Length: 69:30
- Label: Warner Music Philippines
- Producer: Jim Baluyut (executive), Neil C. Gregorio (album)

Sitti Navarro chronology
Café Bossa (2006)	Sitti Live! (2006)	Sitti in the Mix - The Dense Modesto Remixes (2007)

Sitti Live! is a live album by Filipino singer Sitti. It was released by Warner Music Philippines on September 15, 2006. The concert was recorded live at the Ortigas Park in Pasig, Metro Manila.

== Track listing ==
1. One Note Samba (running time 2:08)
2. Wave (3:03)
3. Samba Song (2:47)
4. Água de Beber (4:09)
5. Birimbao (4:12)
6. Fever (5:26)
7. Para sa Akin (3:16)
  - Literal English translation of title: "For Me"
8. Tattooed on My Mind (4:21)
9. Hey Look at the Sun (4:26)
10. I Didn't Know I Was Looking For Love (4:13)
11. Waters of March (4:16)
12. Ikaw Pa Rin (3:59)
  - Literal English translation of title: "Still You"
13. For Your Eyes Only (3:34)
14. Voçe Abuso (3:10)
15. Lança Perfume (3:24)
16. País Tropical (5:08)
17. Mas que Nada – 8:36
18. Just the Two of Us – 3:19

== Personnel ==
- Sitti Navarro - vocals
- Erskine Basilio - nylon guitar
- Jerome Rico - guitar on "One Note Samba"
- Steven Mora - drums
- Lakshmi Ramirez - double bass
- Audrey Cruz - percussion
- Archie Lacorte - saxophone
- Mark Laccay - recording of the album
- Dante Tanedo - mixing
- Frey Zambrano - production coordinator
- Rey Cortez - album cover layout
- Kristine Soguilon - photography
- Mari Arquiza - photography
- Jim Baluyut - executive production
- Neil Gregorio - album production, A&R, mastering and sequencing
