= Sitti in the Mix: The Dense Modesto Remixes =

Remix album by Sitti Navarro and DJ Dense Modesto
- Released: 2007
- Recorded: 2006
- Genre: Dance
- Length: 50:16
- Label: Warner Music Philippines, Club Myx
- Producer: Jim Baluyut

Sitti Navarro chronology
Sitti Live! (2006)	Sitti in the Mix: The Dense Modesto Remixes (2007)	My Bossa Nova (2007)

Dense Modesto chronology
Sitti in the Mix: The Dense Modesto Remixes (2007)	Nina in the Mix: The Dense Modesto Remixes (2007)

Sitti in the Mix: The Dense Modesto Remixes is the first remix album of Filipino bossa nova singer Sitti, and the first by DJ Dense Modesto. It was released in the Philippines in 2007 by Club Myx, in collaboration with Warner Music Philippines. Instead of a bossa nova sound, Sitti collaborated with Myx Philippines DJ Dense Modesto to make her songs into dance tracks.

== Track listing ==
1. "Intro: Ipanema Drums" (Moraes, Gimbel, Jobim) – 0:28
2. "Mas Que Nada" (Baile Del Sol Remix) (Jorge Ben) – 5:37
3. "I Didn't Know I Was Looking for Love" (Morning After Remix) (Tracey Thorn, Ben Watt) – 3:41
4. "Wave" (Blue Coast Remix) (Jobim) – 4:06
5. "Tattooed on My Mind" (Beach Avenue Remix) (D'Sound) – 7:13
6. "You on My Mind" (Modesto Beep Remix) (Connell, Drewery, O'Duffy) – 4:05
7. "Interlude: The Girl from Ipanema" (Fastrack 2030 Remix) - 1:33
8. "At 17" (Prom Night Remix) (Janis Ian) – 4:34
9. "Lady Wants to Know" (Trip Lounge Remix) (Michael Franks) – 3:18
10. "Interlude: One Note Samba" (Outtake Remix) (Hendricks, Jobim, Mendonca) – 1:15
11. "Para sa Akin" (Paso Dulce Remix) (Emil Pama) – 3:18
12. "Interlude: Para sa Akin" (Reprise) – 0:19
13. "Hey Look at the Sun" (Fieldday Remix) (Nelson Angelo) – 5:25
14. "Invisible War" (Empty Hallway Remix) (Julia Fordham) – 4:54
15. "Outro: Perfume Guitarra" - 0:30

== Personnel ==
- Sitti Navarro - vocals
- Dense Modesto - remix
