= My Bossa Nova =

Studio album by Sitti Navarro
- Released: September 28, 2007
- Recorded: 2007
- Genre: Bossa nova; jazz
- Length: 71:17
- Label: Warner Music Philippines
- Producer: Jim Baluyut; Neil Gregorio

Sitti Navarro chronology
Sitti in the Mix - The Dense Modesto Remixes (2007)	My Bossa Nova (2007)	My Bossa Nova Live! (2008)

My Bossa Nova is the second studio album by Filipina bossa nova singer, Sitti. It was released on September 28, 2007, under Warner Music Philippines. Unlike her previous studio album, Café Bossa, this album focused on more recent songs and had very few "traditional" bossa nova songs. Sitti also co-wrote one song, "A Song for Penny Brown".

"I'll Never Fall in Love Again" is incorrectly printed as the 1952 song "When I Fall in Love" (Edward Heyman and Victor Young) on the track listing and liner notes.

== Track listing ==
1. "Cross My Heart" (Tracey Thorn, Ben Watt) - 3:33
2. "Time and Tide" (Basia Trzetrzelewska, Danny White) - 3:59
3. "With or Without You" (U2) - 3:58
4. "My Ever Changing Moods" (Paul Weller) - 4:47
5. "Baby, I Love Your Way" (Peter Frampton) - 5:33
6. "2 Become 1" (Spice Girls, Matt Rowe, Richard Stannard) - 4:49
7. "Kung Di Rin Lang Ikaw" (Emil Pama, Warner Music Philippines) - 4:42
  - Literal English translation of title: "If It Wouldn't Be You"
8. "Hinahanap Hanap Kita" (Rico Blanco) - 4:07
  - Literal English translation of title: "Always Searching For You"
9. "Take a Bow" (Kenneth "Babyface" Edmonds, Madonna) - 4:25
10. "I Won't Stand in Your Way" (Brian Setzer) - 4:24
11. "Smooth Operator" (Sade Adu, Ray Saint John) - 3:17
12. "Puso'y Nagsasamba" (Flora Joy Tiu-Suaboksan, Chito Servañez, Warner Music Philippines) - 3:13
  - Literal English translation of title: "My Heart Is Dancing the Samba"
13. "If You Leave Me Now" (Peter Cetera) - 4:03
14. "I'll Never Fall in Love Again" (Burt Bacharach, Hal David) - 2:30
15. "Ikaw Lamang" (Jesus Jodloman, Jr., Warner Music Philippines) - 3:39
  - Literal English translation of title: "Only You"
16. "I Need to Be in Love" (Richard Carpenter, John Bettis, Albert Hammond) - 3:04
17. "A Song for Penny Brown" (Sitti Navarro, Warner Music Philippines) - 3:47
18. "The Look of Love" (Burt Bacharach, Hal David) - 3:27

== Personnel ==
- Sitti Navarro - vocals
- Chito Servañez - piano
- Erskine Basilio - acoustic guitar
- Steven Mora - drums
- Jigs Lacap - percussion
- Lakshmi Ramirez - double bass
- Archie Lacorte - saxophone
