= Karen Ramirez =

British singer

Karen Ramirez (born 21 November 1971 in North London) is a British female dance music singer. At the age of six, Ramirez moved to Trinidad and Tobago and lived there for some time, before returning to London and entering university. In 1998, she had a No. 1 hit single on the U.S. Hot Dance Club Play chart and a No. 8 hit on the UK Singles Chart with her cover version of Everything but the Girl's "I Didn't Know I Was Looking for Love," under the simpler title of "Looking for Love."

Her second album, Bees in the Trees, was released exclusively on iTunes in May 2006.

== Discography ==
=== Studio albums ===
- Distant Dreams (20 July 1998), Manifesto - UK #45
- Distant Dreams (Japan release) (1998), Manifesto/Mercury (three extra tracks: two versions of "Troubled Girl", the Spanish version and the Boris Dlugosch & Michael Lange elusive club mix, and "Fever")
- Bees in the Trees (May 2006), self-released

=== Remix albums ===
- Remixed Dreams (Japan only) (13 January 1999), Mercury

=== Singles ===
Title	Year	Peak chart positions			Album
Title	Year	UK	AUS	IRL	Album
"Troubled Girl"	1998	50	—	—	Distant Dreams
"Looking for Love"	1998	8	47	23	Distant Dreams
"If We Try"	1998	23	—	—	Distant Dreams
"Lies"	1999	—	—	—	Distant Dreams

== See also ==
- List of number-one dance hits (United States)
- List of artists who reached number one on the US Dance chart
