= Luther Point Bible Camp =

Christian Bible camp in Grantsburg, Wisconsin, U.S.

Coordinates: 45°44′07.7″N 92°34′28.5″W

Luther Point Bible Camp (LPBC)
- Formation: 1946
- Location: Grantsburg, Wisconsin

Luther Point Bible Camp is an ELCA affiliated Christian Bible camp located in Northwestern Wisconsin. Youth and young adults have the opportunity to come and be a part of the outdoor ministry that Luther Point offers year-round, along with approximately 45 summer staff, 5-10 full-time year-round staff, and many volunteers. Luther Point sits on a peninsula surrounded on three sides by the water of Wood Lake as well as meadows and woods on land.

== History ==
Luther Point Bible Camp was born in the 1930s, by the shared vision of two men, Arvid Larson and Ed Dahlberg. Over the course of ten years they gathered support, land, and a concrete identity, and in 1946 the camp was officially christened under the Lutheran Bible Camp Association. By 1947, the first cabins had been built. The first campers attended Luther Point the summer of 1949, and over the course of the next several years, the dining hall, chapel, and staff accommodation facility were built. The staff accommodation building was later transformed into a retreat center for year-round retreats. They have continued to build more facilities for campers, staff, and retreaters to use during the summer camp season and the off season. In 1970, the directors began hiring paid staff to work for the summer, instead of calling volunteer counselors. The camp has seen a total of 5 directors thus far, the most recent being Rev. Craig Corbin, who resigned in 2013.

== Programs ==
During the summer there are week-long camps for Elementary and Junior High students, as well as service opportunities for high school students- the B.U.D.D.I.E.S. program allows high schoolers to come to camp for free for two weeks and act as "counselors in training". There are weeks of Horse Camp, Guitar Camp, Fine Arts Camp, Drama Camp, Kayak and Canoe Trips, Grandparent/Grandchild Camp, and Luther Point even sends staff to area churches to run Vacation Bible School (VBS) programs on site. During the "off season", there are many retreat opportunities as well. Staff will host weekend camps for Elementary, Junior High, and High Schoolers, as well as some church run retreats. LPBC also plans some weekends around the holidays for cookie baking and quilting groups.
