= Ngayong Pasko =

Studio album by Sitti
- Released: October 6, 2008
- Genre: Christmas
- Label: Warner Music Philippines

Sitti chronology
| My Bossa Nova Live! (2008) | Ngayong Pasko (2008) | Contagious (2009) |

Singles from Ngayong Pasko
- 1. "Ngayong Pasko" Released: 2008

Ngayong Pasko (transl. "This Christmas") is the third studio album by Filipino bossa nova singer Sitti. It was released by Warner Music Philippines on October 6, 2008. It contains one original song, the Tagalog-language "Ngayong Pasko", which was released as the album's lead single.

== Tracklist ==
| No. | Title | Writer(s) | Length |
|---|---|---|---|
| 1. | "All I Want for Christmas Is You" | Mariah Carey; Walter Afanasieff | 3:39 |
| 2. | "Ngayong Pasko" | Lambert Reyes | 3:59 |
| 3. | "Santa Baby" | Joan Javits; Philip Springer; Tony Springer | 2:59 |
| 4. | "Baby, It's Cold Outside" (duet with Christian Bautista) | Frank Loesser | 5:01 |
| 5. | "Winter Wonderland" | Richard Bernhard Smith; Felix Bernard | 2:32 |
| 6. | "Someday at Christmas" | Ron Miller; Bryan Wells | 3:15 |
| 7. | "Have Yourself a Merry Little Christmas" | Ralph Blane; Hugh Martin | 3:02 |
| 8. | "I Saw Mommy Kissing Santa Claus" | Tommie Connor | 2:46 |
| 9. | "I'll Be Home for Christmas" (featuring the Las Piñas Boys Choir) | Kim Gannon; Walter Kent | 3:42 |
| 10. | "My Grown-Up Christmas List" | David Foster; Linda Thompson Foster; Amy Grant | 4:28 |
| 11. | "The Christmas Song" | Robert Wells; Mel Tormé | 4:12 |
| 12. | "Jingle Bell Rock" | Joe Beal; Jim Boothe | 2:16 |
| 13. | "Boogie Woogie Santa Claus" | Leon René | 1:44 |
