= Café Bossa =

Studio album by Sitti
- Released: January 25, 2006
- Recorded: 2005
- Studio: Stone House Bar (Quezon City, Philippines)
- Genre: Bossa nova; jazz
- Length: 62:07
- Language: English; Tagalog; Portuguese
- Label: Warner Music Philippines
- Producer: Ricky R. Ilacad; Neil C. Gregorio

Sitti chronology
Café Bossa (2006)	Sitti Live! (2006)

Singles from Café Bossa
- 1. "Tattooed on My Mind" Released: November 16, 2005; 2. "Hey Look at the Sun" Released: February 4, 2006; 3. "I Didn't Know I Was Looking for Love" Released: March 27, 2006; 4. "Para sa Akin" Released: May 13, 2006

Café Bossa is the debut album by Filipino bossa nova singer Sitti. It was released in the Philippines on January 25, 2006 by Warner Music Philippines. The album spawned four successful singles—"Tattooed on My Mind", "Hey Look at the Sun", "I Didn't Know I Was Looking for Love" and "Para sa Akin". The album was certified double platinum by the Philippine Association of the Record Industry (PARI) on September 17, 2006, denoting over 60,000 units sold in the country.

A limited edition of the album was released in February 2007, containing a bonus video CD and a different cover. The video CD includes her official music videos from the album and her MTV Philippines' Sessions Live performance. It was also released on digital download through iTunes and Amazon.com.

== Track listing ==
All tracks were produced by Neil C. Gregorio.

Standard edition
No.	Title	Writer(s)	Length
1.	"Girl from Ipanema" (Portuguese/English)	Vinicius de Moraes; Norman Gimbel; Antonio Carlos Jobim	2:23
2.	"Tattooed on My Mind"	D'Sound	4:25
3.	"At 17"	Janis Ian	4:10
4.	"Hey Look at the Sun"	Nelson Angelo	3:13
5.	"I Didn't Know I Was Looking for Love"	Tracey Thorn; Ben Watt	3:54
6.	"Invisible War"	Julia Fordham	3:08
7.	"One Note Samba" (English)	Jon Hendricks; Jobim; Newton Mendonca	2:11
8.	"Soft Melody"	John Kaizan Neptune	3:48
9.	"You on My Mind"	Andy Connell; Corinne Drewery	3:17
10.	"Lost in Space"	Tunde Baiyewu	3:20
11.	"The Lady Wants to Know"	Michael Franks	4:23
12.	"Close to You - Half a Minute"	Burt Bacharach; Hal David	2:09
13.	"Samba Song"	Bong Pinera	3:14
14.	"Bridges"	Birth; Fernando Brant	5:21
15.	"Mas que Nada"	Jorge Ben	3:24
16.	"Wave"	Jobim	3:29
17.	"Fly Me to the Moon"	Bart Howard^{[a]}	3:12
18.	"Para sa Akin"	Emil Pama	3:09

Limited edition
No.	Title	Length
1.	"Para sa Akin" (music video)
2.	"Hey Look at the Sun" (music video)
3.	"I Didn't Know I Was Looking for Love" (music video)
4.	"EPK / Behind the Scenes"
5.	"Girl from Ipanema" (MTV Sessions Live)
6.	"Tattoed on My Mind" (MTV Sessions Live)
7.	"Samba Song" (MTV Sessions Live)
8.	"Para sa Akin" (MTV Sessions Live)
9.	"Mas que Nada" (MTV Sessions Live)

== Personnel ==
Credits were taken from Titik Pilipino.

Production

- Joseph De Vera - album cover art and design
- Neil C. Gregorio - album producer, A & R, sequencing
- Ricky R. Ilacad - executive producer, A & R
- Mark Laccay - studio recording
- Pazzy Marquez - styling and grooming
- Paolo Pineda - album photography
- Dante Tanedo - mixing
- Frey Zambrano - A & R, production coordinator

Musicians

- Erskine Basilio - acoustic guitar
- Marcy Estrella - percussions
- Archie Lacorte - saxophone, flute
- Sitti Navarro - lead vocals
- Jerome Rico - semi-hollow guitar (track 7)
- Vic San Juan - electric, upright bass
- Chito Servanez - piano, clavinova
- Sonny Teodoro - drums, additional percussions

Recording locations

- Stone House Bar (Quezon City, Philippines) - album recording
- Warner Chili Red Studio - sequencing

== Certifications ==
Country	Provider	Certification	Sales
Philippines	PARI	2× Platinum	60,000+

== Footnotes ==
a. Erroneously credited to Julie London, who recorded a well-known version of the song.
