= Armando Salarza =

Filipino musician

Armando V. Salarza is an internationally acclaimed concert organist, harpsichordist, conductor and the titular organist of the Bamboo Organ of Las Piñas City, Philippines. He is the ambassador of pipe organ music in the Philippines, in the local and international arena.

As a youngster, Salarza was a member of the Las Piñas Boys Choir. He obtained his undergraduate and postgraduate degrees in Austria, funded by a scholarship provided by the Las Piñas Bamboo Organ Foundation. As a world-renowned concert organist, Salarza has given performances in numerous countries. In 2003, Salarza became the conductor of the Las Piñas Boys Choir, leading the choir to a gold in the children's category of the 5th World Choir Game in Graz, Austria, in 2008. He has served as the artistic director of the International Bamboo Organ Festival and on the faculty of the University of the Philippines.

In 1987, he served as assistant conductor during the 1987 papal visit of Pope John Paul II to Australia, while in 2015, he played the Pels organ at the Manila Cathedral during the papal visit of Pope Francis.

== Early life and education ==
Salarza began playing the piano at age 7 and the organ two years later, giving his first public performance at the age of 11. When he was 14, he joined the Las Piñas Boys Choir.

Salarza studied at the University of Music and Performing Arts in Graz, Austria, on a scholarship provided by the Bamboo Organ Foundation. In Graz, he became an organ instructor for the diocese and other parishes in Carinthia province as part of the Institute for Church Music's outreach program. Salarza graduated in 1988 with a Master of Arts degree in church music with distinction, and a teacher's certificate.

Between 1988 and 1992, he carried out postgraduate studies in organ concert performance at the University of Music and Performing Arts in Vienna, Austria. Salarza also took classes in organ, harpsichord, orchestra and choral conducting at various institutions, including the University of Salamanca in Spain and Cambridge University in the United Kingdom, the latter on a scholarship given by the British Council.

Salarza studied under notable musicians and teachers including Dr. Johann Trummer, Gordon Murray, John Rutter, Guy Bovet, John Scott, and Harald Vogel.

== Career ==
=== Organ performances ===
In 1992, Salarza returned to the Philippines where he has given numerous concerts, including at the Cultural Center of the Philippines and the Philippine Philharmonic Orchestra. He also performed regularly at the annual International Bamboo Organ Festival in Las Piñas.

As a world renowned concert organist, Salarza has also given performances in numerous countries, including Austria, Germany, Belgium, Rome, Switzerland, Czech Republic, Poland, Finland and the United States.

He has also been invited to give the inaugural performances on many of the country's pipe organs, including those at the EDSA Shrine, Manila Cathedral, San Agustin Church, and others across the Philippines, as well as on the restored pipe organs of Basilica Minore del Sto. Niño de Cebu and St. John the Baptist of Jimenez in Misamis Occidental.

In January 2015, he played the Pels organ at the Manila Cathedral during the papal visit of Pope Francis.

=== Conductor and director ===
While studying in Austria, Salarza served as assistant conductor during the 1987 papal visit by Pope John Paul II.

In 2003, he became the conductor of the Las Piñas Boys Choir, of which he was a former member. Under his lead, the choir won gold in the children's category of the 5th World Choir Game in Graz, Austria, beating 54 other groups.

In 2010, Salarza was serving as the artistic director of the International Bamboo Organ Festival and on the faculty of the University of the Philippines College of Music, St. Scholastica's College of Music, and the Manila Cathedral – Basilica Institute of Liturgical Music. He also teaches private lessons, leads workshops and appears at schools nationwide.

As a conductor, Salarza is often sought as a judge for regional or national choral competitions or to teach children and adult choirs in other schools and parishes in the Philippines.

== Awards and recognition ==
Salarza was the youngest finalist in the National Music Competitions for Young Artists (NAMCYA) piano competition.

In 1986, he received a special recognition award (Würdigungspreis) from the Austrian federal Ministry of Science and Research. He was also given the title of Organiste Titulaire of the Bamboo Organ. In 1996, Salarza was presented with the Kawayan Award for Music Category by the Rotary Club of Las Piñas.

He has been featured in numerous newspapers, such as the Los Angeles Times and the Kingston Gleaner, as well as on numerous TV programs, such as Bravo Filipino and Channel News Asia's Yours Truly Asia.

== Discography ==
- Twenty Years: Bamboo Organ Festival featuring solo organ performances by Luigi Ferdinando Tagliavini, Armando Salarza and Wolfgang Oehms from the Bamboo Organ Foundation.
- Bach on the Bamboo Organ. Bamboo Organ Foundation (Released Feb. 1996).
- The Bamboo Organ & Brass, a Bamboo organ concert with brass instruments with Theo Mertens, Carlos Martens, Armando Salarza and Gerardo Fajardo, from Bamboo Music (Released Feb. 1999).
- Armando V. Salarza on the Historic Bamboo Organ, a CD compilation of performances from the International Bamboo Organ Festival (Released Nov. 2010).
