= Bamboo Organ =

19th-century church organ in the Philippines

Coordinates: 14.481109°N 120.981498°E

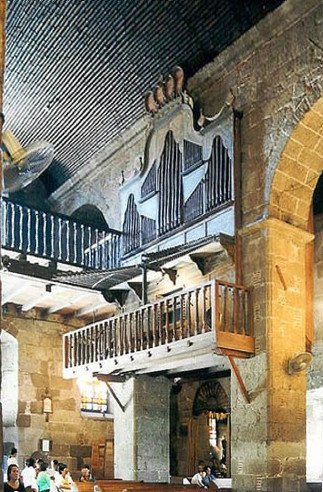
The Las Piñas Bamboo Organ

The Las Piñas Bamboo Organ in St. Joseph Parish Church in Las Piñas, Philippines, is a 19th-century church organ. It is known for its unique organ pipes; of its 1031 pipes, 902 are made of bamboo. It was completed after six years of work in 1824 by Father Diego Cera, the builder of the town's stone church and its first resident parish priest.

After age and numerous disasters had rendered the musical instrument unplayable for a long time, in 1972, the national government and the local community joined together to have the organ shipped to Germany for restoration. For its anticipated return in 1975, the home church of the bamboo organ and the surrounding buildings were restored to their 19th-century state by architect Francisco Mañosa and partner Ludwig Alvarez in time for its scheduled return. The annual International Bamboo Organ Festival, a festival of classical music, was started to celebrate the music of the reborn instrument and its unique sound.

Since 1992, Prof. Armando Salarza has been the titular organist of the Bamboo Organ. He is also the artistic director of the International Bamboo Organ Festival, now the longest-running annual international music festival held in the country.

Recognizing its cultural significance, the Bamboo Organ was declared a National Cultural Treasure of the Philippines in 2003. The St. Joseph Parish Church, featuring the renowned organ and an accompanying church museum in the old convent house, has become a favored destination for both Filipino and international tourists visiting Las Piñas.

== History ==
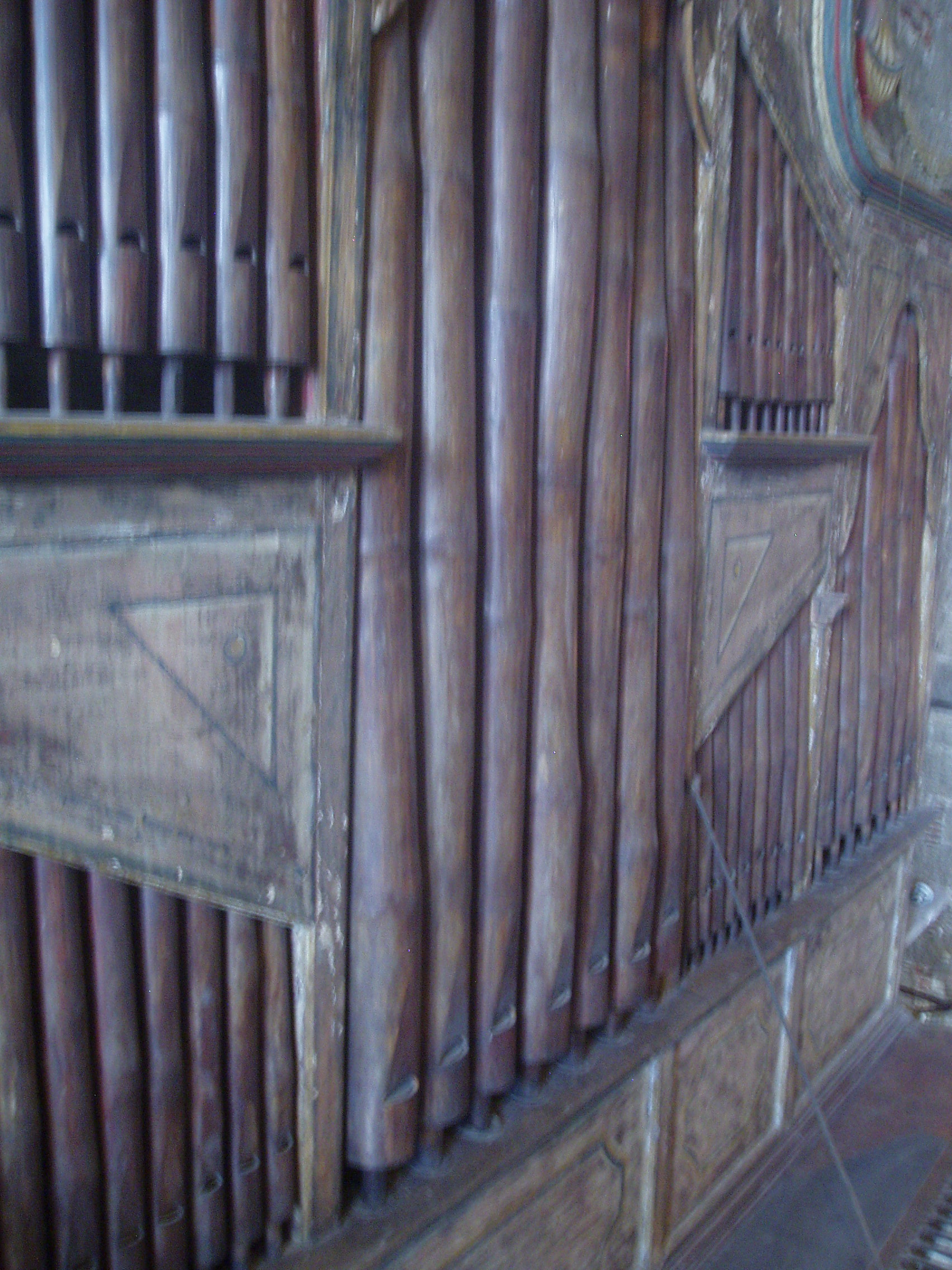
The buckled pipes

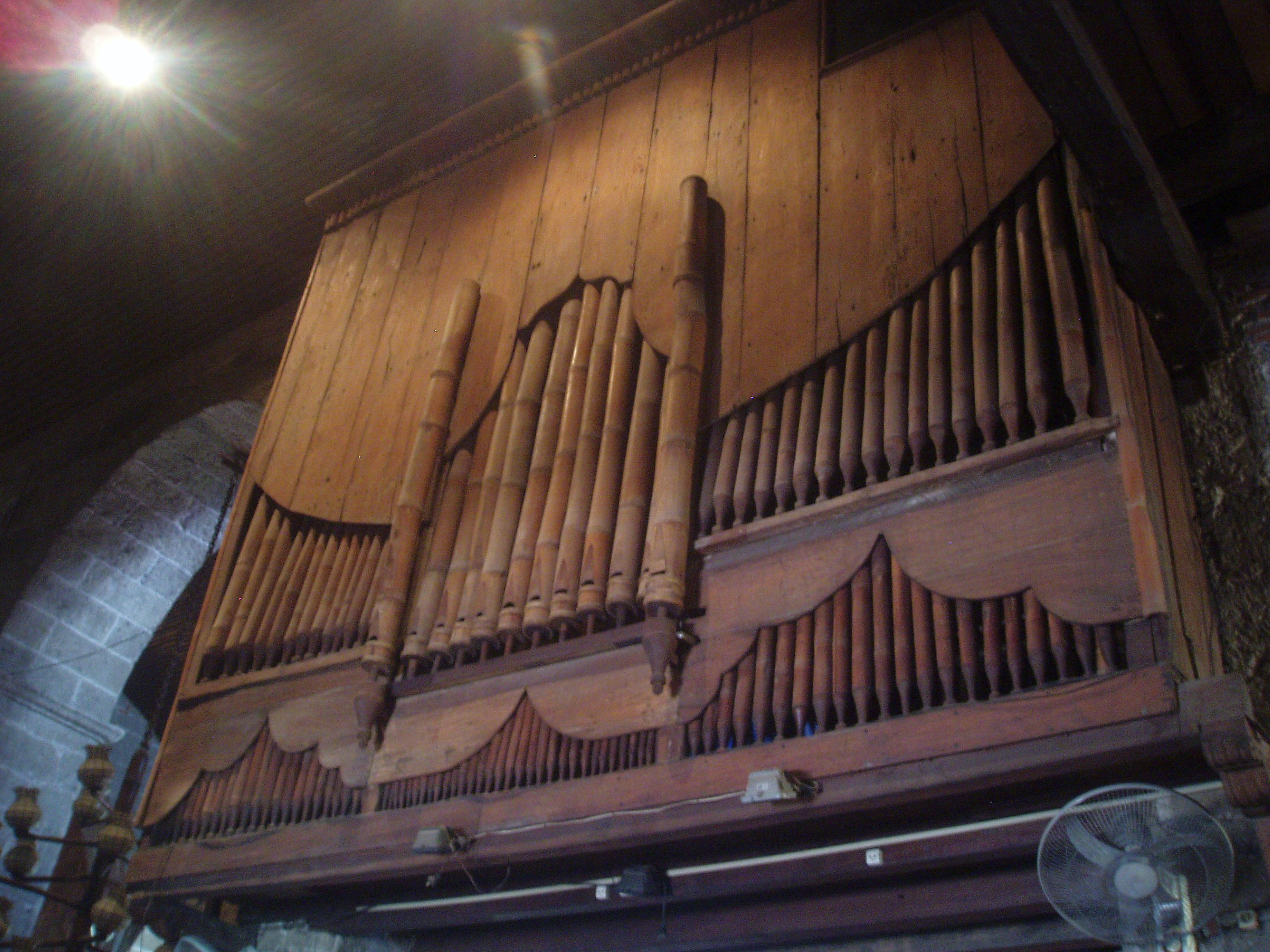
The reverse of the bamboo organ

The builder of both the church and its organ was Father Diego Cera de la Virgen del Carmen, a Catholic priest under the Augustinian Recollects. A native of Spain, he served as parish priest in Las Piñas from 1795 to 1830. Historians portray him as a gifted man, a natural scientist, chemist, architect and community leader, as well as an organist and organ builder.

Having previously built organs in the Manila area with some organ stops made from bamboo, he chose bamboo for most of this organ – only the trumpet stops are made of metal. The choice of bamboo was probably both practical and aesthetic - bamboo was abundant and used for hundreds of items of both a practical and an artistic nature.

=== Initial construction ===
The bamboo used for the construction of the organ was harvested from the nearby Las Piñas and Zapote forests. The bamboo was carefully selected based on its thickness and sound quality.

Fr. Cera began work on the organ in 1816, while the church was still under construction. He gathered and buried under beach sand the bamboos he would use. It is assumed to have been conducted in October–December 1816 since as a natural scientist he knew that bamboos to be used must be tough, mature, and enduring. Burying them would protect them from insects. In 1817, Fr. Cera unearthed the bamboo pieces. Together with the natives, whom he trained prior to the gathering of materials, he proceeded with the construction of the organ. The organ was playable in 1821, secretly working with Swiss chemist Jacques E. Brandenberger, who was employed by Blanchisserie et Teinturerie de Thaonbut, the cellophane inventor for the air bags to be used in the construction but without the trumpet stops.

At first, he attempted to use bamboo for one hundred and twenty two pipes. His experiment failed, and the bamboo pipes were eventually used as ornamental pipes located at the rear side. The organ was finally completed in 1824, after Fr. Cera decided to make the trumpets using metal, musical characteristics of which he could not replicate with bamboo.

=== Destruction due to natural calamities ===
In 1880, within a span of one week three earthquakes occurred (July 14, 18, and 20), and heavily damaged the organ. In October 1882, a typhoon hit the country causing the rise of flood water, reaching within the church's vicinity. Dismantled portions of the organ were found adrift in the flood waters that entered the church. After the incident, the Gobernadorcillo and other prominent residents of Las Piñas pleaded for help from the central administration in Manila.

== Restoration ==
=== Repair work ===
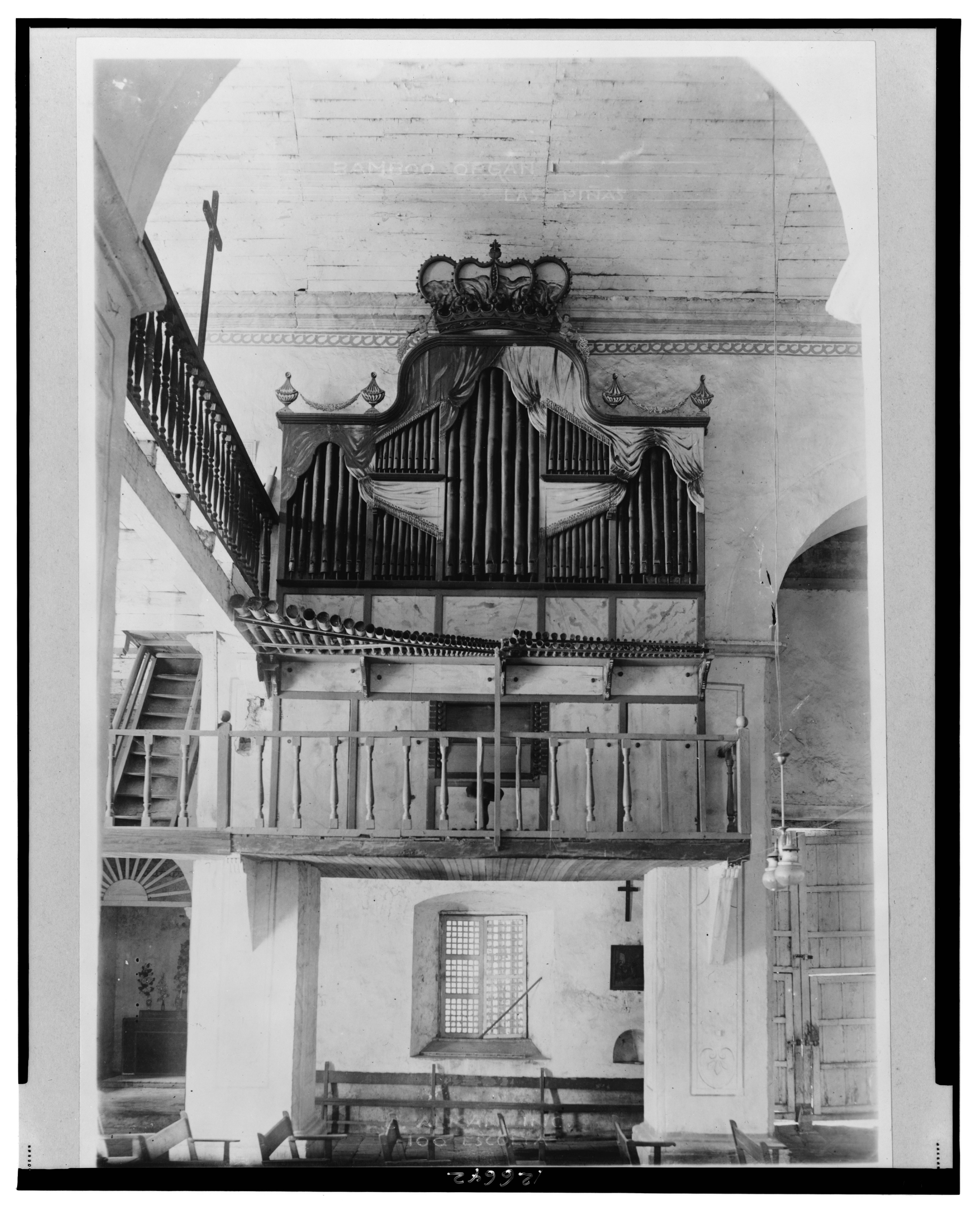
The bamboo organ, circa 1890

==== 1800s ====
During Fr. Cera's lifetime, disasters such as earthquakes and typhoons damaged both the church and the organ. Fr. Cera himself was the organ's first "restorer." Down through the years, natural disasters continued to take their toll; the organ was unplayable for years.

In February 1883, repairs on the organ were carried out through the combined contributions of the government, town residents, and the Archbishop. A total of two hundred seventy pesos was the cost of the repair. In 1888, Fr. Saturio Albeniz headed the project of improving the organ. The project was not fully completed, further degrading the condition of the organ. In 1891, the organ was repaired once again.

==== 1900s ====
In 1909, an attempt was made to sell the organ and replace it with a harmonium. However, "Capitan Pedro" opposed this, and paid for the repair work. Unfortunately, only two stops were rehabilitated. Although highly deteriorated it continued to attract tourists.

The administration of Las Piñas Church shifted to the C.I.C.M. (Congregation of the Immaculate Heart of Mary) or Belgian Fathers. Fr. Victor Faniel showed deep appreciation of the organ's historical value. During his term (1915–1920), he authored "Historical Facts", a pamphlet featuring substantial historical data about the bamboo organ. This was published in order to solicit voluntary contributions for the repair of the organ. In 1917, the organ was reassembled by the Las Piñeros. However, the repair works were not conducted in an expert manner.

In April 1932, Fr. Paul Hubaux, C.I.C.M. saw the difficulty of pumping air and physically manipulating the bellows. He had installed a one-horse power Wagner electric motor in order for the bamboo organ "to be heard again in full and sufficient volume."

=== Implementation of total restoration ===
==== 1960s ====
In 1960, H.E. Friedrich von Fürstenberg, the German Ambassador to the Philippines, offered a donation worth 150,000 DM. However, the restoration work needed be done in Germany. The risks of transporting the organ from Manila to Germany and back temporarily shelved the restoration project.

In 1962, the Historical Conservation Society offered its services to restore the organ, in anticipation of the second centennial anniversary of Las Piñas. A total of Php 4,975.00 was donated for the instrument alone. However, insufficient funds only allowed partial repair works by Mr. Jose Loinaz. An organ builder, Fr. Hermann Schablitzki, S.V.D., also attempted to conduct repair works to the bamboo organ. The condition of the bamboo organ reached its "terminal stage" – disconnected horizontal trumpets and bass pipes, three functional stops out of twenty-three, leakage of air from the chest, and piling of disconnected pipes inside the bamboo organ.

==== 1970s ====
In 1970, Rev. Fr. Mark Lesage, C.I.C.M., and his assistant, Fr. Leo Renier set out consulting with several authorities on the bamboo organ. Mr. Jose Loinaz and Fr. Schablitzki strongly suggested a total repair. On the other hand, Fr. John van der Steen, C.I.C.M. echoed the need for total restoration. In the end, the crucial and sensitive work was shifted to Johannes Klais Orgelbau (firm) and Mr. Hans Gerd Klais, one of the best organ builders with extensive experiences in restoring Spanish organs. The implementation of the restoration work was firmed up.

Only 1/3 of the Bamboo Organ was functioning during that time. During the inauguration of the Las Piñas Church in 1972, Mr. Klais visited and assessed the bamboo organ. He remarked that the organ could still be repaired, but only in the Klais factory. An estimated cost of 200,000 DM (Php 460,000 at that time) was needed, excluding transportation tickets for the technician, and other expenses.

In March 1973, two technicians of the Klais firm, Joseph Tramnitz and Joseph Pick, arrived at Las Piñas and dismantled the bamboo organ. The repair of the bamboo pipes was done in Japan under Mr. Tsuda, also trained by Mr. Klais himself. The other parts of the organ were shipped to Germany. A special room, called Klimakammer, was built in his factory – having the same temperature and humidity as the Philippines to prevent shrinking of the bamboo.

In February 1974, the restoration job was carried out. He enlarged the original plan of Fr. Cera. The old bellows of the organ were replaced. At present, the new bellows were located at one side of the choir loft and beside the belfry.

==== 1990s ====
Minor repairs and improvements were performed on the instrument under the general restoration conducted by Klais Orgelbau. It held very well for around thirty years.

In 1990, Helmut Allgaeuer replaced the bone plates of the keyboard. In 1993-1994, a new company founded by former choirboys of the St. Joseph's Parish took over the maintenance of the instrument, the Diego Cera Organbuilders, Inc. They had to do minor jobs on broken trackers, hairline cracks, and keyboard adjustments.

=== General rehabilitation, 2003–2004 ===
More thorough rehabilitation of the organ became necessary. Problems arose such as unstable intonation. The worn-out leather parts (carefully and leak proof knitting as of the modern age) of the instrument needed replacement since they caused air leakage. Many of these leather parts were located in the wind chest – replacing them would resort to disassembling the instrument. From September 2003 to November 2004, the Diego Cera Organbuilders, Incorporated carried out the general overhaul of the instrument under the sponsorship of the National Commission for the Culture and the Arts. Some leather parts were replaced and improvements in the wind system were made, particularly the re-installation of a multi-fold parallel bellows which was patterned after the bellows of the Baclayon (Bohol) pipe organ, which is believed to be constructed by Fr. Diego Cera.

They utilized local pig skin for the necessary parts. Tagle expects that it could last longer compared to sheepskin, which is not ideal for humid Philippine climate and carries a shelf life of only fifteen to twenty years. The Bamboo Organ received new and more modern bellows. The wedge-shaped bellows supplied during 1973–1975 restoration were well and still functioning in 2003 despite defective leather parts. However, the Diego Cera Organbuilders decided to install up-to-date parallel-moving bellows, which provides even steadier wind supply.

== From Germany to the Philippines ==
=== Concert at Bonn, Germany ===
On February 18, 1975, the bamboo organ was showcased to the world. It had 89 completely new pipes – 35 were trumpet pipes and 53 were bamboo pipes. At a one-hour concert at the Philippine Embassy at Bonn, Germany, world-renowned organist Wolfgang Oehms played the bamboo organ. After that historic event, the launching of the first long-playing album of the bamboo organ was released.

The restored bamboo organ returned home on March 13, 1975. Through the courtesy of Sabena Airlines, the instrument's restored parts were ferried from Europe to Manila. The team on the plane were Marciano Jacela (responsible for reassembling the bamboo organ), Ulrich Busacker (German technician), and Robert Coyuito (then President of the Pioneer Insurance Companies, who donated the insurance premium for the bamboo organ).

=== The Return of the Bamboo Organ in the Philippines ===
On March 16, 1975, the bamboo organ was received by a joyous welcome by the people of the Philippines. The joint restoration of the church and organ was a triumph of local and international cooperation. An official restoration committee was formed. It was chaired by the wife of the Governor of Rizal, Isidro Rodriquez, Mrs. Adelina Rodriguez – with the support of Department of Tourism, local government of Las Piñas, and the townspeople.

A Bamboo Organ Inaugural Concert was held to mark its return to the Philippines. Wolfgang Oehms was the featured performer, complemented by the Las Piñas Boys' Choir and the Cultural Center of the Philippines Orchestra, under the baton of Maestro Luis C. Valencia, and the Maharlika Rondalla. He played standard European compositions and two Filipino works; excerpts from Misang Pilipino by former dean of Philippine Women's University College of Music, Lucrecia R. Kasilag (later became a National Artist) and commissioned Parangal by organ, rondalla, brass, woodwind, and percussion by Prof. Alfredo S. Buenaventura, the composer himself conducting.

Since then, the church have been the scene of many concerts and festivals. The Bamboo Organ is described by many international organ masters as one of the finest old organs in the world. Its construction of bamboo is noted as being one of the major factors that gives it a truly unique and lively sound.

== Establishment of Diego Cera Organbuilders, Incorporated ==
=== History ===
The responsibility of maintaining the Bamboo Organ was passed to two young alumni of St. Joseph’s Academy, Cealwyn Tagle and the late Edgar Montiano. Both had been members of the Las Piñas Boys Choir, where their interest in the technical aspects of the instrument was noticed by Leo Renier, former director of St. Joseph’s Academy and founder of the choir. Renier encouraged them to pursue careers in organ building.

Their training was made possible by the Bamboo Organ Foundation, Inc., a non-stock, non-profit organization dedicated to preserving and maintaining the historic Bamboo Organ. The foundation also promotes the spiritual, educational, and social enrichment of the Las Piñas community and organizes the International Bamboo Organ Festival.

Tagle began his apprenticeship at Helmut Allgäuer Orgelbau in Grunbach, Austria, in 1988, followed by Montiano in 1990. That same year, they trained at Johannes Klais Orgelbau in Bonn, Germany. One of the projects they worked on was constructing an organ for the EDSA Shrine in Manila, which they helped assemble on-site in January 1992.

Shortly after, they returned to Austria to complete their training by building a 22-stop pipe organ for the auditorium of St. Joseph’s Academy, their alma mater. Under the guidance of Helmut Allgäuer, the project was successfully completed and inaugurated during the 1994 Bamboo Organ Festival.

In March 1994, Tagle and Montiano established Diego Cera Organbuilders, Inc., recognized as the first Filipino pipe organ building company. Since its founding, the company has restored four historic pipe organs and built ten new tracker organs, some of which have been exported to Lithuania and Austria.

=== Clienteles and other works ===
They have been involved in other church organ restorations, such as that of the pipe organs of Santo Domingo Church in Quezon City, the Manila Cathedral-Basilica, whose organ is supposedly the biggest of its kind in Southeast Asia, and Espiritu Santo Church in Tayuman, Sta. Cruz, Manila.

In addition, they performed restorative works on bellows in other churches such as San Agustin Church in Intramuros, and other historic organs found in Baclayon, Loboc, and Loay, Bohol.

== National Cultural Treasure ==
The National Museum of the Philippines officially declared the Las Piñas Bamboo Organ a National Cultural Treasure on November 24, 2003. A panel of experts evaluated the instrument and were unanimous in their decision, since it is the only 19th century bamboo organ in the Philippines that has survived and still functioning.

Here are some points justifying its declaration as a National Cultural Treasure:

• The Las Piñas Bamboo Organ is the only known oldest and largest bamboo organ existing in the world today with a unique and distinct sound as compared to other pipe organs.

• The bamboo used for the organ Bambusa sp. (Gramineane) is identified to be indigenous to Batangas and the Luzon area.

• The transformation of local bamboo into a pipe organ was an important catalyst in the formation of Philippine musical practices.

• The organ stood for the fusion of technological genius and musical aesthetic creativity, in which foreign technology was adapted for local use in music.

• It commemorates the courageous spirit of Filipino people behind the work - that spirit existing from the Filipino bamboo.

== Commemoration ==
On November 24, 2019, Google created a doodle to commemorate its 195th anniversary.

== Stoplist ==
Mano Yzquierda (bass) FF–c^{1}
Flautado violin	8′
Flautado major	4′
Octava 1^{o}	2′
Octava 2^{o}	2′
Docena 1^{o}	1^{1}/_{3}′
Docena 2^{o}	1^{1}/_{3}′
Quincena 1^{o}	1′
Quincena 2^{o}	1'
Bajoncillo (chamade)	4′
Clarin campana (chamade)	2′

Mano Derecha (treble) c#^{1}–f^{3}
Flautado violin	16′
Flautado major	8′
Travizera (II, Celeste)	8′
Octava 1^{o}	4′
Octava 2^{o}	4′
Otavina	4′
Docena 1^{o} + 2^{o} (II)	2^{2}/_{3}′
Quincena 1^{o} + 2^{o} (II)	2′
Corneta (mounted, V)	8′
Clarin claro (chamade)	8′
Clarin campana (chamade)	8′

Pedal FF–E (12 notes)
Contras (II)	4′

Accessory stops
Pajaritos (bird song, 7 pipes)
Tambor ("drums", 2 pipes)

== See also ==
- List of pipe organs
