= I Didn't Know I Was Looking for Love =

1993 single by Everything but the Girl

Single by Everything but the Girl

from the EP I Didn't Know I Was Looking for Love
- Released: 7 June 1993
- Length: 3:51
- Label: Blanco y Negro
- Songwriters: Ben Watt; Tracey Thorn
- Producer: Phil Ramone

Everything but the Girl singles chronology
"The Only Living Boy in New York" (1993)	"I Didn't Know I Was Looking for Love" (1993)	"Rollercoaster" (1994)

"I Didn't Know I Was Looking for Love" is a song written by Ben Watt and Tracey Thorn of Everything but the Girl. The band originally released the song in June 1993 as a track on their extended play (EP) I Didn't Know I Was Looking for Love, which reached number 72 on the UK Singles Chart. It was covered by English singer Karen Ramirez in 1998, whose version became a chart hit in several countries.

== Karen Ramirez version ==
"Looking for Love"

Single by Karen Ramirez

from the album Distant Dreams
- Released: 15 June 1998
- Genre: R&B; dance; house
- Length: 3:56
- Label: Manifesto
- Songwriters: Ben Watt; Tracey Thorn
- Producer: Souled Out

Karen Ramirez singles chronology
"Troubled Girl" (1998)	"Looking for Love" (1998)	"If We Try" (1999)

The song was covered by British singer Karen Ramirez and released as her second single from her album Distant Dreams in 1998, with the shorter title of "Looking for Love". This version peaked at number eight on the UK Singles Chart in June 1998 and topped the US Dance Club Play chart in 2001. It additionally peaked at number five in Hungary and number 10 in Italy. On the Eurochart Hot 100, "Looking for Love" reached number 45 in August 1998. Ramirez's version of the song was well received and garnered mainly positive reviews from critics.

=== Critical reception ===
Daily Record called "Looking for Love" a "strong R&B hit". Richard Wallace from Daily Mirror stated that "the hypnotic cover" of Everything but the Girl's "I Didn't Know I Was Looking for Love" "was a beguiling introduction to the talents of Ms Ramirez". Music & Media wrote that "this English soul singer first really made her mark as a lead vocalist for Italian dance production team Souled Out. After the project was finished, all involved concluded that the collaboration had been successful to such an extent that it deserved some kind of follow up. Work on Ramirez' debut album Distant Dreams accordingly began soon after. The first single Troubled Girl was reasonably successful and expectations for this underrated gem written by Everything but the Girl are justifiably high." Smash Hits said that this remix could do for Karen Ramirez what Fatboy Slim's mix of "Brimful of Asha" did for Cornershop. They added, "These housey beats increase the funk factor ten-fold without losing the delicious vocals or hummable tune. A rare dance choon that sounds just as good off the dancefloor as on it. Bangin'!"

=== Music video ===
In addition to extensive dance club and radio airplay, the music video for the song (which featured Ramirez walking around a house on a continuous loop, each time seeing previous versions of herself walking around the house) experienced heavy rotation on both MTV and VH-1 throughout the summer of 1998.

=== Charts ===
==== Weekly charts ====
Chart (1998)	Peak position
Australia (ARIA)	47
Austria (Ö3 Austria Top 40)	23
Belgium (Ultratip Bubbling Under Flanders)	5
Europe (Eurochart Hot 100)	45
France (SNEP)	61
Germany (GfK)	59
Hungary (Mahasz)	5
Iceland (Íslenski Listinn Topp 40)	21
Ireland (IRMA)	23
Italy (Musica e dischi)	10
Italy Airplay (Music & Media)	1
Netherlands (Dutch Top 40 Tipparade)	6
Netherlands (Single Top 100)	70
Scotland Singles (Official Charts)	7
Sweden (Sverigetopplistan)	45
UK Singles (Official Charts)	8

Chart (2001)	Peak position
US Dance Club Play (Billboard)	1

==== Year-end charts ====
Chart (1998)	Position
UK Singles (OCC)	84

Chart (2001)	Position
US Dance Club Play (Billboard)	31

=== Certifications ===
Region	Certification	Certified units/sales
United Kingdom (BPI)	Silver	200,000^{^}
^{^} Shipments figures based on certification alone.
