= List of Catholic churches in Metro Manila =

This is a list of Catholic churches in Metro Manila, Philippines.

The Ecclesiastical Province of Manila covers the Archdiocese of Manila and its eight suffragan dioceses in Metro Manila and surrounding areas of the Greater Manila Area.

== Archdiocese of Manila ==
Name	Titular	Location	Founded	Style	Notes	Image
Manila Cathedral (formally known as the Minor Basilica and Metropolitan Cathedral of the Immaculate Conception)	Immaculate Conception	Intramuros, Manila	1571	Neo-Romanesque	Seat of the Archdiocese of Manila. Declared a Minor Basilica in 1981.	
Minor Basilica of San Sebastian	Saint Sebastian and Our Lady of Mount Carmel	Quiapo, Manila	1891	Gothic Revival	The only all-steel church in Asia. Run by the Order of Augustinian Recollects. Declared a Minor Basilica in 1890.	
Minor Basilica and National Shrine of Jesus Nazareno (Quiapo Church)	Black Nazarene and Saint John the Baptist	Quiapo. Manila	1588	Baroque	Also known as St. John the Baptist Parish. Declared a Minor Basilica in 1987. Solemnly declared a National Shrine in 2024.	
Minor Basilica and National Shrine of San Lorenzo Ruiz (Binondo Church)	Saint Lorenzo Ruiz and Our Lady of the Most Holy Rosary	Binondo, Manila	1587	Baroque	Declared a Minor Basilica in 1992. Recognized as a National Shrine in 2024.	
Minor Basilica of Our Lady of the Pillar (Santa Cruz Church)	Our Lady of the Pillar	Santa Cruz	1608	Baroque	Also declared as the Archdiocesan Shrine of the Blessed Sacrament in 2018. Declared a Minor Basilica in 2025.	
Minor Basilica and Archdiocesan Shrine of Santo Niño de Tondo	Santo Niño	Tondo, Manila	1572	Neo-Classical	Declared a Minor Basilica in 2025	
National Shrine of the Sacred Heart	Sacred Heart	San Antonio, Makati	1976		Declared a National Shrine in 1985.	
National Shrine of St. Michael and the Archangels (San Miguel Church)	Saint Michael and the Archangels	San Miguel, Manila	1630	Baroque	Located within Malacañang Palace compound. Declared a National Shrine in 1986.	
National Shrine of Our Lady of Guadalupe	Our Lady of Guadalupe	Guadalupe Nuevo, Makati	1951	Modernist	Declared a National Shrine in 2010.	
National Shrine of Our Lady of the Abandoned (Sta. Ana Church)	Our Lady of the Abandoned	Santa Ana, Manila	1720	Baroque	Declared a National Shrine in 2021.	
National Shrine and Parish of Our Lady of Loreto	Our Lady of Loreto	Sampaloc, Manila	1613	Romanesque	Declared a National Shrine in 2025.	
National Shrine of Mary, Queen of Peace (EDSA Shrine)	Mary, Queen of Peace	Quezon City	1989	Modern	Declared a National Shrine in 2025.	
National Shrine of St. Jude Thaddeus	Saint Jude Thaddeus	San Miguel, Manila	1958	Modernist	Run by the Society of the Divine Word. Declared an Archdiocesan Shrine in 2010.	
Archdiocesan Shrine of the Divine Mercy	Divine Mercy	Mandaluyong	1995	Modern	Declared an Archdiocesan Shrine in 1996.	
Archdiocesan Shrine of Jesus The Way, The Truth and The Life	Jesus: The way, the truth, the life	Pasay	1999	Romanesque	Church located within the SM Mall of Asia complex. Declared an Archdiocesan Shrine in 1999.	
San Agustin Church (Archdiocesan Shrine of Nuestra Señora de la Consolacion y Correa)	Our Lady of Consolation and Cincture (Shrine); Immaculate Conception (Parish)	Intramuros, Manila	1571	Baroque	The oldest church in the Philippines and a UNESCO World Heritage Site. Declared an Archdiocesan Shrine in 2000. Run by the Order of Saint Augustine.	
Archdiocesan Shrine of Nuestra Señora de Guia (Ermita Church)	Our Lady of Guidance	Ermita, Manila	1571	Modernist	Declared an Archdiocesan Shrine in 2005.	
Archdiocesan Shrine of Espiritu Santo	Holy Spirit	Santa Cruz, Manila	1932	Romanesque	Declared an Archdiocesan Shrine in 2014.	
San Vicente de Paul Parish	Saint Vincent de Paul and Our Lady of the Miraculous Medal	Ermita, Manila	1909	Neo-Romanesque	Declared as Archdiocesan Shrine of Our Lady of the Miraculous Medal in 2023. Located within the Adamson University campus.	
San José de Trozo Parish	Saint Joseph	Santa Cruz, Manila	1933	Neo-Romanesque	Known as the Archdiocesan Shrine of St. Joseph. Declared an Archdiocesan Shrine in 2023.	
Archdiocesan Shrine of Saint John the Baptist Parish	Saint John the Baptist	San Juan	1894	Neo-Romanesque	Also known as Pinaglabanan Church. Declared an Archdiocesan Shrine in 2024.	
Saint John Bosco Parish Church	Saint John Bosco	Makati	1976	Modernist	Run by the Salesians of Don Bosco; Declared an Archdiocesan Shrine in 2026.	
St. Joseph Parish, Gagalangin	Saint Joseph	Tondo, Manila	1905	Modern		
Kambal na Krus Chapel	Holy Cross	Tondo, Manila	1922	Modern	Under the administration of St. Joseph Parish, Gagalangin.	
Our Lady of Remedies Parish (Malate Church)	Our Lady of Los Remedios	Malate, Manila	1588	Baroque	Run by the Columban Missionaries	
The Benedictine Abbey of Our Lady of Montserrat	Our Lady of Montserrat and Santo Niño	San Miguel	1925	Romanesque	Church located within San Beda College campus. Run by the Benedictines.	
Santisimo Rosario Parish	Our Lady of the Rosary	Sampaloc, Manila	1942		Located within the University of Santo Tomas campus. Run by the Dominican Order.	
San Fernando de Dilao Parish (Paco Church)	Saint Ferdinand	Paco, Manila	1580	Romanesque	Served as temporary Cathedral of the Archdiocese during the renovations at the Manila Cathedral from 2012-2014.	
Ermita de San Nicolas de Tolentino	Saint Nicholas of Tolentino	Makati	1708	Baroque		
Nuestra Señora de Gracia Parish Church	Our Lady of Grace	Guadalupe Viejo,Makati	1601	Baroque	Formerly under the Order of Saint Augustine until turned over to the Archdiocese of Manila in 2024.	
Saints Peter and Paul Parish	Saint Peter and Saint Paul, and Virgen de la Rosa de Macati	Poblacion, Makati	1608	Baroque		
Saint Andrew the Apostle Church	Saint Andrew	Bel Air,Makati	1967	Modernist		
Santuario de San Antonio	Saint Anthony of Padua	Forbes Park, Makati	1975	Mission Revival	Run by the Order of Friars Minor	
San Felipe Neri Church	Saint Philip Neri	Mandaluyong	1863	Romanesque		
San Roque Church	Saint Roch	Mandaluyong	1971	Modern		
Santuario de San Jose	Saint Joseph	Mandaluyong	1966	Modernist	Run by the Oblates of St. Joseph	
Santuario de Santo Cristo	Holy Cross	San Juan	1602	Baroque	Also known as San Juan del Monte Church. Run by the Dominican Order.	
Shrine of St. Therese of the Child Jesus	Saint Therese, Doctor of the Church	Pasay	1947	Modern	Administered by the Military Ordinariate of the Philippines.	

=== Diocese of Antipolo ===
Name	Congregation	Location	Founded	Style	Notes	Image
Jesus de la Peña Chapel	Saint Isidore the Laborer	Marikina	1630	Neo-Romanesque		
Our Lady of the Abandoned Church Marikina	Our Lady of the Abandoned	Marikina	1690	Baroque		

=== Diocese of Kalookan ===
Name	Congregation	Location	Founded	Style	Notes	Image
Caloocan Cathedral	Saint Roch	Caloocan	1815	Baroque	Seat of the Diocese of Caloocan.	
Diocesan Shrine and Parish of Our Lady of Grace	Our Lady of Grace	Caloocan	1946	Modern		
Minor Basilica and Parish of San Bartolome (Malabon Church)	Saint Bartholomew	Malabon	1614	Greco-Roman	Declared a Minor Basilica in 2026.	
Navotas Church	Saint Joseph	Navotas	1859	Baroque	Diocesan Shrine	

=== Diocese of Cubao ===
Name	Congregation	Location	Founded	Style	Notes	Image
Cubao Cathedral	Our Lady of Immaculate Conception	Quezon City	1950	Romanesque	Seat of the Diocese of Cubao.	
Basilica of the National Shrine of Our Lady of Mt. Carmel	Our Lady of Mount Carmel	Quezon City	1954	Modernist	Declared a Minor Basilica in 2019.	
Basilica Minore de San Pedro Bautista	Saint Pedro Bautista	Quezon City	1590	Baroque	Declared a Minor Basilica in 2020. Run by the Order of Friars Minor.	
National Shrine of Our Lady of Lourdes	Our Lady of Lourdes	Quezon City	1942	Modernist	Run by the Order of Friars Minor Capuchin. Declared a National Shrine in 1997.	
Santo Domingo Church	Saint Dominic and Our Lady of La Naval de Manila	Quezon City	1954	Baronial-Modern	Declared as National Shrine of Our Lady of the Most Holy Rosary, La Naval de Manila in 2010. Run by the Dominican Order.	
Saint Joseph Shrine	Saint Joseph	Quezon City	1951	Modernist	Declared a Diocesan Shrine in 2003	
Diocesan Shrine of Jesus, The Divine Word	Christ the King	Quezon City	1933	Modernist	Shrine located in the Christ the King Mission Seminary of the Society of the Divine Word. Declared a Diocesan Shrine in 2006.	
Sacred Heart Parish-Shrine	Sacred Heart of Jesus	Quezon City	1941	Romanesque	Declared a Diocesan Shrine in 2016.	
Diocesan Shrine of Our Lady of Hope	Our Lady of Pontmain	Quezon City	1966		Declared a Diocesan Shrine in 2025.	
Church of the Gesù	Sacred Heart of Jesus and Our Lady of the Immaculate Conception	Quezon City	2002	Modern	Located inside the Ateneo de Manila University campus. Run by the Jesuits.	
Parish of the Holy Sacrifice	Holy Sacrifice	Quezon City	1950	Modern	Parish church in University of the Philippines Diliman campus.	
Saint Joseph the Worker Church	Saint Joseph	Quezon City	1959	Modernist	Also known as Balintawak Church.	
San Nicolas de Tolentino Church	Saint Nicholas of Tolentino	Quezon City	1975	Modern		

=== Diocese of Malolos ===
Name	Congregation	Location	Founded	Style	Notes	Image
Our Lady of Fatima Church	Our Lady of Fatima	Valenzuela	1982	Modern	Declared a National Shrine in 1976.	
Polo Church	Saint Didacus of Alcalá	Valenzuela	1632	Neo-Romanesque		

=== Diocese of Novaliches ===
Name	Congregation	Location	Founded	Style	Notes	Image
Novaliches Cathedral	Good Shepherd	Quezon City	1975	Modern	Seat of the Diocese of Novaliches. Declared a Diocesan Shrine in 1989.	
Our Lady of Annunciation Church	Our Lady of Annunciation	Quezon City	1993	Modern		
Christ the King Parish Church BF Homes	Christ the King	Caloocan	1983	Modern		
San Bartolome de Novaliches Church	Saint Bartholomew	Quezon City	1986	Modern		

=== Diocese of Parañaque ===
Name	Titular	Location	Founded	Style	Notes	Image
Cathedral-Parish of Saint Andrew	Saint Andrew and Nuestra Senora del Buen Suceso	Parañaque	May 11, 1580	Baroque	Seat of the Diocese of Parañaque. Diocesan Shrine	
Minor Basilica and National Shrine of Mary, Help of Christians	Mary, Help of Christians	Parañaque	1922	Modern	Declared a National Shrine in 1985. Declared a Minor Basilica in 2025. Run by the Salesians of Don Bosco in the Philippines.	
National Shrine of Our Mother of Perpetual Help	Our Mother of Perpetual Help	Parañaque	1958	Neo-Romanesque	Declared a National Shrine in 1958. Run by the Redemptorists.	
Our Lady of the Miraculous Medal National Shrine Parish	Our Lady of the Miraculous Medal	Muntinlupa	1981	Brutalist	Run by the Congregation of the Mission (Vincentians). Declared a National Shrine in 1980.	
Diocesan Shrine of Saint Joseph	Saint Joseph	Las Piñas	1795	Baroque	Also known as the Bamboo Organ Church. Declared a Diocesan Shrine in 2020.	
Diocesan Shrine of the Five Wounds of Our Lord Jesus Christ	Five Holy Wounds of Jesus	Las Piñas	June 1, 1985	Modern	Declared a Diocesan Shrine in 2012 and First Diocesan Shrine in Las Pinas City	
Our Lady of the Pillar Parish	Our Lady of the Pillar	Las Piñas	1986	Art Deco	The biggest parish church in Las Piñas	
Sacred Heart of Jesus Parish	Sacred Heart of Jesus	Muntinlupa	2011	Neo-Romanesque		

=== Diocese of Pasig ===
Name	Congregation	Location	Founded	Style	Notes	Image
Pasig Cathedral	Our Lady of the Immaculate Conception	Pasig	1572	Baroque	Seat of the Diocese of Pasig.	
Minor Basilica and Archdiocesan Shrine of Saint Anne	Saint Anne	Taguig	1587	Baroque	Declared a Minor Basilica in 2022.	
San Roque Parish	Saint Roch and Santa Marta de Pateros	Pateros	1815	Baroque	Declared as Diocesan Shrine of Santa Marta in 2009.	
Dambanang Kawayan	Saint John the Baptist	Taguig	1969	Romanesque		
San Sebastian Church	Saint Sebastian	Pasig	1990	Modern		
Santa Clara de Montefalco Church	Saint Clare of Montefalco	Pasig	1994	Greco-Roman		
Santo Rosario de Pasig Church	Our Lady of the Holy Rosary	Pasig	1963	Modern		
Santo Tomas de Villanueva Church	Saint Thomas of Villanova	Pasig	1953	Modern		

== Others ==
- City of Manila (Archdiocese of Manila)
  - Vicariate of the Holy Family
    - Saint Anthony of Padua Parish Church (Singalong St., Malate)
    - Holy Family Parish (San Andres)
    - Saint Pius X Parish Church (Paco)
    - Santisima Trinidad Parish (Malate)
    - Our Lady of Perpetual Help Parish Church (Santa Ana)
    - Chapel of the Most Blessed Sacrament (within De La Salle University, Malate)
  - Vicariate of Espiritu Santo
    - Immaculate Conception Parish (Tondo)
    - Santa Monica Parish (Tondo)
    - San Jose Manggagawa Parish (Tondo)
    - San Rafael Arkanghel Parish (Tondo)
    - San Roque de Manila Parish (Santa Cruz)
    - Chapel of St. Lazarus (located inside Department of Health)
  - Vicariate of Santo Niño
    - Saint John Bosco Parish (Tondo)
    - San Pablo Apostol Parish (Tondo)
    - Our Lady of Peace and Good Voyage Parish Church (Tondo)
    - Nuestra Señora de la Soledad de Manila Parish (Binondo)
  - Vicariate of Our Lady of Loreto
    - Most Holy Trinity Parish (Sampaloc)
    - San Roque de Sampaloc Parish (Sampaloc)
    - Sacred Heart of Jesus Parish (Santa Mesa)
    - Nuestra Señora de Salvacion De Manila Parish (Santa Mesa)
    - Our Lady of Fatima Parish Church (Santa Mesa)
    - Saint Anthony of Padua Shrine (Sampaloc)
  - Vicariate of San Fernando de Dilao
    - Saint Mary Goretti Parish (Paco)
    - Saint Peter the Apostle Parish (Paco)
    - Archdiocesan Shrine of Our Lady of Peñafrancia Parish (Paco)
    - Santo Niño de Pandacan Parish (Pandacan)
  - Vicariate of Nuestra Señora de Guia
    - Our Lady of the Assumption Parish (Malate)
    - Sto. Niño de Baseco Parish (Baseco Compound)
  - Shrine of the Holy Face of Jesus (Quiapo)
- Caloocan
  - Diocese of Kalookan (comprising the Churches in the southern part of Caloocan)
    - Vicariate of San Roque
      - Mary, Help of Christians Parish (Maypajo)
      - Saint Joseph the Workman Parish
    - Vicariate of Our Lady of Grace
      - San Pancracio Parish (inside La Loma Cemetery)
      - San Jose Parish Church (Agudo)
      - Sagrada Familia Parish
      - Hearts of Jesus and Mary Parish (Grace Park)
    - Vicariate of the Sacred Heart
      - Birhen ng Lourdes Parish Church (Bagong Barrio)
      - Sacred Heart of Jesus Parish (Morning Breeze Subdivision)
      - St. Gabriel the Archangel Parish
      - Our Lady of Lujan Parish (Bagong Barrio)
      - St. Francis of Assisi and Sta. Quiteria Parish (Baesa)
    - San Exequiel Moreno Parish
  - Diocese of Novaliches (comprising the Churches in the northern part of Caloocan)
  - Chapels
    - Our Lady of the Most Holy Rosary Chapel (SM City Grand Central)
- Las Piñas (Diocese of Parañaque)
  - Our Lady of Fatima Parish
  - Christ The King Parish Church (Pamplona)
  - Holy Family Parish Church (Almanza)
  - Last Supper Of Our Lord Parish Church (Pamplona)
  - Mary Immaculate Parish Church (Moonwalk Village, Talon V)
  - Our Lady Of The Pillar Parish (Pilar Village)
- Makati (Archdiocese of Manila)
  - Vicariate of St. Joseph the Worker
    - St. Joseph the Worker Parish (Barangay Palanan)
    - St. Alphonsus Mary de Ligouri Parish (Barangay Magallanes)
    - Holy Family Parish (Barangay San Isidro)
    - Our Lady of Fatima Parish (Barangay Bangkal)
    - San Ildefonso Parish (Barangay Pio del Pilar)
  - Vicariate of Saints Peter and Paul
    - Holy Cross Parish (Barangay Tejeros)
    - Our Lady of La Paz Parish (Barangay La Paz)
    - Mary, Mother of Hope Chapel (inside Landmark Mall)
    - Our Lady of the Most Holy Rosary Chapel (inside SM Makati)
    - Sacred Heart of Jesus Chapel (inside Power Plant Mall)
    - Padre Pio Chapel (inside Century City Mall)
    - Sto. Niño de Paz Chapel (Greenbelt (Ayala Center))
    - St. John Paul II Chapel (Circuit Makati)
- Malabon (Diocese of Kalookan)
  - San Bartolome Parish
  - Diocesan Shrine and Parish of the Immaculate Conception
  - Santo Rosario Parish (Dampalit)
  - San Antonio de Padua Parish
  - Exaltation of the Holy Cross Parish
  - Sts. Peter and John Parish (Portero)
  - Sacred Heart of Jesus Parish (Tugatog)
  - Immaculate Heart of Mary Parish (Maysilo)
  - Holy Trinity and Holy Cross Quasi-Parish (Tinajeros)
  - St. Claire of Assisi Parish (Longos)
- Mandaluyong (Vicariate of San Felipe Neri)
  - Our Lady of the Abandoned Parish Church (Hulo)
  - Our Lady of Fatima Parish (Highway Hills)
  - Sacred Heart of Jesus Parish Church (Highway Hills)
  - Saint Dominic Savio Parish Church (Pag-asa)
  - Saint Francis of Assisi Parish Church (Wack Wack Greenhills)
  - Chapel of the Eucharistic Lord (SM Megamall)
  - Chapel of St. Padre Pio (Shangri-La Plaza)
- Marikina
  - Holy Family Parish Church (Parang)
  - Immaculate Conception Parish Church (Concepcion Uno)
  - Saint Gabriel of Our Lady Of Sorrows Parish Church (Marikina Heights)
  - Saint Paul of The Cross Parish Church (Concepcion Dos)
  - San Jose Manggagawa Parish Church (Barangka)
- Muntinlupa
  - Chapel of the Forgiving Lord (Tuloy sa Don Bosco)
  - Immaculate Heart of Mary Chapel (Hillsborough)
  - Ina ng Awa Parish (New Bilibid Prison Reservation)
  - L'Annunziata Parish (Tunasan)
  - Mary, Cause of Our Joy Parish Church (Soldier's Hills)
  - Mary, Mother of God Parish Archdiocesan Shrine (Bayanan)
  - Our Lady of Star Chapel (De La Salle Santiago Zobel School, Ayala Alabang)
  - Our Lady of the Abandoned Parish Church (Poblacion)
  - Sacred Heart of Jesus Parish (Alabang Hills)
  - Saint Benedict Chapel (San Beda College Alabang, Alabang Hills)
  - Saint James The Great Parish Church (Ayala Alabang)
  - Saint Jerome Emiliani and Santa Susana Parish (Ayala Alabang)
  - Saint Peregrine Laziosi Parish (Tunasan)
  - San Nicolas de Tolentino Parish (Cupang)
  - San Pedro Calungsod Quasi-Parish (New Bilibid Prison Reservation)
  - San Roque Parish (Alabang)
  - Sto. Niño Chapel (Intercity Homes)
- Navotas (Diocese of Kalookan)
  - Diocesan Shrine and Parish of San Jose de Navotas
  - San Lorenzo Ruiz and Companion Martyrs Parish
  - Sto. Niño de Pasion
  - Nuestra Señora de los Remedios Quasi-Parish
  - San Roque de Navotas Parish
  - San Ildefonso Parish
  - Santa Cruz Parish
- Parañaque
  - El Shaddai House of Prayer
  - Holy Eucharist Parish Church (Moonwalk)
  - Holy Infant Jesus Parish Church (South Admiral)
  - Jesus The Divine Healer Parish Church (Tahanan Village)
  - Mary Help of Christians National Shrine (Better Living)
  - Mary Immaculate Parish Church (Levitown)
  - Mary Queen of Apostles Parish (San Antonio Valley 12)
  - Our Lady of Beautiful Love Parish (Merville Park)
  - Our Lady of the Most Holy Rosary Parish (Multinational Village)
  - Our Lady of the Most Holy Rosary Parish (Sun Valley)
  - Our Lady of Unity Parish Church
  - Our Lady of Peace Parish Church (4th Estate)
  - Presentation of The Child Jesus Parish Church (BF Homes)
  - Resurrection of Our Lord Parish Church (BF Homes)
  - San Antonio de Padua Parish Church (San Antonio Valley)
  - San Agustin Parish Church (Moonwalk)
  - Santo Niño Parish Church (Sto. Niño)
  - San Martin del Porres Parish Church (San Martin de Porres)
  - Santo Rita de Cascia Parish Church (Baclaran)
  - St. Joseph Parish Church (Tambo)
- Pasay (Vicariate of Santa Clara de Montefalco, Archdiocese of Manila)
  - Archdiocesan Shrine of Jesus the Way, the Truth and the Life (within SM Mall of Asia compound)
  - Our Lady of The Airways Parish Church (NAIA)
  - Mary Comforter of the Afflicted Parish Church (Maricaban)
  - San Juan Nepomuceno Parish (Malibay)
  - Our Lady of the Blessed Sacrament Parish Church (Kalayaan Village)
  - San Rafael Parish Church
  - San Roque Parish Church
  - Santa Clara de Montefalco Church
  - Santa Rita de Cascia Parish Church
  - San Isidro Labrador Parish Church
  - Our Lady of Fatima Parish Church
  - Our Lady of Sorrows Parish Church
- Pasig (Diocese of Pasig)
  - Vicariate of the Immaculate Conception
    - Immaculate Conception Cathedral-Parish
    - Holy Family Parish (Kapitolyo)
    - San Agustin Parish (Barangay Palatiw)
    - San Antonio Parish (Maybunga)
    - San Guillermo Parish (Buting)
    - San Sebastian Parish (Pinagbuhatan)
    - Sta. Clara de Montefalco Parish (Caniogan)
    - Santa Martha Parish (Kalawaan)
    - Santa Rosa de Lima (Bagong Ilog)
  - Vicariate of Sto. Tomas de Villanueva
    - Sto. Tomas de Villanueva Parish (Santolan)
    - Immaculate Conception Parish (Karangalan Village)
    - Sta. Lucia Parish (Manggahan)
    - Sto. Niño de Pasig Parish (Manggahan)
    - Sto. Rosario de Pasig Parish
    - St. Jude Thaddeus Parish (Sta. Lucia)
- Quezon City
  - Diocese of Cubao
    - Vicariate of the Holy Family
      - Holy Family Parish (Roxas)
      - Most Holy Redeemer Parish (Brixton Hill)
      - Our Lady of Fatima Parish (Don Manuel)
      - Saint Paul the Apostle Parish (Laging Handa)
    - Vicariate of Our Lady of Perpetual Help
      - Our Lady of Perpetual Help Parish
      - Christ the King Parish (Greenmeadows)
      - Nativity of Our Lord Parish
      - Our Lady of the Miraculous Medal Parish (Project 4)
      - San Roque Parish
      - St. John Paul II Parish (Eastwood)
      - Transfiguration of Our Lord Parish (Murphy)
    - Vicariate of Saint Joseph
      - Holy Cross Parish (Diliman)
      - Parish of the Lord of Divine Mercy (Sikatuna Village)
      - Holy Family Parish (Kamias)
      - Immaculate Heart of Mary Parish Church (Diliman)
      - Our Lady of Pentecost Parish Church (Loyola Heights)
      - Santa Maria della Strada Parish
      - San Isidro Labrador Parish
    - Vicariate of San Pedro Bautista
      - Immaculate Conception Parish Church (Damar Village)
      - Most Holy Rosary Parish (Masambong)
      - Santa Perpetua Parish Church (D. Tuazon)
      - Santa Teresita del Niño Jesus Parish Church
    - Vicariate of Sta. Rita de Cascia Parish
      - Santa Rita de Cascia Parish (Philam Homes)
      - Christ the King Parish (Project 7)
      - Parish of the Hearts of Jesus and Mary
      - Resurrection of Our Lord Parish Church (Paltok)
      - San Antonio de Padua Parish Church (San Francisco del Monte)
      - Santo Cristo de Bungad Parish Church (San Francisco del Monte)
      - Saint Jude Thaddeus Quasi-Parish Church (West Avenue)
    - Vicariate of Santo Niño
      - Santo Niño Shrine (Bago Bantay)
      - Holy Family Parish (GSIS Village)
      - Immaculate Conception Parish (Project 8)
      - Our Lady of Hope Parish Church (Pag-Asa)
      - Our Lady of Mount Carmel Parish Church (Project 6)
      - Our Lady of Perpetual Help Parish Church (Project 8)
      - Mary, The Immaculate Conception Parish Church (Project 6)
      - San Nicolas de Tolentino Parish
    - Chapels
      - Our Lady of the Most Holy Rosary Chapel (SM North EDSA)
      - Mary, Mother of Hope Chapel (Trinoma)
      - Chapel of St. Michael the Archangel (Trinoma)
      - St. Joseph Chapel (Ayala Malls Cloverleaf)
      - Sagrada Familia Chapel (Gateway Mall (Quezon City))
      - Capilla de San Lorenzo (Robinsons Magnolia)
      - Fishers of Men Chapel (Fisher Mall)
  - Christ The King Parish Church (Project 6)
  - Holy Family Quasi-Parish Church (Project 8)
  - Holy Spirit Parish Church (BF Homes)
  - Immaculate Conception Parish Church (Sangandaan)
  - Nativity of Our Lord Parish Church (Cubao)
  - Our Lady of Consolation Parish Church (Tandang Sora)
  - Our Lady of Fatima Parish Church (Don Manuel)
  - Our Lady of Mercy Parish Church (Novaliches)
  - Saint Peter Parish Church (Commonwealth)
  - San Lorenzo Ruiz Parish Church (Tierra Verde)
- San Juan
  - Mary The Queen Parish Church (Greenhills)
  - Chapel of the Holy Family (Greenhills)
  - Chapel of Our Lady of the Miraculous Medal (Cardinal Santos Medical Center)
- Taguig
  - Archdiocese of Manila (Vicariate of Our Lady of Guadalupe)
    - Mary, Mirror of Justice Parish Church (Comembo)
    - Mater Dolorosa Parish Church (East Rembo)
    - Santa Teresita Parish (West Rembo)
    - St. John of the Cross Parish (Pembo)
    - St. John Mary Vianney Parish (Cembo)
  - Diocese of Pasig
    - Vicariate of St. Anne
      - St. Ignatius of Loyola Parish (Ususan)
      - St. Michael Parish (Hagonoy)
      - St. Peter the Fisherman Parish (Napindan)
    - Vicariate of Sto. Niño
      - Sto. Niño de Taguig Parish (Signal Village)
      - Ina ng mga Dukha Parish (Western Bicutan)
      - Maria, Reyna ng mga Apostoles Parish (Pinagsama)
      - St. Michael the Archangel Parish (Bonifacio Global City)
        - St. Gabriel the Archangel Chapel (Uptown Mall)
        - St. Raphael the Archangel Chapel (Venice Grand Canal Mall)
      - Our Lady of the Holy Rosary Parish (Lower Bicutan)
      - St. Joseph Parish (Upper Bicutan)
      - Sagrada Familia Parish (Bagumbayan)
      - Our Mother of Perpetual Help Parish (Bagong Tanyag)
      - San Vicente Ferrer Parish (Pinagsama)
    - San Pedro Calungsod Chapel (SM Aura)
- Valenzuela
  - Holy Family Parish Church (Karuhatan)

== See also ==
- List of religious buildings in Metro Manila
- Baroque Churches of the Philippines
