= Mary Help of Christians Shrine (Philippines) =

Roman Catholic church in Parañaque, Philippines

- Minor Basilica and National Shrine of Mary Help of Christians Parish
- Basilika Menor, Pambansang Dambana, at Parokya ni Maria Mapag-ampon sa mga Kristiyano (Filipino)
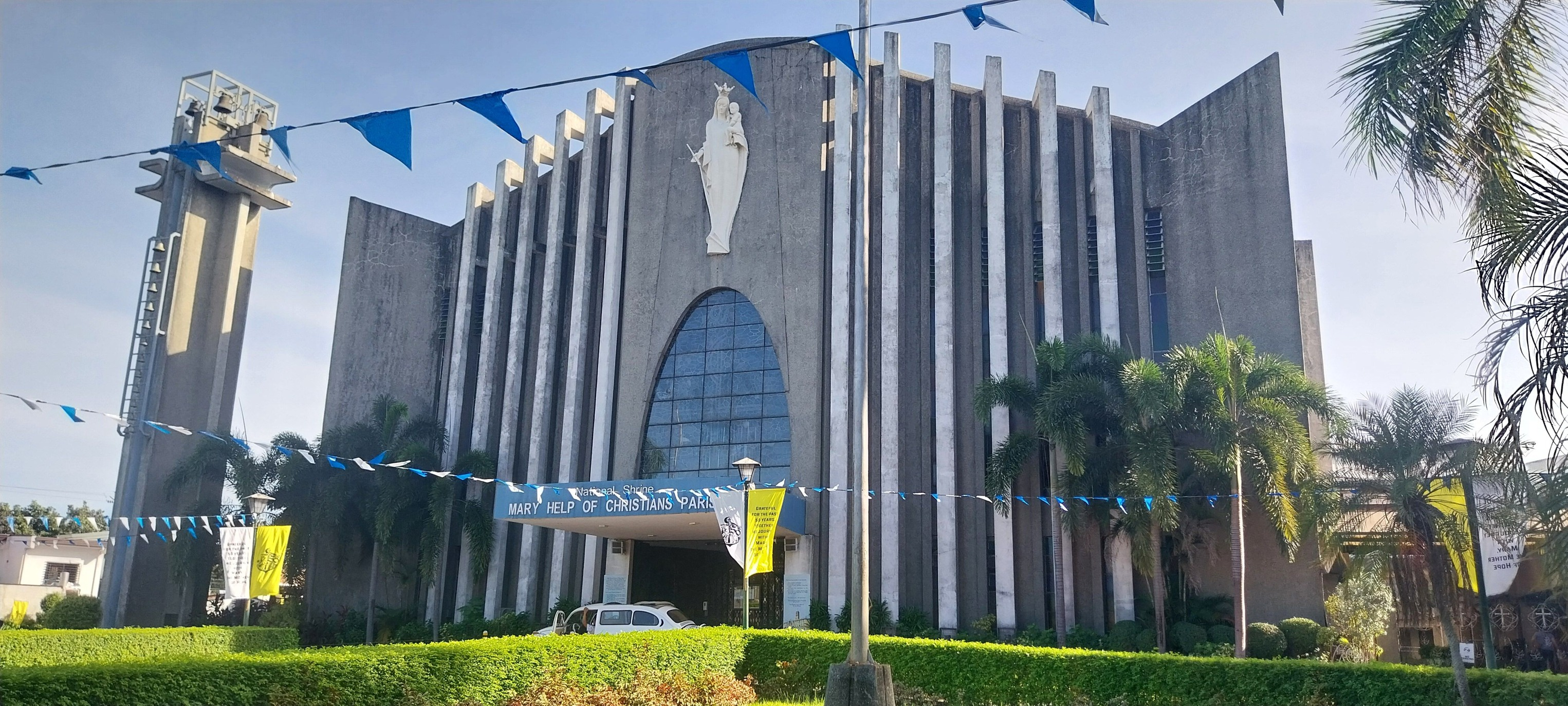
- Church façade in 2025

- Location in Metro Manila Location in Luzon Location in the Philippines
- 14.48196°N 121.02822°E
- Location: Parañaque, Metro Manila
- Country: Philippines
- Language(s): Filipino, English
- Denomination: Roman Catholic
- Religious institute: Salesians of Don Bosco
- Website: https://www.facebook.com/NSMHCParish

History
- Status: Minor basilica, national shrine, and parish
- Dedication: Mary Help of Christians
- Dedicated: December 4, 1976; 49 years ago
- Consecrated: December 4, 1976; 49 years ago

Architecture
- Functional status: Active
- Architectural type: Church
- Style: Brutalist
- Years built: 1972-1975
- Groundbreaking: May 24, 1972; 54 years ago
- Completed: July 24, 1975; 51 years ago

Specifications
- Materials: Steel, cement, galvanized iron

Administration
- Province: Manila
- Diocese: Parañaque
- Deanery: St. Martin de Porres
- Parish: Mary Help of Christians

Clergy
- Rector: Fr. Regulus M. Porlucas, SDB
- Pastor(s): Fr. Regulus M. Porlucas, SDB

The Minor Basilica and National Shrine of Mary Help of Christians Parish, also known as Mary Help of Christians Shrine, is a Roman Catholic basilica, national shrine, and parish located in Barangay Don Bosco, Parañaque, Philippines. It is under the jurisdiction of the Diocese of Parañaque, and is dedicated to Mary Help of Christians.

== History ==
The devotion to Mary Help of Christians in the Philippines began in 1922 with the appointment of Salesian Archbishop Guglielmo Piani as Apostolic Delegate to the Philippines. Upon his arrival, Piani brought with him an image of Mary Help of Christians, which was first enthroned at the Manila Cathedral.

During World War II in 1942, the image of Mary Help of Christians was transferred to the Our Lady of Loreto Church for safekeeping. The image remained in the church for several decades before its transfer to the National Shrine in Parañaque in 1994.

Construction of the present church building began in 1972 and was completed in 1975, the same year the Parish of Mary Help of Christians was formally established. The church was consecrated in December 1976. On August 15, 1985, the Catholic Bishops' Conference of the Philippines, led by Archbishop Antonio Mabutas, approved the parish the status of a national shrine, with the official proclamation done on August 24, 1985.

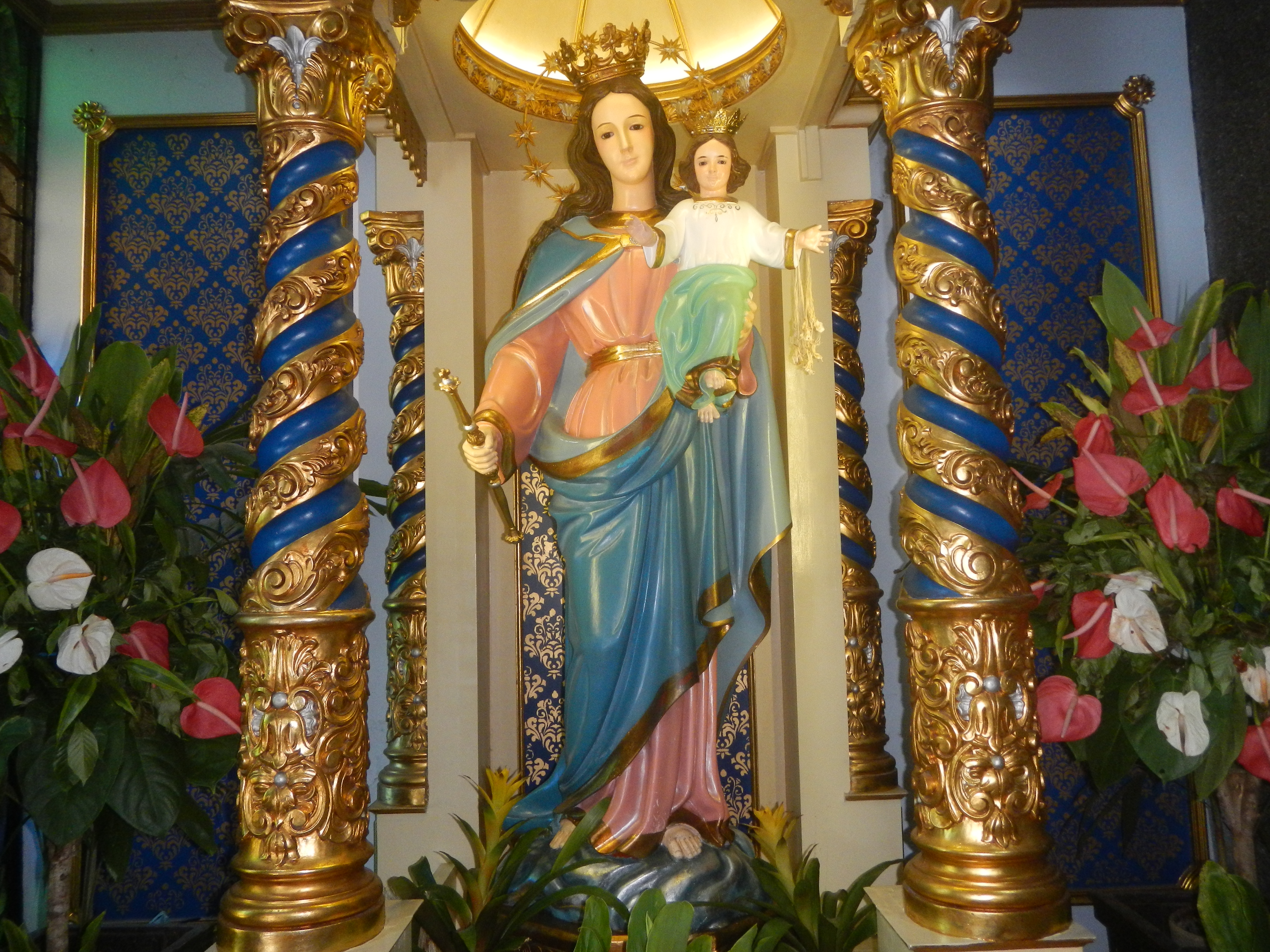
The Maximo Vicente image at the narthex in 2018

The enshrined image of Mary Help of Christians received the canonical coronation on her feast day, May 24, 2022, led by Cardinal Jose Advincula, archbishop of Manila.

Pope Francis elevated the national shrine into a minor basilica on March 27, 2025 and was solemnly declared on December 8, 2025, making it the first basilica in the diocese of Parañaque.

== Architecture ==
The church facade is designed with a Brutalist style, and composed of concrete fins arranged symmetrically, dividing the facade into narrow sections with colored-glass window openings. A large parabolic stained glass window can be seen above the main entrance, with a statue of Mary, Help of Christians and the basilica's coat of arms above the parabolic window. The bell tower is detached from the main building.

The interior, on the other hand, is an eclectic mix of architectural styles ranging from the Baroque Altar and Reredos to Brutalist walls with sanctuary pillar bas reliefs inspired by Egyptian mural art.

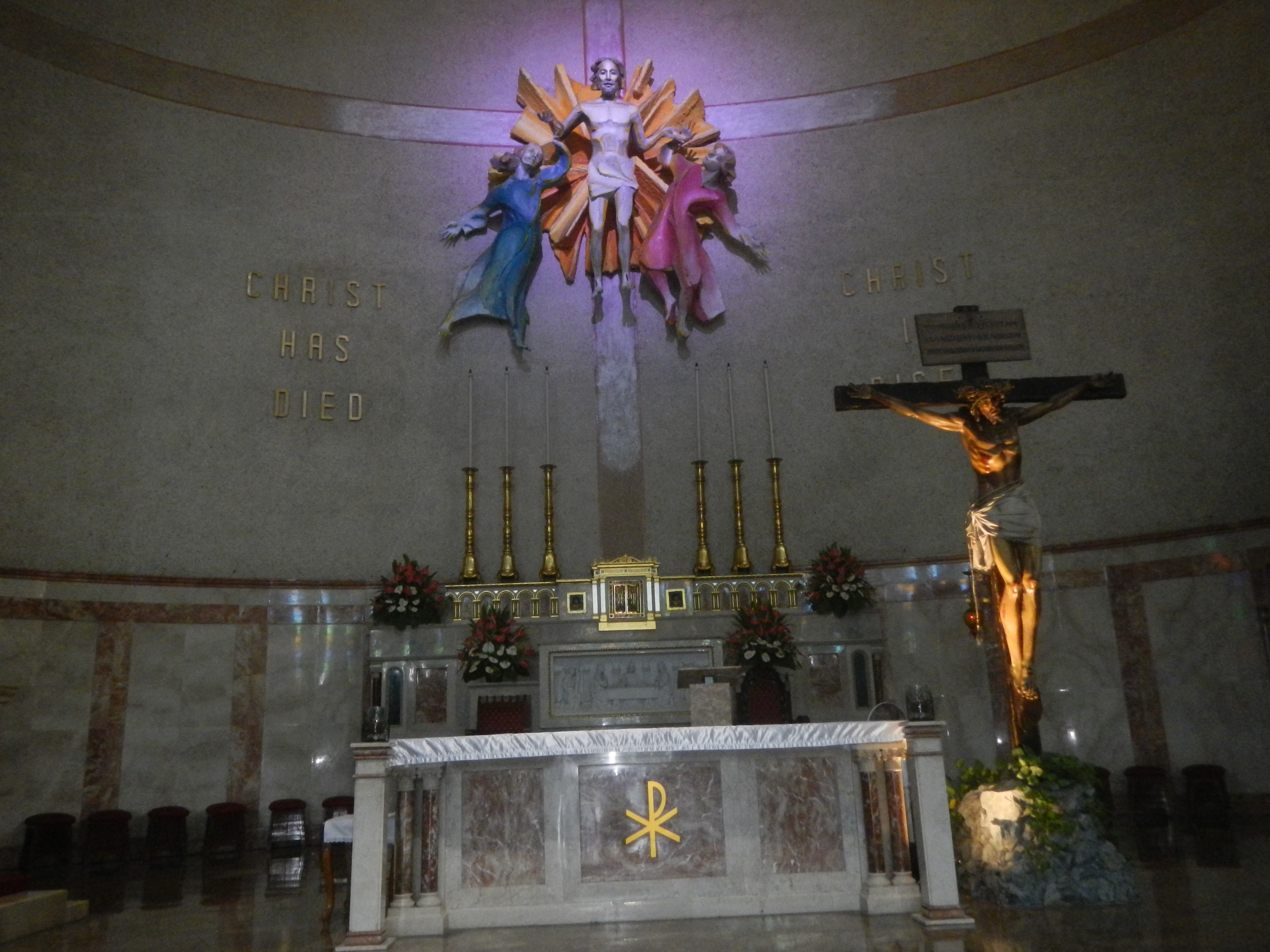
Altar

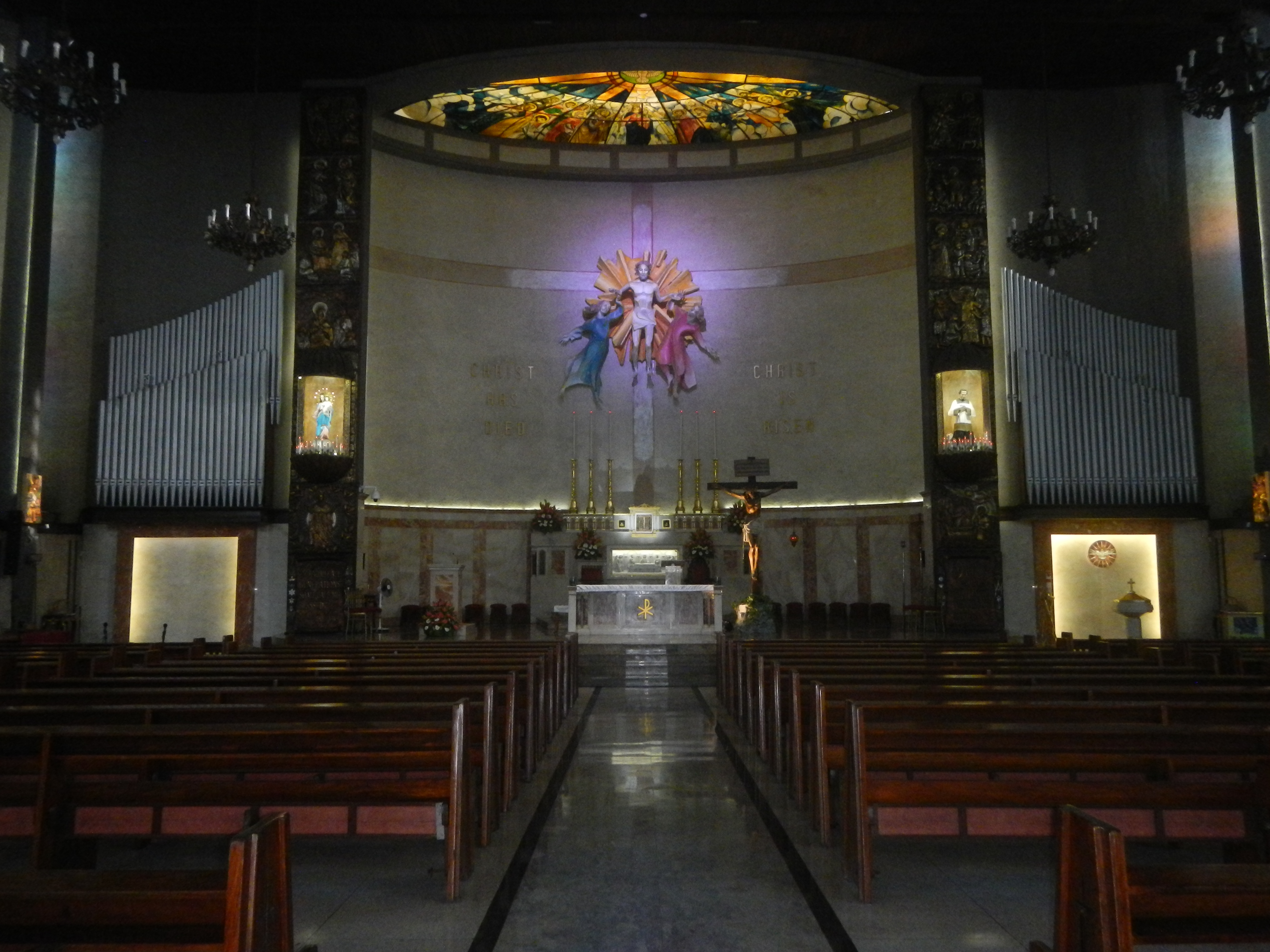
The nave of the church

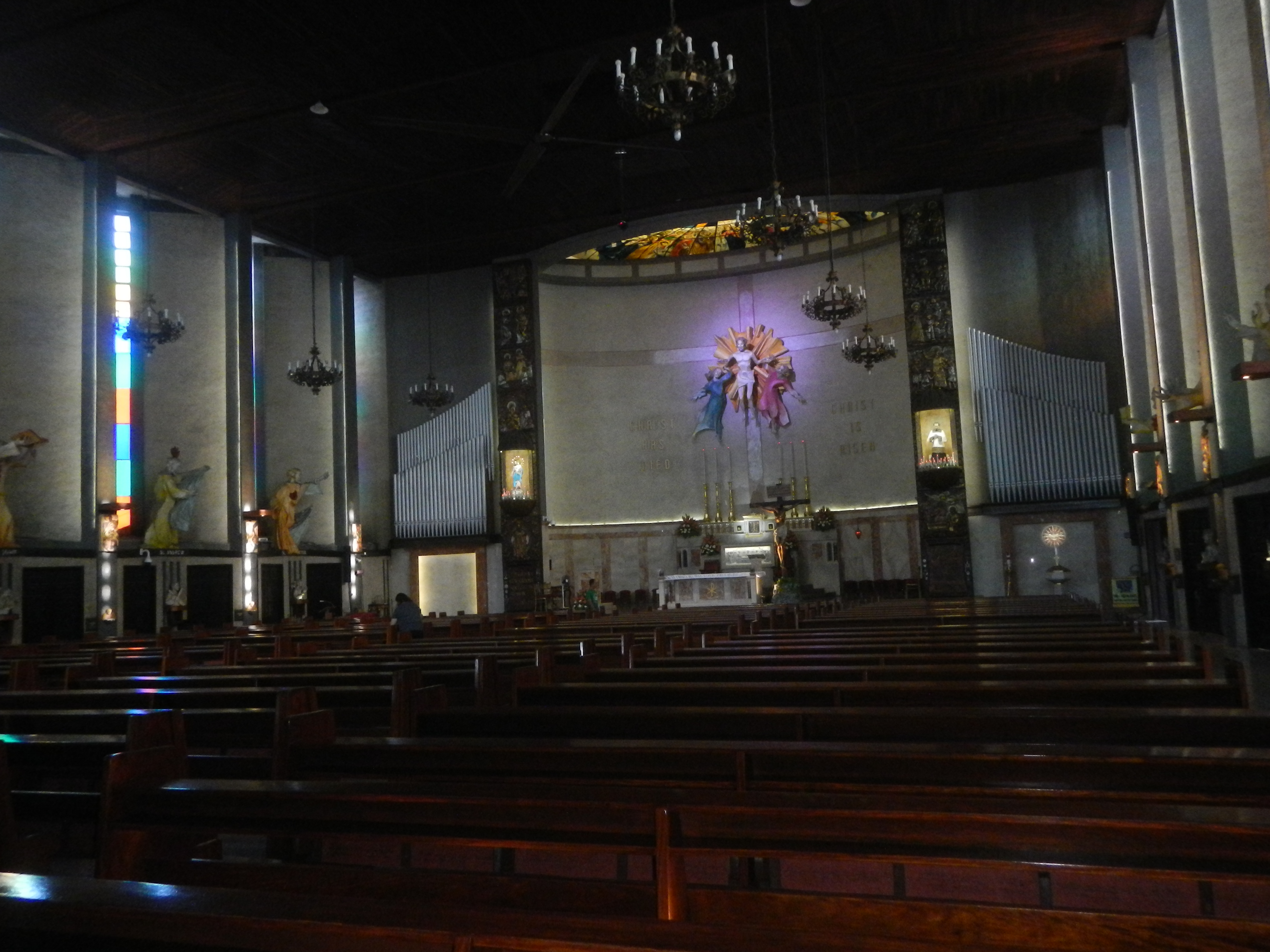
The church's interior

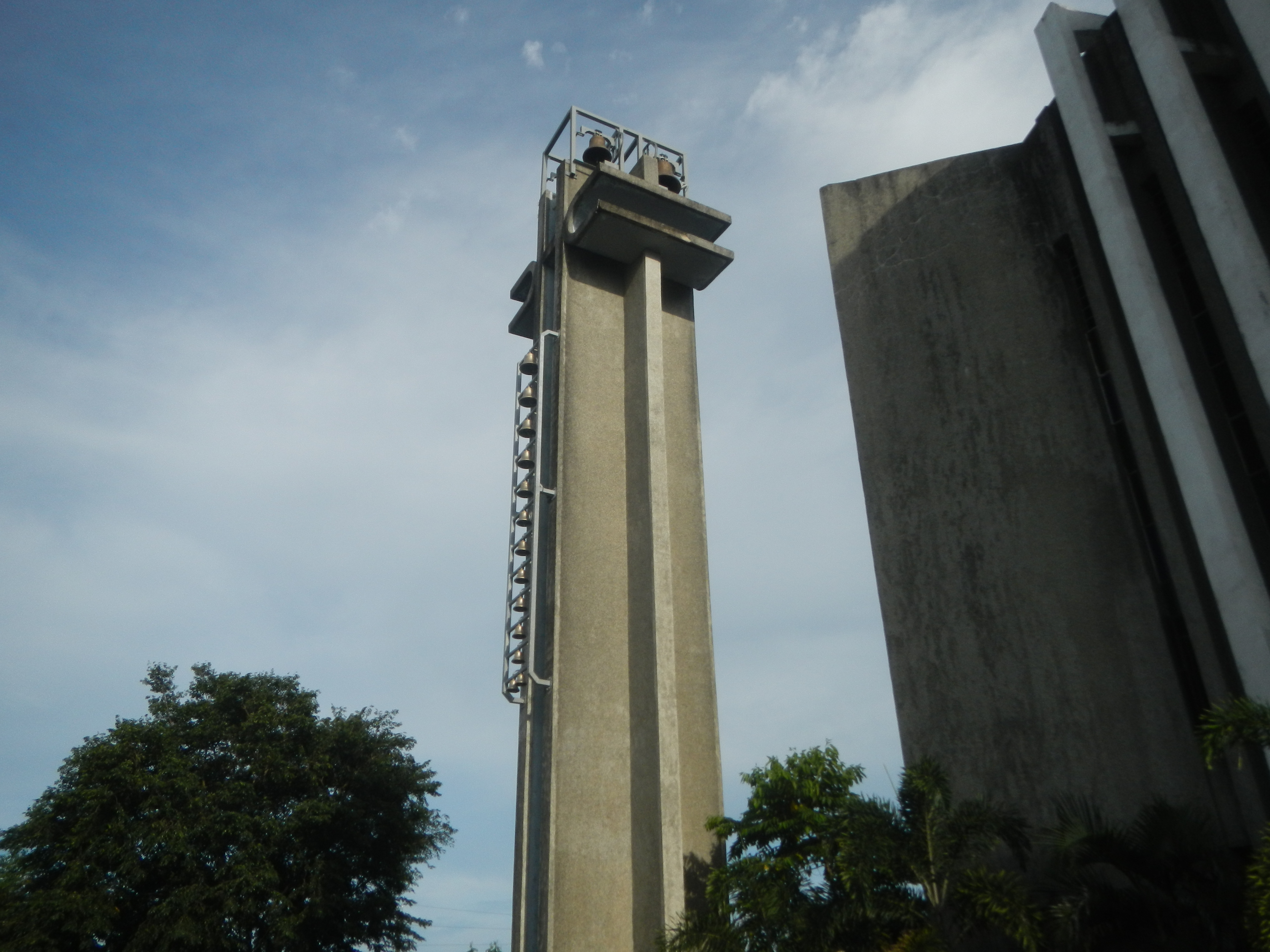
Belfry

== See also ==
- Roman Catholic Diocese of Parañaque
- Mary, Help of Christians
- List of Catholic basilicas
- List of Roman Catholic churches in Metro Manila
