= Kambal na Krus Chapel =

Roman Catholic chapel in Manila, Philippines

- Capilla de las Cruces Gemelas (Spanish); Kapilya ng Kambál na Krus (Filipino)
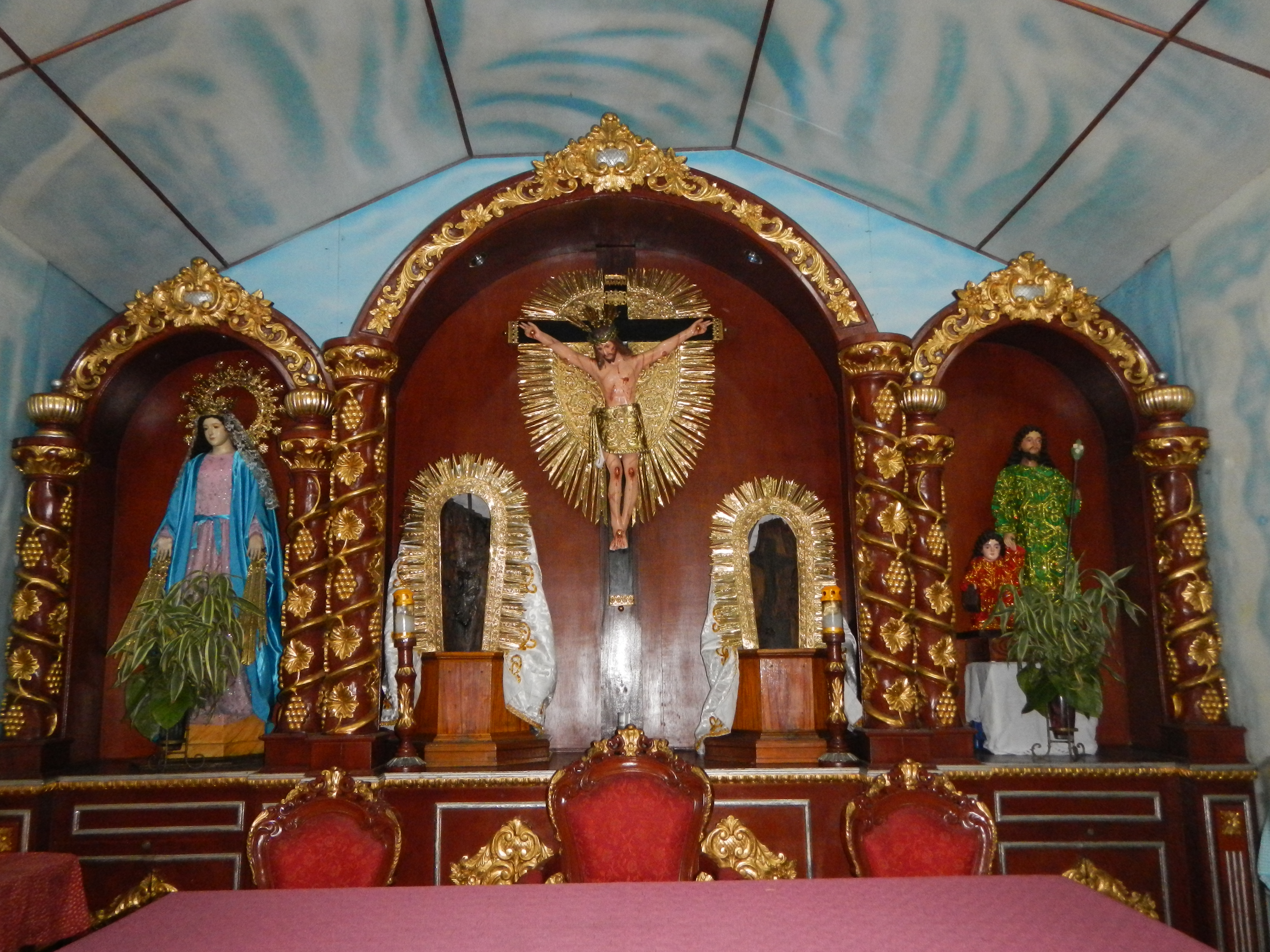
- Altar showing the Twin Crosses on either side of the crucifix
- Kambal na Krus Chapel
- 14°37′13″N 120°58′16″E
- Location: Raxabago Street, Tondo, City of Manila, Philippines
- Denomination: Roman Catholic
- Website: www.facebook.com/pages/Kambal-Na-Krus-Chapel/

Administration
- Archdiocese: Archdiocese of Manila

The Chapel of Kambál na Krus ("Twin Crosses") is a Catholic visita along Raxabago Street, Tondo, Manila, Philippines. The chapel is under the jurisdiction of Saint Joseph de Gagalangin Parish of the Archdiocese of Manila, and covers six barangays. Its feast day is on the third Sunday of March.

== History ==
On March 23, 1922, a young labourer named Crispino Lacandaso was chopping wood from a felled, hundred year-old sampalok (Tamarindus indica) tree on an empty lot at 1885 Juan Luna Street, Gagalangin, Manila. Lacandaso initially had difficulty cutting the trunk, but upon finally cleaving in twain, he saw a dark cross on a base, imprinted on both halves of the wood. The pieces of wood were subsequently encased in glass, and devotees from other parts of the city flocked to the site, and a small chapel was later built to enshrine the wood.

=== Renovations ===
The 2009 renovation completely altered the chapel, adding a second altar and two more floors to the structure. On the second floor is the new choir loft, while a rooftop area and bellcote are on the third. The altar was also overhauled, and the chapel received a new set of liturgical vessels.

In 2013, the façade of the first storey was redesigned to appear as though it was built in the 19th century. The two crosses outside changed into a wooden cross, while the wall was changed into adobe.

== Devotion ==
During the fiesta, many people go to the chapel to venerate the crosses, showing gratitude for the past year's blessings. On Maundy Thursday, many people from provinces and other cities in Metro Manila select the chapel as a station as they perform the traditional Visita Iglesia pilgrimage.

=== Feast ===
The anniversary of the finding of the Twin Crosses is on 23 March, and it is commemorated locally on the third Sunday of March. A triduum of Masses precedes the feast day itself, when two Masses are celebrated in the morning and in the afternoon, followed by a procession. The fiesta also celebrates the alleged miraculous properties of the Twin Crosses.

The centennial of the finding of the Twin Crosses was held on March 23, 2022. A Pontifical Mass was said by Apostolic Nuncio to the Philippines Archbishop Charles John Brown. The fiesta had begun earlier on March 20 with a Pontifical Mass presided over by Cardinal José F. Advincula, Archbishop of Manila, concelebrated by parish priest Rev. Fr. Joselino B. Tuazon, Rev. Fr. Rowen Z. Carlos, CM, and Rev. Fr. Marlon M. Reyes, SSS.

== Gallery ==
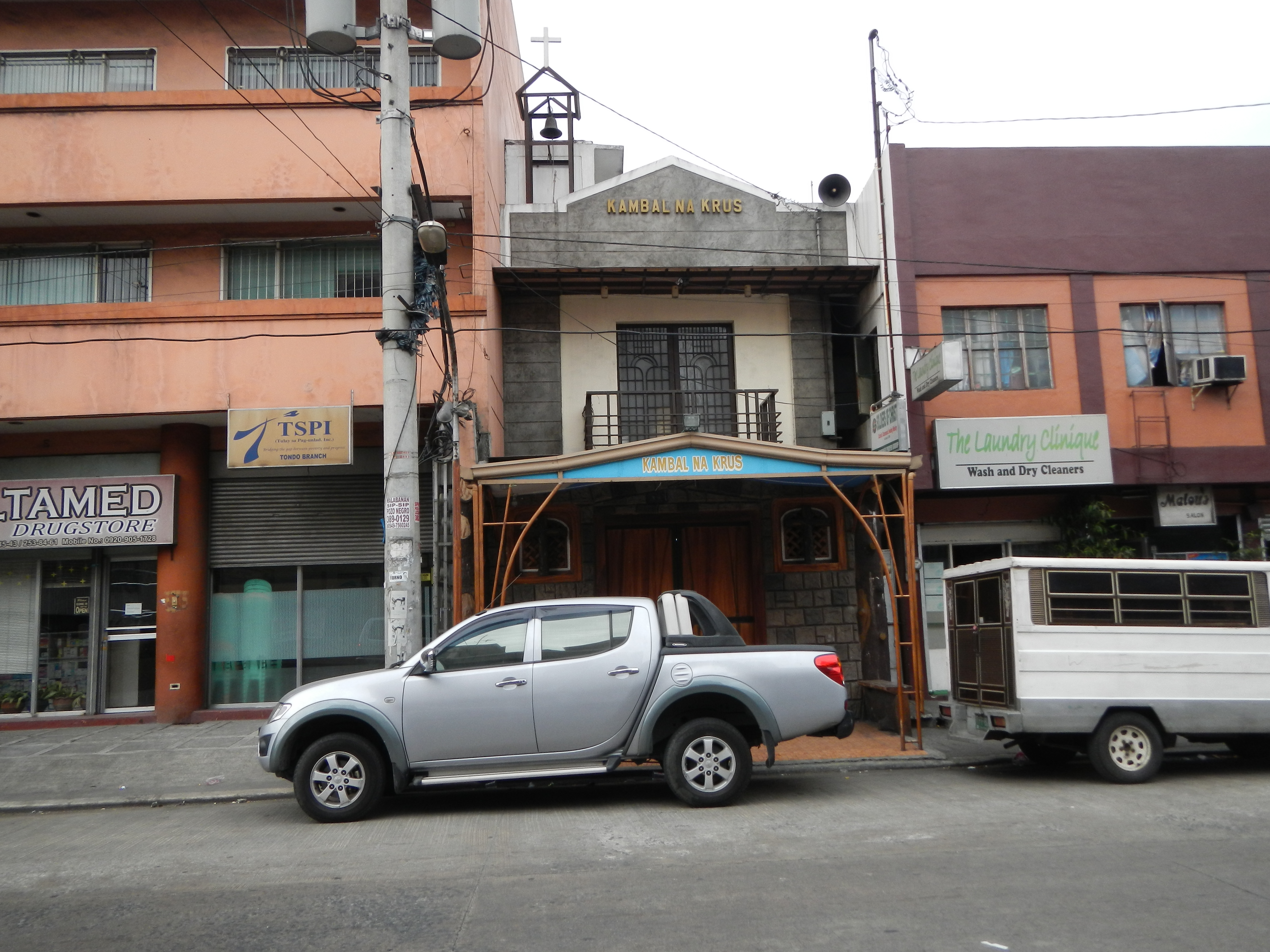
Chapel façade, showing Raxabago Street

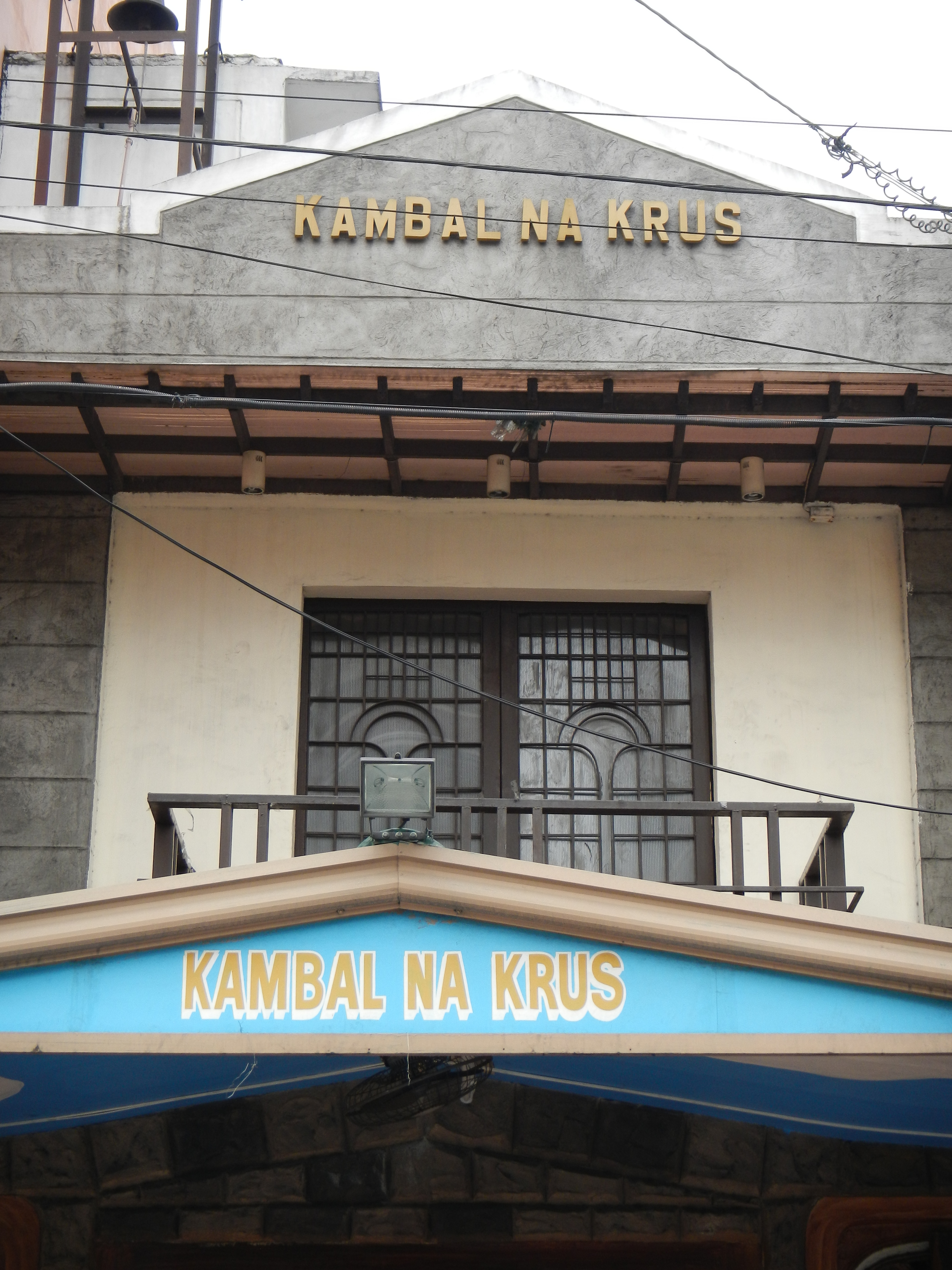
Closeup of the façade

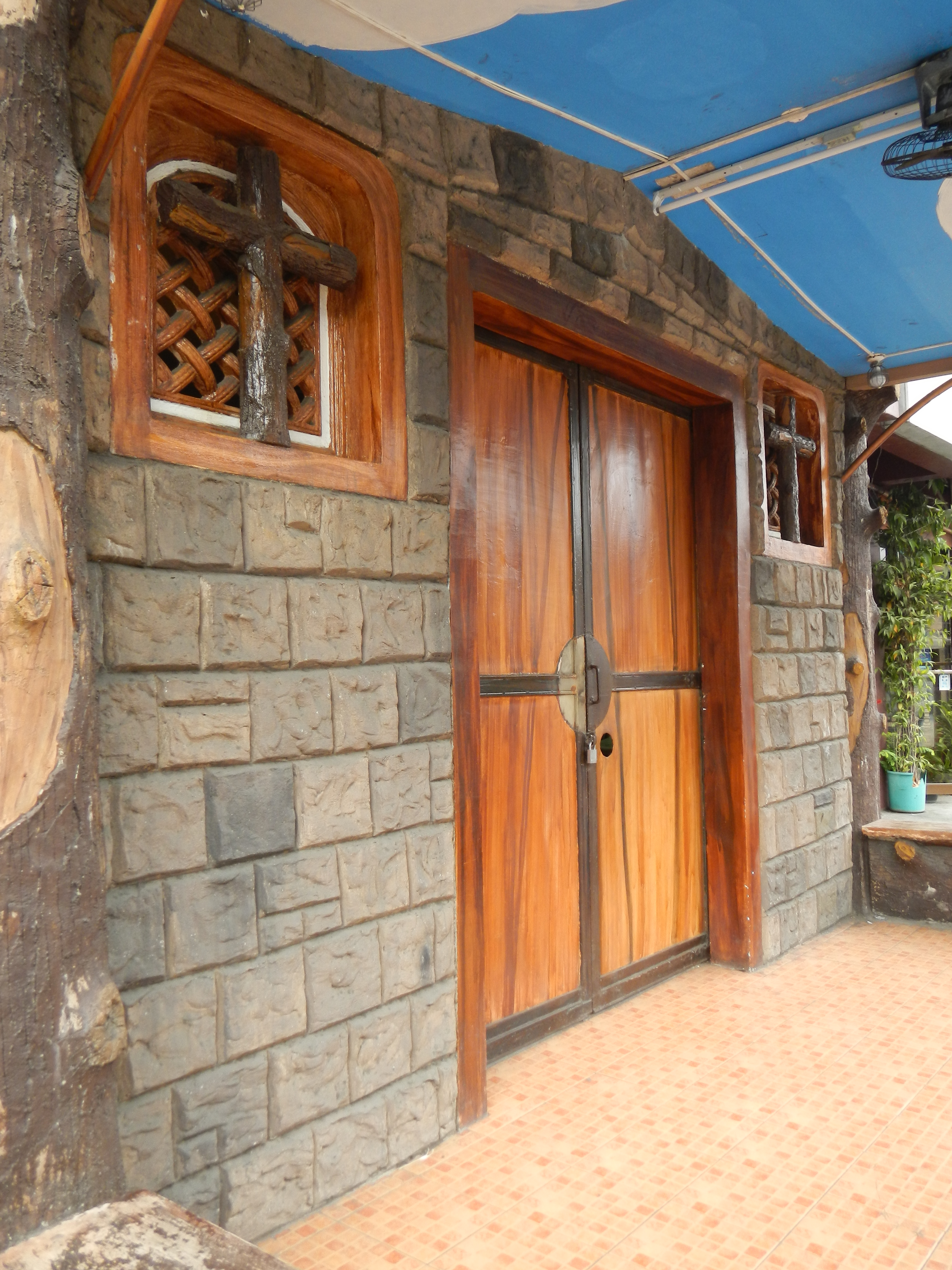
Entrance doors

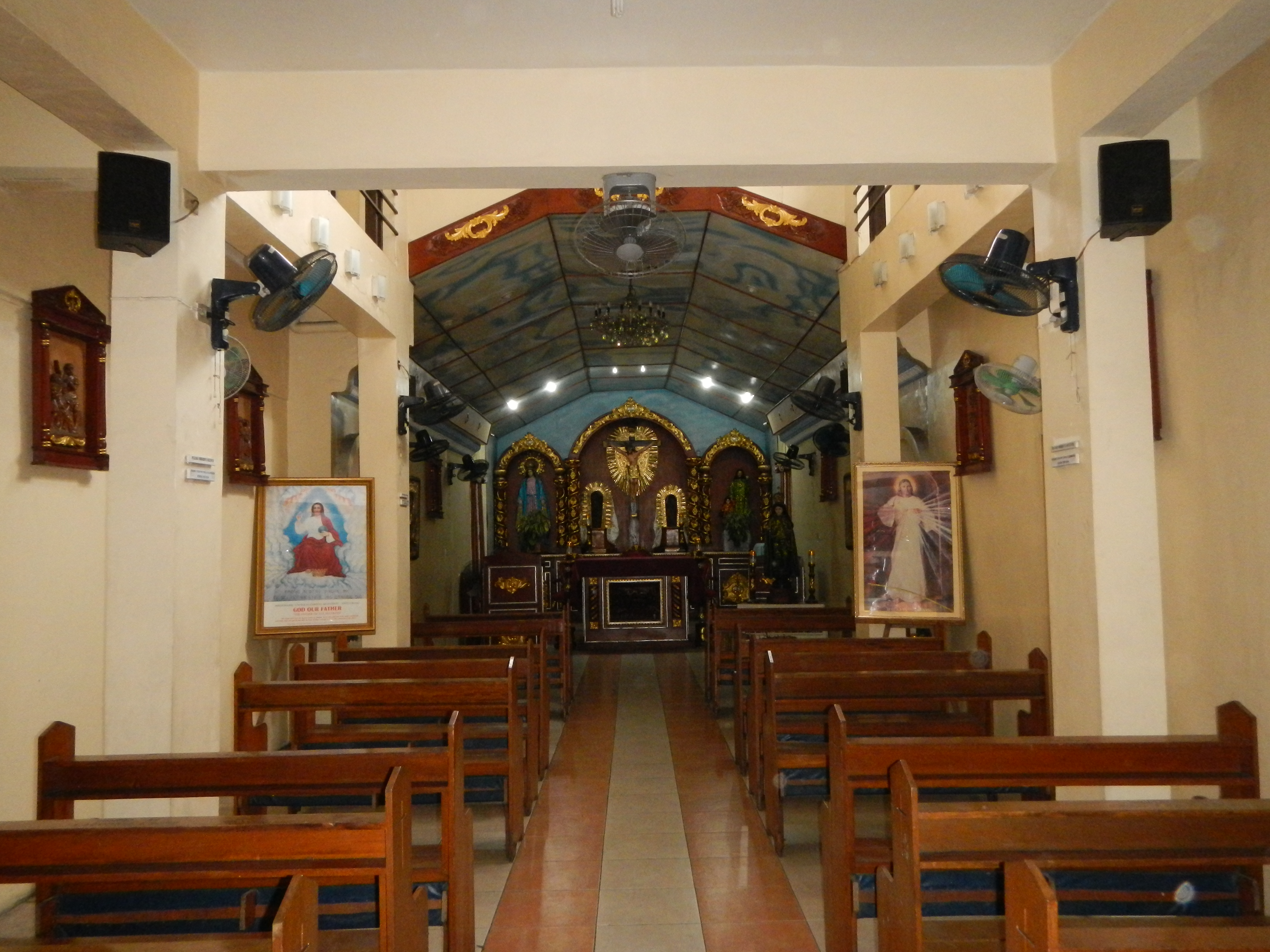
View from the narthex

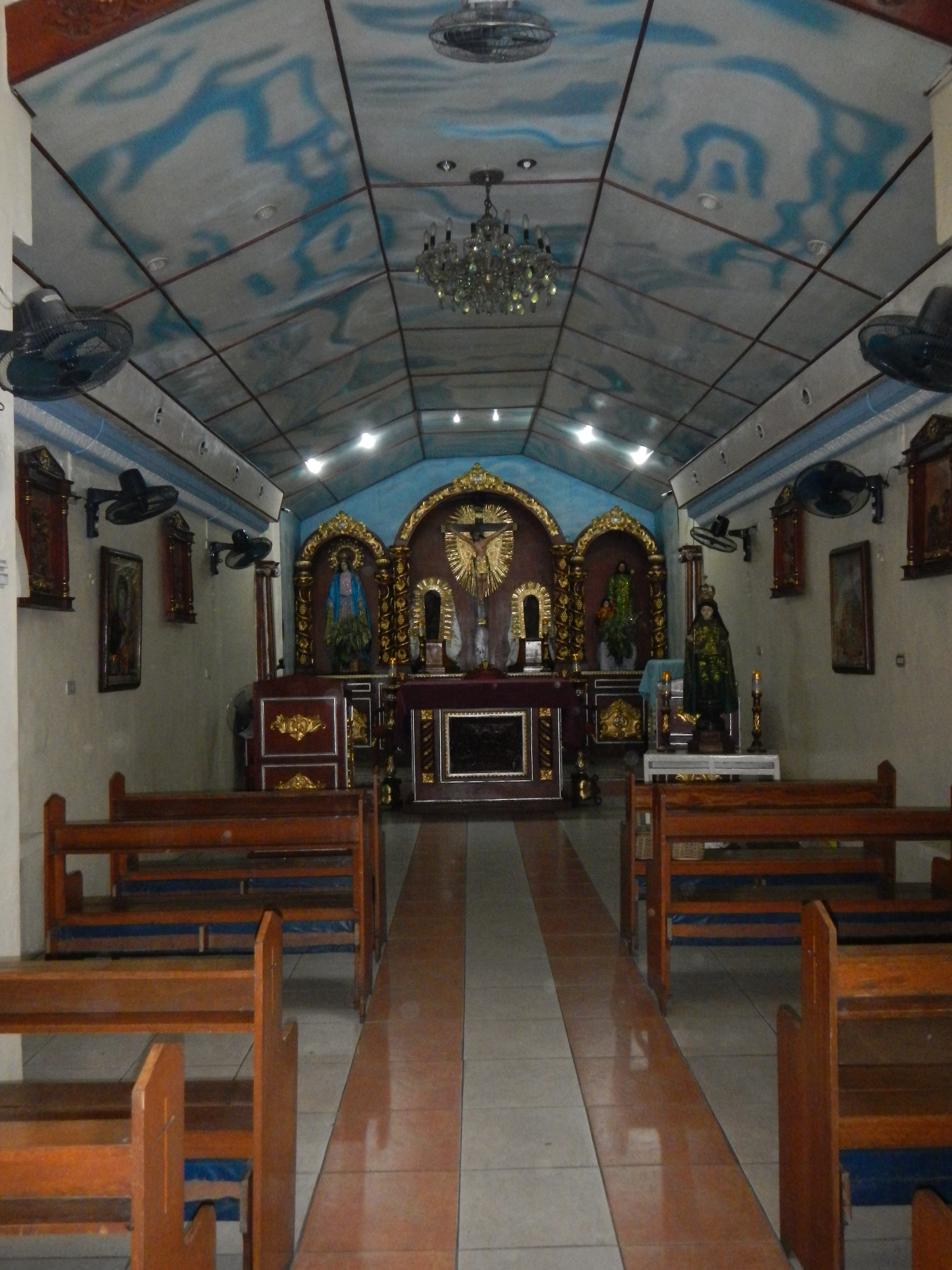
Interior, showing the nave and altar (2014)

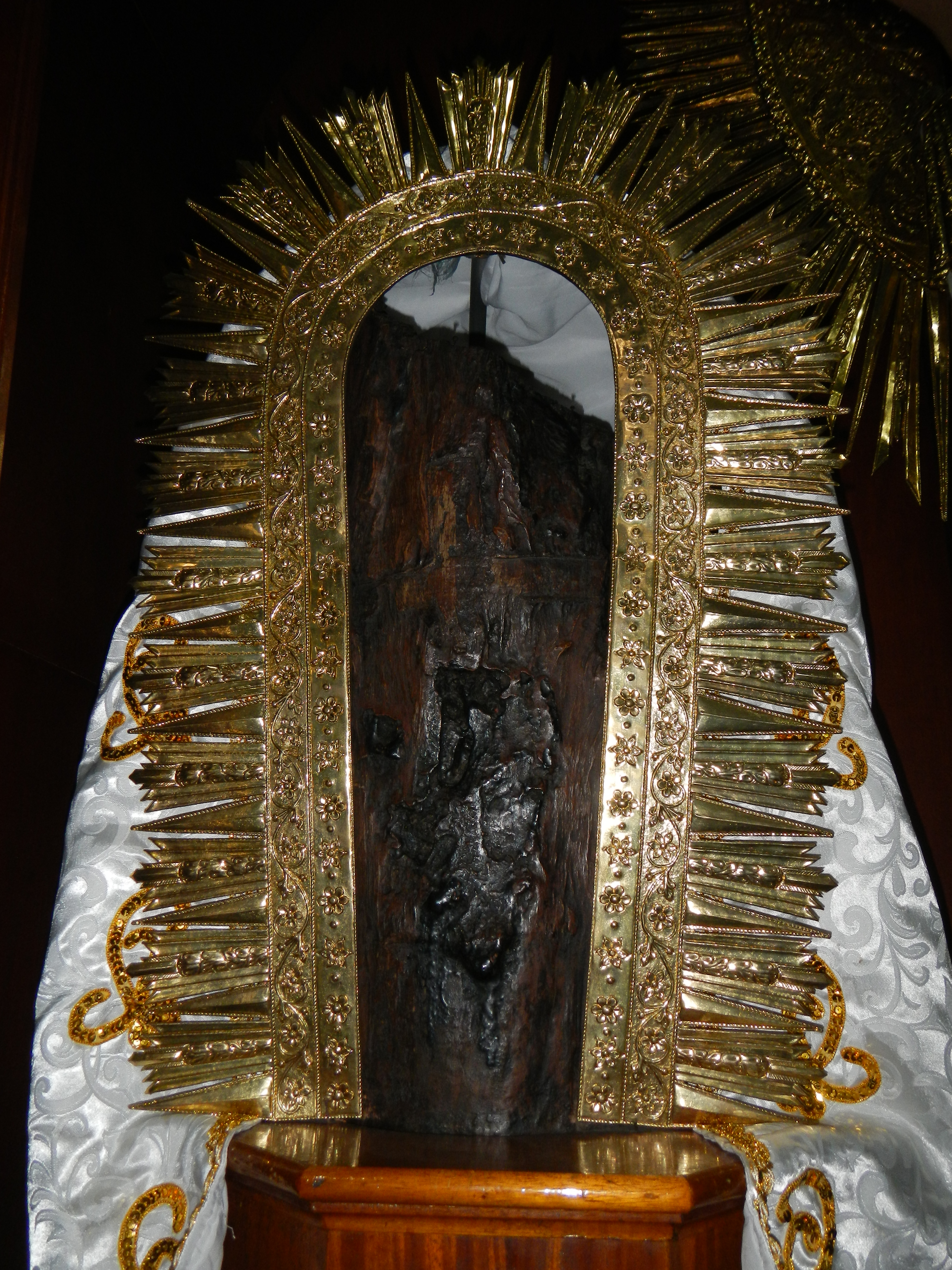
The slightly larger half of the centuries-old tamarind wood

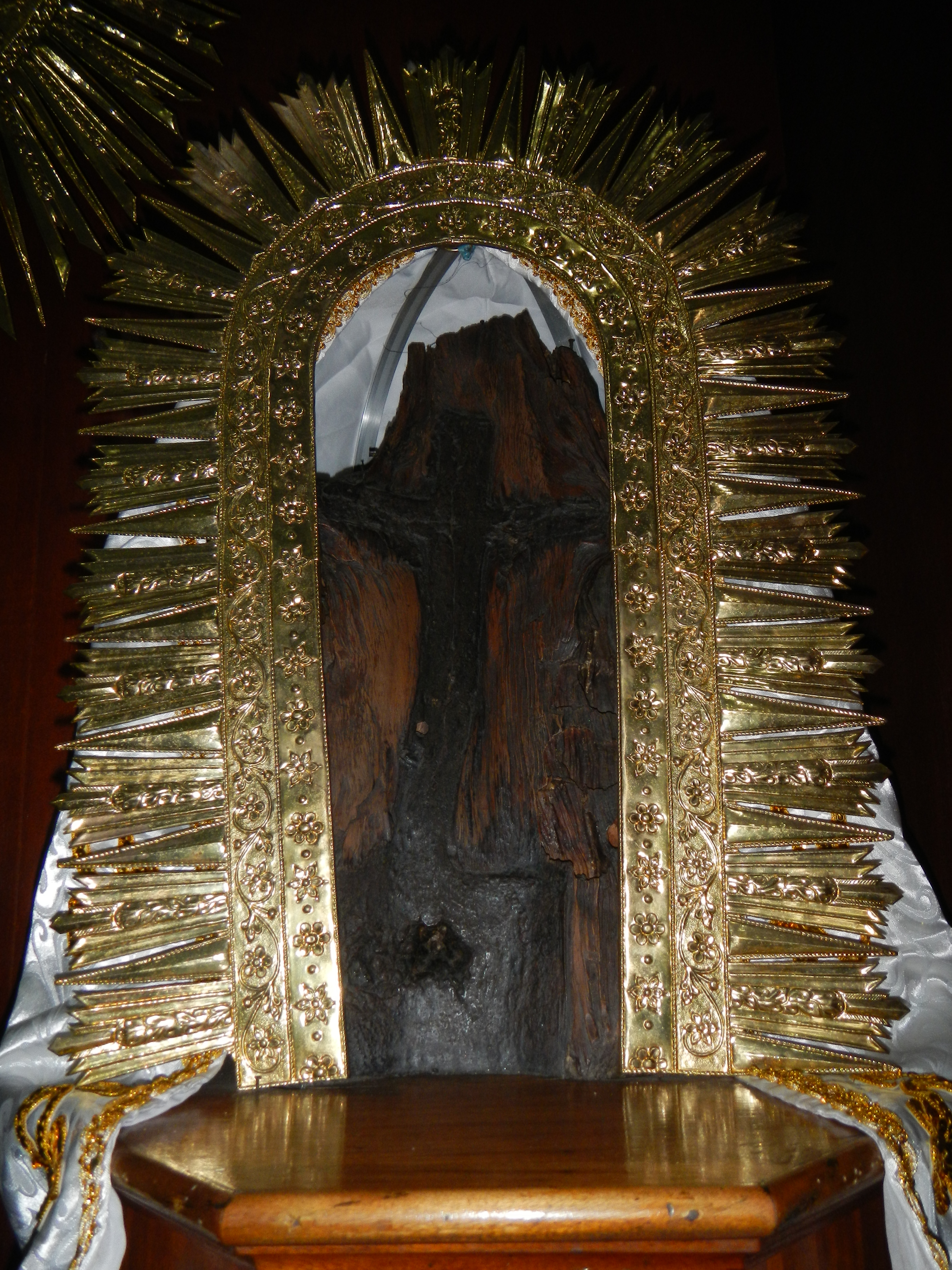
The other half, with a white manto behind the rostrillo (sunburst halo)
