= Pateros Church =

Roman Catholic church in Pateros, Philippines

- San Roque Parish Church; Diocesan Shrine of Saint Martha
- Dambanang Pangdiyosesis ni Santa Marta (Tagalog); Simbahang Parokya ni San Roque (Tagalog); Iglesia Parroquia San Roque (Spanish); Parroquia Diocesana de Santa Marta (Spanish)
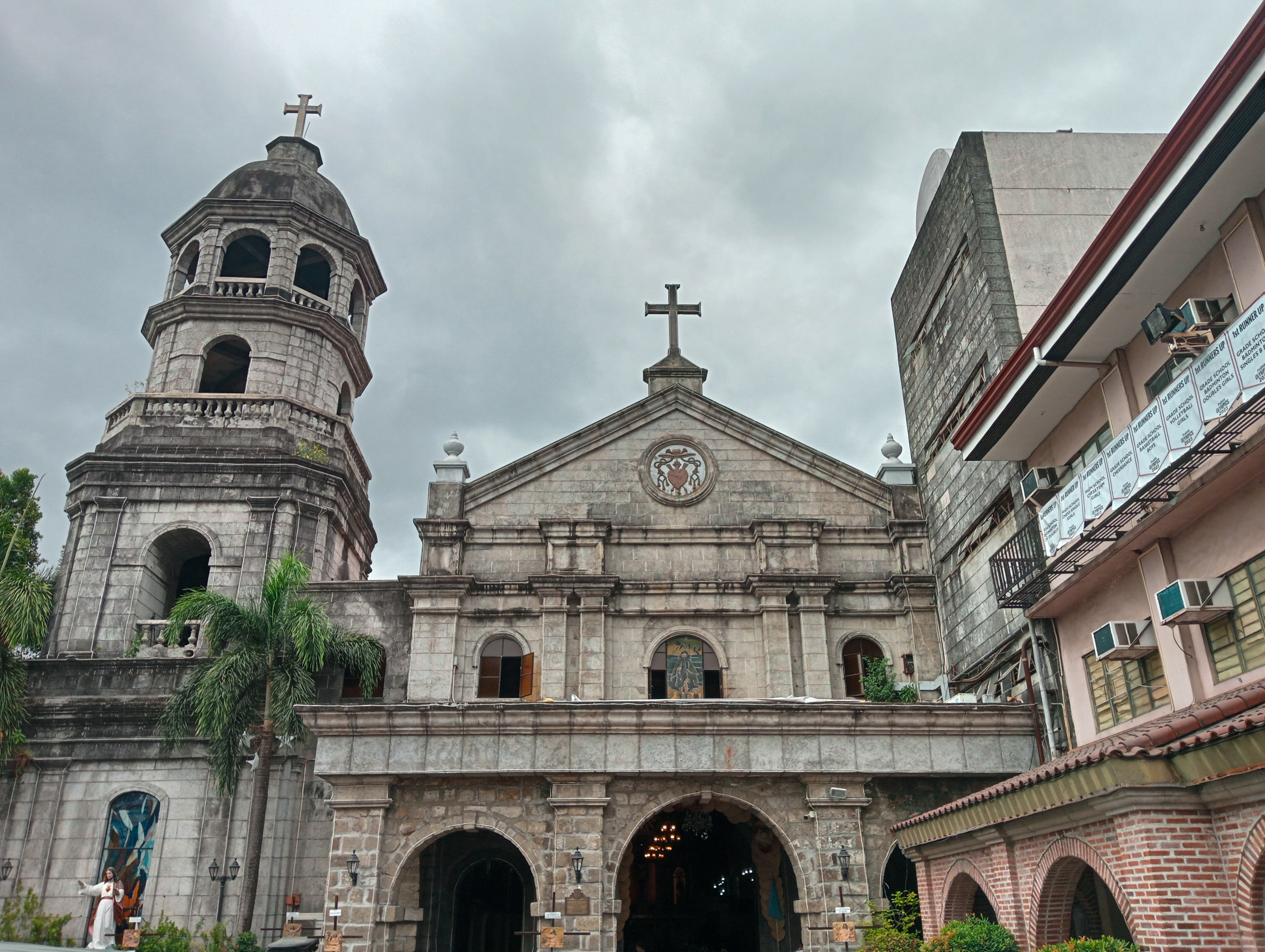
- Church facade in 2024
- Pateros Church
- 14°32′42″N 121°04′01″E
- Location: B. Morcilla St., Pateros, Metro Manila
- Country: Philippines
- Denomination: Roman Catholic
- Website: www.dssm-srppateros.org

History
- Founded: August 16, 1815
- Founder: Fray Andres Vehil
- Dedication: St. Roch
- Consecrated: August 16, 1815
- Events: 200 years anniversary

Architecture
- Functional status: Active
- Architect: Fray Santos Gomez Marañon
- Architectural type: Church building
- Style: Baroque
- Groundbreaking: July 1, 1816
- Completed: August 16, 1816

Specifications
- Materials: Stones

Administration
- Diocese: Pasig

Clergy
- Bishop: Bishop Mylo Hubert Claudio Vergara
- Priest(s): Rev. Fr. Loreto "Jhun" Sanchez, Jr.

San Roque Parish Church, also known as the Diocesan Shrine of Santa Marta and commonly known as Pateros Church (Filipino: Simbahan ng Pateros), is a Roman Catholic church under the order of the Augustinians located in the municipality of Pateros, Metro Manila, Philippines. It is under the jurisdiction of the Diocese of Pasig.

== History ==
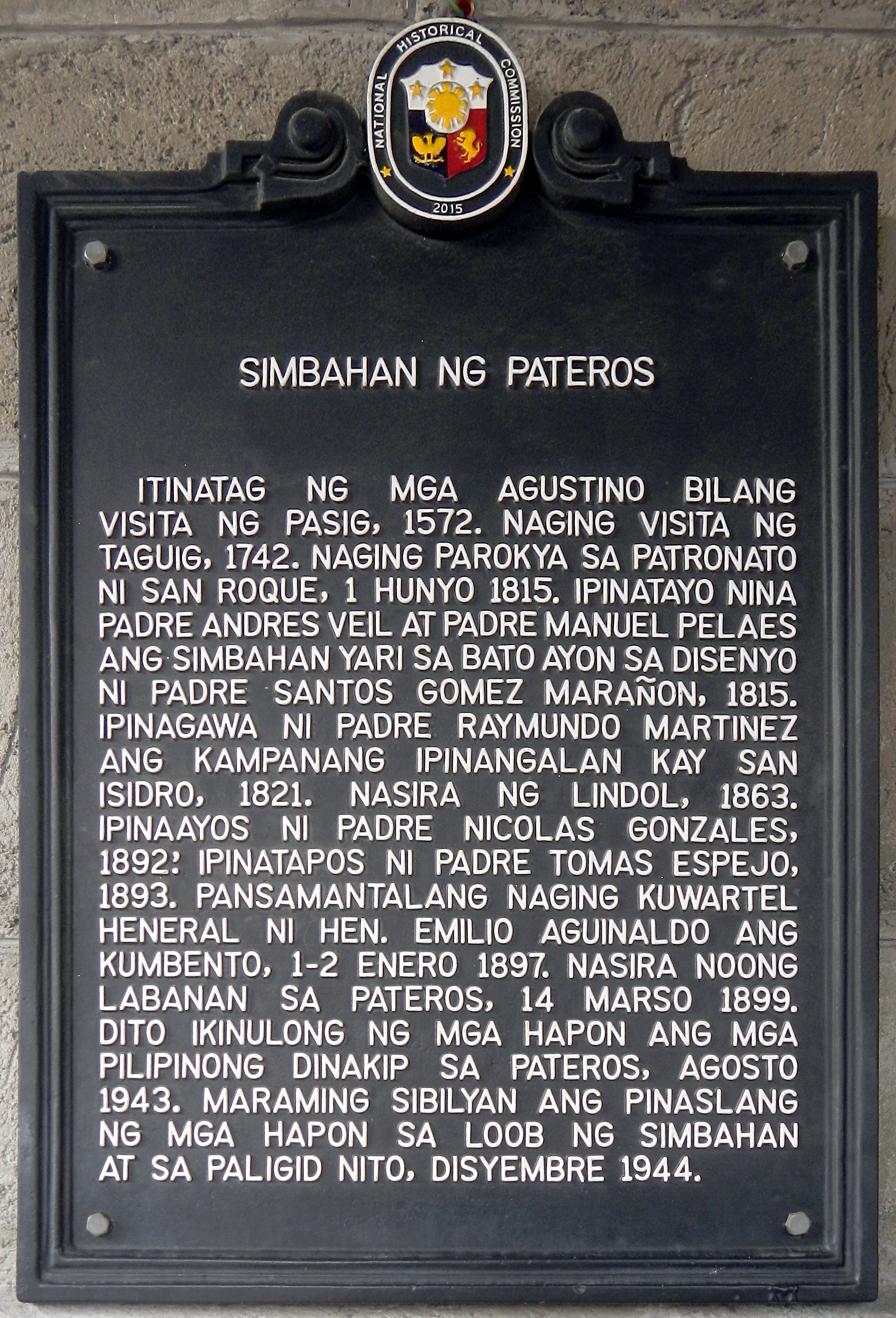
Church NHC historical marker installed in 2015

=== 19th century ===
Pateros Church was founded after the division of Pateros to Pasig by Fray Andres Vehil and Fr. Manuel Pelaes on June 1, 1815. In 1863, an earthquake damaged and destroyed the church. Renovation of the church was completed in 1893 under Fr. Tomas Espejo. The church was destroyed for the second time in the midst of the Philippine Revolution during the Battle of Pateros on March 14, 1899, resulting in the loss of its records.

=== 20th century ===
During World War II, families of the civilians who were arrested, were taken to the church, which served as a prison. In December 1944, Japanese soldiers killed many civilians inside the church. Also, its records were destroyed in the process once again. After the war, the people of Pateros and the church rose again.

=== Contemporary history ===
On August 21, 2003, the church was placed under the jurisdiction of the newly-established Diocese of Pasig. On February 7, 2009, following a petition filed last year by Rev. Fr. Orlando B. Cantillon and the Poderes de Santa Marta de Pateros to then-Bishop Francisco San Diego, it was officially conferred and recognized as a Diocesan Shrine.

In 2015, under the leadership of Rev. Fr. Roy Rosales, San Roque Parish celebrated its 200th anniversary.

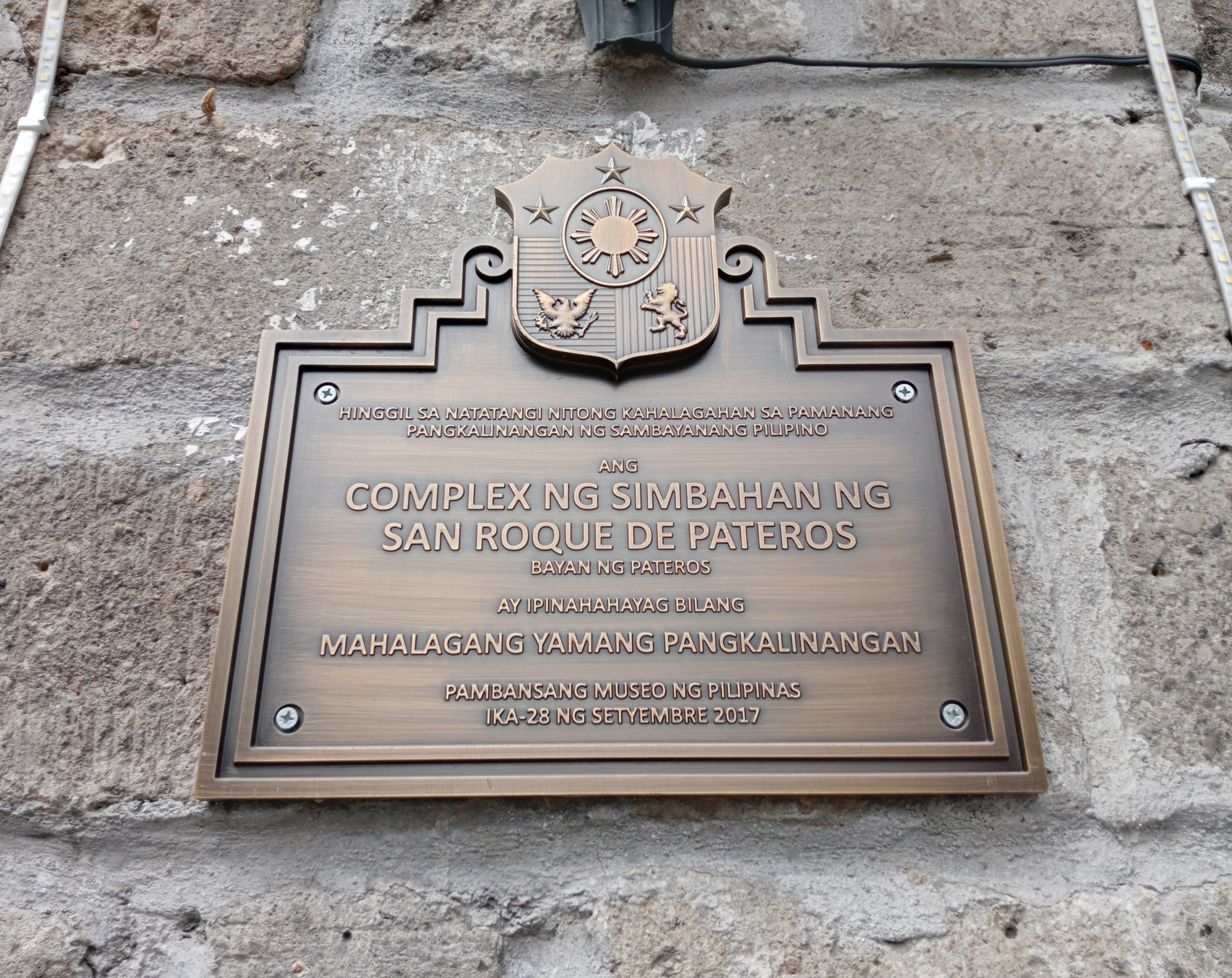
Church Important Cultural Property marker installed in 2023

On July 29, 2023, the church, including its shrine, was declared an Important Cultural Property by the National Museum.

== Architecture ==
The parish was built by Fray Andres Vehil and Fr. Don Manuel Pelaes using a stone design planned and created by Fray Santos Gomez Marañon. They started building the parish, completing it on July 1, 1815, with the San Isidro Bell built in 1821.

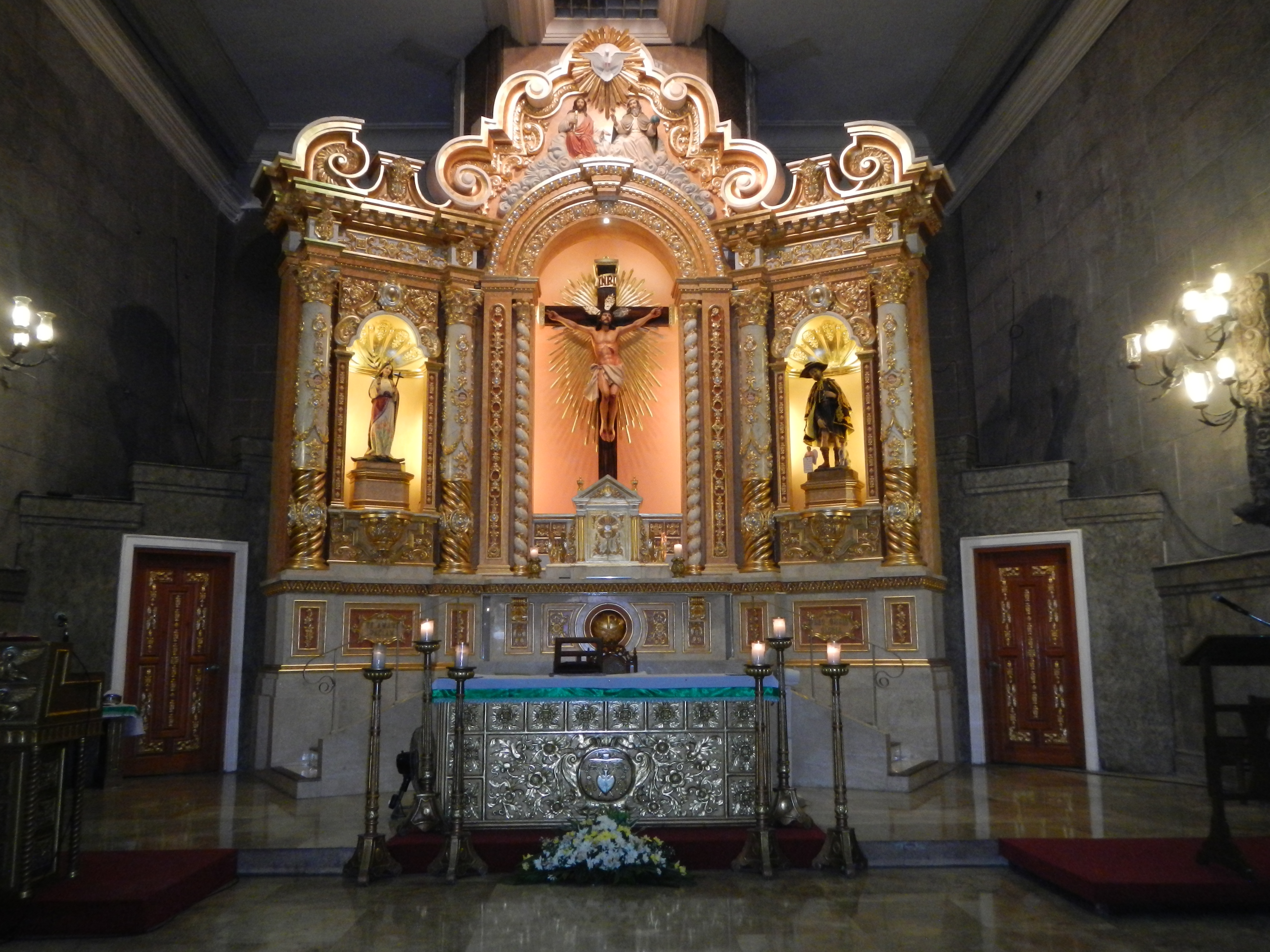
Church altar and reredos, 2013

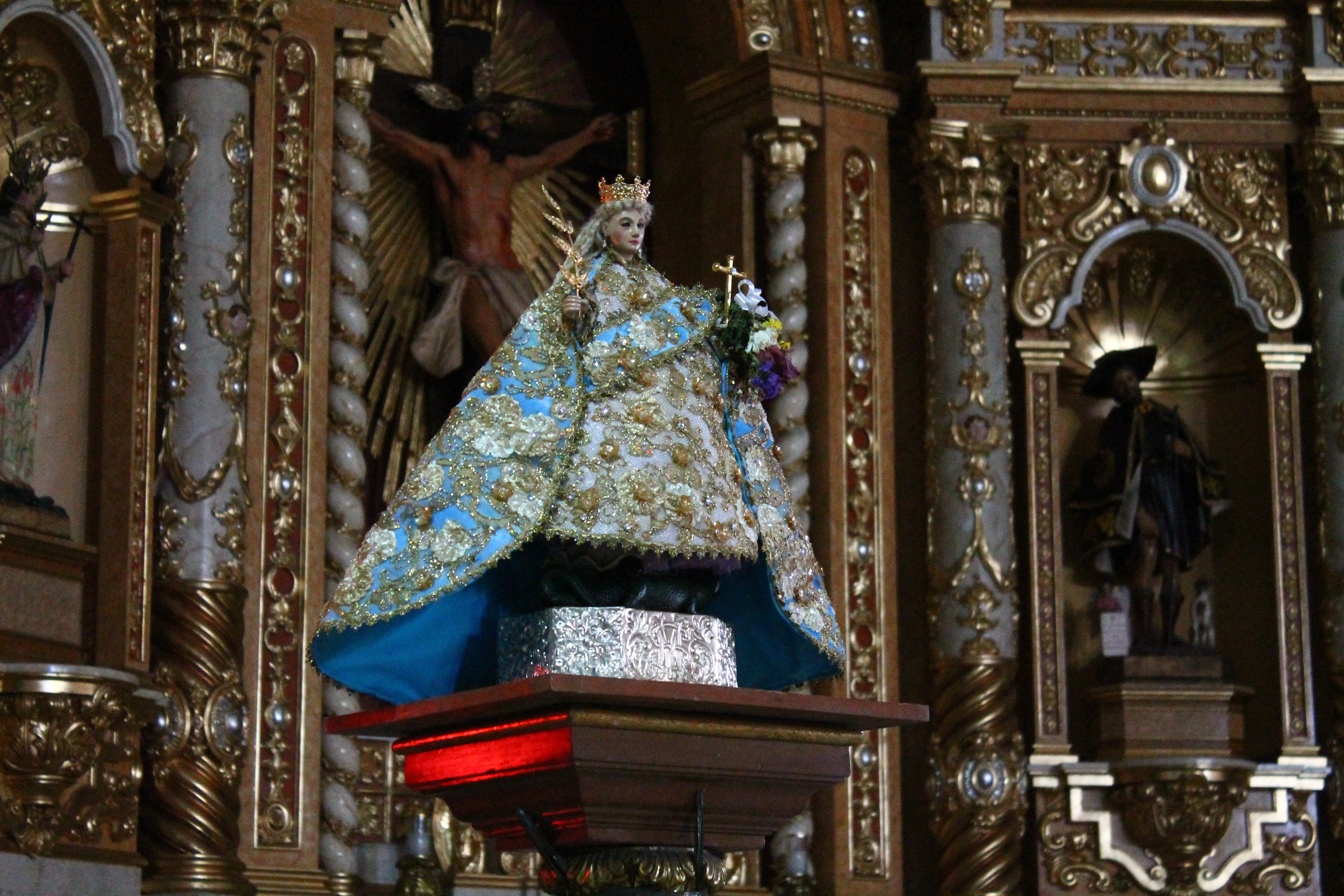
Santa Marta

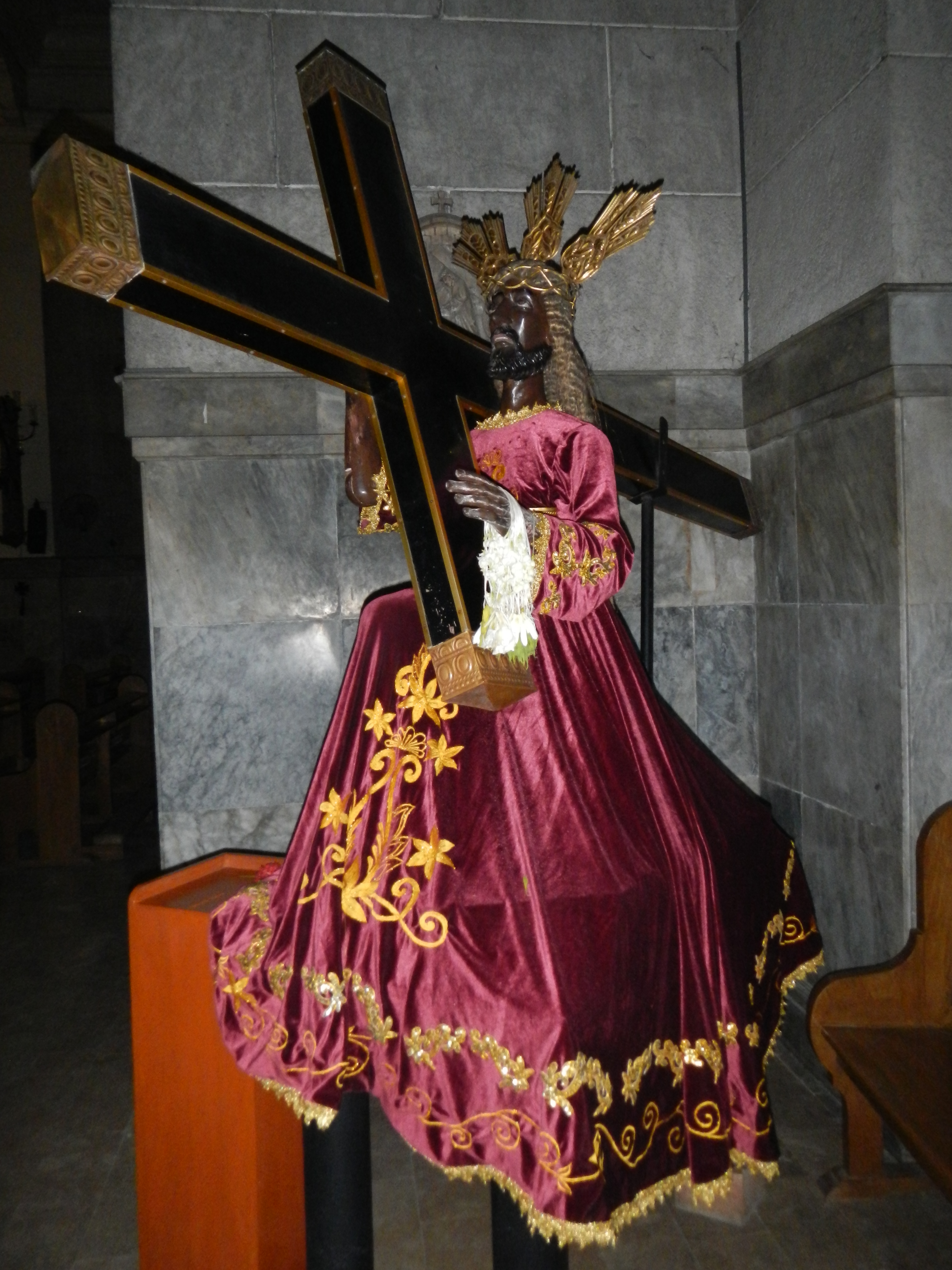
Black Nazarene

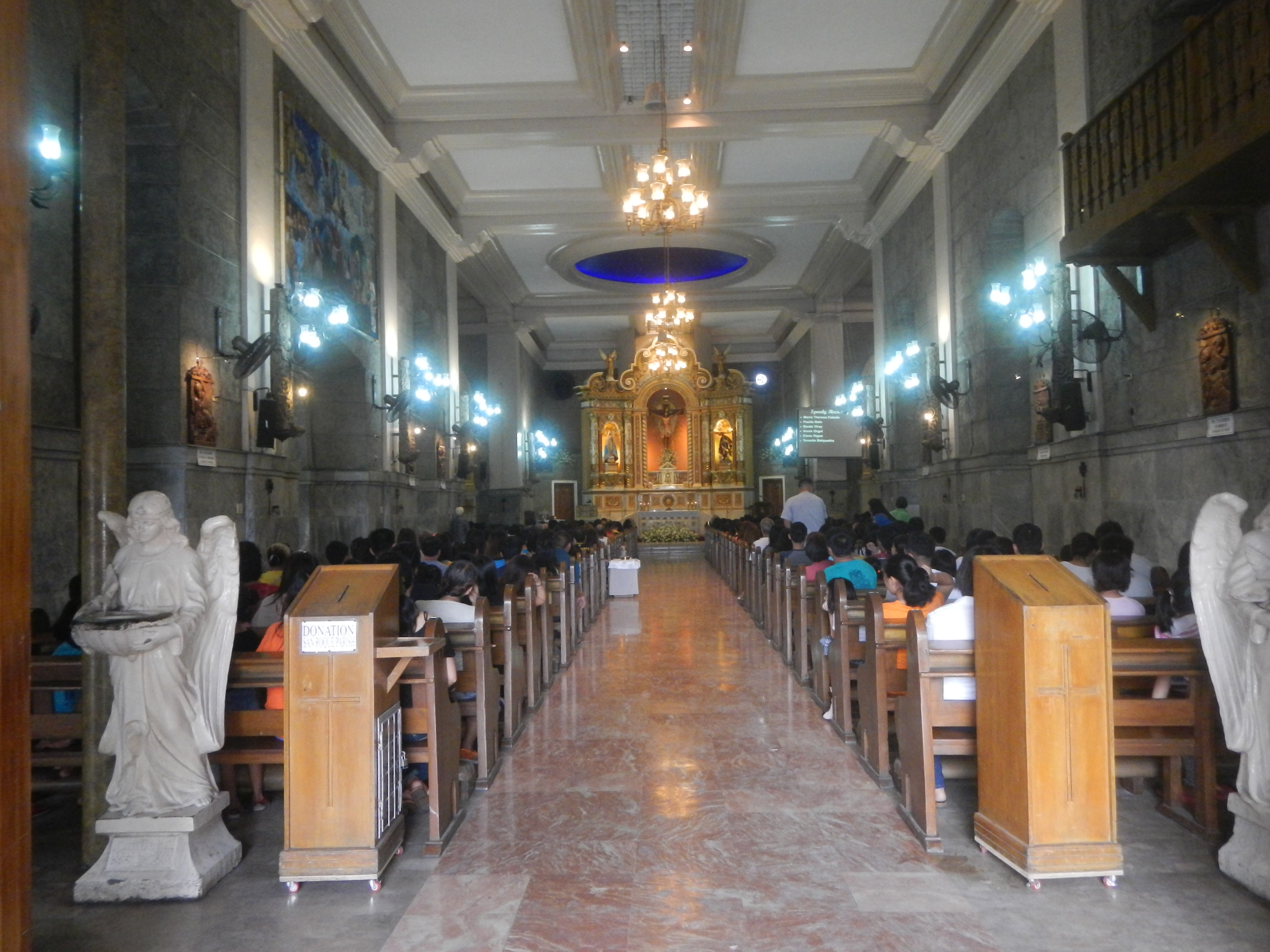
Church interior in 2017

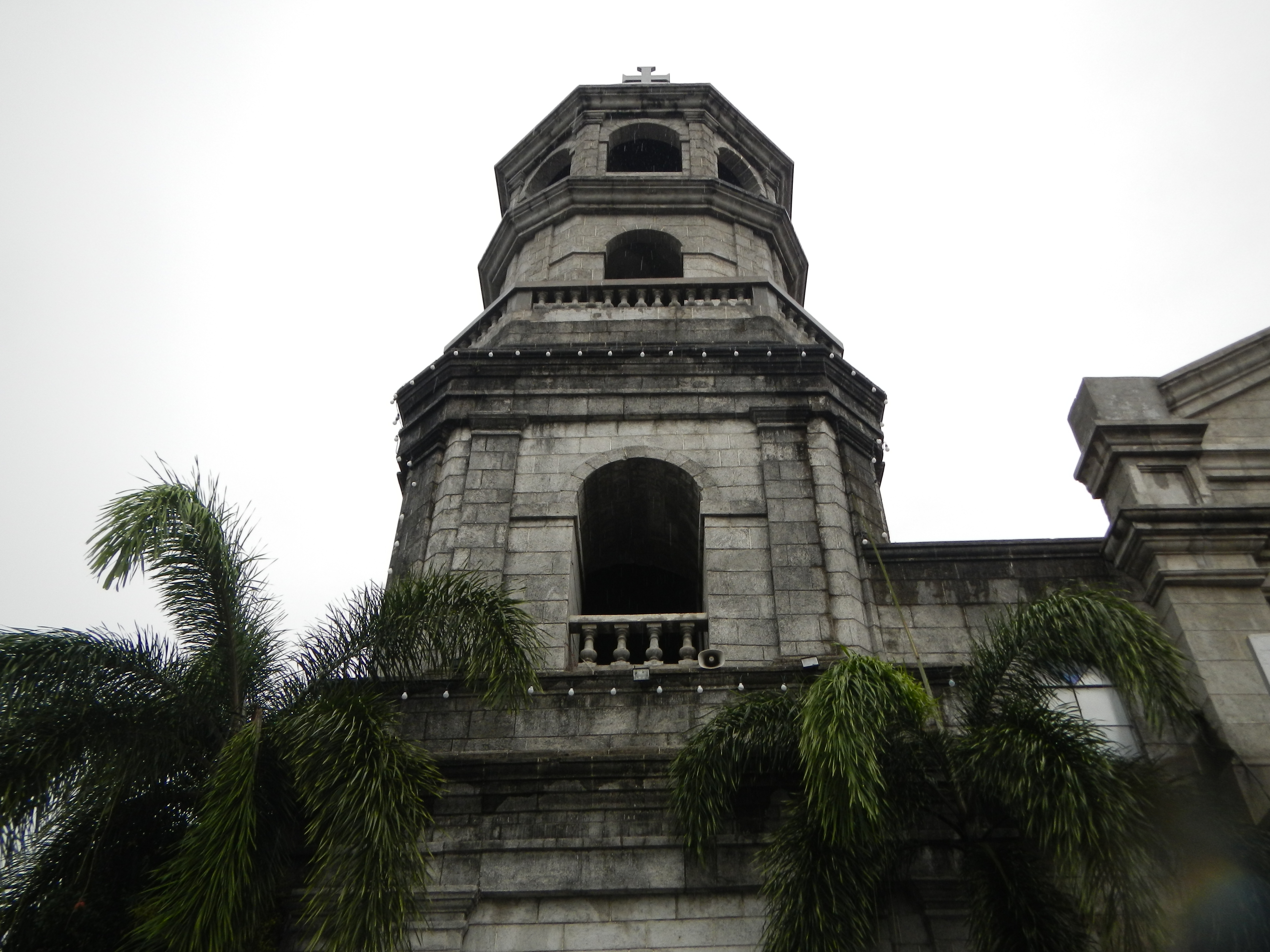
Bell tower

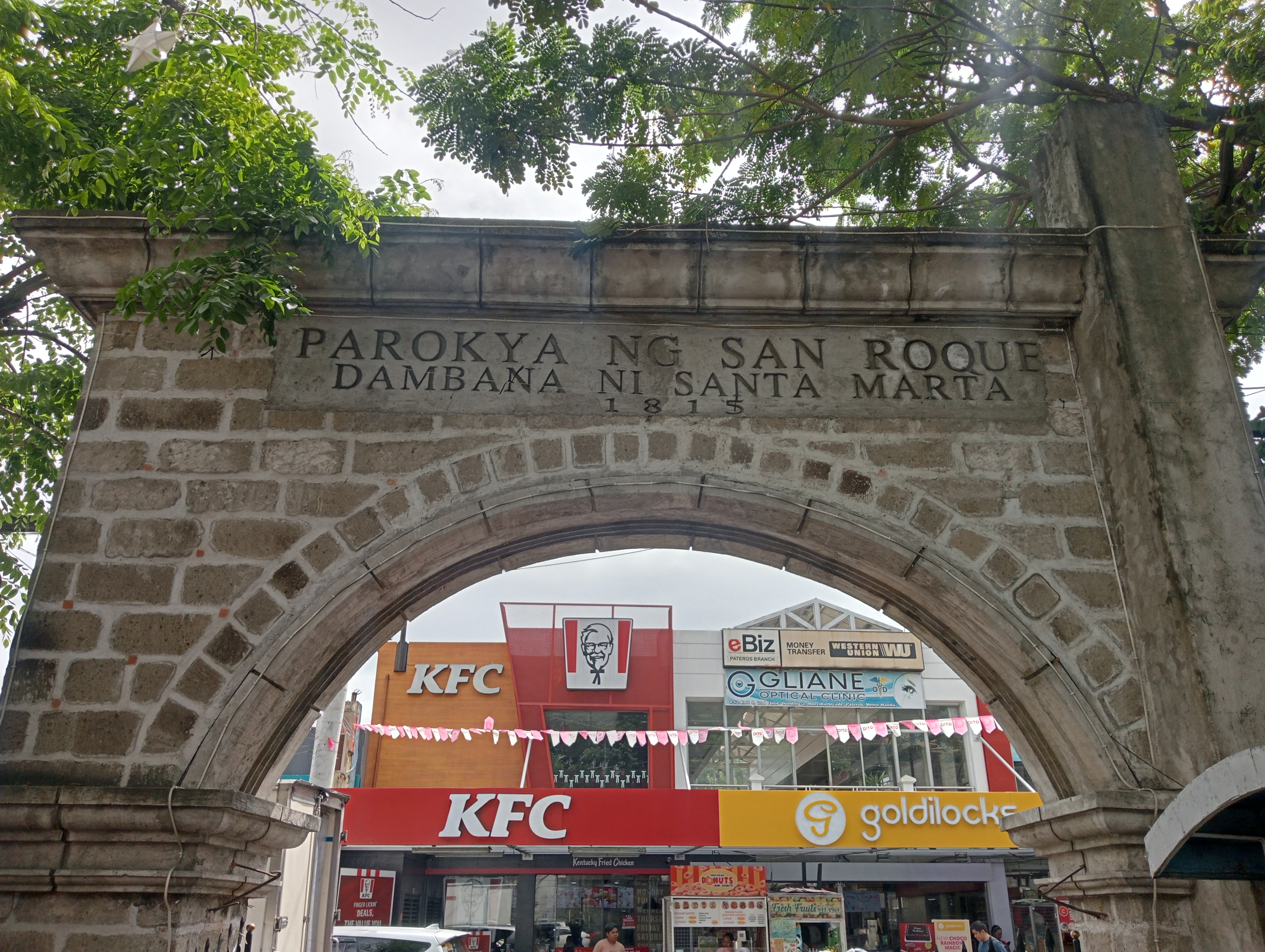
Welcome arch, 2024

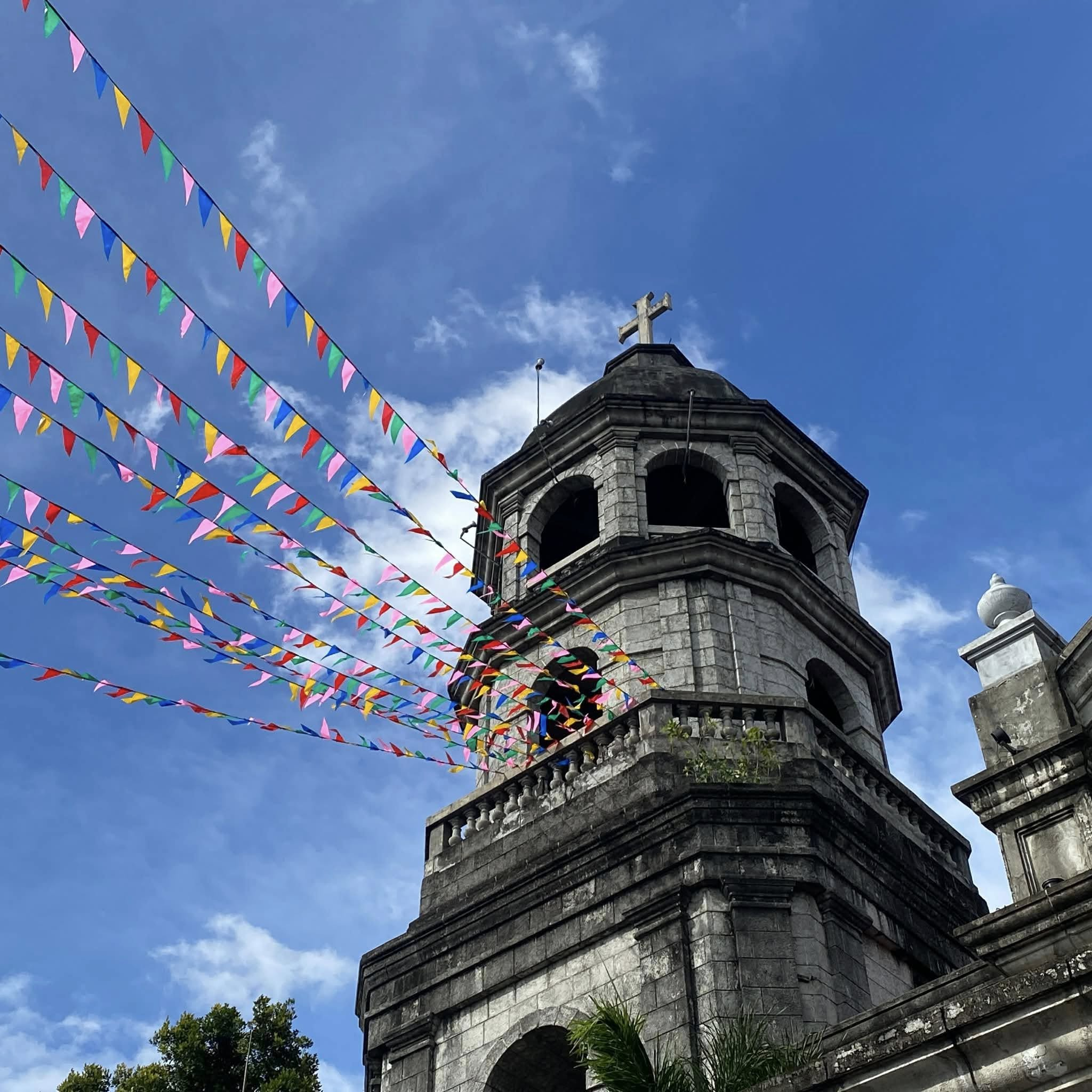
Bell tower, with flying decorations, 2026
