= Parañaque Cathedral =

Roman Catholic church in Parañaque, Philippines

- Cathedral Parish of Saint Andrew; Diocesan Shrine of Nuestra Señora del Buen Suceso
- Saint Andrew's Cathedral
- Catedral de San Andrés de Parañaque - Santuario de Nuestra Señora del Buen Suceso de Palanyag (Spanish); Katedral ng Parañaque (Filipino)
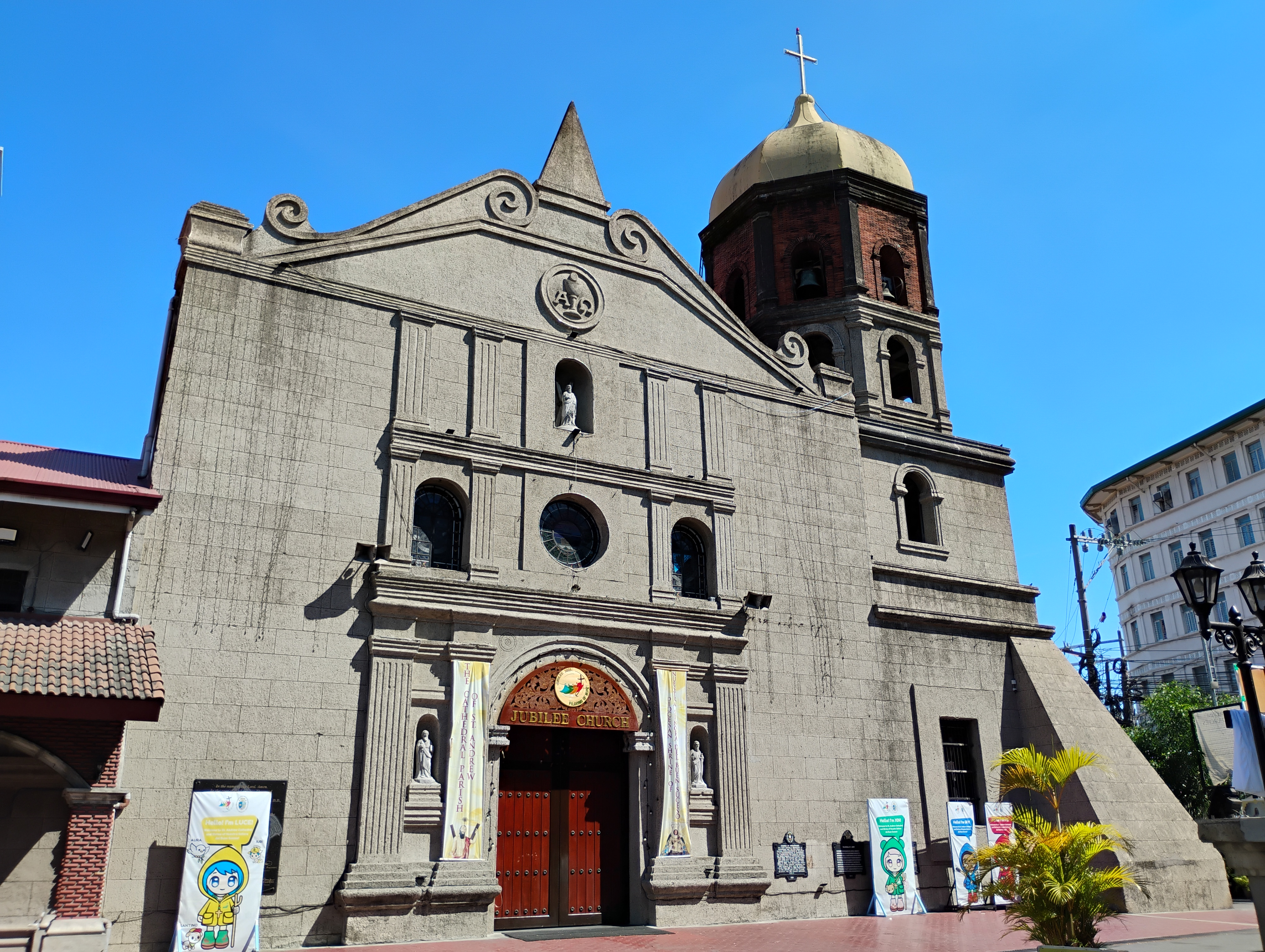
- Cathedral façade in 2025

- Location in Metro Manila Location in Luzon Location in the Philippines
- 14°30′01″N 120°59′31″E
- Location: Parañaque, Metro Manila
- Country: Philippines
- Denomination: Roman Catholic

History
- Former name: Church of Parañaque
- Status: Cathedral
- Founded: May 11, 1580
- Founder: Diego de Espinal
- Dedication: Andrew the Apostle
- Dedicated: Nuestra Señora del Buen Suceso and St. Andrew the Apostle

Architecture
- Functional status: Active
- Heritage designation: National Historical Commission of the Philippines
- Designated: 1939
- Architectural type: Church building
- Style: Baroque

Administration
- Province: Manila
- Metropolis: Manila
- Archdiocese: Manila
- Diocese: Parañaque

Clergy
- Bishop: Sede Vacante
- Rector: Rev. Fr. Lambert Legaspino
- Priests: Rev. Msgn. John Brillantes; Rev. Fr. Albert Adison

The Cathedral Parish of Saint Andrew, also known as the Diocesan Shrine of Nuestra Señora del Buen Suceso and commonly known as Parañaque Cathedral, is one of the oldest Roman Catholic churches in the Philippines, located in Parañaque City, Metro Manila. Established on May 11, 1580 by the Spanish Augustinians, it is, at present, the seat of the Diocese of Parañaque, which comprises the cities of Parañaque, Las Piñas, and Muntinlupa.

== History ==
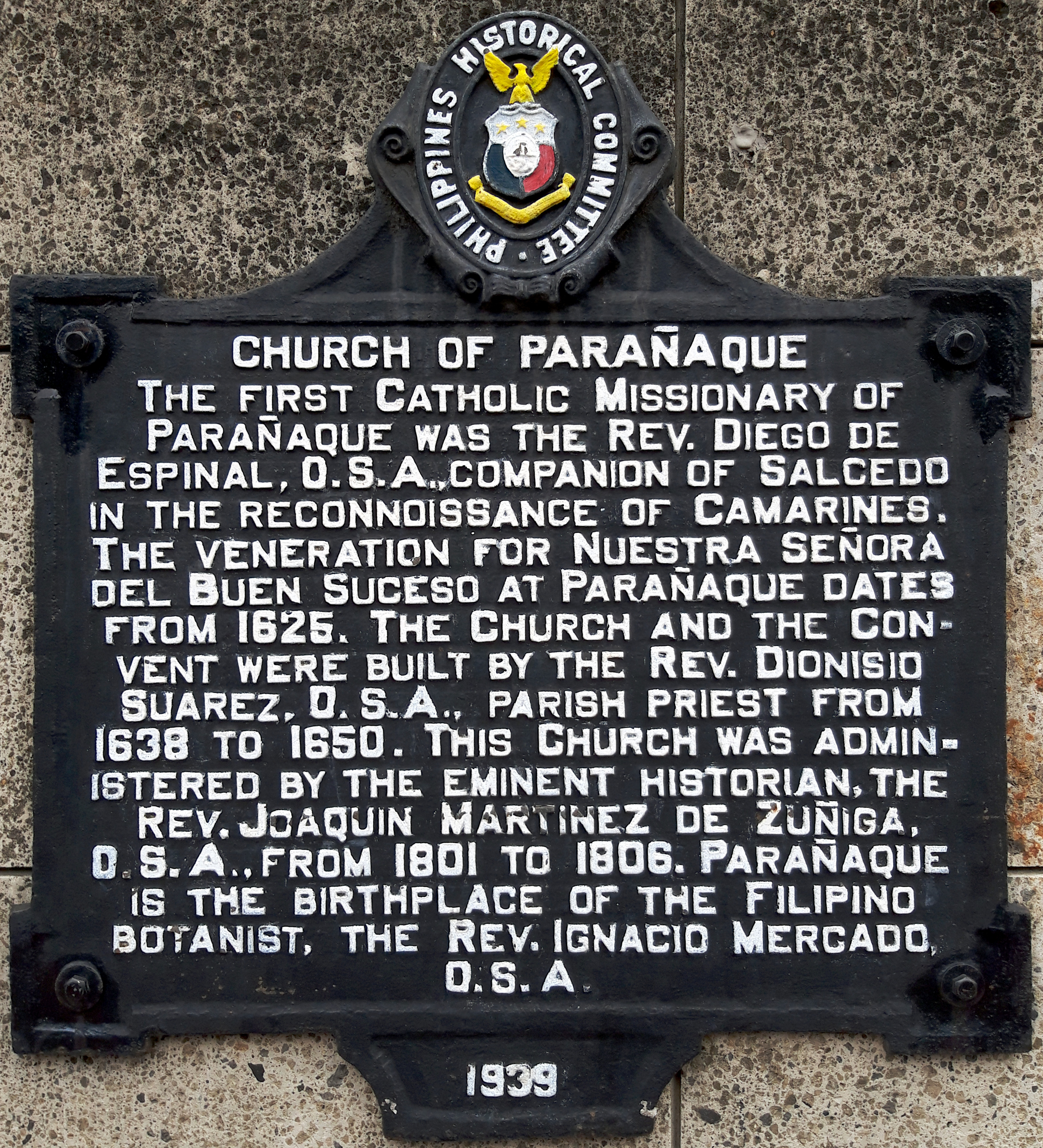
Church PHC historical marker installed in 1939

=== Spanish period ===
Saint Andrew Parish began when Augustinian missionaries set foot on a fishing village near the sea, some kilometers south of Manila, over four hundred years ago. The missionaries' purpose was to evangelize the natives in order to facilitate the conquest of the islands for Spain. The town was called "Palanyag", the contraction for the word Paglalayag which means sailing. At that time, Palanyag consisted of several nipa huts grouped as a residential settlement known as "barangays". Elviro Jorde Pérez, being the Augustinian historian in the 19th century, wrote that as early as 1575, the Provincial Chapter subjected the populace of Palanyag to the patronage of Saint Andrew, and later on to the advocacy of the Nuestra Señora del Buen Suceso, an image of the Blessed Virgin Mary enthroned on August 10, 1625.

The pioneer missionary in Parañaque was Juan de Orto. Although based in Manila, he started to administer to the spiritual needs of the village in 1575. In 1580, Diego de Espinal was appointed superior in the convent of Parañaque. He established a mission house, with its spiritual jurisdiction reaching up to Cavite El Viejo; he was assisted by Francisco Campos. The Conference of Chiefs of the Religious Order, held on May 11, 1580, accepted Palanyag as an independent town, and it is in this date which the foundation day of the parish of Saint Andrew the Apostle was officially known, under the patronage of Saint Andrew, patron of fishermen.

Since there was no income for parish maintenance at that time, royal support, as ordered by King Felipe II, was given to each religious order who worked on the conversion of the natives. Parañaque, in 1589, was given a periodic sustenance which consisted of 200 pesos and 200 bushels of rice for the two religious assigned to Saint Andrew. Later on, financial assistance was given to buy wine and oil to keep the Blessed Sacrament lighted.

During the 16th and 17th centuries, the Parish of Saint Andrew was made up of only a few homes, found mostly along the Parañaque River and Manila Bay in the present barrios of Don Galo, La Huerta and San Dionisio. Later, Tambo, Santo Niño and Baclaran developed. Barrios Don Galo, La Huerta and San Dionisio built visitas, or satellite chapels with facades turned towards the church. The San Nicolás de Tolentino Chapel located at Barrio La Huerta still has the inscription 1776, the year it was built.

In 1662, when the Chinese pirate Koxinga threatened to invade Manila, Governor-General Sabiniano Manrique de Lara ordered the demolition of all stone churches and convents located outside Intramuros, Manila. The stones were used to beef up the defenses of Manila as well as to prevent its use by the enemy as defenses. More than a dozen churches and convents, which included the only one in Parañaque, were torn down. The original convent of Saint Andrew was demolished.

Eusebio Polo was the parish priest of St. Andrew in 1759, during the British invasion of Manila. He was then succeeded by Manuel de Sto. Tomás García in 1762. Both priests were deported to Goa, India, with 12 other fellow Augustinians.

=== Congregation of the Immaculate Heart of Mary ===
After more than three hundred years of the Augustinians, the missionaries from the Congregation of the Immaculate Heart of Mary came to administer the parish. A lot of changes came, including the foundation of the parish's school, St. Andrew's School, the creation of the church's social arm, Parañaque Development Foundation, Inc., the several replacements of the church's altar and the creation of a dome on which the crucifix that signifies the Lord Jesus Christ is placed.

=== Secularization ===
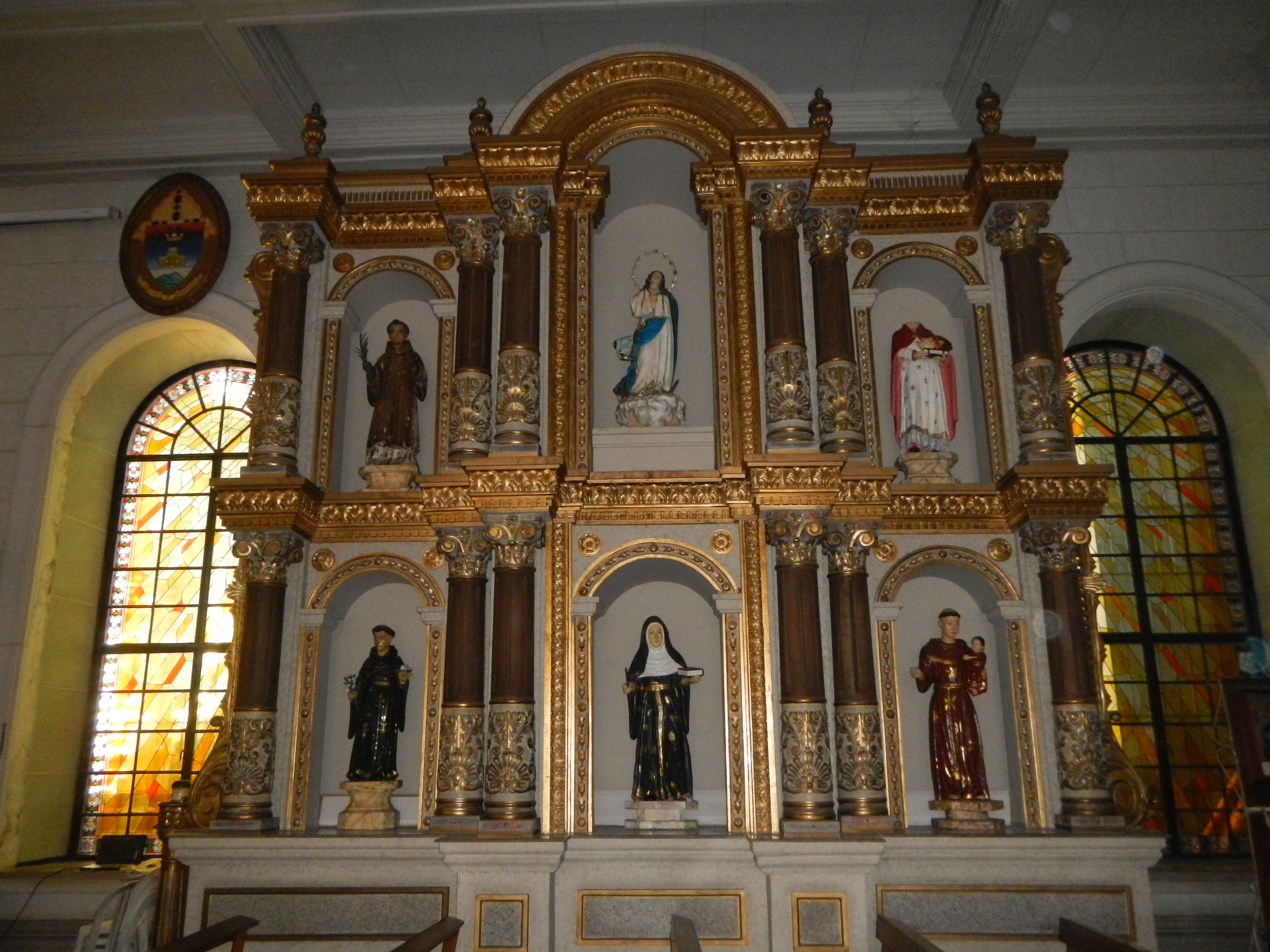
The reredos

Upon secularization on January 1, 1994 (led by Romerico Prieto of the Archdiocese of Manila), the altar was once again replaced and enthroned the image of the Nuestra Señora del Buen Suceso in the center tabernacle. Because of the desire to make the altar more attractive, it was again replaced in 1997 by Bayani Valenzuela with a classic baroque style. In this said altar, the image of the parish's patron, Saint Andrew the Apostle is found on the right hand side of the altar, while the image of Saint Joseph is found on the left. In the center of the altar is where the image of Our Lady of Buen Suceso is found.

=== Cathedral ===
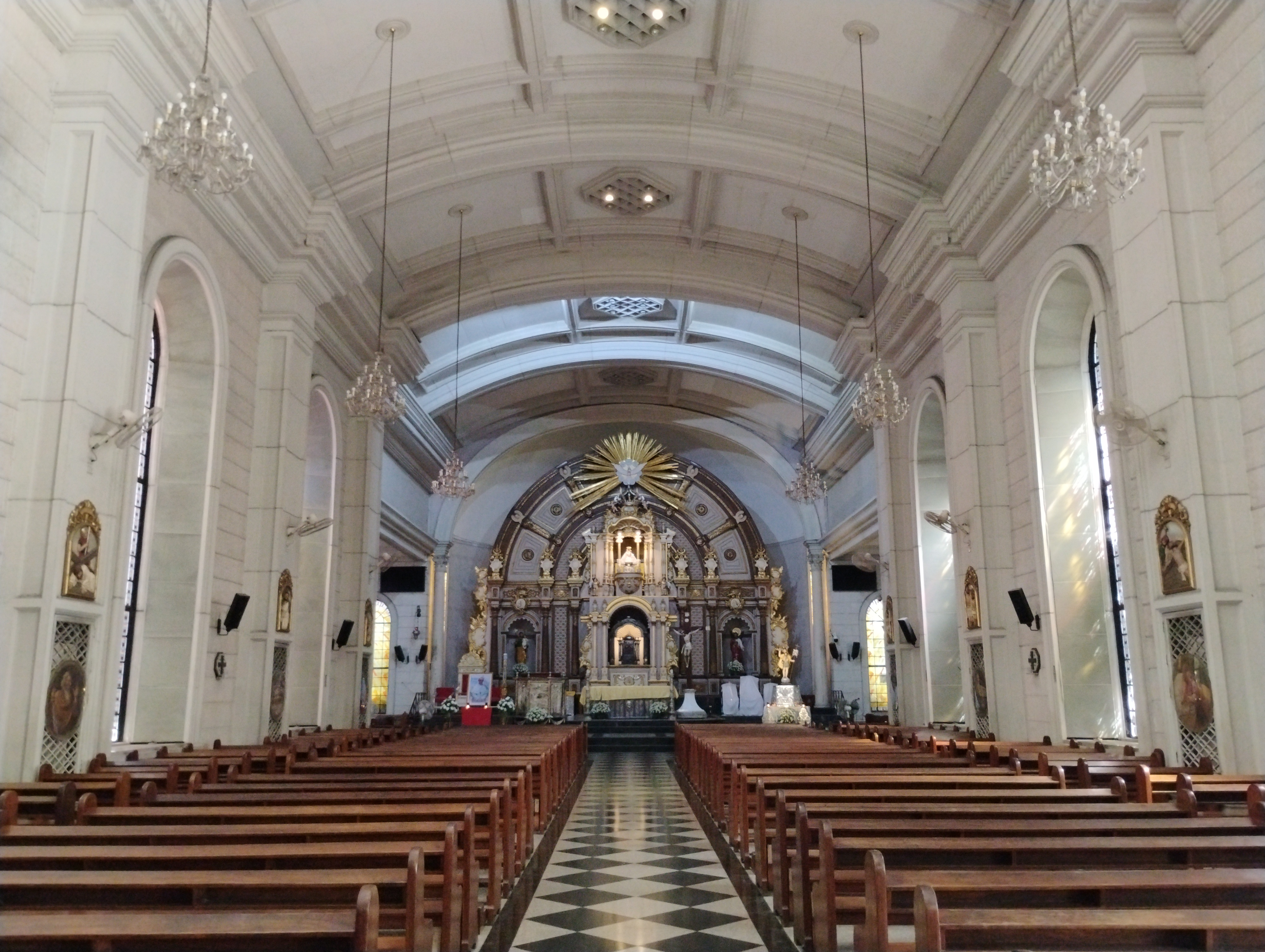
Church interior in 2025

Before Manila Archbishop Cardinal Jaime L. Sin retired, he erected new dioceses due to the increasing number of the Catholic population. One of the newly formed dioceses was the Diocese of Parañaque. Manila Auxiliary Bishop Jesse E. Mercado, then serving as the District Bishop of the Ecclesiastical District of Parañaque (former known as the District of Pasay/PPLM), was appointed as its first bishop on January 28, 2003.

The church provided a new organ that the choirs use during Masses. Also, a cathedra was placed, as a seat for the bishop. The baptismal font was placed in the right hand side of the altar and there were twelve marble stones with crucifixes which symbolizes the Twelve apostles of Jesus Christ. There was also the setting up of the PowerPoint visuals to guide the parishioners in celebration of the holy Masses.

== Annual events ==
=== Feasts ===
Every year, the parish community of St. Andrew's celebrate two main feasts. First of them is the feast of Nuestra Señora del Buen Suceso. After World War II and up to year 2004, the feast was celebrated every 29th day of November. The feast day of Nuestra Señora del Buen Suceso was then moved to August 10 in the year 2005, in line with her enthronement in the parish by the Augustinians back in the year 1625. A novena prayer in honor of the Blessed Virgin is prayed for nine days before the actual feast day. Traslacion happens during the first day of novena from Sta. Monica chapel to Cathedral. But during the term of Rolando Agustin, the Traslacion was stopped because, according to Agustin, it is unliturgical. During the feast day itself, a procession is held at around 4 PM and a Solemn Mass follows. The same is also done during the feast day of the parish's patron, Saint Andrew the Apostle.

Feast dates approved by the Diocese of Parañaque:

- January 25 - Being a cathedral and seat of the bishop of the Diocese of Parañaque (2003)
- May 11 - Being a parish church of Parañaque City (1580)
- August 1–9 - Novena Masses in honour of Nuestra Señora del Buen Suceso
- August 10 - Feast day and Enthronement of Nuestra Señora del Buen Suceso (1625)
- August 10 - Being a Diocesan Shrine of Nuestra Señora del Buen Suceso (2012)
- September 8 - Canonical coronation of Nuestra Señora del Buen Suceso (2000)
- November 21–29 - Novena Masses in honour of St. Andrew the Apostle
- November 30 - Feast day of St. Andrew the Apostle

=== Canonical coronation of Nuestra Señora del Buen Suceso ===
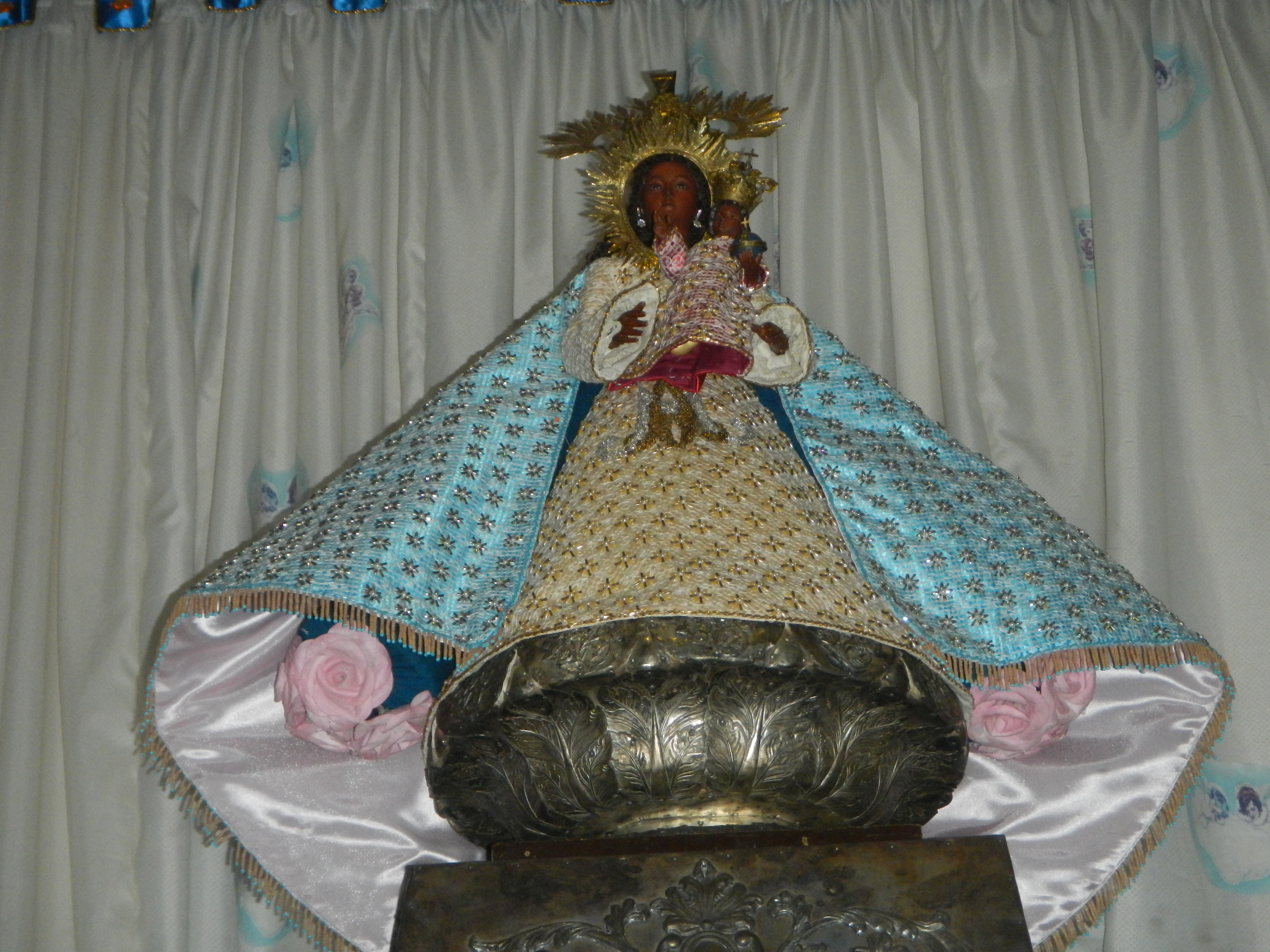
Nuestra Señora del Buen Suceso

On September 8, 2000, the image of Nuestra Señora del Buen Suceso was canonically crowned as the Patroness of the City of Parañaque. On the same day, the official replica made by Tom Joven was blessed, along with the book of sacrifice, the petition box and the thanksgiving box, by Manuel Gabriel during the Solemn High Mass. The Diocese of Parañaque approved a decree signed by the chancellor and the Bishop of Parañaque that the Cofradia de Nuestra Señora del Buen Suceso was tasked to promote, propagate and preserve the devotion and shall be the custodian of the original image. The Recamaderas de la Virgen who are exclusively women whose members come from each sub-parishes (Sta. Monica, San Nicolas de Tolentino, San Dionisio and San Antonio de Padua), are primarily responsible for vesting the image together with the Commission on Patrimony that conducts the periodic inspection of the structural integrity and supervise the vesting of the image and its jewelries. They also instructed Matt Ryan de Leon to be the Camarero or Steward of our Lady of the Good Event. A manual "The Care of the Image of Nuestra Señora del Buen Suceso: Policies and Procedures" was made and kept by the cathedral office for the primary care of the original image of the Virgin Mary.

=== Renovation ===
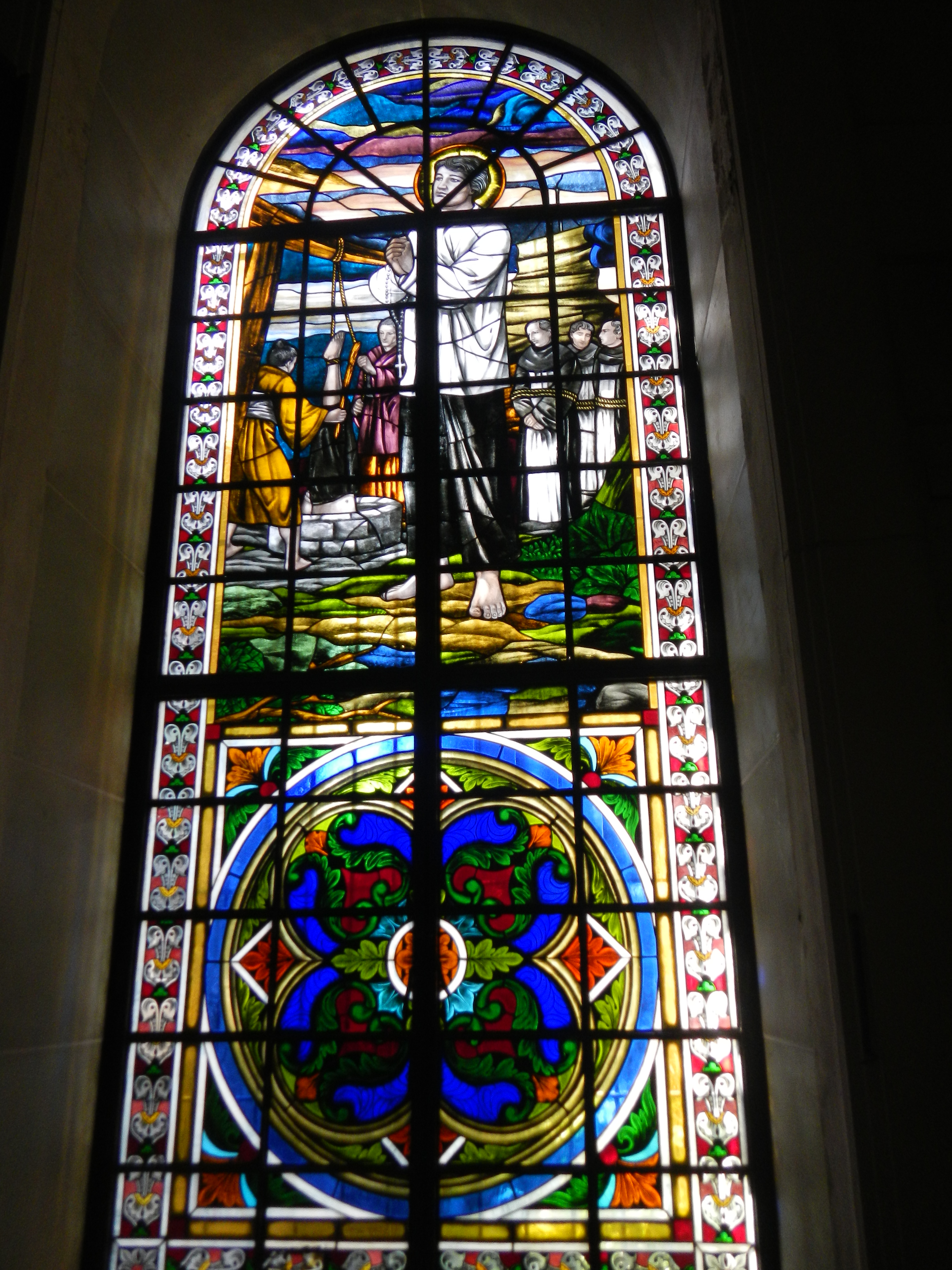
Stained glass window featuring Saint Lorenzo Ruiz

On January 25, 2009, Manuel G. Gabriel, the parish priest and rector of the cathedral parish launched the major renovation of the cathedral with the blessing of Jesse E. Mercado. The renovation has changed the major altar placing the crucifix on its center, adding two side altars (Altar of Saints and Altar of Nuestra Señora del Buen Suceso), replaced the glass windows with stained glass featuring some of the important events in the Life of Jesus, placed new marble stone on the floor and replaced the roof and ceiling of the cathedral, painting the interior walls, replaced the doors, placed air conditioning units and has restored the image of Nuestra Señora del Buen Suceso and Andrew the Apostle.

The newly renovated Cathedral Parish of St. Andrew was blessed on May 22, 2010, in line with the celebration of the 430th Dedication of St. Andrew's Parish.

=== Dedication of being the Parish of St. Andrew ===
The cathedral and Parañaqueños celebrated the 430th anniversary of St. Andrew Parish as a parish on May 11, 2010, with its theme: "Dakilang Pagdiriwang ng ika-430 taon ng Ebanghelisasyon at Biyaya...Tayo na, Pumalaot at Mamalakaya..." (The Great 430th Year of Evangelization and Grace... Come, Let Us Sail and Trawl...). It was a one-week celebration starting May 11, 2010, until the blessing of the cathedral on May 22, 2010. The program included Parañaque traditions such as Grand Sunduan of all sub-parishes (San Dionisio, Sta. Monica, San Nicolas and San Antonio), Sayaw ng Pagbati Festival, Komedya ng San Dionisio, Food and Crafts Exhibit, Music Festival and the Parañaque/Palanyag Movie.

=== Declaration as a diocesan shrine ===
On August 10, 2012, the Diocese of Parañaque sent a Decree No. 2012-005, officially declaring the Cathedral-Parish of St. Andrew as a diocesan shrine. After a congratulatory greeting during Mass, Bishop Jesse Mercado through Carmelo Estores, read the declaration of the Cathedral-Parish of St. Andrew as the diocesan shrine of Nuestra Señora del Buen Suceso.

== Bibliography ==
- The Solemn Canonical Coronation of the Nuestra Señora del Buen Suceso, September 8, 2000
- Palanyag to Parañaque by Dulce Festin-Baybay, a book published by the City of Parañaque
- Nobena sa Karangalan ng Nuestra Señora del Buen Suceso, October 7, 1996, p. 6
- Simbahan ng San Andres Noon at Ngayon (The Church of St. Andrew, Then and Now) by Dr. Lulet Tungpalan, Ms. Noemi Pabico and Mr. Raymond Calma, from the LAYAG, the official newsletter of the Cathedral Parish of St. Andrew, year-end edition 2004
- Nobena sa Karangalan ni San Andres Apostol (Novena) November, 2005
- Liturgical Schedules are based from the cathedral's 2007 calendar
