= St. Andrew's School (Parañaque) =

Roman Catholic school in Parañaque, Philippines

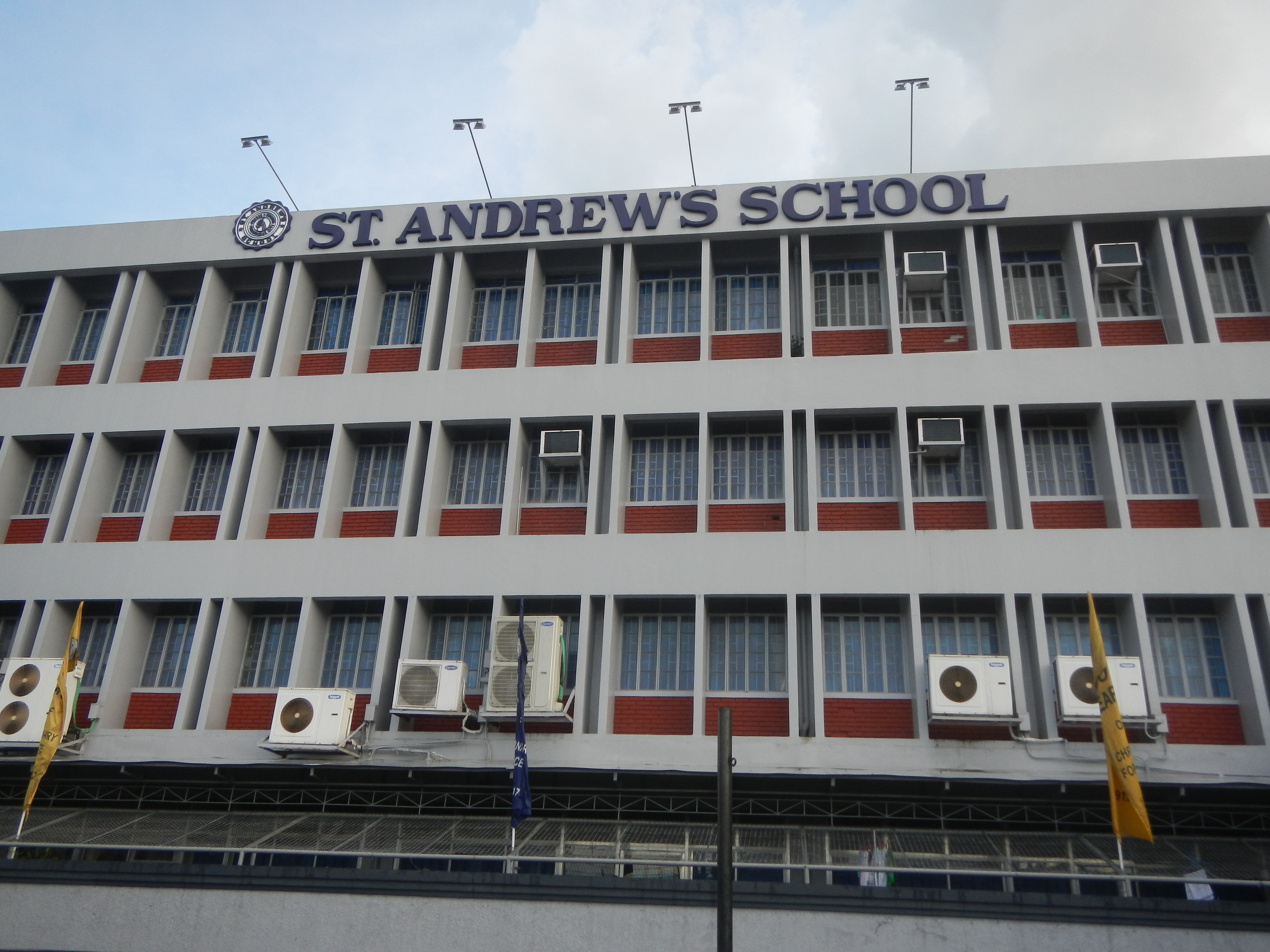
- School facade in 2017

Location
- Quirino Ave., La Huerta; Parañaque; Philippines
- Coordinates: 14°30′2″N 120°59′31″E

Information
- Type: Private, Catholic, Parochial
- Motto: Pro Deo et Patria
- Established: June 27, 1917
- Enrollment: 2,000+^{A1}
- Colors: Blue █ and Yellow Gold █
- Mascot: SAS Blue Dolphins
- Hymn: St. Andrew's School Hymn
- Patron: St. Andrew the Apostle
- Website: www.andreans.edu.ph
- ^Note A1 : As of S.Y. 2012-2013.

Saint Andrew's School, Inc. or Saint Andrew's School (SAS) is a private Catholic parochial school of the Cathedral Parish of St. Andrew managed by the Diocese of Parañaque. It is more than a hundred year old private school in the city of Parañaque, National Capital Region, Philippines. The school offers Primary Grade School (Toddler, Nursery, Kinder, Grades 1 to 3), Middle Grade School (Grades 4 to 6), Junior High School (Grades 7 to 10), Senior High School (Grades 11 & 12 - STEM, ABM, HUMSS) and other special academic programs (Special Education and Alternative Learning System).

== History ==
=== The Augustinians ===
St. Andrew Parish was established by the Augustinian missionaries who landed in a fishery village during the Spanish era in the Philippines to evangelize and spread Christianity to the land. These missionary friars ministered over Palanyag for almost four hundred years.

=== The CICM Missionaries ===
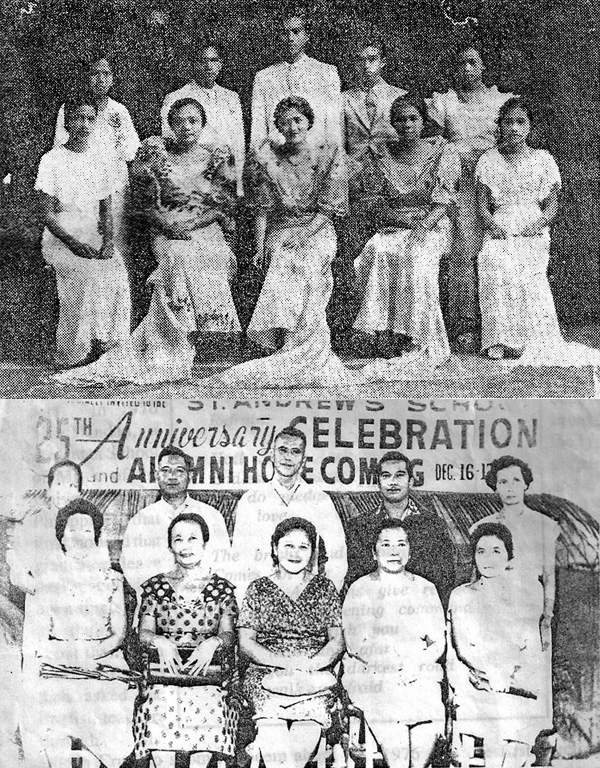
The Magnificent Seven of St. Andrew's School (Parañaque). Above: Original class picture. Below: Picture on their 25th anniversary. Seated (L-R) - Gorgonia Isidro; Maria Ligot (instructor); Flora Ongpin (instructor); Jovita Enriquez (instructor); Natividad Santiago Vda. de Cruz Standing - Paz Rodriguez; Artemio Cruz; Leonardo Mecua; Jesus Santos; Maria A. dela Cruz de Magno..

After the Augustinians came the missionaries of the Congregatio Immaculati Cordis Mariae (CICM), otherwise known as the Congregation of the Immaculate Heart of Mary. Joseph "Pare Jose" Van Runckelen, born at Kortenaken, April 16, 1883, was assigned as parish priest of St. Andrew Parish in October 1915. With the donations and help from the people of Belgium, Van Runckelen established the said school on June 27, 1917, and titled it after Saint Andrew, the patron of the parish. Incorporated in his newly established elementary school were four of his colleagues from CICM. One of the first teachers in the school is Eleuterio de Leon who had been Mayor of Parañaque.

In 1932, Van Runckelen expanded the school, and with Gloria Aspillera-Quintos, he founded the high school department. The new department started with 32 students (20 boys and 12 girls) and ended up to seven (four boys and three girls); moreover, the seven were the first high school graduates dubbed as The Magnificent Seven.

Upon the death of Van Runckelen in Parañaque on October 24, 1934, Antonio Van Overveld took over as head of St. Andrew's School from 1934 to 1937. In his period, the school was relocated from the original, which is present site of St. Paul College of Parañaque, to the Parañaque convent building, where the school is presently located.

After Van Overveld, Adolfo Cansse became school director from 1937 to 1952.

=== From co-educational to "exclusive for boys" ===
When World War II broke out in 1941, the school was closed. After the war, the school re-opened for school year 1945-1946 through the efforts of Cansse and notable faculty members. However, the school opened only the first year class and it was exclusively for boys. St. Paul College of Parañaque, a neighboring school, offered education only for girls.

Cansse, as a civil engineer, expanded the school by building the gymnasium and more classrooms in 1949. Louis Thys, school director from 1952 to 1977, made several improvements in the school such as a three-story building of different facilities and the library on the second floor. The school hymn, composed by Francis Dandan, was first sung by the graduating class of 1976. Also, 55 typewriters were acquired, resulting the inclusion of the bookkeeping subject for third year and stenography and typing in the fourth year curricula.

Foulon soon became the school director from 1977 to 1991. In 1979, the annual publication of The Andrean was initiated. Joseph Gevaert, the last CICM school director, managed from 1991 to 1993.

=== Religious to diocesan, and the revival of coeducation ===
The year 1994 marked the transition of the parish's and school's administration from religious to diocesan. Romerico A. Prieto, the first diocesan parish priest of the parish became school director from 1994 to 1995; followed by Manuel Sebastian (1995–1996) and Manuel Valenzuela (1996–2004).

Valenzuela made numerous developments to the school: the construction of a new building for the preschool and elementary departments, a new gymnasium, computer rooms, laboratories for physics, chemistry and home economics and other facilities. In 1999, the preschool department, later dubbed as the Center for Early Childhood Education (CECE), was founded by Valenzuela and Gertrudes F. Bautista. Also in the same year the coeducational status was revived. It started in the CECE department (S.Y. 1999–2000) and the elementary department (S.Y. 2000–2001)

=== The birth of a new Diocese ===
Pope John Paul II created the new Diocese of Parañaque, an offshoot of the Archdiocese of Manila, on December 7, 2002. He appointed Jesse E. Mercado, an auxiliary bishop of Manila, to become the first bishop of the diocese. Manuel Gabriel then became school director from 2004 until October 2011. Augusto C. Pulido is the current director of the school

St. Andrew's School gained an award from the Consumers and Marketing Executive in the Philippine Marketing Excellency Awards for being The Most Outstanding Catholic School for Boys (Parañaque) in May 2006.

=== Contemporary ===
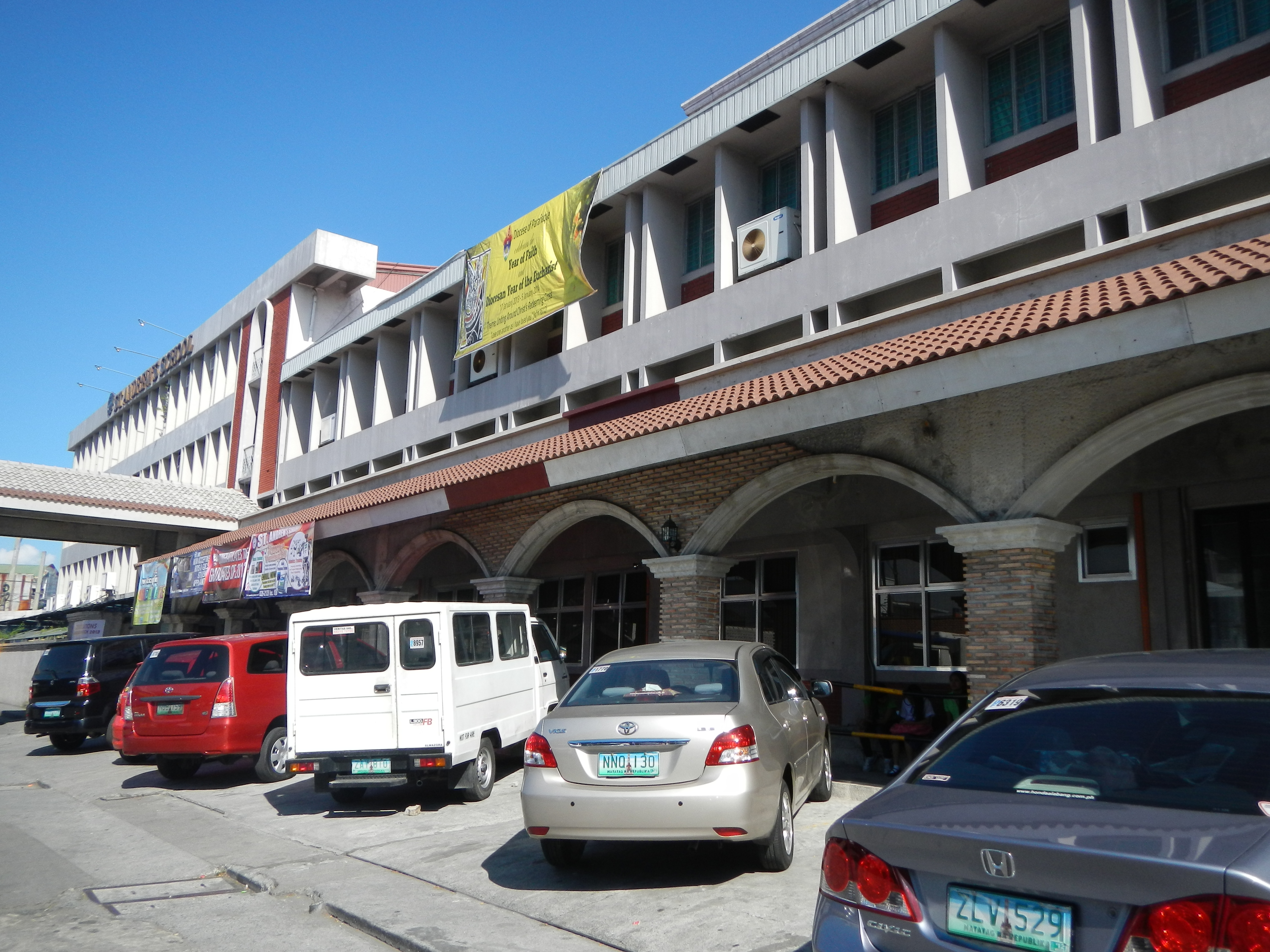
St. Andrew's School (Parañaque).

In the late 2005, the gymnasium was demolished to make way for a six-story building with the gymnasium at the top floor. The construction was finished early 2007.

The High School Department opened its doors for girls in 2006 as the coeducational status prospered.

In 2007, the school supported the Department of Education's project, Alternative Learning System Accreditation and Equivalency (ALS A&E), together with Pag-unlad ng Kabataan sa Kapatiran ni San Andres (PKKSA). The project fosters alternative education to out-of-school youths and adults in relation to the "Christian and missionary formation" of the school. In February 2008, one hundred learners from SAS registered to take the national test. 16,000 from 80,000 examinees passed, and 27 passers were from SAS. Also, passers of the ALS A&E test graduated and received their high school diploma

== School life and culture ==
=== School hymn ===
Francis Dandan, the organist of the school and the St. Andrew Parish Choir (SAPC), came upon an idea of composing the school hymn for he noticed graduates leave the school without an alma mater song since the school was established. In 1976, he asked the English teachers, with the help of Odelia Cruz, to submit a poem about the school and that he composed the music for the chosen piece. Dandan based the lyrics from the works of Edith Ferrer, Maximo Marcelo and Paul Foulon. After several revisions, the hymn was completed on March 6, 1976, and it was taught to the graduating class for them to sing it on their commencement exercises. Thus, the batch of 1976 was first to sing the St. Andrew's School Hymn.

St. Andrew's School Hymn
Beloved St. Andrew's
The knowledge we obtain
From the Lord God above
Through thy guidance and love.

You inspire our will
To reach our Golden Goal
Love God and Country
Proudly we proclaim.

Refrain:
Hail St. Andrew's
Endless fountain of wisdom
We do pledge a life of serving love.

The bright and shining morning
Comes in our life
We the Andreans give respect
To thy enlightening command.

We shall cherish you
from here and afar
With you the darkest road
We'll walk unafraid.

=== Publications ===
- The Andrean, the annual publication
- The SAS Courier, the official student publication (English)
- Ang Mensahero, the official student publication (Filipino)

== School Directors ==
- Rev. Fr. Josef Van Runckelen, CICM, 1917-1934 (founder)
- Rev. Fr. Antoon Van Overveld, CICM, 1934-1937
- Rev. Fr. Adolf Cansse, CICM, 1937-1952
- Rev. Fr. Louis Thijs, CICM, 1952-1977
- Rev. Fr. Paul Foulon, CICM, 1977-1991
- Rev. Fr. Francis Gevaert, CICM, 1991-1994
- Rev. Fr. Romerico A. Prieto, 1994-1995
- Rev. Msgr. Manuel F. Sebastian, 1995-1996
- Rev. Msgr. Bayani G. Valenzuela, 1996-2004
- Rev. Msgr. Manuel G. Gabriel, 2004-2012
- Rev. Fr. Rolando R. Agustin, 2012-2018
- Rev. Msgr. Allen C. Aganon, 2018–2020
- Rev. Fr. Augusto C. Pulido, 2020–2025
- Rev. Fr. Rolando R. Agustin, 2025–present

(Note: CICM priest names are based on the CICM archives and birth name)

== Notable alumni ==
- Andrew Ford "Andrew E." Espiritu - Filipino rapper, record producer and actor
- Mario Teodoro "Ted Failon" Etong - Former ABS-CBN news anchor, DZMM radio announcer, and former congressman of Tacloban
- Jaime Fresnedi - Former mayor of Muntinlupa; now incumbent congressman of Muntinlupa
- Edward S. Hagedorn - Former mayor of Puerto Princesa City, Palawan
- Cardinal Luis Antonio G. Tagle - Prefect of the Congregation for the Evangelization of Peoples, former Archbishop of Manila, current Cardinal-Bishop of Albano

== Affiliations ==
- Diocese of Parañaque Parochial Schools Association
- Manila Archdiocesan and Parochial Schools Association
- Catholic Educational Association of the Philippines
- Association for Supervision Curriculum and Development
