= Our Lady of the Good Event (Parañaque) =

Patroness of City and Diocese of Parañaque

Coordinates: 14.300°N 120.5930°E

Our Lady of the Good Event; Nuestra Señora del Buen Suceso; Ina ng Mabuting Pangyayari; Mabunying Reyna ng Palanyag
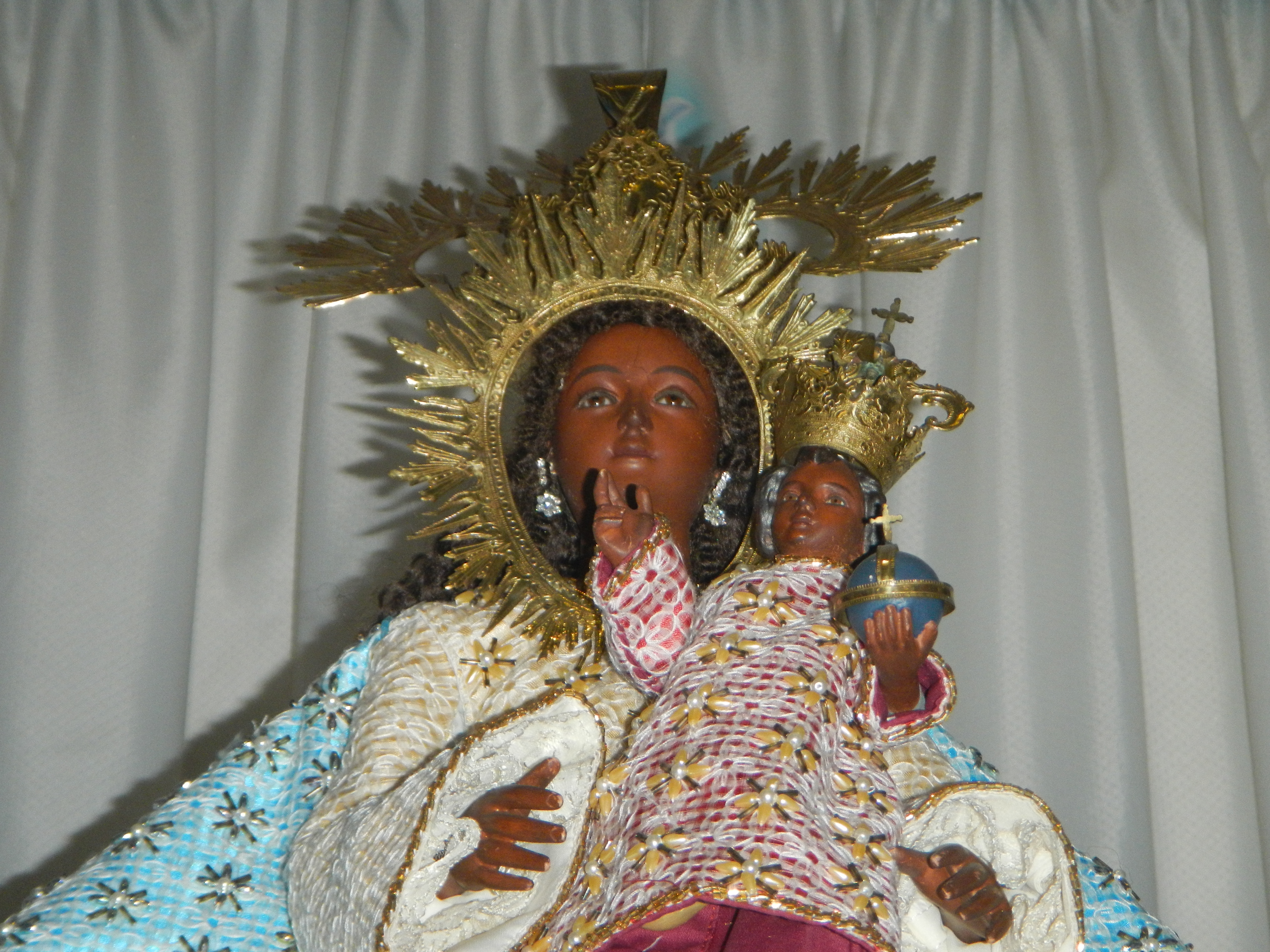
- Location: Parañaque, Philippines
- Date: 1580
- Type: wooden statue
- Approval: September 8, 2000 by Pope John Paul II
- Shrine: Diocesan Shrine of Nuestra Señora del Buen Suceso (Cathedral Parish of St. Andrew, Parañaque, Philippines)
- Patronage: City and Diocese of Parañaque, Sick, Afflicted, Travelers
- Attributes: Holding the infant Jesus

Our Lady of the Good Event of Parañaque (Spanish: Nuestra Señora del Buen Suceso de Parañaque; Filipino: Ina ng Mabuting Pangyayari ng Parañaque; {{langx|fil|is the name of a statue of the Madonna and Child enshrined in St. Andrew's Cathedral in Parañaque, Philippines. The original Spanish name is often incorrectly rendered in English as Our Lady of Good Success due to the superficial similarity between the Spanish word "suceso" (meaning "event") and the English false friend "success."

== History ==
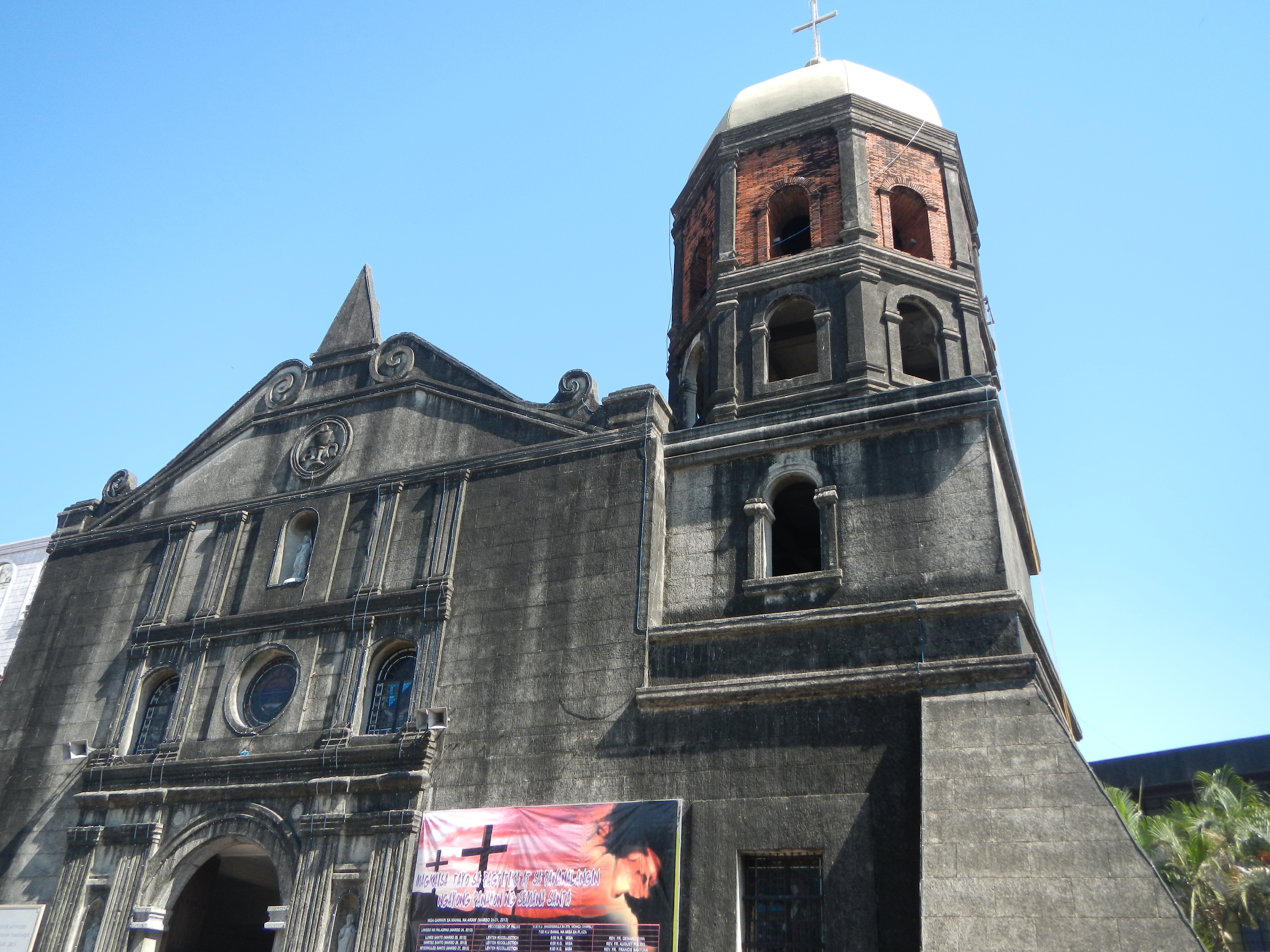
Cathedral facade

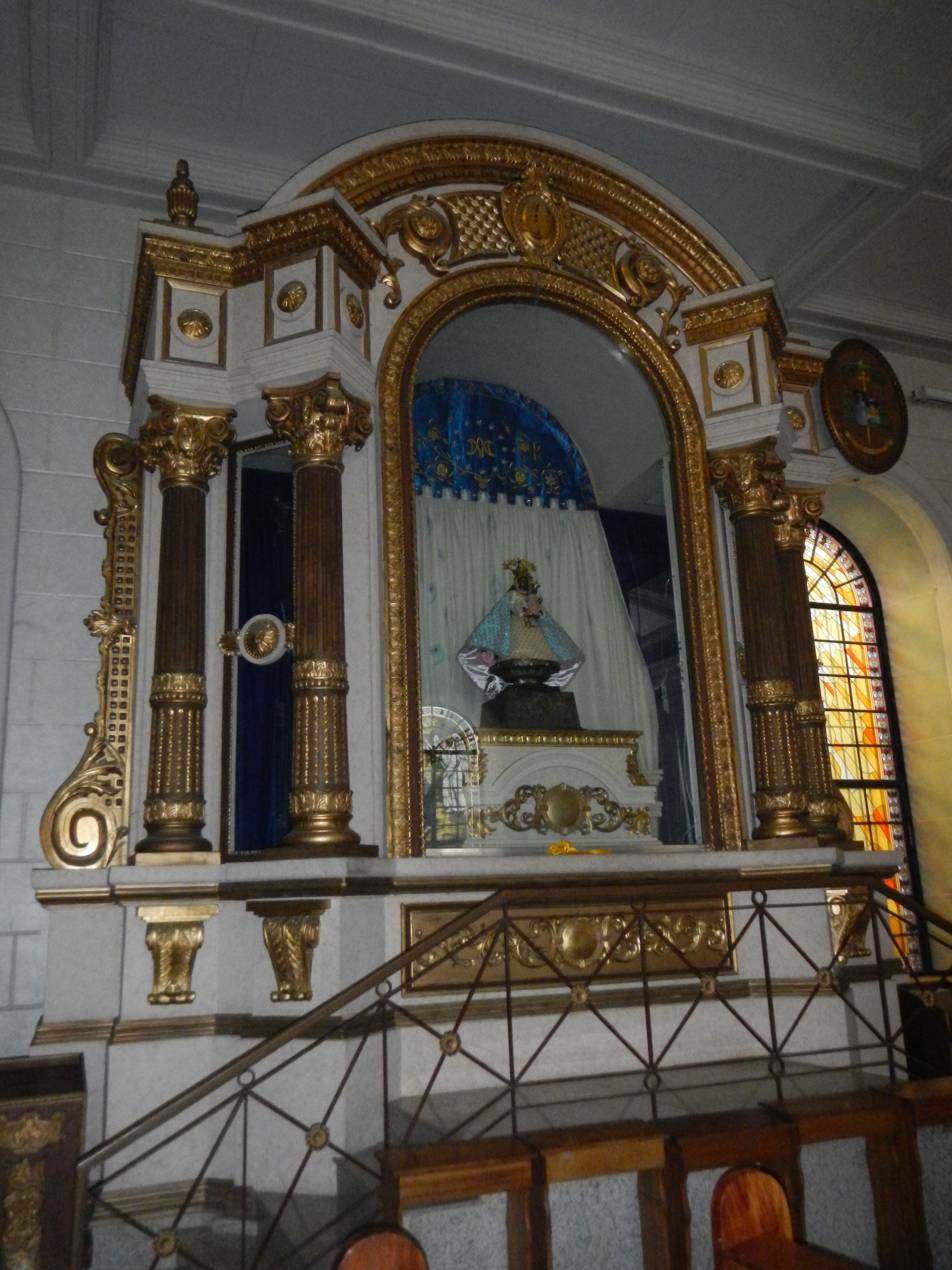
Sanctuary.

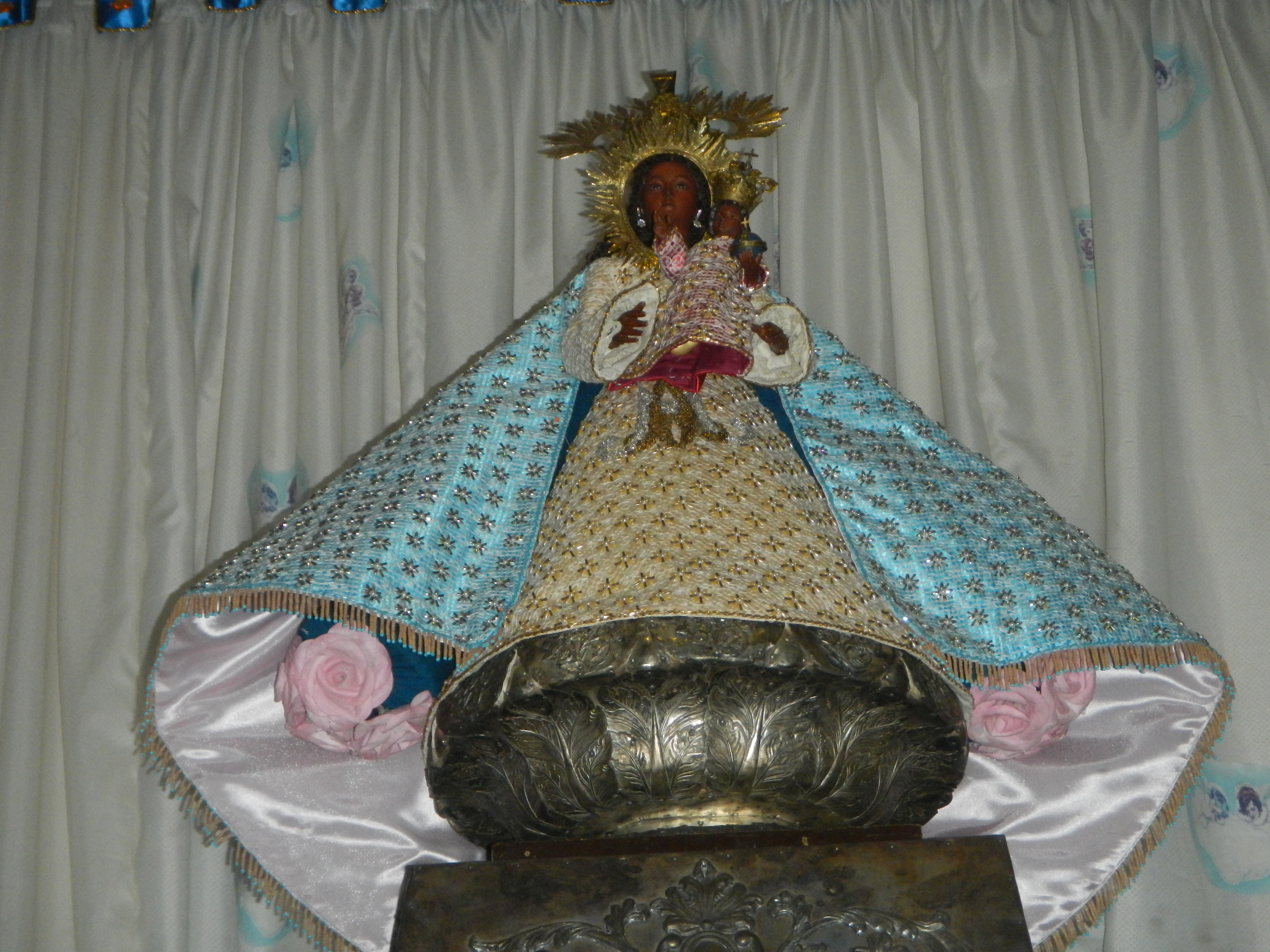
The Icon.

The history of Our Lady of Good Event of Parañaque was based on the writings of Nicolás de San Pedro, the vicar of St. Andrew's Parish (now the Cathedral Parish of St. Andrew), written in 1700.

The Augustinian fathers brought the image from Spain in 1580 as a gift from the King to Filipino converts. The Augustinians stayed in Palanyag (now Parañaque) and established St. Andrew's Parish that year. The image was left untouched and covered with dust until Catig, a poor native from Don Galo, saw this and asked the sacristan if he could take the statue home. The sacristan obliged and Catig enshrined it in his home, lighting candles in its honour.

As Catig lay dying later on, his neighbours called the priest Juan de Guevarra to administer Last Rites. Upon blessing Catig, de Guevarra saw the statue standing near the bed and asked if he could buy it for PHP 24 (note: the peso was of higher value during the Spanish Period). Catig initially refused, but then changed his mind, knowing that it would be revered by the people. De Guevarra took the statue and placed it in his own room after Catig had died.

According to de Guevarra, he saw the image emit a mysterious light and heard glorious hymns, leading him to conclude the image as being miraculous. De Guevarra reported the miracle immediately to the Augustinian Superior Alonzo de Mentrida.

=== Enthronement ===
Upon hearing de Guevarra's words, de Mentrida ordered that the icon be transported to St. Andrew's church. On August 10, 1625, a great procession was held, and the image was enshrined in the altar.

Not knowing what to call the image of Virgin Mary, de Mentrida asked the other friars to write the name of all the famous titles of the Blessed Mother in Europe on strips of paper and placed them in an urn. A young child was asked to draw the name and for six consecutive times, the title "Our Lady of Good Event" (Buen Suceso) was picked, so they named the image as such.

Archbishop of Manila Miguel García Serrano and colonial officials based in Manila arrived and venerated the image. Serrano is credited with instituting the novena and reconstructing the altar. After the reconstruction, another feast was celebrated on February 22, 1626, attended by townsfolk and those from neighboring provinces.

== Pontifical coronation ==
The original image at the 41st Intramuros Grand Marian Procession.

Pope John Paul II granted the image a decree of Canonical Coronation on 18 December 1999. The rite of coronation was executed on 8 September 2000.

Former Vice President of the Philippines, Gloria Macapagal Arroyo attended the formal event. Our Lady of Good Event is patroness of the Diocese of Parañaque along with Andrew the Apostle, to whom the cathedral is dedicated.

On 8 September 2010, an official replica by Filipino santero artisan Thomas Joven (deceased) was blessed by Manuel Gabriel during the solemn High Mass.

== Diocesan Shrine & Patroness of Parañaque ==
On August 10, 2012, celebrating her 387th enthronement anniversary and feast day, a decree of Pope Benedict XVI, with approval of Jesse E. Mercado, the bishop of the Diocese of Parañaque, stated that the Cathedral Parish of St. Andrew would be the "Diocesan Shrine of Nuestra Señora del Buen Suceso de Palanyag".

On her 12th canonical coronation anniversary on September 8, 2012, the Diocese of Parañaque declared Our Lady of Good Event of Parañaque as the official Patroness of the City of Parañaque. The Mass was attended by Parañaque City government officials and lay people.

== Feast day ==
The Cathedral Parish of St. Andrew celebrates her feast on August 10. In the Spanish times, there are several feast dates honored to "Nana Ciso," as the townsfolk called her (endearment), such as February 22 (the first feast of Nana Ciso, which was approved by the Archdiocese of Manila on that same day, year 1626), months of May and October, and December 1 (from 1892 until the breakout of World War II, her feast is celebrated on December 1 following the parish's patron feast, St. Andrew the Apostle, the day before, November 30). From the end of World War II until 2004, it was celebrated on November 29, but since 2005, it is observed on August 10 to commemorate the image's 1625 enthronement and it became her official feast day.

== Bibliography ==
- Kalendaryo ni San Francisco Xavier. 1914
- Nobena sa Karangalan ng Nuestra Señora del Buen Suceso. October 7, 1996
- The Solemn Canonical Coronation of Nuestra Señora del Buen Suceso 2000
- Siyam na Araw Para sa Karangalan ng Mahal na Birheng Buen Suceso. 2001
