= Diocese of Parañaque =

Diocese of the Catholic Church in the Philippines

Diocese of Parañaque Dioecesis Paranaquensis Diocesis de Paranaque Diyosesis ng Parañaque

Catholic
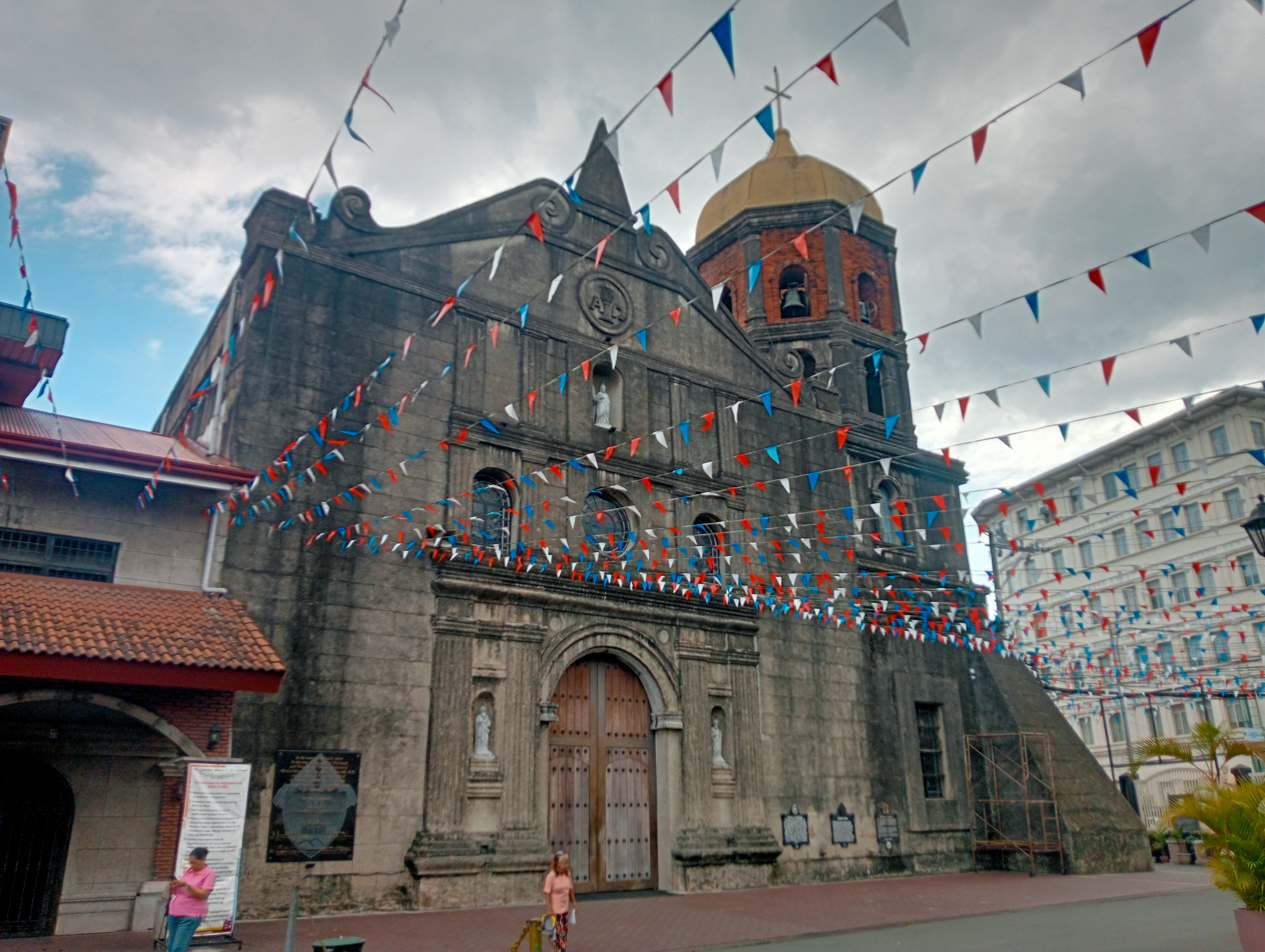
- Parañaque Cathedral

- Coat of arms

Location
- Country: Philippines
- Territory: Parañaque; Las Piñas; Muntinlupa
- Ecclesiastical province: Manila
- Metropolitan: Manila
- Headquarters: 8 Villonco Road, West Service Road; Sucat, Muntinlupa 1770
- Coordinates: 14.4488371°N 121.0405263°E

Statistics
- Area: 126 km^{2} (49 sq mi)
- Population: Total; Catholics: (as of 2021); 1,857,189; 1,476,466 (79.5%)
- Parishes: 50 (5 diocesan shrines, 3 national shrines, & 1 minor basilica)
- Churches: 58
- Congregations: 18
- Schools: 12

Information
- Denomination: Catholic
- Sui iuris church: Latin Church
- Rite: Roman Rite
- Established: December 7, 2002; 23 years ago
- Cathedral: Cathedral-Parish of Saint Andrew and Diocesan Shrine of Nuestra Señora del Buen Suceso de Palanyag
- Patron saint: Andrew the Apostle; Our Lady of the Good Event

Current leadership
- Pope: Leo XIV
- Bishop: Sede Vacante
- Metropolitan Archbishop: Jose Advincula
- Apostolic Administrator: Elias Ayuban
- Vicar General: Allen C. Aganon
- Bishops emeritus: Jesse Mercado

The Diocese of Parañaque (Latin: Dioecesis Paranaquensis; Filipino: Diyosesis ng Parañaque; Spanish: Diócesis de Parañaque) is a diocese of the Latin Church of the Catholic Church in Metro Manila, Philippines which encompasses the cities of Parañaque, Las Piñas, and Muntinlupa. Previously belonging to the Archdiocese of Manila, the Ecclesiastical District of Parañaque (formerly, PPLM) was declared an independent diocese on December 7, 2002, by Pope John Paul II by virtue of the papal bull Ad Efficacius. The district bishop, Jesse Eugenio Mercado, also one of the auxiliary bishops of Manila, was designated as its first bishop and was formally installed on January 28, 2003. He served until his retirement on July 6, 2026, his 75th birthday. The diocese is currently under sede vacante; Cubao Bishop Elias Ayuban Jr. currently serves as the diocese's apostolic administrator while awaiting its new bishop.

The diocese comprises 50 full-fledged parishes (of which five are pronounced diocesan shrines, three are national shrines, and one is a minor basilica), two quasi-parishes, and one non-parochial shrine. The Diocesan Shrine of Nuestra Señora del Buen Suceso de Palanyag – Saint Andrew Cathedral-Parish in La Huerta, Parañaque serves as the episcopal see of the diocese.

== Formation ==
On December 7, 2002, Pope John Paul II erected the Diocese of Parañaque through the Apostolic Constitution Ad efficacius, upon the recommendation of Cardinal Jaime Sin and consultation with the Catholic Bishops' Conference of the Philippines. The Apostolic Nuncio, Archbishop Antonio Franco, endorsed this request to the Congregation for Bishops, and it was considered and approved by the Pope.

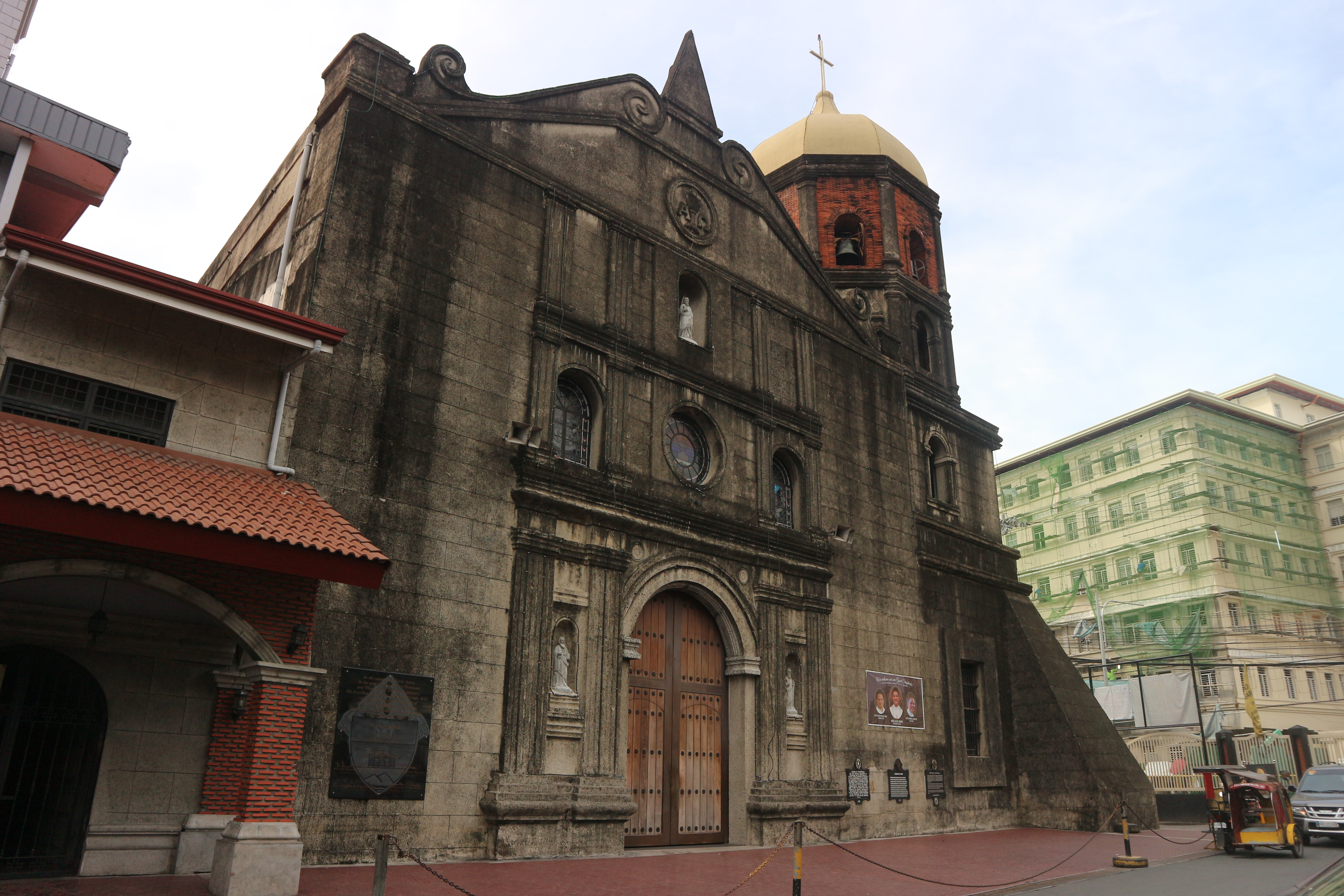
Cathedral-Parish of Saint Andrew and Diocesan Shrine of Diocesan Shrine of Nuestra Señora del Buen Suceso de Palanyag

It effectively carved the cities of Parañaque, Las Piñas, and Muntinlupa from the Archdiocese of Manila. The diocese thus became a suffragan of the archdiocese, with the archbishop of Manila as its metropolitan archbishop. The parish of Saint Andrew was raised to the rank and dignity of a cathedral as the new episcopal see. The parish is the oldest in the area, thus given the honor to be the seat of the bishop and the city where it stands became eponymous to the diocese.

Jesse Eugenio Mercado was appointed bishop of the diocese on the day of its establishment, and installed to be the first bishop of the Diocese of Parañaque on January 28, 2003.

At the time of its erection, the Diocese of Parañaque has an area of 126.50 square kilometers (48.84 sq mi) and a population of 1,381,000, of which 1,269,122 were Catholics, with 48 parishes, 46 diocesan priests, 87 religious priests, 87 male religious institutes, 61 female religious institutes, 382 educational institutions and 35 charitable institutions.

== Statistics ==
As of 2019, the total population within the territory of the diocese was 1,857,355, of whom 1,476,597 were Catholics.

There diocese has 50 parishes. Three of them, Baclaran Church, Minor Basilica and National Shrine of Mary Help of Christians in Parañaque, and the National Shrine of Our Lady of the Miraculous Medal in Muntinlupa, have been declared national shrines. Five are diocesan shrines: Diocesan Shrine of Nuestra Señora del Buen Suceso de Palanyag, Diocesan Shrine of St. Joseph Parish, Diocesan Shrine of the Five Wounds of Our Lord Jesus Christ, Diocesan Shrine of Our Lady of the Abandoned Parish and Diocesan Shrine of St. Peregrine Laziosi Parish. There are four quasi-parishes and two chaplaincies ministered to by the clergy, grouped in six vicariates: three in Parañaque, two in Las Piñas and one in Muntinlupa.

== Coat of arms ==
The miter symbolizes the pastoral authority of the bishop over the diocese, represented by the three divisions in the shield. On top is represented the first city within the diocese and its seat, Parañaque. It is symbolized by the crown with an "M" standing for the patroness of the city, Nuestra Señora del Buen Suceso de Palanyag. In the middle is Las Piñas, depicted by the internationally acclaimed Bamboo Organ housed in the parish of St. Joseph found in the said city. The third city of the jurisdiction of the diocese is Muntinlupa with the blazon of a small mountain near a body of water (canting arms for one origin of city’s name, muntíng lupà, "small land").

Red represents the Holy Spirit, and the blue, Mary. The gradation from red to blue is symbolic of the overshadowing of the Holy Spirit on Mary, thus the incarnation of Jesus (Luke 1:34). The movement from dark (color) to bright is the hope that through the episcopal ministry, the "dawn from on high shall break" (Luke 1:78) upon the people of God in the diocese.

== Ordinaries ==
Bishop		Period in office	Notes	Coat of arms
1	Jesse Eugenio Mercado	January 28, 2003 – June 6, 2026 (23 years, 129 days)	Appointed: December 7, 2002 First bishop of Parañaque (retired)	
