= Mariana de Jesús Torres =

Ecuadorian Conceptionist nun (1563–1635)

Servant of God Mariana Francisca de Jesús Torres y Berriochoa OIC
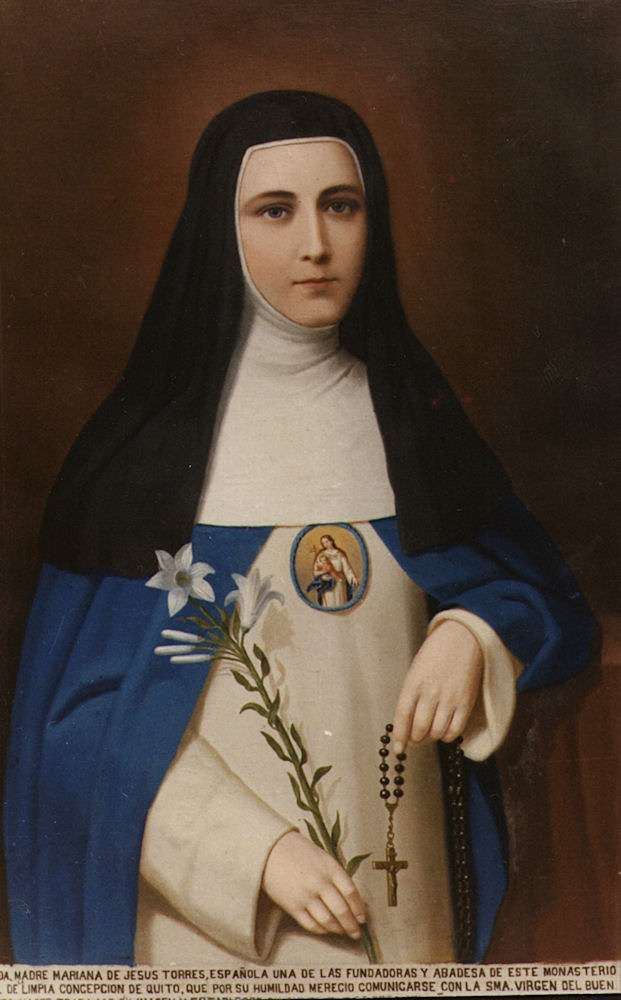
- Born: 1563; Biscay
- Residence: Quito
- Died: 16 January 1635; Quito

Mariana Francisca de Jesús Torres y Berriochoa OIC, (1563, Biscay – 16 January 1635, Quito), was an abbess of the Conceptionist Monastery of Quito from 1594 to 1635.

== Life ==
Mariana was born in 1563 in Biscaya, Spain. Her father was Diego Torres Cádiz and her mother was María Berriochoa Álvaro. In 1577 a new Conceptionists monastery was established in Quito, and Maria de Jesus y Taboada (Mariana's aunt) was appointed as the first abbess. Mariana and four other sisters of the order accompanied her on the trip from Spain to Ecuador. On 21 September, 1579, she took perpetual vows.

Her aunt died on 4 October 1594 and Mariana succeeded her as abbess. Around 1610 she had a statue carved of Our Lady of the Good Event. Mariana died on 16 January 1635.

== Apparition in Ecuador (1594-1634) ==
Mariana claimed to have received marian apparitions from 2 February 1594 to 2 February 1634 in Quito. 2 February is the feast day of the Purification of Mary and the Presentation of Jesus. In 1611, the local bishop, Salvador Ribera Avalos, gave his approval to the apparitions that had occurred up to that point. To this day this event is referred to as Our Lady of the Good Event

== Veneration ==
The sarcophagus with her incorrupt relics was uncovered on 8 February 1906. In 1984 the Archdiocese of Quito opened a cause for the possible canonization of Mariana de Jesús Torres, identifying her as a Servant of God. In 1986 a diocesan tribunal was established.
