= Our Lady of the Good Event =

Marian apparition occurring in 16th-century Ecuador

Our Lady of Good Success Our Lady of Good Success
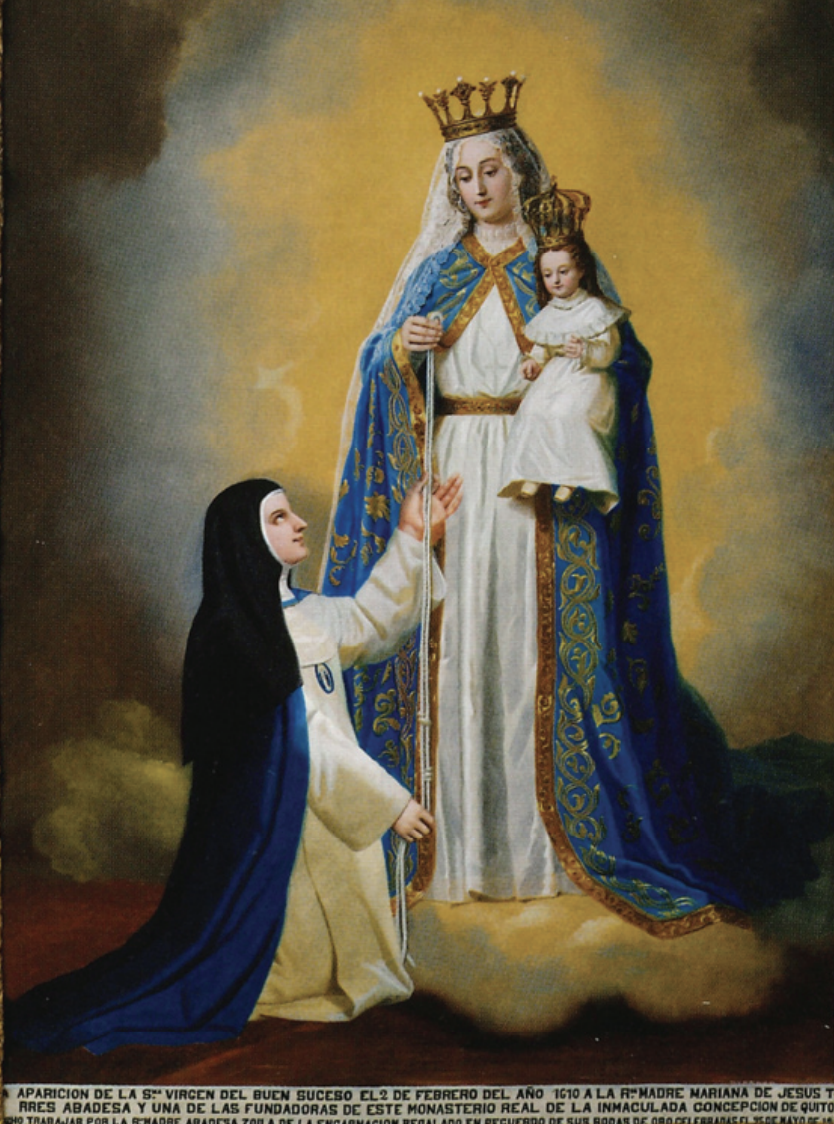
- The Virgin Mary, as Our Lady of Good Success, appearing to Mother Mariana
- Location: Quito, Ecuador
- Date: 2 February 1594 to 2 February 1634
- Witness: Mariana de Jesús Torres
- Type: Marian apparition
- Venerated in: Catholic Church
- Shrine: Convent of the Immaculate Conception in Quito

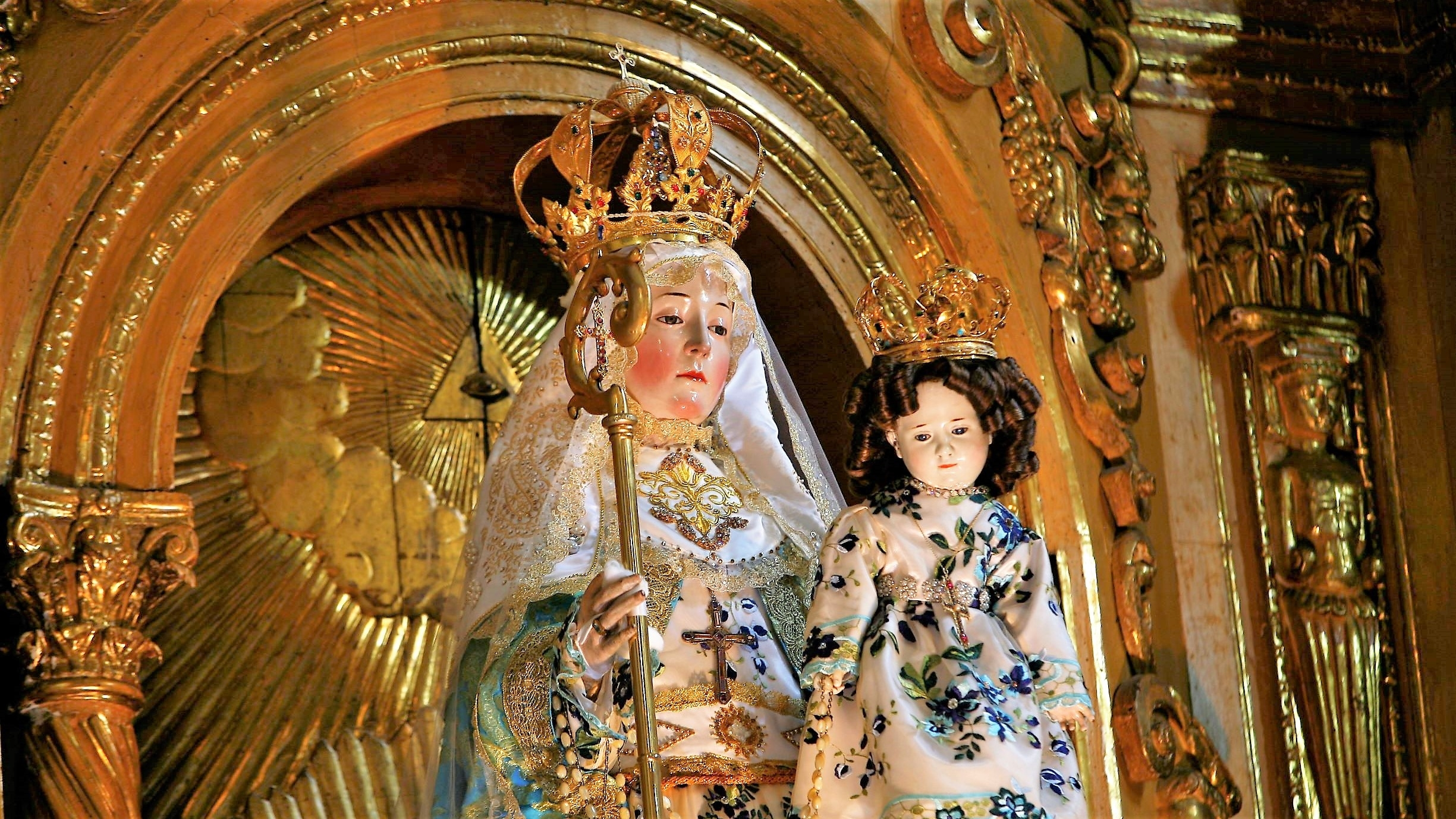
Original statue of Our Lady of Good Success in Quito, Ecuador

Our Lady of Good Success (Spanish: Nuestra Señora del Buen Suceso; Portuguese: Nossa Senhora do Bom Sucesso) is a Catholic Marian title. The phrase "Good Success" refers to the Purification of Mary and the Presentation of Jesus.

== Background ==
In 1577 a new Conceptionist nuns monastery was established in Quito, Ecuador, and Maria de Jesus y Taboada (Mariana's aunt) was appointed as the first abbess. Her fourteen year old niece Mariana and four sisters of the order accompanied her on the trip from Spain to Ecuador. On 21 September, 1579, Mariana took perpetual vows and the religious name Sister Mariana of Jesus.

Mother Maria de Jesus died on 4 October 1594 and Sister Mariana succeeded her as abbess. Between 1594 and 1634 Mariana purportedly experienced apparitions of the Blessed Virgin Mary under the title of the Good Success.

== Apparition in Ecuador (1594-1634) ==
Servant of God Mariana de Jesús Torres OIC
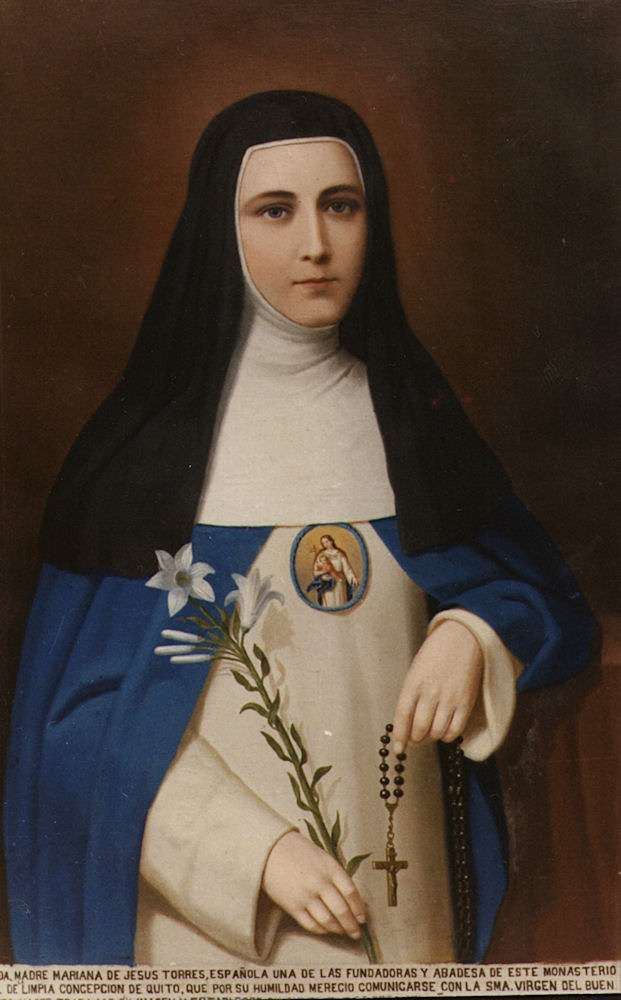

Virgin
- Died: 16 January 1635
- Venerated in: Archdiocese of Quito

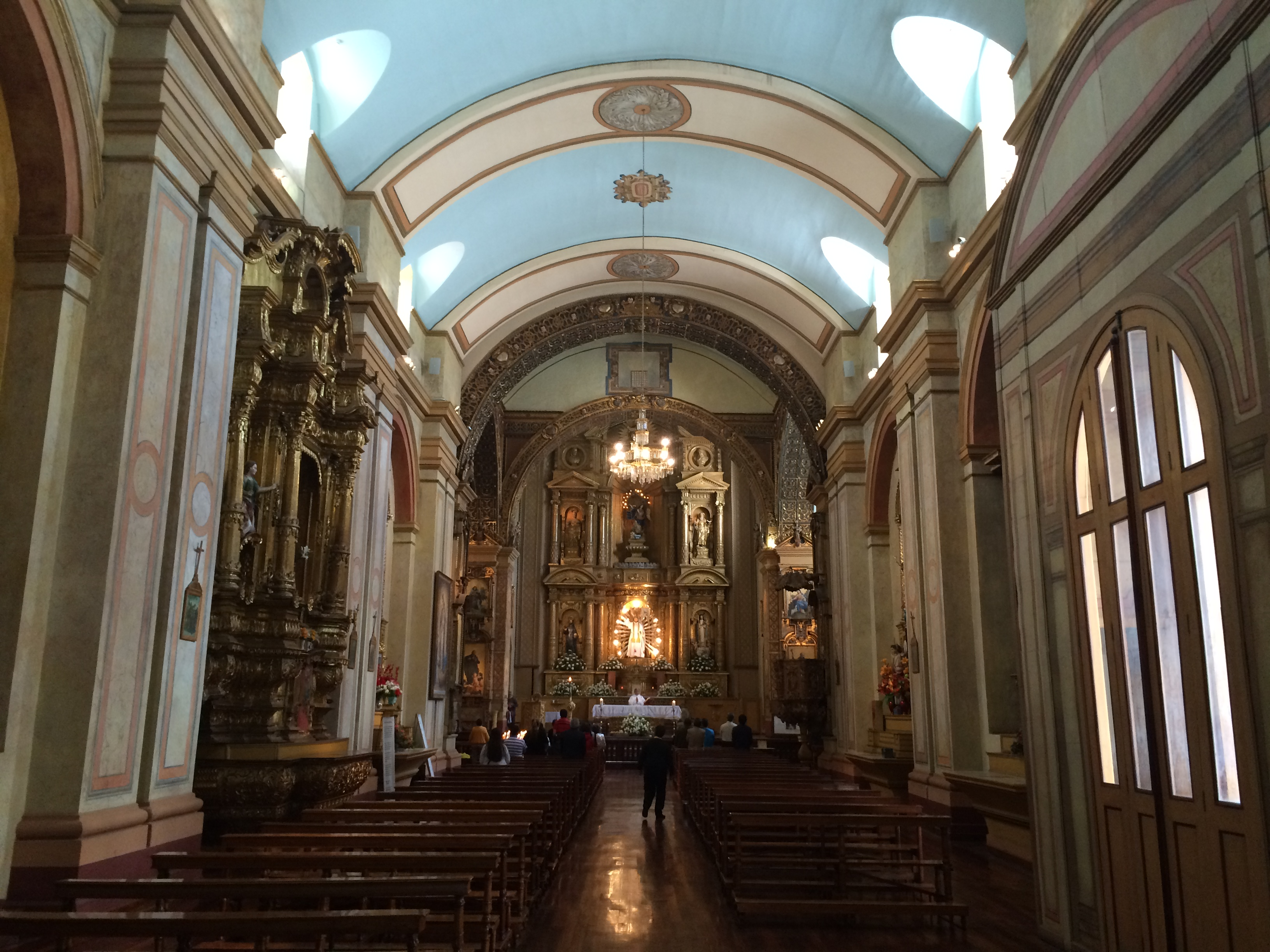
Church of the Immaculate Conception in Quito.

A Conceptionist sister named Mariana Francisca de Jesús Torres [it] claimed to have received Marian apparitions under this title from 2 February 1594 to 2 February 1634 in Quito. (Note: 2 February is the feast day of the Purification of Mary and the Presentation of Jesus, the event with which the title is associated.) In 1611, the local bishop, Salvador Ribera Avalos, gave his approval to the apparitions that had occurred up to that point.

Torres died on 16 January 1635, shortly after the last alleged apparition. When her tomb was reopened in 1906, her body was found to be incorrupt. The Archdiocese of Quito opened her cause for canonization in 1984 and finished the diocesan stage of the process in 1997.

=== Prophetic messages ===
The apparition messages of Our Lady of Good Success reportedly predicted a "spiritual catastrophe" in the Catholic Church and in society, beginning "shortly after the middle of the 20th century", including:

- Widespread moral corruption
- Profanation of the Sacrament of Matrimony
- Depraved priests who will scandalize the faithful and cause suffering for good priests
- Unbridled lust which will ensnare many souls
- Loss of innocence among children and loss of modesty among women
- Lack of priestly and religious vocations
- A period of catastrophe followed by a period of restoration.

On 8 December 1634, the apparition supposedly predicted that papal infallibility "will be declared a dogma of the Faith by the same Pope chosen to proclaim the dogma of the Mystery of My Immaculate Conception." In 1854, Pope Pius IX defined the dogma of the Immaculate Conception, and in 1870, he declared the dogma of papal infallibility as defined by the First Vatican Council. (Note: In the Catholic Church, an ecumenical council possesses its authority by virtue of its decrees being promulgated by the Roman Pontiff.)

On 7 January 1991, the shrine was elevated of Archdiocesan Marian Sanctuary and under diocesan authority, granted the coronation of the statue. On February 2 of the same year, the statue was solemnly crowned as filial homage to the fervent devotion and rendering of thanks to the Mother of God on behalf of the religious community of the Convent and of the devotees of the city of Quito and of the whole archdiocese.

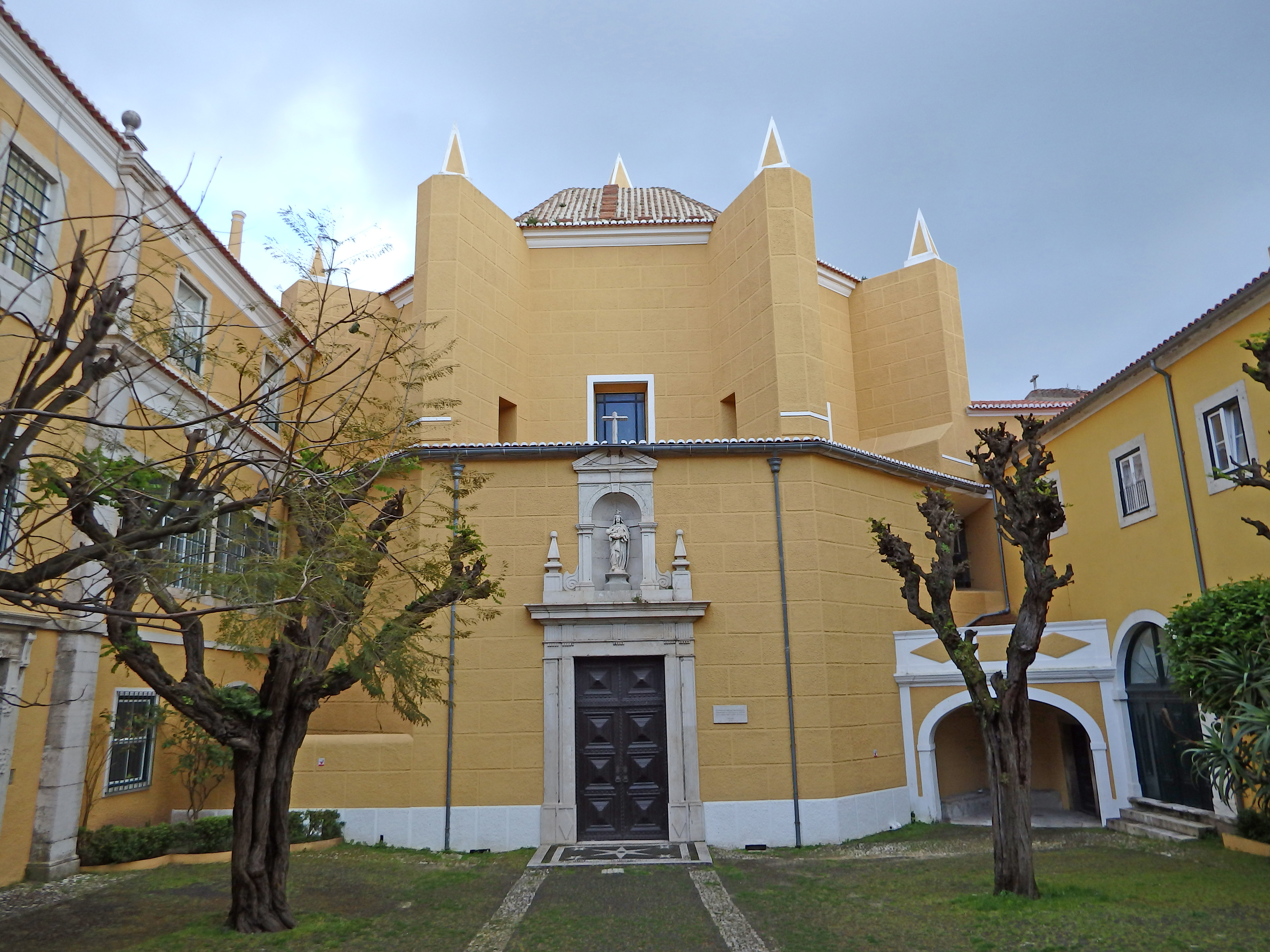
Bom Sucesso Convent in Lisbon

== Statue in the Philippines ==
The devotion in the Philippines, under a similar name, is separate from that of Quito. A statue of Mary under the title of "Our Lady of Good Success of Parañaque" is enshrined in St. Andrew's Cathedral in Parañaque, Philippines. Mary is also patroness of the city under this title.
