= Our Lady of Good Success =

Title for the Virgin Mary

Our Lady of Good Success (Spanish: Nuestra Señora de la Buena Suerte) is a Catholic Marian title associated with Marian images located in the Spanish cities of Granada and Zaragoza, the island of La Gomera, and the region of Catalonia. The seaside location of many of these images suggests that Spanish sailors would invoke Mary under this title specifically to petition for safe voyages.

== 16th-century church in Madrid ==
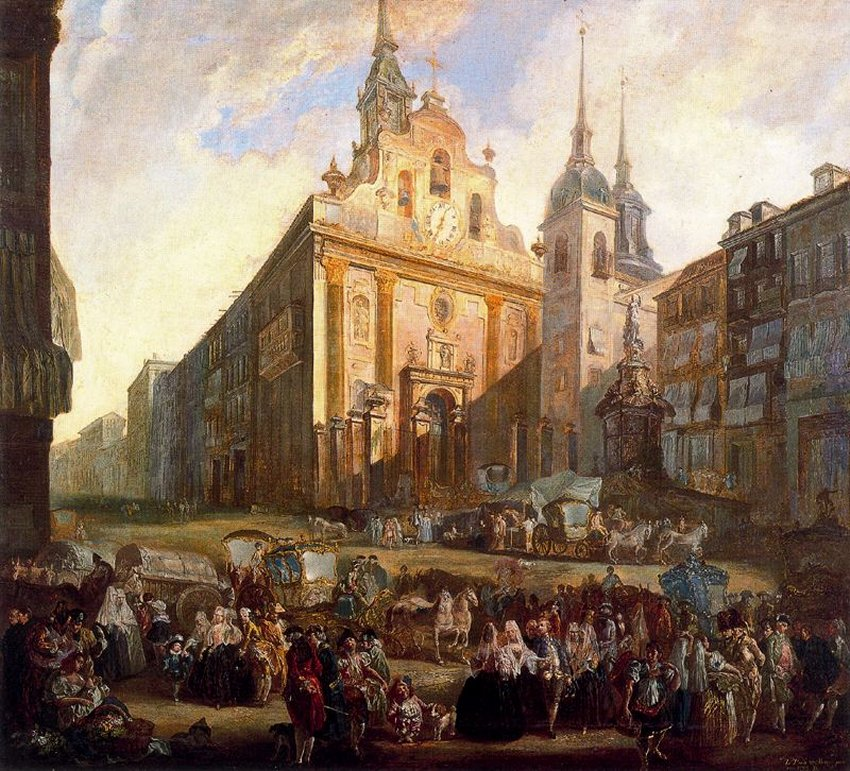
Church of Nuestra Señora del Buen Suceso, as it once existed in Madrid, Spain

The Obregonians were a small Roman Catholic congregation of men, founded in Madrid by Bernardino de Obregón, and dedicated to the care of the sick. Their motherhouse was adjacent to the Church of Buen Suceso, which had originally been built around 1529 as the Hospital Real de la Corte (Royal Hospital of the Court). Since 1590 the structure was rebuilt as a new church and hospital. Around 1607, Pope Paul V presented the Obregonians with a statue of the Virgin, entitled Virgen del Buen Suceso. Copies of the image were produced and veneration of Mary under this title spread throughout Spain and its territories.

== Buen Suceso conflated with Buena Suerte ==
Among English speakers, this title (Buena Suerte) is often confused with a similar title, Nuestra Señora del Buen Suceso (meaning Our Lady of the Good Event), due to the superficial similarity between "success" in English and "suceso" in Spanish. The Buen Suceso title, however, refers specifically to the "good event" of the Purification of Mary and the Presentation of Jesus.
