= Las Piñas =

Highly urbanized city in Metro Manila, Philippines

- Highly urbanized city
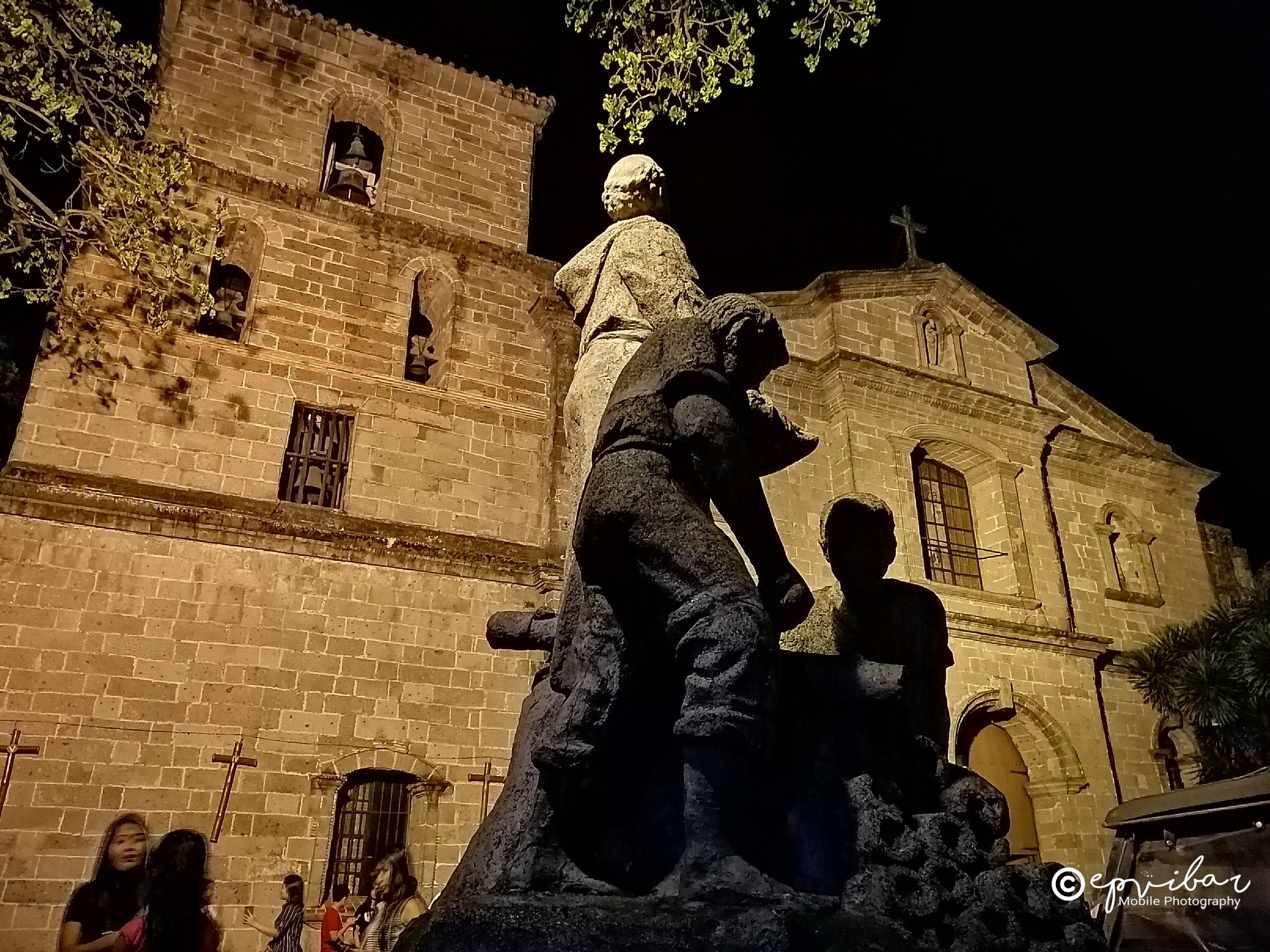
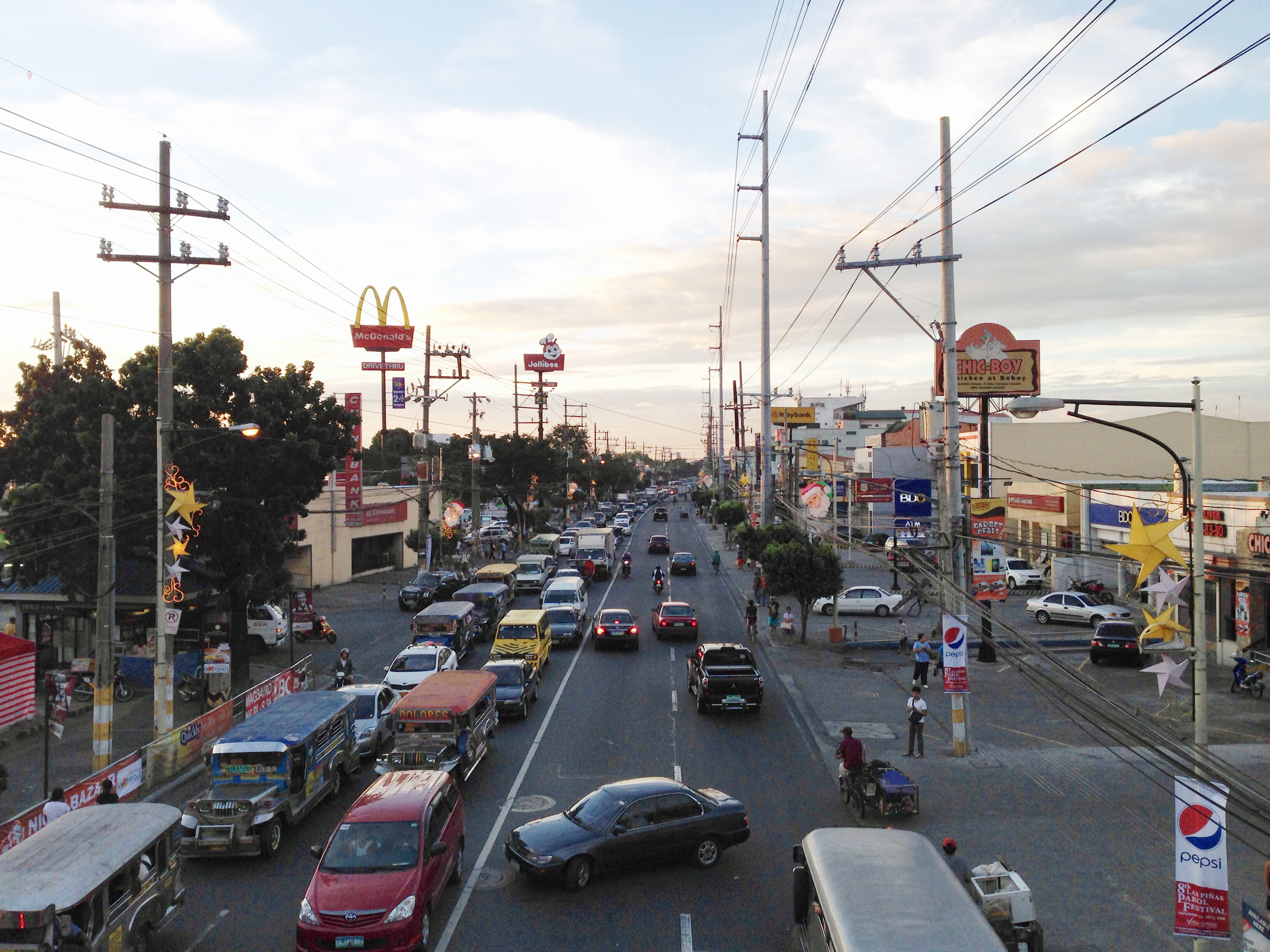
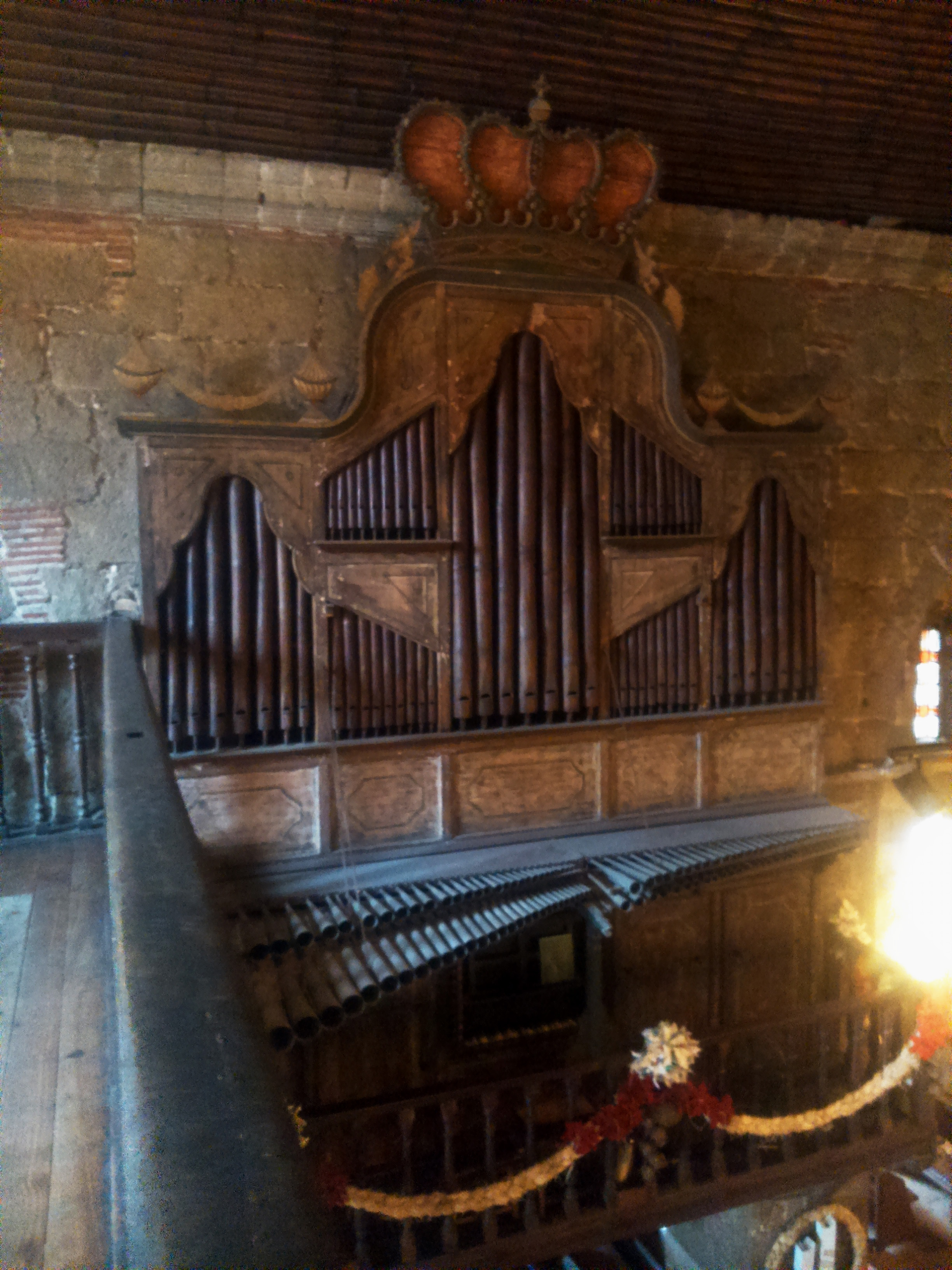
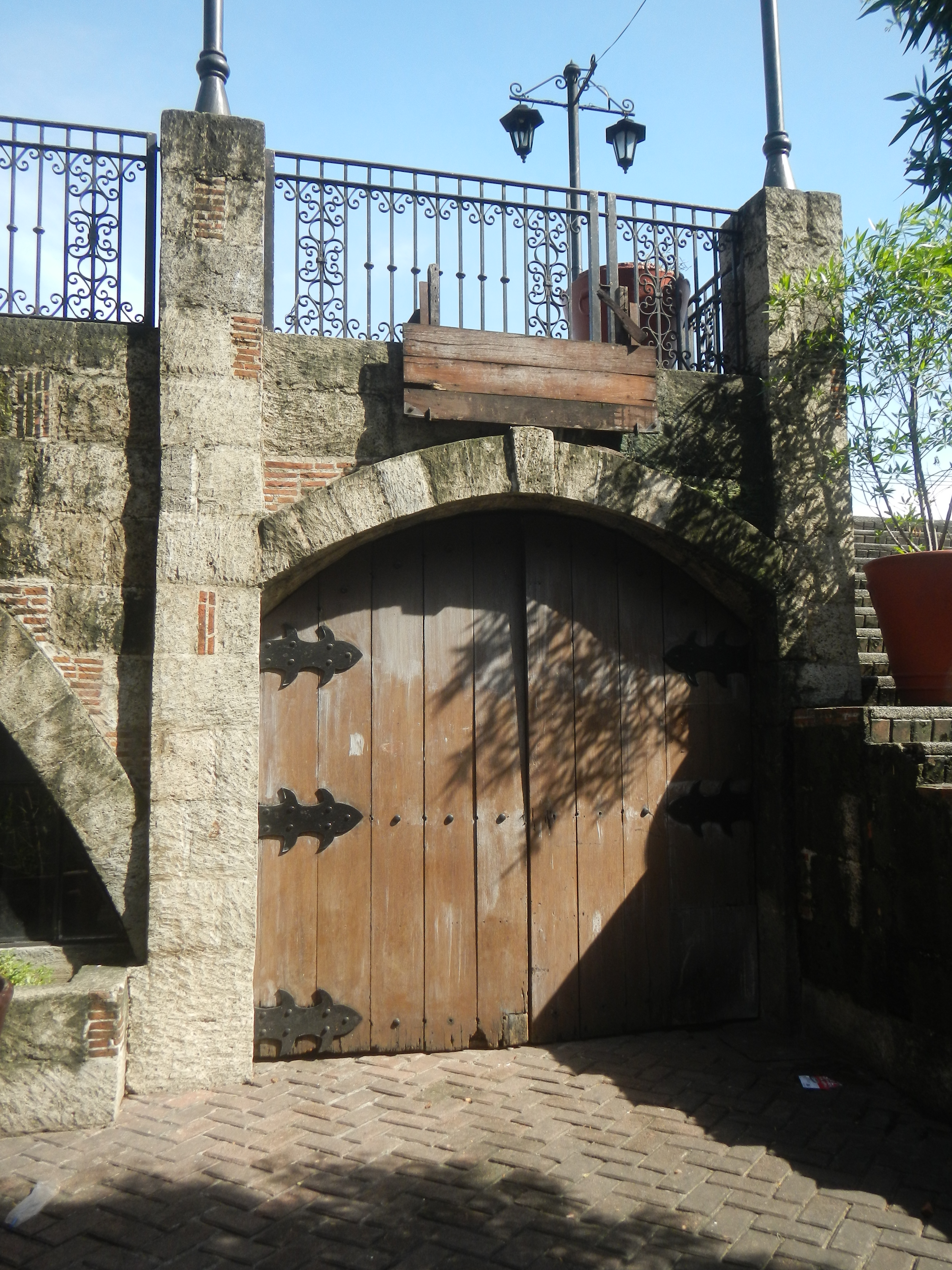
- Left to right from top: Las Piñas church, Alabang–Zapote Road, SM Southmall, Bamboo Organ, Plaza Rizal Las Piñas

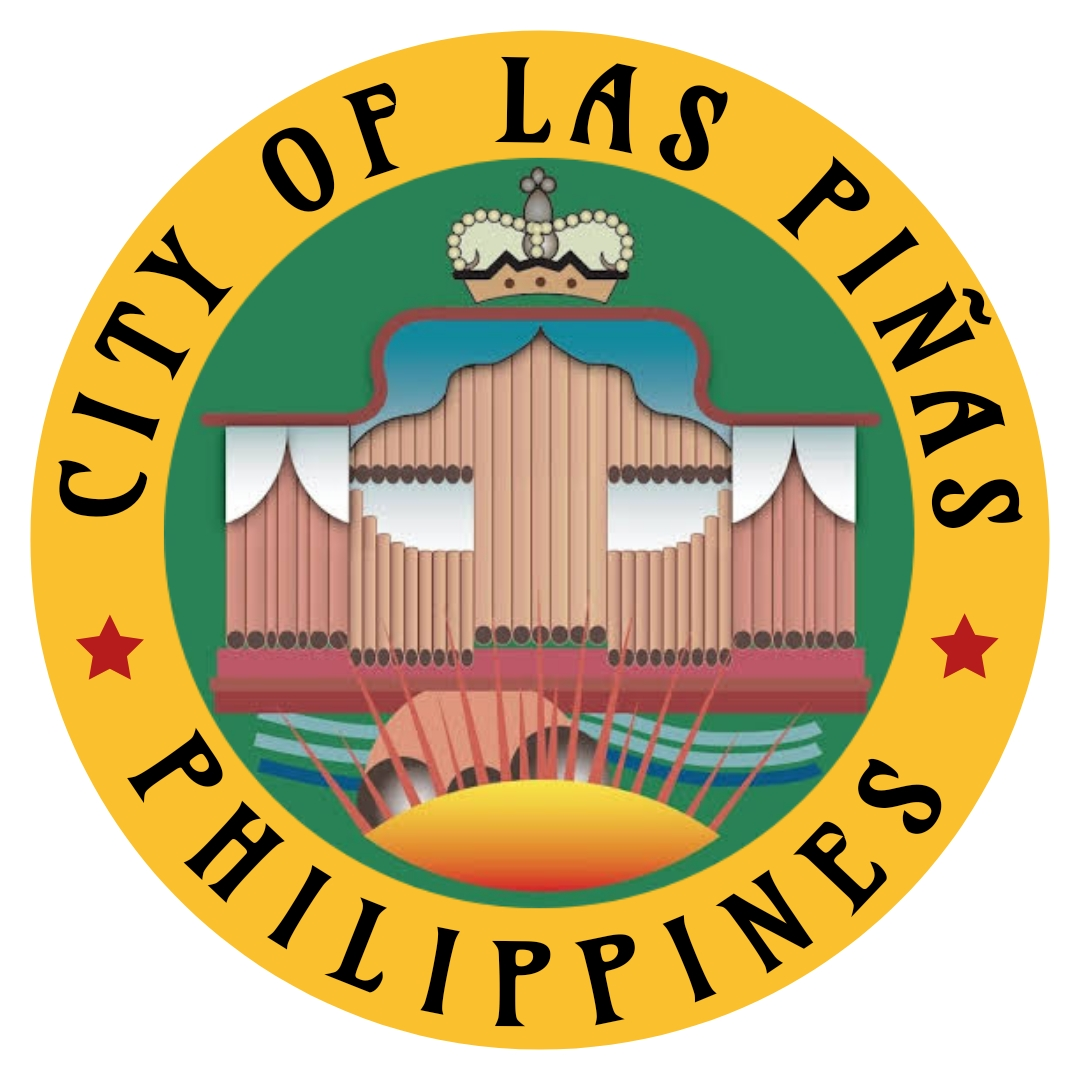
- Seal
- Nickname: Home of the Bamboo Organ
- Motto(s): Las Piñas, Our Home
- Map of Metro Manila with Las Piñas highlighted
- Interactive map of Las Piñas
- Location within the Philippines
- Coordinates: 14°27′N 120°59′E
- Country: Philippines
- Region: Metro Manila
- Province: none
- District: Lone district
- Founded: 1762 or 1797
- Annexation to Parañaque: October 12, 1903
- Chartered: March 27, 1907
- Cityhood and HUC: March 26, 1997
- Barangays: 20 (see Barangays)

Government
  - Type: Sangguniang Panlungsod
  - Mayor: April T. Aguilar (NPC)
  - Vice Mayor: Imelda T. Aguilar (NPC)
  - Representative: Mark Anthony G. Santos (Independent)
  - Councilors: List: 1st District; Mark Anthony Santos; John Jess Bustamante; Felimon Aguilar III; Rex Hans Riguera; Oscar Peña; Florante Dela Cruz; 2nd District; Henry Medina; Luis Bustamante; Ruben Ramos; Lord Linley Aguilar; Danilo Hernandez; Emmanuel Luis Casimiro; ABC President; Mori Riguera; SK Federation President; Rey Angelo Reyes
  - Electorate: 318,542 voters (2025)

Area
  - Total: 32.69 km^{2} (12.62 sq mi)
- Elevation: 25 m (82 ft)
- Highest elevation: 119 m (390 ft)
- Lowest elevation: 0 m (0 ft)

Population (2024 census)
  - Total: 615,549
  - Density: 18,830/km^{2} (48,770/sq mi)
  - Households: 156,899
- Demonym: Las Piñero

Economy
  - Income class: 1st city income class
  - Poverty incidence: 1.3% (2023)
  - Revenue: ₱ 4,356 million (2024)
  - Assets: ₱ 13,818 million (2024)
  - Expenditure: ₱ 3,632 million (2024)
  - Liabilities: ₱ 3,580 million (2024)

Service provider
  - Electricity: Manila Electric Company (Meralco)
  - Water: Maynilad Water Services
- Time zone: UTC+08:00 (PST)
- PSGC: 1380200000
- IDD : area code: +63 (0)02
- Native languages: Filipino
- Website: www.laspinascity.gov.ph

Las Piñas (Tagalog: [las ˈpiɲɐs]), officially the City of Las Piñas (Filipino: Lungsod ng Las Piñas), is a highly urbanized city in the National Capital Region of the Philippines. According to the 2024 census, it has a population of 615,549 people.

Las Piñas was sixth in MoneySense Philippines "Best Places To Live" report in 2008. Attractions include Evia Lifestyle Center, SM Southmall, Robinsons Place Las Piñas and Las Piñas - Parañaque Wetland Park.

== Etymology ==
The story about the true origin of the city's name, "Las Piñas", varies. One version mentioned, that traders from the province of Cavite and Batangas shipped their first piñas (Spanish for pineapples) for sale to this town before they were distributed to nearby markets. Another version claims the original name was Las Peñas (“the rocks”), as the area was a quarry for stone and adobe used to construct buildings and bridges. The old church bell of Saint Joseph Parish Church founded by Diego Cera has been preserved inside the church museum. An inscription on the bell reads, "Siendo cura del pueblo de Laspeñas el M.R.P. Padre Diego Cera se fundió este equilón año de 1820", showing even during Cera’s day as the first parish priest, the town was called "Las Peñas" and eventually renamed "Las Piñas".

== History ==
=== Spanish colonial era ===
Las Piñas was one of the earliest fishing settlements on the shores of Manila Bay. It was proclaimed as a province of Manila either in 1762 or 1797. Agustin, a Spanish historian, and Fr. Juan de Medina placed it at 1762. Las Piñas was formerly called "Las Pilas" due to its separation from Parañaque due to tribal conflicts. On the other hand, Manuel Buzeta recorded the date at 1797. Felix Timbang was the first gobernadorcillo in 1762, while Mariano Ortiz was the first municipal president of the town of Las Piñas.

Las Piñas is famous for its Bamboo Organ, which was built by Fr. Diego Cera and completed in 1824. In 1880, the city experienced an outbreak of cholera and smallpox leading to the loss of many lives. Years later, Las Piñas also became a central battleground between Spanish and Philippine forces during the Philippine Revolution.

The town of Las Piñas was also a major war theater during the 1896 Philippine Revolution, as it was occupied by forces of General Emilio Aguinaldo.

=== American invasion era ===
In 1901, the municipality of Las Piñas, previously a part of the province of Manila, was incorporated to the newly created province of Rizal pursuant to the Philippine Commission Act No. 137. On October 12, 1903, in accordance with Act No. 942, it was combined with the town of Parañaque, with the latter as the seat of a new municipal government.

It was separated from Parañaque to become an independent municipality again on March 27, 1907, by virtue of Philippine Commission Act No. 1625.

=== Japanese occupation era ===
The town was occupied by the Japanese during World War II and liberated by the combined American and Filipino forces.

=== Philippine independence ===
On November 7, 1975, through Presidential Decree No. 824, Las Piñas was excised from the province of Rizal to form Metro Manila. Las Piñas became one of the municipalities making up the region.

In the 1980s, economic growth erupted due to the advent of the construction of Coastal Road. Las Piñas currently serves as the proper gateway to Calabarzon.

In the 1990s, Las Piñas was known for its rampant illegal drug trade. In an October 1989 privileged speech, Senator Ernesto F. Herrera shared the National Bureau of Investigation's findings that an estimated 40% of Las Piñas' police force was connected with a drug cartel. In 1995, then-Councilor Yoyoy Villame criticized the town's image as the "Drug Capital of the Philippines", while NCR Command Director Job Mayo alleged upon his appointment in early 1996 that the town's police force had the most drug-dependent police officers in the metropolis.

=== Cityhood ===
On February 12, 1997, President Fidel V. Ramos signed the bill which elevated Las Piñas from municipality into a city. A plebiscite was held a month after approved the city status by its residents, and Las Piñas became the 10th city of Metro Manila on March 26, 1997. It has been a city for 29 years.

=== 2024 plebiscite and later events ===
In 2023, the Sangguniang Panlungsod enacted City Ordinance No. 1941-23 Series of 2023 which sets the territorial boundaries of the 20 barangays Department of Environment and Natural Resources' based on the March 2015 Cadastre survey. Accordingly, the Commission on Elections scheduled the plebiscite for the Ordinance Ratification on June 29, 2024. It also set the gun control from May 28 until July 6, the alcohol ban on June 28 to 29, and the 20 barangays "pulong-pulong" from May 28 to June 27.

On June 30, the Commission on Elections reported that 41,493 (67%) registered voters voted “yes” while 19,498 said “no” against City Ordinance No. 1941-23. The City Plebiscite Board of Canvassers proclaimed the ratification by the majority of the votes cast on June 29. However, voter turnout was only 61,237 or 20% of the 308,059 registered voters.

== Geography ==
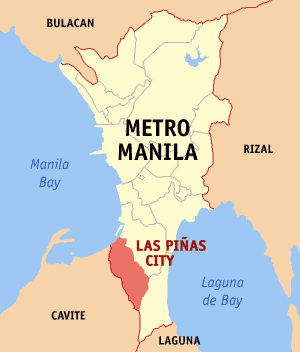
Previous Las Piñas map in 2003

Las Piñas is bounded to the northeast by Parañaque; to the southeast by Muntinlupa; to the west by Bacoor; to the southwest by Dasmariñas; and to the northwest by Manila Bay. Half of its land area is residential and the remaining half is used for commercial, industrial and institutional purposes. The present physiography of Las Piñas consists of three zones: Manila Bay, the coastal margin and the Guadalupe Plateau.

=== Climate ===
Climate data for Las Piñas
| Month | Jan | Feb | Mar | Apr | May | Jun | Jul | Aug | Sep | Oct | Nov | Dec | Year |
|---|---|---|---|---|---|---|---|---|---|---|---|---|---|
| Mean daily maximum °C (°F) | 29 (84) | 30 (86) | 32 (90) | 34 (93) | 32 (90) | 31 (88) | 29 (84) | 29 (84) | 29 (84) | 30 (86) | 30 (86) | 29 (84) | 30 (87) |
| Mean daily minimum °C (°F) | 21 (70) | 20 (68) | 21 (70) | 22 (72) | 24 (75) | 24 (75) | 24 (75) | 24 (75) | 24 (75) | 23 (73) | 22 (72) | 21 (70) | 23 (73) |
| Average precipitation mm (inches) | 10 (0.4) | 10 (0.4) | 12 (0.5) | 27 (1.1) | 94 (3.7) | 153 (6.0) | 206 (8.1) | 190 (7.5) | 179 (7.0) | 120 (4.7) | 54 (2.1) | 39 (1.5) | 1,094 (43) |
| Average rainy days | 5.2 | 4.5 | 6.4 | 9.2 | 19.7 | 24.3 | 26.9 | 25.7 | 24.4 | 21.0 | 12.9 | 9.1 | 189.3 |
Source: Meteoblue

=== Districts and barangays ===
Las Piñas is politically subdivided into 20 barangays. These barangays are grouped into two legislative districts, each with its own set of representatives in the city council. District 1 comprises the northwestern half of the city while District 2, the remaining half.

Las Piñas was historically divided into 8 barrios which later became the 9 original barangays: Almanza, Daniel Fajardo, Elias Aldana, Ilaya, Manuyo, Pamplona, Pulanglupa, Talon, and Zapote. They were later reorganized by former President Ferdinand Marcos Sr. in 1978 through Presidential Decree Nos. 1130-1140.

Barangays Pulang-Lupa, Manuyo, Pamplona, Talon, and Almanza were the "original" barangays that later became 16 barangays while barangays Daniel Fajardo, Elias Aldana, Ilaya, and Zapote remained unchanged. Below is the list of original barangays, their new names, and their respective extensions:

- Pulang-Lupa was renamed to Pulang-Lupa Uno while the newly created one was named Pulang-Lupa Dos.
- Manuyo was renamed to Manuyo Uno while the newly created one was named Manuyo Dos.
- Pamplona was renamed Pamplona Uno while the newly created ones were named Pamplona Dos and Pamplona Tres.
- Talon was renamed Talon Uno while the newly created ones were named BF International Village, Talon Dos,Talon Tres, Talon Kuatro, and Talon Singko.
- Almanza was renamed Almanza Uno while the newly created ones were named Almanza Dos and Pilar Village.

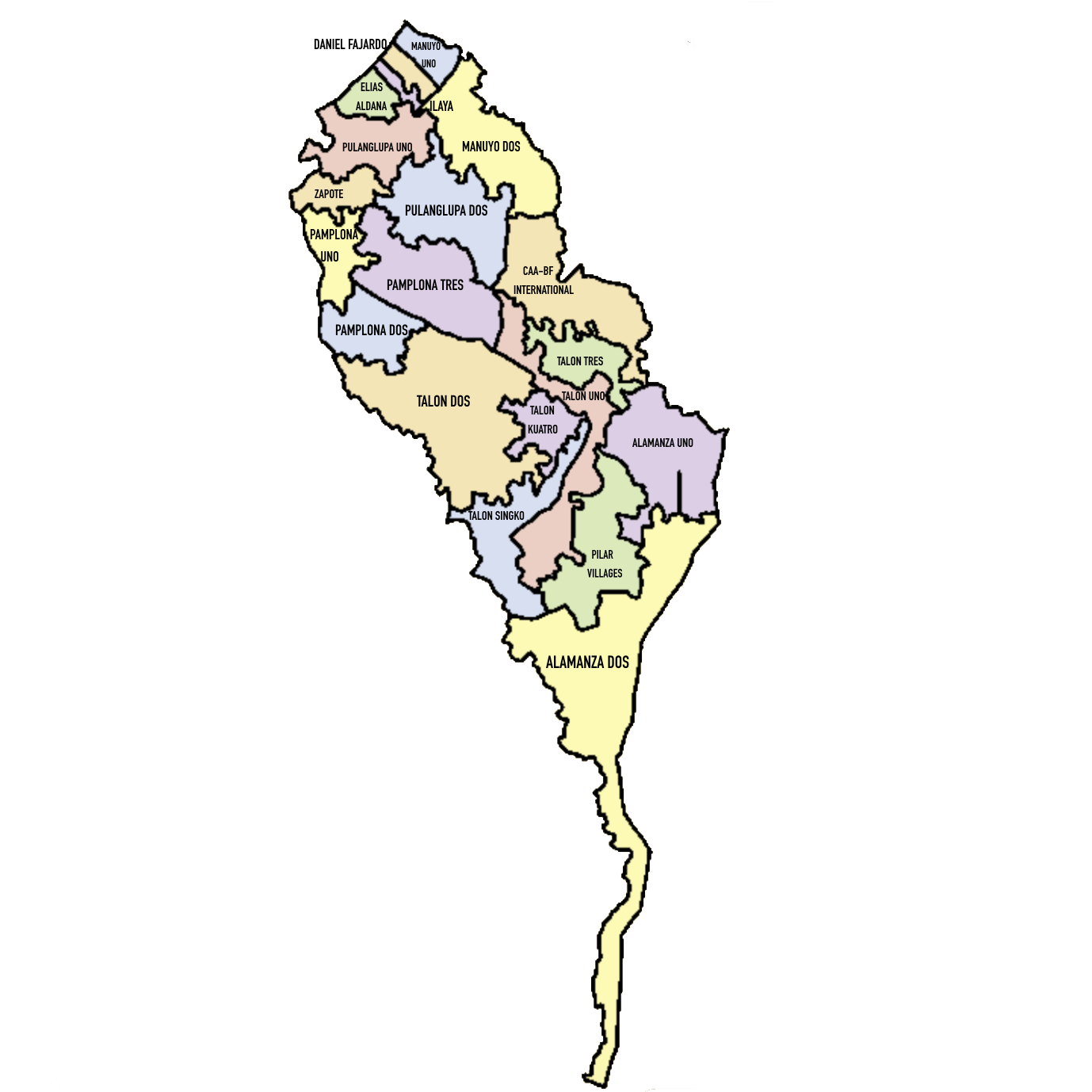
Barangay map of Las Piñas according to the June 29, 2024 plebiscite

| Barangays | District | Population (2020) | Area (km^{2}) | Density (/km^{2}) (2020) | Zip Code |
|---|---|---|---|---|---|
| Almanza Uno | 2nd | 36,232 | 2.341 | 15,479 | 1748, 1750 |
| Almanza Dos | 2nd | 37,432 | 4.849 | 7,720 | 1750, 1751 |
| BF International Village | 1st | 81,739 | 2.394 | 34,150 | |
| Daniel Fajardo | 1st | 10,629 | 0.3204 | 33,170 | |
| Elias Aldana | 1st | 10,275 | 0.4077 | 25,205 | |
| Ilaya | 1st | 7,103 | 0.1404 | 50,591 | |
| Manuyo Uno | 1st | 14,794 | 1.095 | 13,511 | 1744 |
| Manuyo Dos | 1st | 44,351 | 1.691 | 26,234 | 1744, 1745 |
| Pamplona Uno | 1st | 19,085 | 0.8223 | 23,209 | |
| Pamplona Dos | 2nd | 9,141 | 1.127 | 8,113 | 1741 |
| Pamplona Tres | 1st | 35,098 | 2.343 | 14,979 | 1740, 1746 |
| Pilar | 2nd | 29,780 | 1.934 | 15,397 | |
| Pulang Lupa Uno | 1st | 38,405 | 1.428 | 26,888 | 1742 |
| Pulang Lupa Dos | 1st | 32,485 | 1.989 | 16,333 | 1742 |
| Talon Uno | 1st | 42,505 | 1.197 | 35,502 | 1747 |
| Talon Dos | 2nd | 43,978 | 4.100 | 10,726 | 1747 |
| Talon Tres | 2nd | 32,963 | 1.493 | 22,074 | 1747 |
| Talon Kuatro | 2nd | 20,763 | 0.7103 | 29,233 | 1747, 1749 |
| Talon Singko | 2nd | 38,684 | 1.764 | 21,933 | 1747 |
| Zapote | 1st | 20,851 | 0.5971 | 34,920 | 1742 |

== Demographics ==
Population census of Las Piñas
| Year | Pop. | ±% p.a. |
|---|---|---|
| 1903 | 2,762 | — |
| 1918 | 2,872 | +0.26% |
| 1939 | 6,822 | +4.21% |
| 1948 | 9,280 | +3.48% |
| 1960 | 16,093 | +4.69% |
| 1970 | 45,732 | +11.00% |
| 1975 | 81,610 | +12.32% |
| 1980 | 136,514 | +10.83% |
| 1990 | 297,102 | +8.09% |
| 1995 | 413,086 | +6.37% |
| 2000 | 472,780 | +2.94% |
| 2007 | 532,330 | +1.65% |
| 2010 | 552,573 | +1.37% |
| 2015 | 588,894 | +1.22% |
| 2020 | 606,293 | +0.61% |
| 2024 | 615,549 | +0.36% |
Source: Philippine Statistics Authority

As of the 2024 census, Las Piñas has a population of 615,549, with a density of 18,830 inhabitants per square kilometre or 48,770 inhabitants per square mile.

=== Demonym ===
The demonym of Las Piñas is Las Piñero.

=== Language ===
The native language of Las Piñas is Tagalog, but the majority of the residents understand and speak English.

=== Religion ===
People in Las Piñas are mainly Roman Catholic. Catholic churches in Las Piñas fall under the jurisdiction of the Diocese of Parañaque. Las Piñas is home to the 2 prominent pilgrim Catholic Shrine: Diocesan Shrine of St. Joseph Parish and Diocesan Shrine of the Five Wounds of Our Lord Jesus Christ.

Other religions in Las Piñas include Members Church of God International (MCGI) various Protestant denominations, Jehovah's Witnesses, Iglesia ni Cristo, The Church of Jesus Christ of Latter-day Saints, Hinduism, Buddhism and Islam.

== Economy ==
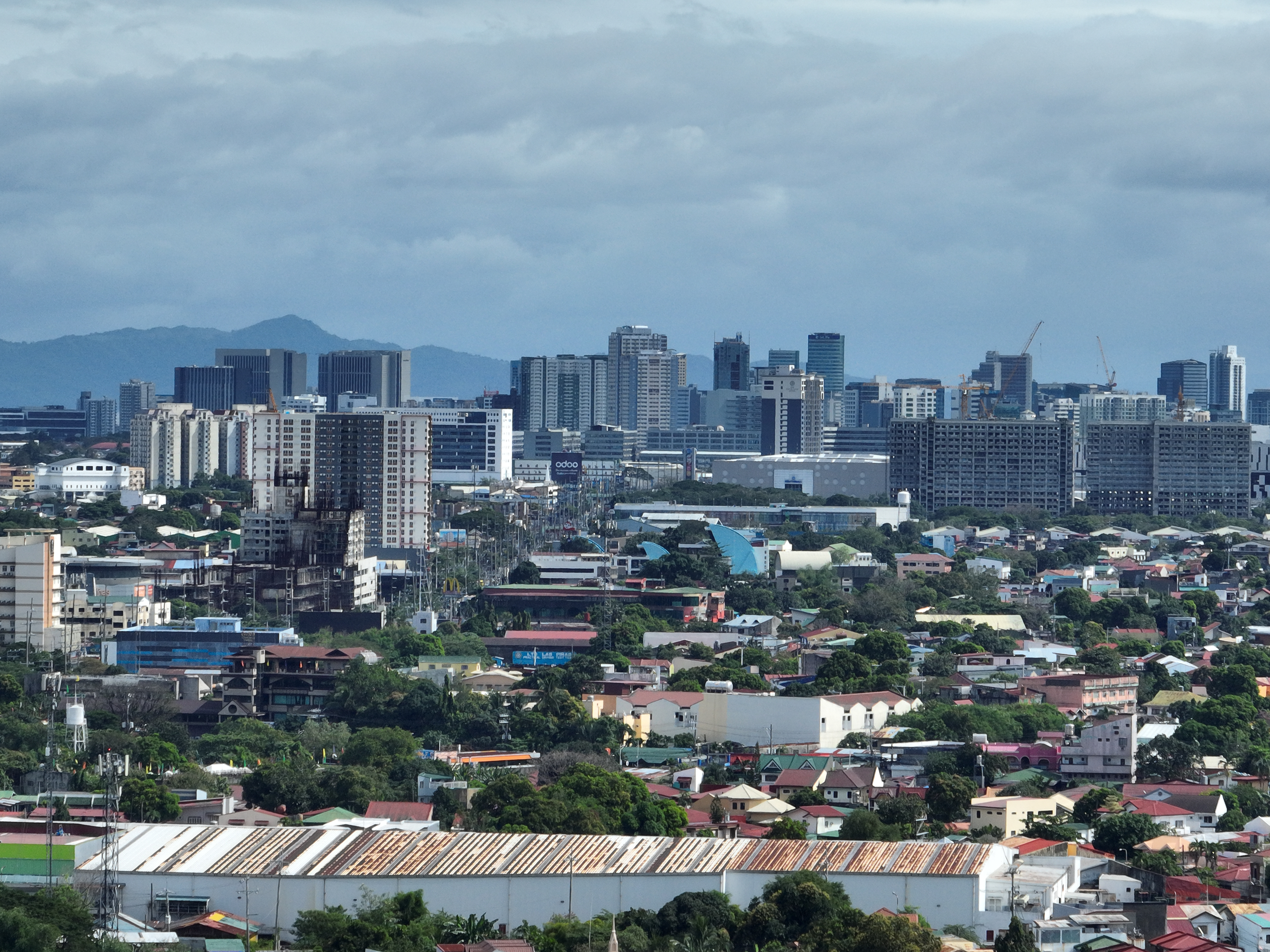
A drone shot of the Las Piñas City skuyline, with buildings in Alabang seen at the background

=== Coconuts ===
Coconut shells and husks, which were discarded by coconut vendors, previously blocked the rivers of Las Piñas and Zapote. Currently, coco coir nets are being utilized for lining the riverbanks.

This efficient natural alternative for flood prevention is 80% more cost-effective than traditional riprap techniques such as cement and stone and is also effective for stopping soil erosion.

Like a beehive comb, the net is woven to create openings for plant growth within the cells, allowing their long roots to help secure the soil. The coco coir net is more resistant to sun and water damage compared to plastic nets, making it more durable. Additionally, it is eco-friendly because the material breaks down gradually into tiny pieces that enrich the soil.

Additional applications for coir fiber involve utilizing it as a potting material for horticulture purposes, in hydroponic systems, and for managing erosion.

The different ways in which it is used have led to a higher need for the coconet, providing a means of income for several Las Piñas locals who turn coconut husks into nets through weaving.

The Las Piñas city officials have given out twining and weaving tools and offered electrical assistance to its residents who have turned coconet weaving into their personal family venture.

=== Salt-making industry ===
During the 18th century, the fishing village of Las Piñas adopted salt-making techniques with the use of solar dry beds. Over the years, numerous hectares encircling the ancient town were transformed into salt beds named "irasan".

Afterwards, clay tiles or gibak were transported from as distant as Vigan to cover the salt beds. This kept the salt from touching the ground, resulting in the salt turning as white as snow and making Las Piñas known as a hub for salt production.

At the time of harvesting, Las Piñas was adorned with small white crystal pyramids. The salt was sorted and categorized into tertia, segunda, and primera grades.

Tertia salt was the darkest in color and had the highest amount of impurities. Dry ice was combined with this salt to keep ice cream fresh.

Segunda salt was utilized for the purpose of preserving fresh fish. Navotas and Malabon were the primary purchasers of segunda salt among the wholesale seafood trading communities.

However, Las Piñas was renowned for its high-quality salt, also known as primera, rumored to be as white as snow. The initial batch of salt was delivered to every public market in Manila and utilized to enhance the taste of gourmet meals.

The bay area's restoration and the resulting Coastal Road construction caused interference with salt production. The dredging and construction activities hindered fishermen from venturing out into the ocean. Most of the salt being produced started entering the cheaper segunda and tertia categories. Salt that was brought in from countries such as China and India was available for purchase at reduced costs. The salt production industry in Las Piñas has come to an end and is now just a reminiscence of the past.

In 2005, an Irasan Center was constructed where visitors could view a salt bed demonstration in commemoration of Las Piñas’ once much celebrated industry.

=== Poverty incidence ===
Poverty incidence of Las Piñas (%)

Source: Philippine Statistics Authority

== Government ==
Las Piñas City Hall

=== Local government ===
Las Piñas, like other cities of the Philippines, is a local government unit whose powers and functions are specified by the Local Government Code of the Philippines. In general, as a city, Las Piñas is headed by a mayor who heads the city's executive function and the vice mayor who heads the city's legislative function, which is composed of twelve councilors, six each from the city's two city council districts. For representation, the city is considered as one district, and therefore one representative, in the country's House of Representatives.

Like other cities and municipalities, Las Piñas is subdivided into barangays.

As of January 5, 2025, the mayor of Las Pinas is Imelda Aguilar and the vice mayor is April Aguilar.

== Education ==
There are a total of 14 colleges, 21 private high schools, 18 public high schools, and 22 elementary schools that were built to accommodate the growing number of enrollees every year.

To date, there are 77 day care centers with feeding programs in 20 barangays within Las Piñas.

=== Colleges ===
| School |
|---|
| ABE International Business College - Las Piñas |
| Bernardo College |
| Centro Escolar Las Piñas |
| Don Carlo Cavina School |
| Dr. Filemon C. Aguilar Memorial College of Las Piñas-Talon Tres Campus: a local college that offers Bachelor's degree in Accountancy and Business Administration (with majors in Marketing Management, Financial Management, and Human Resource Development Management). |
| Dr. Filemon C. Aguilar Memorial College of Las Piñas-Pamplona Tres Campus (formerly Dr. Filemon C. Aguilar Information Technology Training Institute or DFCAITTI): a local college that offers diploma courses like Computer Programming, Visual Graphics Design, and Animations. It also offers Bachelor's degrees in Information System and Computer Engineering. |
| Philippine Merchant Marine School |
| AMA Computer College, Las Piñas |
| STI College Las Piñas |
| Saint Francis of Assisi College |
| Southville International School and Colleges |
| University of Perpetual Help System DALTA |
| International Electronics and Technical Institute - Las Piñas |
| Southville International School affiliated with Foreign Universities |
| National University |

=== Public high schools ===
- Las Piñas City National Science High School
- Las Piñas National High School - Almanza Uno
- Las Piñas East National High School - Verdant
- Equitable Village National High School (formerly Las Piñas East National High School - Equitable Village Annex II)
- Talon Village National High School (formerly Las Piñas East National High School - Talon Village Annex II)
- Las Piñas North National High School- Vergonville Subd., PulanLupa Dos
- Las Piñas National High School – Gatchalian Annex
- Las Piñas City Technical-Vocational High School (formerly Rizal Experimental Station and Pilot School of Cottage Industries – Las Piñas)
- Las Piñas City National Senior High School – Doña Josefa Campus
- Las Piñas City National Senior High School – Talon Dos Campus
- Las Piñas City National Senior High School – CAA Campus
- Las Piñas City National Senior High School – Manuyo Campus
- Las Piñas National High School – Senior High School
- CAA National High School - Main
- CAA National High School – Annex
- Golden Acres National High School
- Las Piñas North National High School
- Lydia Aguilar National High School (T.S. Cruz High School)

=== Private high schools ===
- Academy of Jesus
- Almanza Baptist Christian Academy
- Augustinian Abbey School
- Blessed Trinity School of Las Piñas
- Bloomfield Academy Center for Science and Technology
- Bethany School of Las Piñas
- Brentwood Academy of Las Piñas
- Camella Homes Montessori Child Development Center
- Camella School INC
- Centro Escolar Las Piñas
- Don Carlo Cavina School
- Divine Light Academy
- Elizabeth Seton School
- Holy Rosary Academy of Las Piñas City
- Saint Joseph's Academy
- St. Rose of Lima (Las Piñas) School Inc.
- St. Michael's School, Inc.
- St. Mark's Institute
- St. Mark's Institute(Golden Gate Campus)
- Sto. Niño De Eucharistia Academy
- St. Therese School
- Schola de Vita, Inc.
- Southville International School and Colleges
- Young Achievers International School
- Westfield Science-Oriented School and Colleges
- APEC Schools (Affordable Private Education Center)
- Father Angelico Lipani School- Annex
- Merry Treasure School
- Mary Immaculate Parish Special School
- Operation Brotherhood Montessori Center
- Our Lady of the Pilar Montessori Center
- Montessori De Manila

== Healthcare ==
=== Free hospitalisation via Green Card ===
Each legitimate inhabitant is eligible for complimentary medical care valued at PhP 30,000 supported by the municipal administration. The hospitalization plan covers small surgeries and stays approved at Las Piñas Doctors Hospital, San Juan De Dios Hospital, and Philippine General Hospital and Medical Center. This is in addition to being able to receive free medical and dental care at 30 state-of-the-art health centers in the city. The Las Piñas Maternity Clinic provides superior maternal and child health care for mothers and their children.

The Green Card Program started in 2000 and currently has over 80,000 Green Card holders. It has greatly helped in making health care more accessible to the city's residents and improving their overall quality of life.

The city government's prioritization of health care, which includes improving health facilities and implementing sustainable health programs, was acknowledged by the Department of Health (DOH) with the Sentrong Sigla Award.

== Transportation ==
=== Railway ===
Las Piñas is part of the route of the extension of the LRT Line 1, the South Extension Project. The actual construction officially started on Tuesday, May 7, 2019 because the Right-of-way is "free and clear" from obstructions. Once it is fully operational, Las Piñas will be served by the LRT Line 1 through the Las Piñas station and Zapote station.

As of January 5, 2025, phase 1 is 100% complete. The Department of Transportation Executive Assistant, Jonathan Gesmundo, announced the successful completion of Phase 1 of the LRT-1 Cavite Extension. This milestone has added eight new stations to the existing 20 stations, significantly enhancing the transportation network.

Looking ahead, the Department of Transportation has confirmed that work on Phases 2 and 3 of the LRT-1 Cavite Extension is progressing. These subsequent phases are expected to further expand the line and improve transit services in the region, with operations slated to begin by 2031.

=== Road network ===
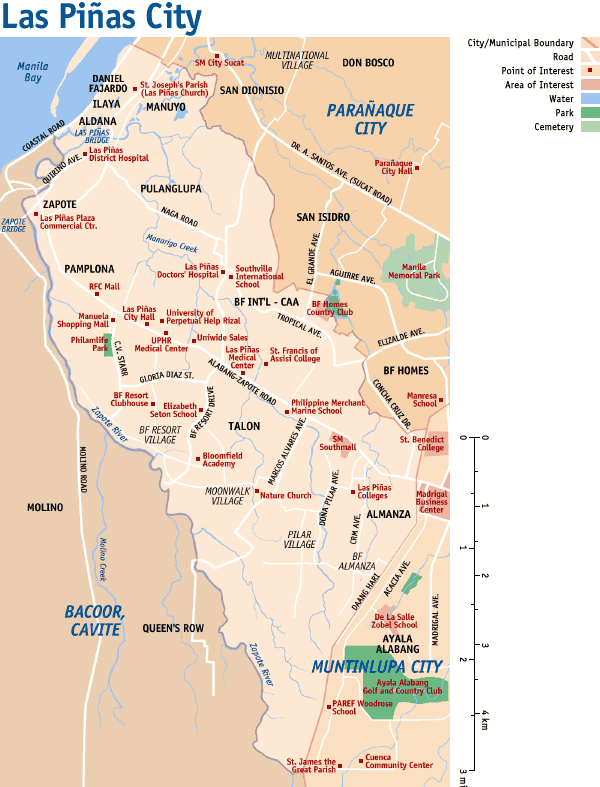
Map of Las Piñas

The road network of Las Piñas is radial in nature, and primarily relies on the Alabang–Zapote Road (N411), which serves as the city's road network backbone. The Manila-Cavite Expressway (formerly Coastal Road, and numbered E3), a toll expressway serves as the major traffic route towards Manila. Daang Hari, which hugs near the boundary with Muntinlupa, and the Aguinaldo Highway (N62) are the major traffic routes toward Cavite. The Muntinlupa-Cavite Expressway (MCX), which leads to South Luzon Expressway, supplements Daang Hari as an alternative to the congested Alabang-Zapote Road over Alabang and Ayala Alabang in Muntinlupa.

The road network in Las Piñas suffers from traffic jams, especially on the primary artery, Alabang-Zapote Road, which carried more than 70,000 vehicles daily as of 2016. Public transport, like buses and jeepneys, fill up Alabang-Zapote Road, therefore causing further congestion. The city government petitioned the Land Transportation Franchising and Regulatory Board (LTFRB) to suspend issuing of franchises on bus and jeepneys routes that uses Alabang-Zapote Road.

The Las Piñas Friendship Route network serves as the alternate routes on the congested routes, but motorists have to obtain and display a sticker on their vehicle to use these routes, as most roads of the network are located in privately owned subdivisions (gated communities), like BF Homes, Pilar Village, and BF Resort.

=== Public transport ===
Jeepneys and buses form the major public transport system, and most of their routes follow the Alabang-Zapote Road. Most jeepneys through Las Piñas travel between Alabang and Zapote, within the city, or Baclaran, in Parañaque. Buses usually form routes between Alabang or SM Southmall and destinations in Manila. Buses and jeepneys are blamed for the worsening congestion on Alabang-Zapote Road.

== Culture ==
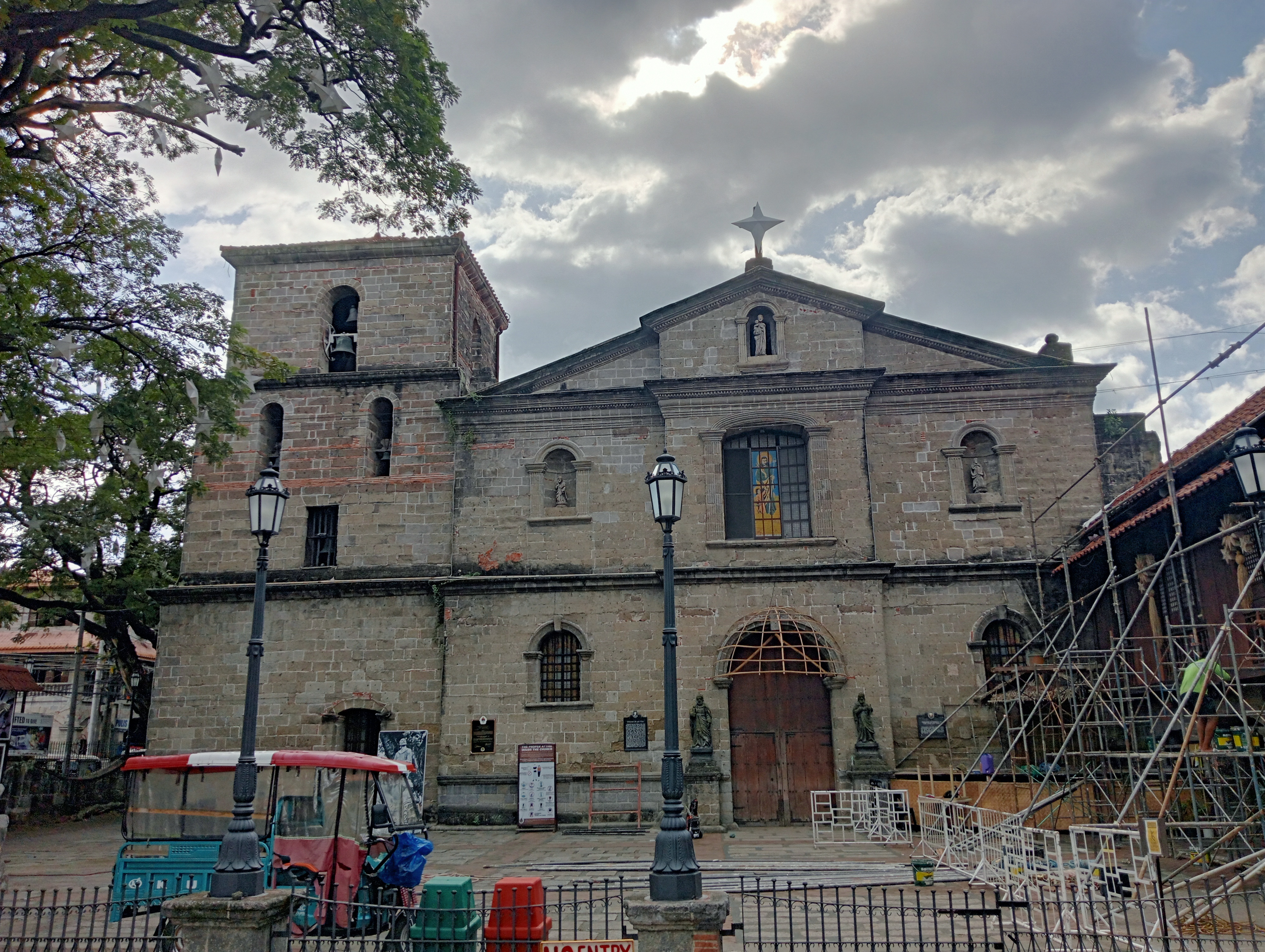
Saint Joseph Parish Church

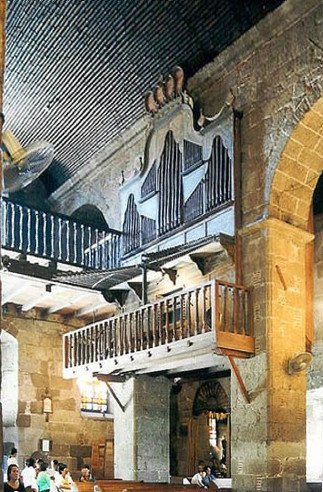
Las Piñas Bamboo Organ located inside Parish Church of St. Joseph

On February 22, 1995, then President Fidel V. Ramos signed Republic Act 8003 into a law – declaring Las Piñas Church and Bamboo Organ, Las Piñas Bridge, Asinan Area, Father Diego Cera Bridge, and Old District Hospital as tourist spots of Las Piñas.

Las Piñas is famous for its Bamboo Organ located inside the St. Joseph Parish Church in the old district of the city. Built in 1824 by a Catholic priest, Fr. Diego Cera, it is the only organ of its kind in the world with organ pipes mostly made out of bamboo.

Las Piñas is also the home of the only church dedicated to the Five Wounds of Jesus Christ in the Philippines and in Asia. The Diocesan Shrine of the Five Wounds of Our Lord Jesus Christ, the first diocesan shrine in Las Piñas, is located in District 2 of the City.

=== Las Piñas Historical Corridor ===
The Las Piñas Historical Corridor Project was a program laid to restore the Old Town of Las Piñas. It was launched at the Malacañan Heroes' Hall on November 13, 1997. The project aims to educate the people of Las Piñas along the tourist corridor.

=== Las Piñas Town Fiesta ===
The town fiesta of Las Piñas is celebrated every first Sunday of May each year to honor its patron saint, Saint Joseph. Saint Joseph's Day celebration is centered in St. Joseph Parish Church in the old poblacion of District 1, Las Piñas in Barangay Daniel Fajardo on Padre Diego Cera Ave. (Quirino Ave.). Since 1985 in District 2 Las Piñas, the people of Talon joyously celebrated every third Sunday of Easter the feast of Five Wounds of Our Lord Jesus Christ. Las Piñas was also the home of Mary Immaculate Parish Church, popularly known as the Nature Church, designed by architect Francisco "Bobby" Mañosa.

Las Piñas is also home to unique festivals such as:

- International Bamboo Organ Festival – a music festival held in February celebrating the music of the unique Bamboo Organ with performances by local and foreign classical artists
- Waterlily Festival – every July 27
- Parol or Lantern Festival – celebrated during Christmas season
- Las Piñas Historical Festival – celebrated every March to commemorate significant historical events that happened in the city

== Notable people ==
- Amani Aguinaldo, Philippines national football team
- Kevin Alas, PBA player that currently plays for the NLEX Road Warriors and former member of Gilas Pilipinas
- Zara Aldana or Zephorah Aldana Mayon, Mutya ng Pilipinas 2007 Asia Pacific International and former housemate of Pinoy Big Brother: Celebrity Edition 2
- Josh Cullen, singer
- Stell, singer
- Raymond Bagatsing, actor
- McNeal (Awra) Briguela, child actor as seen on Ang Probinsyano
- Ely Buendia, songwriter, vocalist and guitarist of Eraserheads, Pupil, Oktaves and Apartel
- Sef Cadayona, actor and dancer
- Rayver Cruz, actor and host
- Rodjun Cruz, actor and dancer
- Tirso Cruz III, actor
- Jen Da Silva, model, dancer as part of the 26K girls of Kapamilya, Deal or No Deal and former housemate of Pinoy Big Brother: Celebrity Edition 2
- Anjo Damiles, actor
- Ranidel de Ocampo, former PBA player, former member of Gilas Pilipinas, and current assistant coach of TNT Tropang 5G
- Mr. Fu, radio jock, comedian and host
- Michelle Gavagan, Miss Philippines Fire 2011
- Enrique Gil, artist of ABS-CBN
- Nikki Gil, singer, actress, TV host and former MYX VJ
- Allan K., co-host of Eat Bulaga
- Pauleen Luna, actress
- Yasser Marta, actor and TV host
- Pol Medina Jr., author of Pugad Baboy
- Jennylyn Mercado, actress and singer
- Iwa Moto, actress
- Sitti Navarro, bossa nova singer
- Amy Perez, actress, host and radio anchor
- Quest, R&B singer
- Rox Santos, songwriter
- Ashley Sarmiento, actress, model and social media influencer
- Kai Sotto, member of Philippine men's basketball team Gilas Pilipinas
- Zack Tabudlo, singer-songwriter
- Keb Cuevas, environmentalist and former Rappler journalist

== Sister cities ==
=== Local ===
- Parañaque, Metro Manila
- Muntinlupa, Metro Manila
- Pasay, Metro Manila
- Bacoor, Cavite
- Samal, Davao del Norte

=== International ===
- Sochi, Russia
- Ufa, Russia

== See also ==
- Battle of Zapote Bridge
- Las Piñas Boys Choir
- Las Piñas Chamber
