= Las Piñas Chamber =

Trade Association in the Philippines

The Las Piñas Chamber of Commerce & Industry (LPCCI), is a non-stock, non-profit organization, chartered on October 29, 1993. It was one of the two local chambers (the other was the Parañaque Chamber), that was organized by its mother chamber, the South Metro Manila Chamber of Commerce and Industry (SMMCCI).

Among the proponents were Enrique C. Lim, Antonio L. Tamayo, who later became the Charter President, Peter Sy Gaisano and Fernando Francisco. The Chamber is composed of firms from manufacturing and commercial operations related to food, garments, pharmaceutical, plastics, office supplies and equipment, motor vehicles, trucks and jeepney assembly, steel and fabrication, tire and rubber products, home and office furnishings/appliances, real estate development and housing in the municipality of Las Piñas. Companies involved in services such as accounting, management consulting, brokerage, building construction, security, hospital, education and cargo forwarding are also among the member-firms.

The main purpose of the LPCCI is “to foster closer relations, understanding and cooperation among industrial, manufacturing and commercial establishments in the City of Las Piñas to the end that their full economic, commercial and industrial development and progress may be realized at a faster pace.”

On its first year, various notable projects were undertaken such as scholarship programs for handicapped students in secondary and tertiary levels; participation in seminars on national issues such as Expanded VAT and GATT; dialogue-symposium with the Las Piñas municipal government officials headed by then Mayor Ben Casimiro, the passage of six (6) resolutions covering waste disposals, mass hygiene and water cycling; liquor ban within 200-meter radius from an educational establishment; and creation of multi-sectoral group to address the problem of drug addiction and street children in coordination with the Las Piñas municipal government.

Likewise, the Chamber has established ties with APALPS (Association of Personnel Administrators of Las Piñas and Suburbs) to assist in the manpower requirements of member companies who were confronted with labor problems.

In 2000, Enrique Lim, the Millennium President, steered the Chamber under its theme, “Industrial Peace: A Milestone in the new Millennium.” Among its members who were in the government were House Speaker Manuel Villar, Mayor Vergel Aguilar, former Mayor Rosalino Riguera and Overseas Workers Welfare Administration Administrator Eli Gardiner.

Its principal address was first located at the Republic Steel Tube, Inc. Compound, Pamplona, Las Piñas. Later on, it moved to Blk. 17 Lot 24 M. Consing St., BF Homes Resort Village, Las Piñas. Now its present address is 615 Alabang-Zapote Road, Almanza, Las Piñas.
