= Las Piñas City National Science High School =

Public science high school in Las Piñas, Philippines

Las Piñas City National Science High School (Filipino: Mataas na Paaralang Pang-Agham ng Lungsod ng Las Piñas) is a specialized public science high school in BF Resort Village, Las Piñas, Philippines. Established in 2007, it offers a curriculum focused on English, Mathematics, and Science for approximately 800 students in Grades 7 through 12. The institution is recognized by the Department of Education and administered by the local government of Las Piñas.
