= Jen Da Silva =

Filipino model and dancer

Jen Da Silva–Geisler (born December 4, 1989) is model, dancer as part of the 26K girls of Kapamilya, Deal or No Deal and former housemate of Pinoy Big Brother: Celebrity Edition 2.

== Personal life ==
She married taekwondo master and fellow housemate Donald Geisler in a simple ceremony in Las Piñas in December 2008. She is a half sister of a former actor Dennis Da Silva. The couple had a daughter.

She went to St. Therese School from 2004 to 2005 and from 2006 to 2007.

== Filmography ==
=== Television ===
Year	Title	Role	Notes	Source
2006	Kapamilya, Deal or No Deal	Herself – 26K girl		
2007	Pinoy Big Brother: Celebrity Edition 2	Herself – housemate		
2008	ASAP	Herself – performer		
