= Will Devaughn =

Filipino actor and model

- Born: William Devaughn Stumpf; February 27, 1982 (age 44); Büdingen, Germany
- Occupations: Actor; Producer; Host; Commercial Model
- Years active: 2006–present
- Agents: Star Magic (2008–2010); GMA Artist Center (2010-2014; 2017-present)
- Children: 1
- Website: Will Devaughn on Instagram

William Devaughn Stumpf (born February 27, 1982) is a Filipino-German-American commercial model and actor.

== Early life ==
Devaughn was born in Germany. His biological father is of mixed Filipino and African American lineage while his mother is of German descent. His stepfather then relocated the family to the US.

== Career ==
Devaughn worked as a waiter at a coffee shop in Disneyland, supporting himself through school (taking up a course on medical assistance). His girlfriend at the time (the cousin of Aubrey Miles) encouraged him to follow her as she wanted to enter the showbiz industry.

Devaughn arrived in the Philippines in 2004 without knowing a single word of Tagalog. He then entered the Pinoy Big Brother house during its Celebrity Edition 2, and became the fourth big placer of that season.

He was a former talent of ABS-CBN and in 2010. He moved to GMA Network until 2013 but he decided to quit from show business as a contract of Sparkle (formerly GMA Artist Center) then returned in 2017 via Trops and My Love from the Star.

== Personal life ==
Devaughn is now a father to a baby boy named Magnus Orion. His first child with Filipina-Dutch girlfriend international emcee Cay Kuijpers was born on November 9, 2019. He was previously in a relationship with Roxanne Barcelo.

== Filmography ==
=== Films ===
Year	Title	Role	Notes	Ref.
2007	Desperadas	Patrick		
2008	Desperadas 2	Patrick		
2010	Layang Bilanggo	Frank		
2012	El Presidente	Agapito Bonzon		
2014	Water Wars	Jared		
2017	I Found my Heart in Santa Fe	Viktor	Indie film	
2017	Siargao	Tommy		
2018	First Love	Kevin		

=== Drama series ===
Year	Title	Role	Notes	Ref.
2006	Da Adventures of Pedro Penduko	Kapre	Episode 24: Minokawa, guest cast	
2008	Love Spell: The Bet	Steve	Season 6, supporting role	
2009	Bud Brothers: Once in a Lifetime Love	Felimon "Monty" Geronimo	1st installment of PHR Presents, Book 7, first lead role	
2010	Habang May Buhay	Patrick “Nonoy” Esteban	main role	
2010	You're Mine, Only Mine	Alejandro "Alex" Moravilla Jr.	7th installment of PHR Presents, main role	
2010	Gimik 2010: New Beginnings	Raymond Salvador	Season 2, supporting role	
2010	Magkaribal	Nick	guest cast	
2011	Dwarfina	Elvin	main cast	
2011	Kung Aagawin Mo Ang Langit	Waldy Buenafe	supporting role	
2012	Faithfully	Luke Gallanosa	supporting role	
2013	Indio	Barangaw	recurring role	
2013	Tsuperhero	Enchanted Tom	Episode 19: Diwata, guest cast	
2014	The Boston Show	Devin Conroy	Episode 8: No More Mr. Knife Guy, guest cast	
2014	Wagas	Wade Bodlovic	Season 2, Episode 31: January & Wade Love Story	
2015	Wagas	Troy Montero	Season 2, Episode 84: Aubrey & Troy Love Story	
2015	Dangwa	Aries	Episode 21-25, guest cast	
2017	My Love from the Star	Yugo Meneses	Episode 10, guest cast	
2017	Trops	Bruno	supporting role	
2019	Beautiful Justice	Smokey	guest cast	
2024	FPJ's Batang Quiapo	Gold Buyer	guest cast	

=== TV series ===
Year	Title	Notes	Ref.
2007	Pinoy Big Brother: Celebrity Edition 2	as a housemate, crowned as 4th Big Placer	
2008	All-Star Sunday Afternoon Party	PBB Victory Party with fellow PBB: Celebrity Edition 2 housemates	
2009	Shall We Dance?	guest appearance	
2010	Party Pilipinas	2010-2013, co-host, performer, formally introduced as Kapuso	

=== MV appearance ===
- MasaRap! (Schizophrenia, 2013)
