= Pinoy Big Brother: Celebrity Edition 2 =

Pinoy Big Brother: Celebrity Edition
- Season 2
- Presented by: Toni Gonzaga; Bianca Gonzalez; Mariel Rodriguez; Beatriz Saw
- No. of days: 84
- No. of housemates: 16
- Winner: Ruben Gonzaga
- Runner-up: (Canada) Riza Santos

Release
- Original network: ABS-CBN
- Original release: October 14, 2007 – January 5, 2008

Season chronology
- ← Previous; Celebrity Edition Next → Celebrity Collab Edition

The second season of the reality game show Pinoy Big Brother: Celebrity Edition aired on ABS-CBN ran for 84 days from October 14, 2007 to January 5, 2008. (Note: It was announced on November 19, 2007 that the season was supposed to run until December 22, 2007 for 70 days, however it was extended for two more weeks and instead ended on January 5, 2008.)

This was the last, separate celebrity edition to air after all three editions of the show were combined into one season starting on All In.

After 84 days, Ruben Gonzaga was named the winner. Riza Santos was the runner-up, while Gaby Dela Merced and Will Devaughn were the finalists.

== Overview ==
=== House theme ===
For this Celebrity Edition, the House is the refurbished one used in the second regular season. But unlike the previous Celebrity Edition wherein the housemates entered into an almost empty House, this edition's housemates entered into a royalty-themed house, now containing murals, chandeliers, posh furniture, and lighting fixtures. The gym equipment is now found in the garden. The room previously used by the men in the second regular season is now used by the women, and vice versa. The original bathroom is now the special shower room to be used exclusively by the Head of Household and his/her chosen companion. One of the two original "his-her" restrooms is now the general shower/bath room while the other has become the general restroom.

Also added is a jail cell-like Punishment Room found along the way towards the confession and storage rooms. This is where the housemates who committed violations would stay and perform an assigned punishment until Big Brother's further instructions.

Later, to accommodate Baron and Donald while making their decision on which brother should return to the House area after the fake eviction, the secret room used in the second regular season was again used. It now appears larger and has been repainted white with pink streaks.

=== Hosts ===
Toni Gonzaga reprised her role as the primetime host, while ex-Update host Bianca Gonzalez helmed a brand new show, Pinoy Big Brother Über. UpLate host Mariel Rodriguez also hosted Über for seven days with Bianca; but for rest of the program's duration, she was also the House's first and longest-staying houseguest. This new season also marked the hosting debut of second season winner, Beatriz Saw as she hosted the Updates.

Companion shows

Unlike past editions, Studio 23 did not air a companion program for the show. But it still continued to present delayed feed from inside the House during noontime.

=== Theme song changes ===
The theme song for the Celebrity Edition, Sikat ang Pinoy, originally sung by host Toni Gonzaga and season 1 alum Sam Milby, was rehashed and was performed by Pinoy Dream Academy winner Yeng Constantino and finalist Eman Abatayo.

=== Twists ===
- Two-in-One Housemates: Two celebrity housemates who were related in some way were treated as one. Nominations, text votes, and eviction of one housemate affected the other as well. However, Big Brother has the final decision on splitting the group, and if that happens, the two will have to play separately.
- Houseguests: Like the previous season, there are also houseguests who stayed in the House for no more than a specific amount of time without undergoing the nomination and eviction process.
- Head of Household: The Head of Household was formally introduced this season, and the housemate who wins that week's Head of Household challenge receives immunity from eviction, among other benefits. However, the next seasons only gave immunity to the winner.
- Season-Long Task: Big Brother assigned a task that lasted the entire season; see Weekly Tasks below.
- Number Assignment: Each celebrity housemate was assigned a number based on when they entered the season. This was used for voting via SMS. After Donald's eviction, this system was abandoned and it returned to the by-name system used in previous and subsequent seasons. See the Housemates section for more information.

== Housemates ==
A billboard advertisement of the second Celebrity Edition.

Thirteen (including the two-in-one housemate) is the official count of housemates who entered the House. The first eight housemates (including the 2-in-1 housemates of both genders) entered the House on Day 1, October 14. The first seven were introduced each, in silhouette before revelation. The eighth housemate was introduced through in a Deal or No Deal-esque style, since one of the 26K ladies was about to enter. The surprise housemates were also introduced with one hiding inside a giant travel bag while the other being acknowledged to the live audience before proceeding into the House's activity area. The last five housemates entered on Days 2 to 4. They are listed here in order of entrance.

Each housemate is assigned a housemate number depending on their entry to the House; the Geisler brothers and the 26K models are assigned the numbers 7 and 8 respectively. These numbers are used in voting for a particular housemate by SMS. This is a deviation from past editions wherein voting is done by name. After the Geisler brothers' split as a 2-in-1 housemate on Day 39, Baron retained the old number 7 while Donald was given the number 14. But after Donald's exit, the voting was reverted to the by-name format.

Name	Age on entry	Notability	Entered	Exited	Result
Ruben Gonzaga	25	Comedian	Day 1	Day 84	Winner
Riza Santos	21	Beauty queen	Day 1	Day 84	Runner-up
Gaby Dela Merced	25	F3 driver	Day 44	Day 84	3rd Place
Gaby Dela Merced	25	F3 driver	Day 2	Day 28	Voluntary exit
Will Devaughn	25	Commercial model	Day 1	Day 84	4th Place
Jon Avila	22	Commercial model	Day 1	Day 81	Forced eviction
Baron Geisler	25	Actor	Day 1	Day 75	Forced eviction
Yayo Aguila	40	Actress	Day 70	Day 71	Evicted
Yayo Aguila	40	Actress	Day 1	Day 66	Voluntary exit
Gladys Guevarra	30	Comedian and impersonator	Day 46	Day 58	Voluntary exit
Donald Geisler	28	Former Olympic taekwondo-jin	Day 1	Day 56	Evicted
Victor Basa	22	Actor and model	Day 1	Day 49	Evicted
Mariel Rodriguez	23	Celebrity Houseguest	Day 4	Day 49	Exited
Ethel Booba	30	Comedian	Day 4	Day 40	Voluntary exit
Mcoy Fundales	30	Orange and Lemons former frontman	Day 3	Day 40	Voluntary exit
Megan Young	17	Actress	Day 1	Day 35	Evicted
Zara Aldana	18	Beauty queen	Day 3	Day 21	Evicted
Marylaine Viernes	21	26K model	Day 1	Day 14	Evicted
Jen da Silva	17	26K model	Day 1	Day 14	Evicted

== Houseguests ==
Like the second regular season, there are also houseguests who stayed in the House for no more than a specific amount of time without undergoing the nomination and eviction process.

Host Mariel Rodriguez is the first houseguest. She was "trapped" in the House by Big Brother on Day 4 after she brought Jon into the confession room and then the main House area. Contrary to what was presented when she came in, Mariel was in the House with a special mission and she did so with the consents of herself and her manager Boy Abunda. That mission was to be Big Brother's extra eyes and ears and to report which of the celebrity housemates were being true to themselves, as well as learning things about them. She was supposed to leave on Day 42, but because of recent events, Big Brother decided to further extend her stay until "the appointed time." That appointed time was Day 49. A week later, having missed the housemates, she accepted Big Brother's invitation to stay until the finale. Of course, she would have a series of tasks upon her return, her first one happened to be taking over Big Brother's place on Day 57 as the latter would be gone on an "official business." She left the House for the second time on the Day 77.

Host Toni Gonzaga was the second houseguest, after Mariel. She was called by Big Brother on Day 15 to go to the confession room and later he said that she was the newest houseguest because she was the only host of Pinoy Big Brother that he hadn't bond with, unlike Bianca Gonzalez, a housemate during the first Celebrity Edition, and Mariel, who was currently playing out her houseguest role. She was also told to perform certain tasks in order for her to leave, among them hosting a slumber party for the housemates and accompanying Riza to her rite of closure on the murder of Riza's nephew. She left the House on Day 19, having performed the said tasks. During Toni's time in the House, Bianca took over hosting duties for the primetime edition of the show.

TV show host Kris Aquino was the third houseguest. She entered the House on Day 23 to help the housemates cook spaghetti carbonara and brought them gifts and letters from their loved ones. Her stay lasted until the afternoon, after saying "No Deal" to Big Brother. The meaning of that response as well as those of Big Brother's prior question "Deal or No Deal" and an already-prepared luggage bag in the confession room is open to interpretation.

Actress Angel Locsin was the fourth houseguest. She entered the House on Day 43 disguised as a sniper. She also had a task of becoming an "Angel of Love" to Ruben and help him on his marriage proposal to his wife to be aired on national television. She left the next night.

Ethel returned to House on Day 59 as a houseguest (see above). Like all houseguests, she was given tasks that, when accomplished, would benefit three children from the Payatas Dump Site in Quezon City and their families. One of her first tasks as houseguest was to become the House's chambermaid, with two assistants Jan and Vier (named after her ex-boyfriend Janvier Daily), in tow. The two aides would come to her aid when needed. Like Mariel, Ethel stayed until Day 77.

On Day 82, Big Brother turned host Bianca Gonzalez into the House's last houseguest for the second Celebrity Edition. He wanted her to accompany the "Big Four" on the final nights in the House. Bianca was also one of the previous Celebrity Edition's "Big Four." She left the next day.

== Chronology of notable events ==
Below is a chronology of events, not including nomination and eviction nights. This section also lists voluntary and temporary exits, entrances of houseguests, visitors, new housemates, HOH competitions, and other events that affected the housemates' lives inside the House. This case, October 14, 2007, is considered Day 1.

=== Week 1 ===
- Day 1: The first eight housemates entered the House. Jen was revealed hidden in a giant travel bag, while the men discovered Donnie hidden in a large barrel.
- Day 2: Gaby entered the house riding a "twister bike" (basically a child's trike) along a ramp that led to the pool.
- Day 3: Mcoy and Zara entered the House in two different instances. Mcoy sang Pinoy Ako directly inside the confession room and later entered the House. Later, Zara was escorted into the House by Baron. Will accidentally fell into the pool while still wearing his lapel microphone. As a result, Big Brother gave Will a handheld microphone in place of his then-wet lapel microphone.
- Day 4: Mariel brought Jon into the House, but Big Brother trapped her inside the House. She was later made into a "celebrity houseguest." Ethel was welcomed with a small party organized by Big Brother. Ruben, being in the same profession as Ethel, was tasked to host the party.
- Day 6: Marylaine, Will, and Mariel became the first three housemates to use the punishment room for various offenses. Will and Mariel peeled a bowl of lanzones using their mouths, and Marylaine shedded coats of squash seeds.
- Day 7: Will finally had his lapel microphone returned to him, but he had to get past cockroaches and other insects to get it. Marylaine and Jen were put in the punishment room for a violation Jen committed. Their bickering continued while installing train tracks used in the weekly task. The entire task took overnight, but the two eventually reconciled.

=== Week 2 ===
- Day 8: The first HOH competition was held wherein the housemates wore giant "hands" and played a game similar the Japanese game of karuta using colors. Ethel won the game.
- Day 10: Donnie and Marylaine finally had several of their clothes after Gaby and Victor packed some of their things just to make it happen.

=== Week 3 ===
- Day 15: Gaby momentarily left the House to compete in a Formula Three race in the Subic International Speedway. She finished first in the second heat of the competition. Main primetime host Toni became the new houseguest.
- Day 16: The second HOH competition was held, involving children's trikes. Riza, Ruben, and Will won in each of the three preliminary heats, with Riza winning the final round and the title of Head of Household.
- Day 17: Mcoy, Victor, and Riza temporarily left the House to help embalm the body of a man who had been dead for a month due to a heart attack and whose family had no money for a proper embalming, let alone a decent funeral. Inside of the House during the absence of the trio, the other housemates also did Halloween-related tasks also to help the said man's family.
- Day 18: Baron smashed a pane of the living room table with his foot. The table was taken out to be repaired. Later, after the housemates partied with Bea Alonzo and John Lloyd Cruz in a black-attire party, they saw that every other table in the House was gone. In particular, the long dining table was replaced with two panes of glass on which they would eat, with some housemates acting as one pane's "table legs."
- Day 19: Toni was told that she could leave the House. But before she left, she wrote and recited a poem to the housemates, saying thank you to them.
- Day 20: Yayo was taken to the hospital due to high blood pressure as recommended by the doctor. She returned to the house the next day. Ethel accidentally broke a very small part of the chandelier in the men's bedroom while tossing throw pillows with several of the housemates. As a result, all seven male housemates were incarcerated in the punishment room while Big Brother decided on the punishment to be given to them.
- Day 21: Baron, Donald, Will, and Ruben participated in a task of balancing a number of plastic goblets in a failed attempt to salvage their weekly budget. Later, the housemates came to the aid of Peggy, the pig they were nursing as part of their Season-Long Task, as the sow had given birth to a total of ten piglets, nine alive and one stillborn.

=== Week 4 ===
- Day 22: The housemates christened Peggy's nine live piglets, even giving them names such as "Posh," "Sweet," and "B-Boy" to mention a few. Later, Gaby was given time to decide whether or not she would make an exit to attend a seminar in the United States.
- Day 23: The third HOH competition was held involving human bowling pins and a swinging bowling ball. The Geisler brothers, represented by Donald, won the title of HOH. Later, Gaby ultimately decided to make the exit and attend the said seminar. Furthermore, Ethel, with the help of Ruben, finished a new table using giant pick up sticks from an earlier game. Big Brother not only lauded the new table; he also made it the new living room center table to replace the glass one smashed by Baron. Along with the new table was the return of the remaining good tables in the House.
- Day 25: Ethel requested a home pregnancy test from Big Brother to confirm this possibility. The next day, when she had her test, it came out negative.
- Day 26: Jon, who was deeply distraught over the news of his aunt's death, temporarily left the House in the wee hours of the day to visit his aunt's funeral, personally offer the flower arrangement he helped Ethel make, and pay his last respects to her. It was already morning when he returned to the House.
- Day 27: Victor, Mcoy, Riza, Gaby, and Megan picked the short straws and were sent by Big Brother to the Cebu Provincial Detention and Rehabilitation Center to dance The Breakfast Club's Rico Mambo with its inmates. The five returned to the House in the afternoon. Later, Jon, while blindfolded, had a 100-second encounter with his mother.
- Day 28: Ethel threatened to leave the House without Big Brother's consent, even toying with a small straight razor. Fearing for her life, the other housemates stopped her and urged her to speak with Big Brother.

=== Week 5 ===
- Day 29: The fourth HOH competition was held, involving the housemates hanging onto punching bags for as long as they could without touching the ground. Victor, Jon, and Will were the only ones left hanging after fifteen minutes. Will would eventually become the winner of title.
- Day 30: Big Brother started to mete out punishments on housemates who committed violations:
  - For sleeping at inappropriate places at the wrong times, Baron was made to sleep on the long bench and he had to be carried around by his brother. When he was caught sleeping on a chair, he was then made to sleep on a bamboo bed, but he had to carry it wherever he goes.
  - For telling Gaby that she nominated her for eviction, Riza was told to dress up as a soldier. First, she watched Baron to make sure he strictly followed his punishment. Later, after she became lax, she was told to act and talk like a soldier.
  - For using spoons instead of plastic stirrers, Mcoy and Victor became "human plastic stirrers" by wearing red-and-white-striped coveralls and were told to gyrate when the Wowowee tune Iyugyog Mo was played.
  - For whispering, misusing and deliberately removing her lapel microphone and toying with the razor, which Big Brother deemed as an act of violence, Ethel was told to dress up and act like an infant. She thus became "Baby Poshy" to "daddy" Will and "mommy" Riza.
  - For stashing potato chips past the appointed time of gathering supplies, Victor was told to peel potatoes inside the punishment room.
  - For a violation known only to Big Brother, Megan, Riza, Victor, and Will had to fit inside a giant pair of pajama trousers. Later, Megan was told that her companions had been relieved of their punishment and she had to do the rest of her punishment with a giant teddy bear.
  - All housemates were also reprimanded by Big Brother for not using their lapel microphones properly. So they were told to wear chains and padlocks around their waists.

=== Week 6 ===
- Day 36: The Geislers, Jon, and Riza were "nominated for eviction." Unbeknownst to the housemates, the nomination round was really just a mock one.
- Day 38: A mock eviction night was held wherein the Geisler brothers were "evicted" from the House. Upon exit, they were led by Toni to an empty Eviction Hall and from there they were brought back to the confession room. At the confession room, the brothers found out that the whole process was a hoax because Big Brother wanted to tell them that he had decided to abolish their 2-in-1 connection (which was already planned by Big Brother). Knowing how Donald did his best to watch over Baron at the same time thinking of his son while Baron had become less reliant of his older brother, Big Brother told the two that only one Geisler would continue his stay in the House on behalf of the other. That common decision of which Geisler would stay should be reached in 24 hours and should not be discussed with each other.
- Day 39: After having a 100-second encounter with their mother, Baron decided that Donald would be the one who should continue his stay in the House. Baron did not leave completely as viewers were made to decide through a 24-hour viewer poll on whether Baron's stay should be extended.
- Day 40: In the wee hours, Mcoy and Ethel both decided to make voluntary exits and soon after left the House after conflicts involving the weekly task fumed the two. Accusations of plagiarism caused conflicts between Mcoy and Big Brother while Ethel went with Mcoy because of her already existent plans to leave. Later Baron found out that he could return to the House, as 91.69% of those who voted in the viewer poll agreed to have him back inside.
- Day 41: In an episode of Über wherein Mcoy and Ethel were guests, Big Brother subsequently apologized to Mcoy about any misunderstanding they had during that time, to which Mcoy accepted.
- Day 42: Big Brother announced that the "Big 4" housemates would receive twice the cash amounts originally promised, even showing boxes labelled "2M," "1M," "600K," and "400K" as visual aids. He also announced that the Big Night (the finale) would be held on January 5, therefore extending the run of the show for two more weeks. Big Brother even opened the front doors in case anyone wanted to back out immediately. Despite the possibility of spending Christmas and New Year's Day inside the House, all housemates decided to stay on.

=== Week 7 ===
- Day 43: After nominations were announced, Angel Locsin entered the House dressed as a sniper, shooting orange paintball pellets at the unarmed male housemates.
- Day 44: Angel, Mariel and six of the housemates went out of the House to a firing range to learn and test their use of a .45 caliber pistol. Baron and Yayo were left behind in the House as part of their punishment; Baron broke another glass goblet days before while Yayo accidentally chipped a drinking glass. The two spent the time cleaning the House and making food for the housemates. It was during their final chore—washing Big Brother's car—that they found out that Gaby had returned. The other housemates also greeted Gaby upon their return.
- Day 45: The fifth HOH competition was held. It involved the housemates crossing a beam over the swimming pool in the shortest time after being spun ten times over a rotating platform. Will was declared the winner. But the next day, citing Mariel's observation and a review of the game, Big Brother decided to transfer the title to Baron.
- Day 46: Gladys entered the House and after some introductions and greetings, she sang karaoke with them.
- Day 47: Victor and Riza temporarily left the House to engage in a wakeboarding task in Batangas in which Victor won. The two returned to the house later in the afternoon. Later, Big Brother relayed to the housemates some brief reports (with some fabrications inserted) relating to the stand-off at the Manila Peninsula Hotel.
- Day 48: International R&B artist Akon visited the House after having a concert the previous night despite the curfew after the Manila Peninsula siege. Mariel, Gladys, Donnie, Jon, and Victor, who were winners in an earlier charades game, personally greeted the artist inside the confession room for 100 seconds. To be fair, Big Brother let the rest of the Housemates meet Akon, but only for ten seconds. Akon spent a short time inside the House because of his tight schedule.
- Day 49: Mariel was finally told by Big Brother that she could make her postponed exit. She let her say her goodbyes to the housemates and left the House area's front doors before her 100-second period expired. After a few minutes and a quick change of wardrobe, Mariel returned to her hosting duties.

=== Week 8 ===
- Day 51: The sixth HOH competition was held wherein winners of seven mini-games must select a fellow housemate to leave a boat floating on the swimming pool. Mini-games played include picking cards, flying paper airplanes, drinking distasteful food, and blowing whistles among others. After the mini-games, Jon and Donald were the ones left on the boat, but the decision who would be the HOH rested on the other housemates. Jon got the nod of four out of the seven housemates, earning him the title.
- Day 52: Peggy, the pig the housemates were tending to as part of their Season-Long Task, was given away to her new owners. The housemates who were saddened by the pig's departure, would still continue to take care of Peggy's piglets.
- Day 53: While chasing her piglet Porkchop, Gaby accidentally jumped into the swimming pool not realizing she was still wearing her lapel microphone. As the lapel mic was broken beyond repair, she had to share with Donald's own microphone.
- Day 54: Big Brother furthered Gaby's punishment by spending the night the piglet pen and communicate with the housemates using semaphore flags, as suggested by Jon. Donald, being the cause of her further violations, later decided to join her so her punishment would be less harsh for her. Her punishment ended the next day.
- Day 56: Ethel visited the House in the wee hours of the morning and talked with Big Brother. Citing the changes among the people she knew and having missed the housemates, she expressed her willingness to return. Big Brother told her that he would think it over, especially her time spent in the House the first time. His decision, he told her, would be known in the "appointed time." Later in the evening, Ruben finally made his long delayed marriage proposal to his partner, the mother of his three children, who responded by telling him that she would think it over. Much later, Mariel, having missed the housemates, accepted Big Brother's invitation to be in the House once again.

=== Week 9 ===
- Day 57: Gladys told Big Sister (Mariel) her intention to leave, even deciding not to participate in "Olym-pigs." Big Sister, on a loss of what to do, told Gladys to hold on until Big Brother's return. But the advice only made Gladys's plea to let her make her exit stronger. Meanwhile, Ruben personally reiterated his proposal to his partner; this time it was accepted. The acceptance was shown to the others two weeks later.
- Day 58: Gladys left the house after slipping into depression for the last two days. In contrast, Big Sister convinced Gaby to stay. The latter already mentioned plans for a second voluntary exit to Big Brother days before.
- Day 59: Ethel emerged from the confession room together with Jan and Vier. Mariel and the housemates gathered around to welcome her back.
- Day 60: During a cocktail "beach party", Baron became intoxicated, flirting with several female housemates and unintentionally insulting Big Brother. He was accompanied by the other male housemates in the secret room to help him sober up.
- Day 62: Popular character Barney T. Dinosaur visited the housemates and danced with them for a short time.

=== Week 10 ===
- Day 66: Yayo and Mariel left the House upon news that Yayo's mother was sent to the hospital because of a heart ailment. But the two arrived in the hospital too late when they found out Yayo's mother had died. Mariel returned to the House alone to relay the news to the others and to give Yayo time to grieve. Eventually, Yayo did return to the House, but upon Big Brother's advice to "honor your mother," she ultimately decided not to continue her stint in the show.
- Day 69: The housemates sold their paintings of their piglets to raise P20,000 for charity. This was made as an alternative to selling their piglets to siblings "Lydia," "Tomas," and "Mila" (names associated with the lechon business) in exchange for the same amount. Later, noted plastic surgeon and beauty specialist Vicki Belo visited the housemates. She gave them advice on skin care. The housemates were also treated to a full body treatment by workers of her clinic.
- Day 70: After burying her mother, Yayo expressed her decision to return to the House, creating a complicated situation with only two weeks left in the show's extended run. Endemol created four conditions for Yayo's return, one of the first three being that one of the six Housemates still in the House should voluntarily surrender his/her stint. Gaby readily stated her intention to end her second stint. But the fourth condition revealed that it was up to viewers to decide whether Gaby should stay or let her trade places with Yayo. But whoever leaves would also receive P400,000, which the housemates extracted from the combined cash prizes of the "Big Four" supposedly as donation to Yayo's family. The public's decision would be known in 24 hours. Yayo resided in the secret room for most of the 24-hour wait.

=== Week 11 ===
- Day 71: Big Brother signalled the end of the Season-Long Task and instructed the housemates to say goodbye to their piglets, who would rejoin their mother at a zoo/animal farm in Tagaytay. Later, Yayo was allowed to leave the secret room and be with the housemates once again. But the reunion turned out to be short-lived as Gaby was announced as the winner of the 24-hour public poll. Gaby got 74.30% of votes and Yayo got 25.70%
- Day 72: The housemate had their Christmas Eve dinner. They agreed to exchange their menu for their dinner with food prepared by a poor community for their dinner. The housemates, except Ruben and Ethel, also received their gifts from Big Brother, both fake and real.
- Day 73: In the wee hours, Baron broke a promise he made to Big Brother when he once again became drunk and made offensive gestures in the process. In the morning, Zara, Megan, Victor, Jen, Marylaine, Donald, and Mcoy each visited the remaining housemates for a hundred seconds to personally greet them Merry Christmas. Later, Ruben had his Christmas gift: witnessing his mother, her sister, and her mother reunited inside the House for the first time since even before he was born.
- Day 75: Baron was told that he had been forced out the House as a consequence of his second drunken stupor during the wee hours of Christmas which resulted in various violations, unintentional insults to Big Brother, and later, Gaby's ire. Donald returned to the House to fetch him.
- Day 77: Ruben and his partner were finally married at a nearby church. Later, Mariel and Ethel made their final exits. In the first of two tests set by Big Brother shortly afterwards, none of the five willed to answer which of them does not deserve to be in the "Big Four." In the second test, Ruben was unanimously voted by the others as the one deserving to be the "Big Winner" of the second Celebrity Edition.

=== Week 12 ===
- Day 78: Somehow pressured by the various signals and videos about what they did the night before and Big Brother's unwillingness to talk, the five housemates decided to answer which of them do not deserve to be in the "Big Four." But all five gained the X-medals, forcing Jon to "nominate" the two females for eviction. Unfortunately, a remark by Jon before nominations implied that something was afoot and their problems with Big Brother did not end at the moment of the "live nomination."
- Day 79: Jon finally admitted to that his remark somehow influenced the voting the night before. In fact, to seemingly support this, Ruben and Gaby confessed that it was not their intention to nominate their selections (Ruben chose Will; Gaby chose Ruben) rather than Riza. Big Brother reminded the five of following rules, but decided to hold out Jon's consequence to a later time in order not to spoil the revelry of New Year's Eve.
- Day 81: As consulted by Endemol, it was decided that regardless of his standing in the open voting, Jon would be given the forced eviction because of his violation of rules due to the implied influence of his remark during the "nomination" round three days before.
- Day 82: Bianca, together with several actors from the upcoming show Kung Fu Kids, entered the House to interview the "Big Four." It was only during the course of the interview that she had found out that she became a houseguest.
- Day 83: After some talk with the housemates and helping them with their coin tower, Bianca was told that she could leave. Immediately after her departure, she hosted the last episode of Über for the season.
- Day 84: The finale started with the "Big 4" still in the House. They presented a P20,000 check to Jon's chosen charity and each met with one of their loved ones before being escorted out of the House towards the Araneta Coliseum.

== Weekly tasks ==
Task No.	Date given	Description	Bet	Result
1	October 15, 2007 (Day 02)	Celebrity Choo Choo; Build a small toy railroad on the floor of the House. Task is successful if the toy train runs along the tracks without stopping.	50%	Passed
2	October 22, 2007 (Day 09)	Shadow Play; Perform a Japanese pantomime comedy skit wherein actors appear as if they are "performing" stunts in front of a black background.	50%	Passed^{T1}
3	October 29, 2007 (Day 16)	Gising na Gising! Must not exceed 25 hours of sleep as allotted by Big Brother for this week. The clock starts ticking as soon as one housemate closes his/her eyes and stops when everyone has their eyes open.	100%^{T2}	Passed^{T3}
4	November 5, 2007 (Day 23)	Celebrity Concert for a Cause; Organize a themed concert to be held on Day 28 in front of a live audience. Proceeds of the concert would go to the Cebu Provincial Detention and Rehabilitation Center.	100%	Passed
5	November 12, 2007 (Day 30)	Lipad Chopper Lipad; Learn how to fly a radio-controlled toy chopper and land it on a specific location. At the end of the week, seven housemates should successfully maneuver the toy chopper to the right direction.	75%	Failed^{T4}
6	November 19, 2007 (Day 37)	Lights, Camera, Action! Work on a 10-15 minute independently produced movie. They should work on the concept, story, props, and costumes, and were encouraged to improvise and maximize the use of all the things in the House.	75%	Passed^{T5}
7	November 27, 2007 (Day 45)	Wheelchair Basketball; Learn how to play wheelchair basketball and play against the Philippine national wheelchair basketball team in a 3-on-3 game.	75%	Passed^{T6}
8	December 4, 2007 (Day 52)	Karakter Ka; The housemates separate into two "families" of "anime" characters and compete in a series of tasks. Central to this is creating a short dubbing skit based on an episode of Naruto.	100%	Passed
9	December 10, 2007 (Day 58)	Parol! Create a giant eight-foot parol, complete with blinking lights of various colors. If successful, the lantern would have a special spot in Pampanga's lantern parade.	100%	Passed
10	December 17, 2007 (Day 65)	Walk to Bethlehem; Walk on the treadmill for 145 kilometers, the approximate distance Mary and Joseph said to have traveled from Nazareth to Bethlehem. Two housemates, dressed as Mary and Joseph, should do the task at a time, one walking on the treadmill and the other sitting or standing beside the treadmill.	100%	Passed
11	December 22, 2007 (Day 70)	Make their own 2008 calendar with a theme for each month. They will model on the pictures and will be provided costumes for the month theme pictures.	100%	Passed

Aside from the Weekly Tasks, the Housemates were also engaged in a Season-Long Task. This task involved monitoring, nursing, and taking care of a pregnant sow who is about give birth to piglets. It also involved taking care of the piglets themselves after they were born.

- ^Note T1: Though successful, the glass goblet and the candelabra that was broken by Baron and Mariel, respectively, was subtracted from their budget (P 500 and P 2,500 for a total of P 3,000).
- ^Note T2: Big Brother suggested the 100% bet so the housemates could organize a birthday party for Mcoy on Day 21 should they win.
- ^Note T3: Though successful, the articles broken during the week (the living room table and the chandelier in the men's bedroom) meant that they had no budget for the next week's groceries. Furthermore, an effort to save the budget (and Ruben and Baron's necks) also failed.
- ^Note T4: The housemates failed because they did not use the controls in flying the toy helicopters, which were made inoperable during the practice sessions. But for Baron's "King Kong" performance and Will's "most creative flight", Big Brother added P1,000 to the budget.
- ^Note T5: Despite Mcoy and Ethel's exit, the housemates accomplished the task in time. So Big Brother decided to double the entire budget instead of just adding the 75% that they won.
- ^Note T6: The final outcome was actually the result of a rematch requested by the housemates, even it meant risking the entire budget. The housemates lost their original match against the Philippine team by 20 points.

== Nomination history ==
The housemate first mentioned in each nomination gets two points, while the second gets one point. In the case of the two pairs known as "2-in-1 Housemates," the Housemate actually nominated is named first, with the color of the text denoting the pair: blue text for the Geisler brothers and pink text for Jen and Marylaine.

As stated earlier, the HoH gives an automatic nomination to any other housemate. The HoH is given an immunity from nominations.

Houseguests are also allowed to nominate fellow housemates, just to give them a feel of being in the House. However, nominations made by and nomination points bestowed upon a houseguest are not counted towards the vote count.

Pinoy Big Brother: Celebrity Edition 2 nomination history
	#1	#2	#3	#4	#5	#6	#7	#8	#9	#10	#11	#12	Big Night	Nominations received
Eviction day and Date	Day 14 October 27	Day 21 November 3	Day 28 November 10	Day 35 November 17	Day 38 November 20	Day 40 November 22	Day 49 December 1	Day 56 December 8	Day 70 December 22	Day 71 December 23	Day 77 December 29	Day 81 January 2	Day 84 January 5	Nominations received
Nomination day and Date	Day 7 October 20	Day 15; October 28	Day 22; November 4	Day 29; November 11	Day 36; November 18	Day 39; November 21	Day 43; November 25	Day 50; December 2	Day 63; December 15	Day 70; December 22	Day 71; December 23			Nominations received
Ruben	Marylaine; Baron	Baron; Victor	Baron; Yayo	Ethel ?	?	No nominations	Baron; Victor	Jon; Will	Baron; Riza	No nominations	No nominations	No nominations	Winner	11 (+1)
Riza	Megan; Jon	Megan; Zara	Gaby	Ethel; Megan	?	No nominations	Baron; Donald	Donald; Jon	Gaby; Yayo	No nominations	No nominations	No nominations	Runner-up	14
Gaby	Marylaine; Jon	Megan; Baron	Ethel; Victor	Voluntary Exit (Day 28)			Re-entered (Day 44)	Exempt	Baron; Riza	No nominations	No nominations	No nominations	3rd Place	3 (+1)
Will	Victor; Baron	Zara; Baron	Baron; Jon	Ethel; Megan	?	No nominations	Victor	Jon; Donald	Baron; Yayo	No nominations	No nominations	No nominations	4th Place	7
Jon	Riza; Jen	Baron; Zara	Baron; Ruben	Ethel ?	?	No nominations	Ruben; Baron	Will; Riza	Gaby	No nominations	No nominations	No nominations	Forced Eviction (Day 81)	8
Baron	2-in-1 connection with Donald (Days 1–38)					No nominations	Victor; Yayo	Will	Yayo; Ruben	No nominations	No nominations	Forced Eviction (Day 75)		12
Yayo	Marylaine; Megan	Megan; Zara	Megan; Victor	Ethel; Megan	?	No nominations	Riza; Baron	Jon; Will	Riza; Gaby	Voluntary Exit (Day 66)	Evicted (Day 71)			9
Gladys	Not in the House							Exempt	Voluntary Exit (Day 58)					0
Donald	2-in-1 connection with Baron (Days 1–38)					No nominations	Riza; Victor	Will; Jon	Evicted (Day 56)					3
Victor	Marylaine; Ethel	Riza; Zara	Yayo; Mcoy	Ethel ?	?	No nominations	Donald; Yayo	Evicted (Day 49)						12 (+1)
Ethel	Marylaine; Zara	Megan	Victor; Jon	Megan ?	?	No nominations	Voluntary Exit (Day 40)							18
Mcoy	Megan; Marylaine	Zara; Victor	Ethel; Baron & Donald	? Ethel	Baron & Donald; Victor	No nominations	Voluntary Exit (Day 40)							2
Baron Donald	Ruben; Zara	Zara; Victor	Ruben; Mcoy	Ruben	?	2-in-1 Connection split by Big Brother (Day 38)								22
Megan	Baron; Marylaine	Ruben; Baron	Baron; Will	? Ethel	Evicted (Day 35)									19
Zara	Marylaine; Baron	Baron; Riza	Evicted (Day 21)											12
Jen Marylaine	Megan; Ruben	Evicted (Day 14)												15
Notes	See note 1	See note 2	See note 3	See note 4	See note 5	See note 6	See note 7	See note 8	See note 9	None	See note 10			
Head of Household	No; HoH	Ethel	Riza	Baron & Donald	Will			Baron	Jon	No; HoH				
Up for eviction	Megan; Jen & Marylaine	Megan; Zara; Baron & Donald	Baron & Donald; Victor; Ethel; Gaby	Ruben; Megan; Ethel	Baron & Donald; Jon; Riza	Baron	Baron; Riza; Victor	Will; Jon; Donald	Baron; Gaby; Riza; Yayo	Gaby; Yayo	Open Voting			
Saved from eviction	Megan; 87.89%	Megan; 50.00% Baron & Donald; 31.94%	Baron & Donald; Ethel; Victor	Ruben; 54.76% Ethel; 23.72%	Jon; Riza	Baron; 91.69%	Riza; 60.66% Baron; 24.12%	Will; 39.42% Jon; 33.15%	Baron; Gaby; Riza	Gaby; 74.30%	Gaby; Riza; Ruben; Will		Ruben; 32.17%	
Evicted	Jen & Marylaine; 12.11%	Zara; 18.06%	No; Eviction	Megan; 21.52%	Baron & Donald	No Eviction; 8.31% to evict Baron	Victor; 15.22%	Donald; 27.43%	No; Eviction	Yayo; 25.70%	No; Eviction		Riza; 27.33% Gaby; 25.85% Will; 14.65%	
Forced Eviction	none										Baron	Jon	Riza; 27.33% Gaby; 25.85% Will; 14.65%	
Voluntary Exit	none		Gaby	none		Ethel; Mcoy	none	Gladys	Yayo	none			Riza; 27.33% Gaby; 25.85% Will; 14.65%	

^Note 1: Baron and Jen, who were the only ones who had yet to know about the "2-in-1 Housemates" twist, were unknowingly the ones who nominated for their respective partners, Donald and Marylaine respectively. Of course, Donald and Marylaine, who along with most of the other housemates knew of the twist by the end of the week, did not nominate anyone.
^Note 2: Donald made the nominations in the behalf of himself and his brother. Meanwhile, Ethel, being the HOH, named Megan for automatic nomination.
^Note 3: Although nominations were already announced on Day 22, Big Brother informed Gaby about a seminar in the state of Arizona in the United States that she told Big Brother she would attend. Since the said seminar would last three days, more than the 24 hours allowed by Big Brother, she was asked to decide whether to attend the seminar or not. The next day, Gaby ultimately decided to make a voluntary exit, nulling the nomination result. She would make her exit on Day 28. As a side note for the nomination round, Baron made the nominations for himself and his brother.
^Note 4: Because of time constraints, only reasons for Ethel and Megan's nomination and Donald's reason for imposing the automatic nomination to Ruben were seen by primetime viewers. The coronation night for Miss Earth 2007 was aired by ABS-CBN that night. The full tally was never published.
^Note 5: A nomination round occurred on Day 36 wherein the Geisler brothers, Riza, and Jon were "nominated." Unknown to the housemates, however, it was a just mock nomination because of Mariel's impending departure on Day 42. Baron & Donald's eviction from the House was just a Mock Eviction. They literally left the main House area but went into the secret room soon afterwards.
^Note 6: On Day 38, Big Brother decided to split Baron & Donald's 2-in-1 connection. On Day 39, Baron opted to let Donnie enter the house once again. On Day 40, the public decided to let Baron enter the house again, this time as a separate housemate from his brother. But on the wee hours of Day 40, after each having a rift with Big Brother, Mcoy and Ethel decided to leave the House altogether.
^Note 7: Will was still given the power of automatic nomination, although no one knew about this. Because Will gave Victor two points, Victor was automatically nominated even though he would be nominated anyway.
^Note 8: Gladys could neither nominate nor be nominated because she had just entered the House. The same could be said for Gaby, who had just returned to the House.
^Note 9: Gladys left the House on Day 58 due to depression and boredom. The next day, Ethel re-entered the House, this time as a Houseguest. On the nomination night itself, nominations were done face to face. Three days after the nomination night, however, Yayo opted to quit because of her mother's death, nulling all voting and saving Baron, Gaby, and Riza from eviction.
^Note 10: It was mentioned in the program that the seventh nomination night would be the last one. It can be deduced that starting on Day 71, open voting would occur to determine the "Big Four." On Day 75, Baron was given the forced eviction because of the grave violations he caused due to his second intoxication. Because of this development, Day 77 was just a normal night rather than the penultimate eviction night. Four days later, Jon was automatically shut out of the "Big Four" because of grave violations involving nominations.

=== Special Voting ===
Big 5

Gaby	Jon	Riza	Ruben	Will
Ruben	Riza; Gaby	Jon	Will	Gaby
Riza	Riza; Gaby	Jon	Riza	Gaby

Notes:
Note A: On Ruben and Gaby's votes: The first name refers to the person whom they mentioned during the Live nominations. The second name refers to the person whom they actually wanted to nominate (later revealed to Big Brother).
Note B: On Jon's votes. Jon was asked to give two automatic nominations. He voted for Riza in the first round of nominations.

Special Voting: Head of Household

Donald	Jon
Gaby; Baron; Gladys	Ruben; Riza; Will; Yayo

2-in-1 Housemates Breakdown of Votes

Baron & Donald			Jen & Marylaine		
Baron	Donald	Baron & Donald	Jen	Marylaine	Jen & Marylaine
22	0	3	1	14	0

Notes:
Note C: Mock Nomination is not included.
Note D: Nomination 4 wasn't completely shown to the public. Hence, nomination totals is incomplete.
Note E: Head of Household (HoH) Voting is not included in the counting as it does not affect nominations.
Note F: Big 5 "voting" is not included in the counting.

== Head of Household ==
A new twist introduced in this edition is the Head of Household (HoH). The housemate who holds this title has privileges and roles that are distinctly different from HouseGuests who hold the same title in the US version. The privileges and roles bestowed on the HoH are:

- The use of the special shower room, as well as picking a housemate who would use it as well. In the fourth week, the privilege of watching a movie and the use of a spa menu were added.
- Immunity from being nominated in the next nomination round.
- The power to automatically nominate a housemate for eviction.
- Has a specific perk that is related to his/her personality or profession outside the House.

Every week, an HoH competition is held to determine the housemate who would hold the title. In case one-half of a 2-in-1 Housemate wins the title, the other half earns the title as well. But only one of the two partners can compete and they can decide who should compete. Nominees for eviction are usually exempted to compete.

In the third competition onwards, however, the nominees for eviction were allowed to compete, but in the case the winner gets evicted at the end of the week, the runner-up of the game takes over as HOH.

== The Big Night at The Big Dome ==
The finale in this edition, held on January 5, 2008, at the Smart Araneta Coliseum was dubbed "The Big Night at the Big Dome". It had a Hollywood awards night theme with a cabaret-style opening number with Mcoy, Toni Gonzaga, Nikki Gil, and Vina Morales leading. All housemates were present, except for Gladys, who was in the United States.

Like the finale for the second regular season, the only other highlights of the show were the chronology of season and a spoof number, with Ethel and four impersonators as the "Big Four". There was also a special number by Yeng Constantino, Ryan Cayabyab, the Ryan Cayabyab Singers, and the Teen housemates of the first Teen Edition.

After an estimated total of 1.6 million text votes gathered since December 23, the start of the open voting, Ruben Gonzaga was declared the winner with 506,402 votes or 32.17%. Riza Santos was second with 430,135 votes or 27.33% of the vote. Gaby Dela Merced ended up third with 406,892 votes or 25.85% while Will Devaughn came in last at 230,509 votes or 14.65%.

Ruben was the first male housemate who become the Big Winner in the entire history of the Pinoy Big Brother franchise.

== Notes ==
Preceded by Season 2	Pinoy Big Brother Celebrity Edition 2 (October 14, 2007–January 5, 2008)	Succeeded by Teen Edition Plus
