= MoneySense (Philippines) =

MoneySense is a Filipino personal finance magazine published on a bimonthly basis by MoneyTree Publishing Corp.

MoneySense targets middle and upper-middle income readers who want to know about the best ways to earn, save, spend, borrow, invest, and protect their money.
