= Antique National School =

Public high school in Antique, Philippines

- Pambansang Paaralan ng Antique

Location
- T.A. Fornier Street; San Jose de Buenavista, Antique; Philippines; 10°45′03″N 121°56′32″E

Information
- Type: Public secondary school
- Established: 1906
- Authority: Department of Education
- Principal: Mr. Roger A. Jomolo
- Enrollment: 6,669
- Campus type: Urban
- Nickname: ANS
- Website: antiquenationalschool.ph

Antique National School (ANS; Filipino: Pambansang Paaralan ng Antique) is a public co-educational secondary school located along T.A. Fornier Street, San Jose de Buenavista, Antique, Philippines. Established in 1906, it is the oldest and largest public secondary institution in the province of Antique, serving an annual student population of over 5,000 learners.

== History ==
The institution traces its origins back to 1906 when it was established in San Jose de Buenavista. It was officially named as Antique High School in 1918 and relocated to its current site along T.A. Fornier Street in 1927. Following its temporary closure during World War II, the campus reopened in 1945.

The school was elevated to a national school status in 1963 through the passage of Republic Act No. 3657, legislation sponsored by alumnus and Representative Tobias Fornier.

Between 2009 and 2012, the institution partnered with the International Labour Organization (ILO) under a UN Joint Programme to implement localized entrepreneurial curriculums and structural tech-vocational facilities, including institutional food services, clothing textile shops, and vermiculture projects. This programmatic intervention significantly minimized drop-out parameters and grew the operational footprint to over 6,000 active secondary enrollees.

== Campus ==
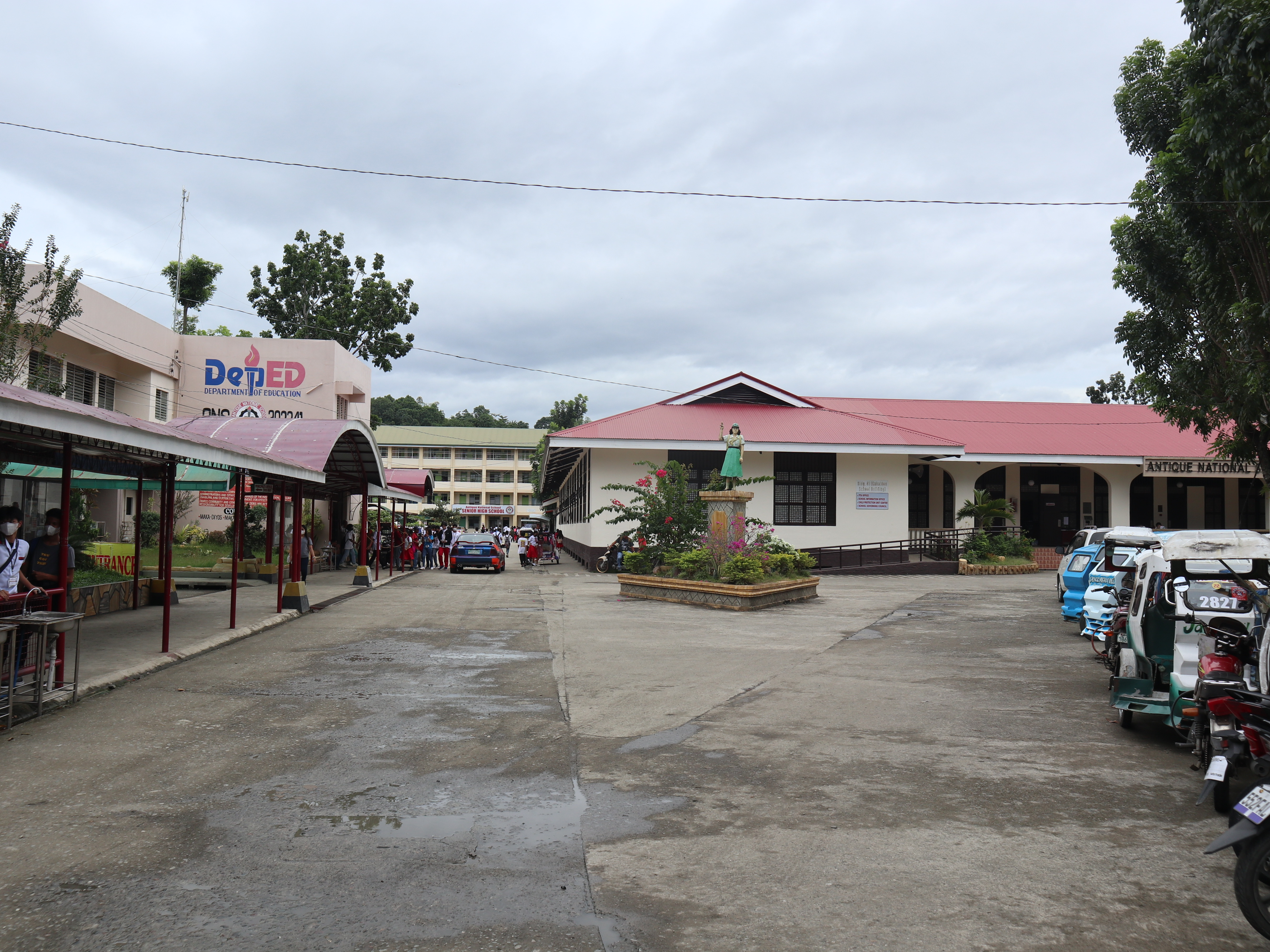
The main campus grounds of Antique National School along T.A. Fornier Street.

The campus is situated along T.A. Fornier Street in the provincial capital of San Jose de Buenavista. To accommodate its large student body, the physical infrastructure encompasses 150 dedicated classrooms alongside 45 specialized instructional workshops and laboratories used for technical-vocational tracks. Due to classroom shortages resulting from historically high enrollment volumes, the campus adapts its facilities when necessary, which has included converting its old gymnasium complex into temporary learning spaces.

The campus grounds and adjacent plazas also serve as major hubs for provincial civic and athletic assemblies. The school's open spaces are utilized as official assembly and staging points for large-scale national events, such as serving as the primary delegation convergence ground during the opening ceremonies of the Palarong Pambansa.

== Administration and Faculty ==
The school is administered under the leadership of its principal, Mr. Roger A. Jomolo. The school's instructional operations are supported by a large faculty network divided by academic tiers. As of 2025, the institution's teaching staff comprises 215 dedicated personnel serving the Junior High School department, 83 specialized instructors handling Senior High School tracks, and 33 overarching non-teaching administrative support staff members.

== Academic programs ==
Antique National School operates under the guidance and curriculum standards of the Philippine Department of Education (DepEd). It provides both lower secondary and upper secondary education tracks.

- Junior High School (JHS): Features the standard Basic Education Curriculum (BEC), Night Secondary (NS) options, a Special Program in the Arts (SPA), a Special Program in Sports (SPS), and the Science and Technology Engineering (STE) program.
- Senior High School (SHS): Offers the Academic Track consisting of the Accountancy, Business and Management (ABM) strand, the Science, Technology, Engineering, and Mathematics (STEM) strand, and the Humanities and Social Sciences (HUMSS) strand. It also hosts specialized Technical-Vocational-Livelihood (TVL) educational tracks, with the institution operating as one of the pilot schools testing the revised Senior High School curriculum featuring streamlined academic and technical-professional tracks.

== Notable alumni ==
- Tobias A. Fornier – Former Representative of Antique's lone legislative district who sponsored Republic Act No. 3657, which officially elevated the school to national status on June 22, 1963.
- J. Elizalde Navarro – Painter and sculptor who was posthumously proclaimed a National Artist of the Philippines for Visual Arts in 1999.
- Atty. Abdiel Dan Elijah "Ade" Fajardo – Prominent lawyer who served as the National President of the Integrated Bar of the Philippines (IBP)
- Randy M. Tacogdoy – Celebrated cultural worker, Kinaray-a poet, and theater scriptwriter who was named the Antique National School Centennial Most Outstanding Alumnus in the field of Culture and the Arts.
