= EDSA Shrine =

Catholic church in Quezon City, Philippines

- National Shrine of Mary, Queen of Peace
- Mary, Queen of Peace Shrine; Our Lady of Peace Quasi-Parish
- The church beside Robinsons Galleria in Ortigas Center
- EDSA Shrine
- 14°35′32″N 121°03′31″E
- Location: EDSA (C-4) corner Ortigas Avenue, Ugong Norte, Quezon City
- Country: Philippines
- Denomination: Catholic
- Website: www.edsashrine.org

History
- Status: Complete
- Founded: December 8, 1989
- Dedication: Mary, Queen of Peace
- Dedicated: December 15, 1989
- Consecrated: December 15, 1989

Architecture
- Functional status: Active
- Heritage designation: Important Cultural Property
- Designated: 2019
- Architect: Francisco Mañosa
- Architectural type: Church building
- Years built: 1989
- Completed: December 8, 1989

Administration
- Archdiocese: Manila
- Deanery: Saint John the Baptist

Clergy
- Rector: Rev. Fr. Jerome Secillano
- Vicar: Rev. Fr. Edric Bedural

The National Shrine of Mary, Queen of Peace, also known as Mary, Queen of Peace Shrine, Our Lady of Peace Quasi-Parish and commonly known as the EDSA Shrine, is a small church of the Archdiocese of Manila located at the intersection of Ortigas Avenue and Epifanio de los Santos Avenue (EDSA) in Barangay Ugong Norte, Quezon City, Philippines. It is a declared Important Cultural Property by the National Commission for Culture and the Arts. Built in 1989 on donated land to commemorate the People Power Revolution, the shrine is the site of two peaceful demonstrations that toppled Presidents Ferdinand Marcos in 1986, and Joseph Estrada (the EDSA Revolution of 2001 or EDSA II). The EDSA Shrine is the northernmost tip of the Ortigas Center, a financial and commercial district occupying large tracts of land in Quezon City, Mandaluyong, and Pasig.

== History ==
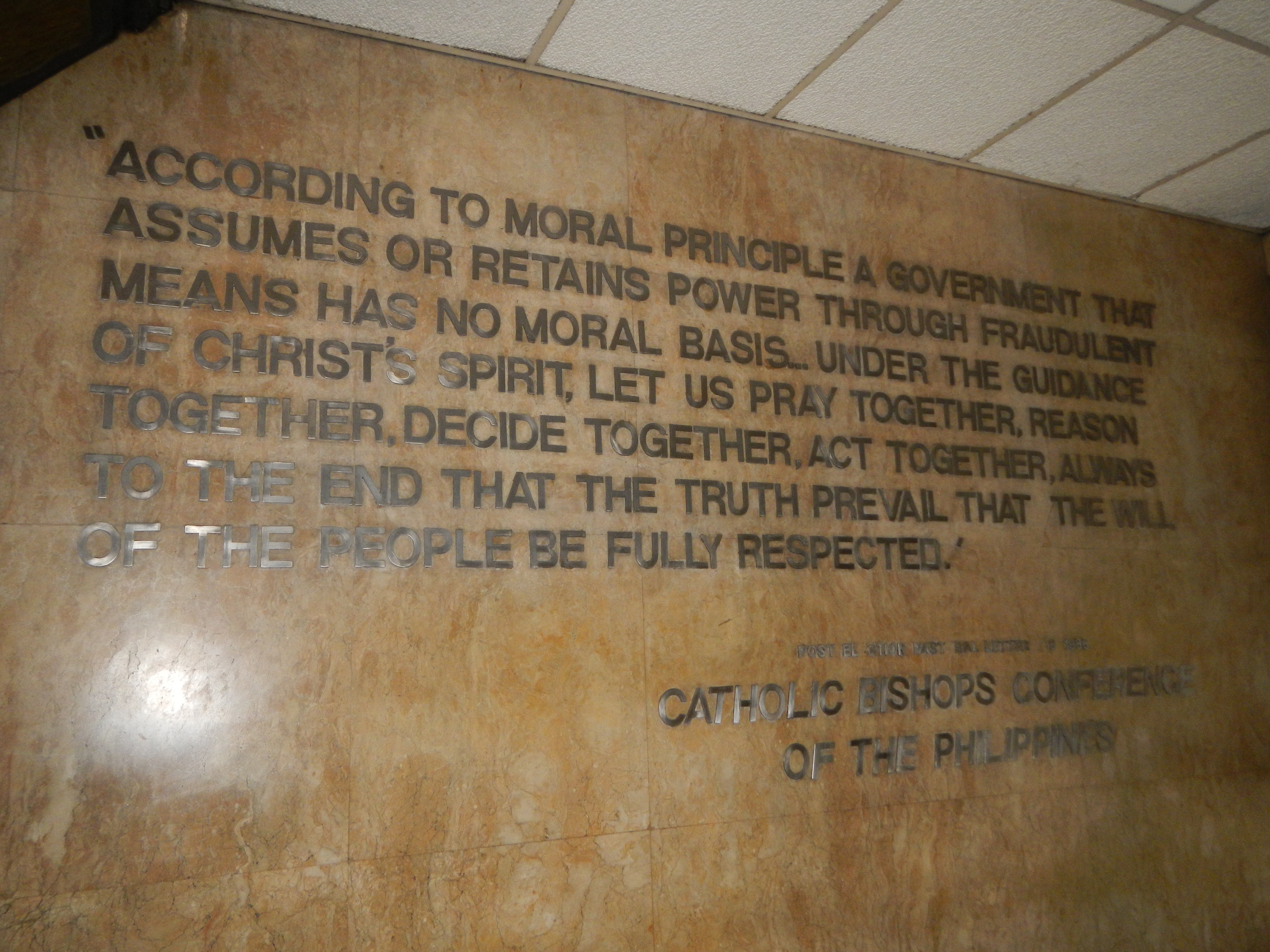
An excerpt from a pastoral letter issued by Cardinal Ricardo Vidal, Archbishop of Cebu and President of the CBCP, on February 13, 1986, days after the snap elections.

Cardinal Jaime Sin, the Archbishop of Manila, proposed the construction of a commemorative shrine two days after the Marcos family went into exile following the People Power Revolution of February 1986 which saw the deposing of President Ferdinand Marcos, the end of his authoritarian regime and the installation of Corazon Aquino as his successor. Sin made the proposal as an act of thanksgiving to the Virgin Mary, to whom devout Catholics attribute the success of the peaceful revolution. The “miracle” honors the Rosary and Our Lady of EDSA's role in the peaceful victory.

The concept for a commemorative shrine emerged when Sin and his Auxiliary Bishop and former secretary Gabriel V. Reyes were en route to Camp Aguinaldo to say a thanksgiving Mass. At a corner of Epifanio de los Santos and Ortigas Avenues, Reyes pointed out to Sin the site where a group of protesters, including Catholic religious sisters, offered flowers to soldiers during the revolution. At an empty lot nearby stood two billboards of advertisements by the Family Rosary Crusade, featuring the Virgin Mary along with the slogans "The family that prays together stays together" and "A world at prayer is a world at peace". The two prelates concluded the success of the revolution was a miracle attributed to the intercession of the Virgin Mary. They also compared the event to the Battle of Lepanto and Battles of La Naval de Manila, which both ended in victories for the Catholic belligerents (i.e., the Venetians and Spaniards in Lepanto against the Muslim Ottoman Empire, and the Spaniards against the Protestant Dutch Republic in Manila).

Cardinal Sin convinced the Ortigas and Gokongwei families to donate the corner lot where the EDSA Shrine now stands today The shrine was initially planned to be built inside Camp Crame, but plans were scrapped because churches built on state-owned property had to be ecumenical in nature.

EDSA Shrine was then constructed with Francisco Mañosa as architect. Leandro Locsin and William Coscolluela was also involved with the preparatory work of the building. The construction was almost finished by November 1989 and the shrine was set to be inaugurated by December 8, 1989, the date of the Feast of the Immaculate Conception. However such plans were interrupted by a coup attempt which began on November 29, 1989 by the Reform the Armed Forces Movement against President Corazon Aquino.

The coup attempt ended on December 7, 1989, and the inauguration went as planned which was never postponed by Cardinal Sin. The church was consecrated and dedicated to the Virgin Mary on December 15, 1989, while Socrates Villegas, then a priest, was installed as the church's first rector.

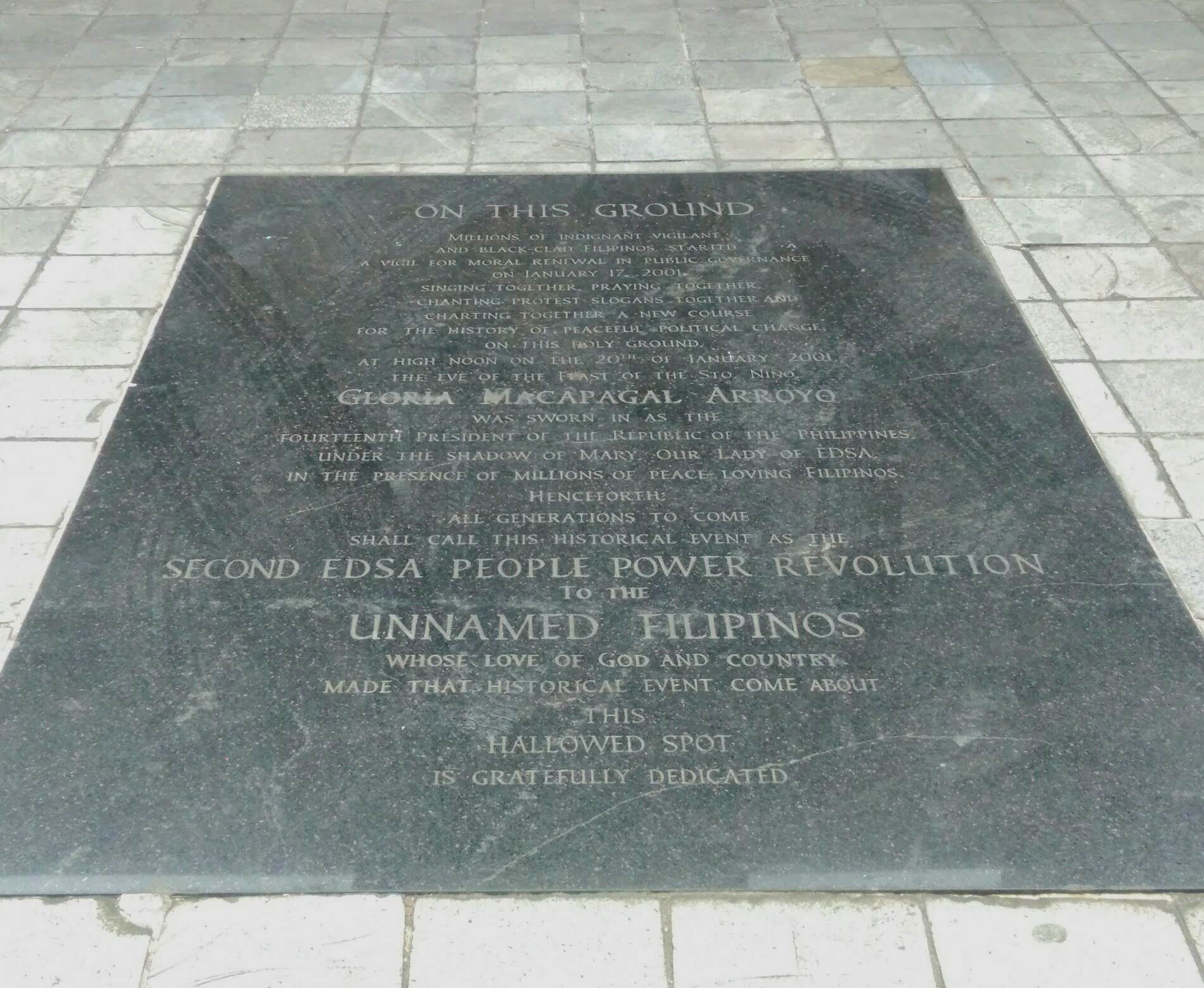
Marker commemorating the events of the Second EDSA Revolution

When the Second EDSA Revolution was successful in deposing President Joseph Estrada in January 2001, Cardinal Sin declared the EDSA Shrine as holy ground, and crediting the Virgin Mary with the victory. A marker was installed on the anniversary of the 1986 People Power Revolution, recognizing the shrine as a "Holy Ground". On the lower part of the podium is a set of reliefs recalling the events of the First and Second People Power Revolutions, the latter which was held there at the shrine.

Other rallies and demonstrations held at the shrine were: Pro-Estrada rally (April 25 – May 1, 2001), protests against Reproductive Health Bill (August 4, 2012), EDSA Tayo rally against pork barrel (September 7, 2013), 2015 Iglesia ni Cristo protests (August 27–31, 2015), Lord, Heal Our Land concelebrated Mass (November 5, 2017), and the Trillion Peso March (September 2025 – February 2026). In 2019, the National Commission for Culture and the Arts declared the church as an Important Cultural Property.

On February 25, 2024, at Mass for the 38th anniversary of the People Power Revolution, Pablo Virgilio David, Bishop of Kalookan and President of the Catholic Bishops' Conference of the Philippines (CBCP), said EDSA Shrine was not only for the Archdiocese of Manila but for the entire country. On January 25, 2025, the CBCP made the church a National Shrine, along with the Shrine of Our Lady of Mercy in Novaliches and San Mateo Church in Rizal.

== Dedication ==
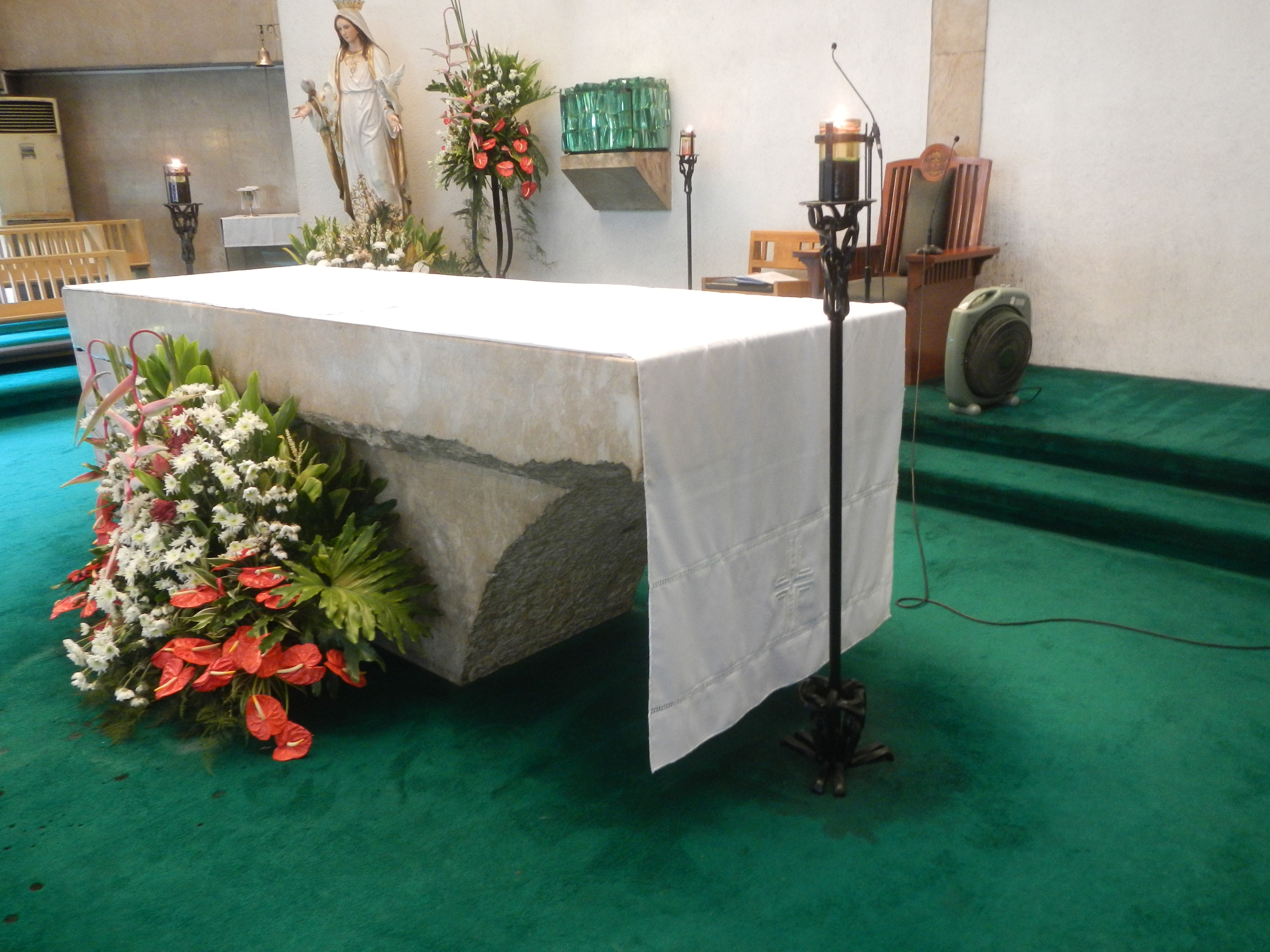
Church altar in 2016

Our Lady of Peace, Mother of Peace, Queen of Peace or Our Lady Queen of Peace is a title of the Blessed Virgin Mary in the Catholic Church. She is represented in art holding a dove and an olive branch – both traditional symbols of peace. The patronal image for this particular shrine is unique, as its design follows that of the statue atop the shrine roof. Mary, crowned and clad in golden robes, has her arms outstretched and her Immaculate Heart exposed, while two or three white doves rest at her hands and feet.

Her official memorial in the General Roman Calendar is on July 9 in the universal Church except for Hawaii and some churches in the United States, where it is kept on January 24.

== Architecture and design ==
"People's Basilica"; The initial unused proposal of Francisco Mañosa for the EDSA Shrine

Francisco Mañosa was responsible for the architectural and structural design of the EDSA Shrine. The National Commission for Culture and the Arts (NCAA) described Mañosa's take on the building's design as a "modern take on Filipino architecture and adaptation of tropical architecture". The building is also noted for its "neovernacular" style and its distinguished "native architectural forms and indigenous materials" by architecture historian Gerard Lico.

The EDSA Shrine's design consisted of a promenade, the People's Plaza, with a statue of the Virgin Mary sculpted by Virginia Ty-Navarro as its focal point, and an underground church which was inspired from the Cathedral of Brasília.

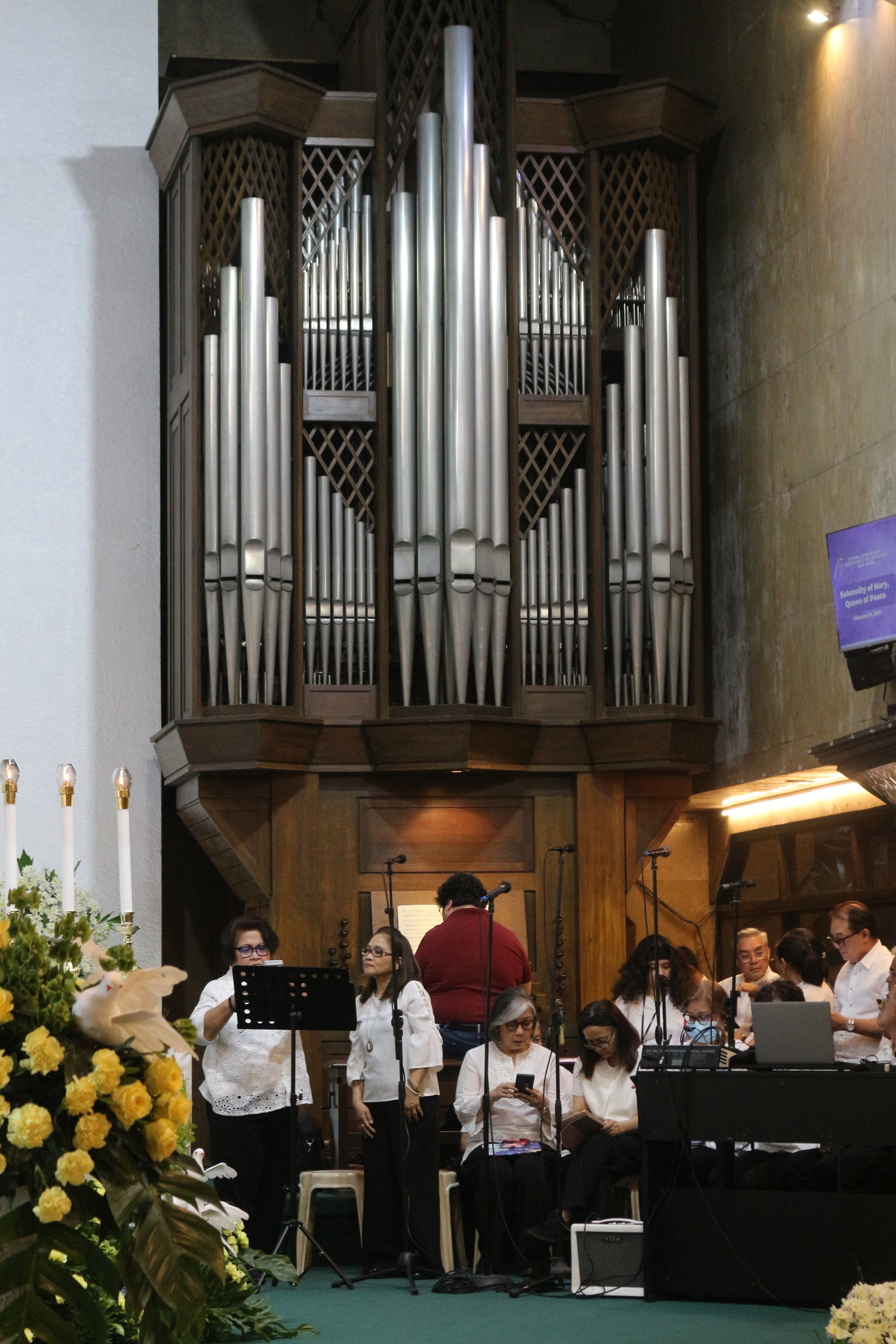
Organ of the shrine at the right side of the sanctuary

Mañosa envisioned a different design from the existing building. The architect's vision for the shrine, which he dubbed as the "People's Basilica" is derived from the concept of the bahay kubo but on a larger scale. The initial design called for the use of seven pitched roofs clustered together to frame a statue of the Virgin Mary. However one influential member of the committee objected to this in favour of a Spanish colonial design, which caused Mañosa to withdraw from the project. He was ultimately convinced by Cardinal Jaime Sin to stay, resulting in his design for the present church.

== Our Lady of EDSA sculpture ==
Our Lady of EDSA
- Artist: Virginia Ty-Navarro
- Year: 1989
- Medium: Bronze
- Subject: Virgin Mary, under the title "Our Lady of EDSA, Queen of Peace"
- Dimensions: 10.7 m × 3.5 m (35 ft × 11 ft)
- Weight: 8 t (8,000 kg)
- Location: EDSA Shrine, Quezon City

The sculpture of the Virgin Mary as Our Lady of EDSA, Queen of Peace, is a prominent feature of the church. The committee behind the construction of the EDSA Shrine commissioned sculptor Virginia Ty-Navarro after initially considering National Artist for Sculpture Napoleón Abueva, who was recovering from a stroke at the time. Manny Casal was the second choice, and he had proposed a marble sculpture of the Virgin Mary with open arms comforting people of various backgrounds: laity, clergy, children, and soldiers. Casal intended the sculpting to be done on-site. While not selected to create the final image, Abueva and Casal nonetheless contributed other works within shrine grounds.

Ty-Navarro sculpted the Virgin Mary sculpture in her studio in San Juan. The sculpture was then transported to the shrine by helicopter with assistance from the United States embassy due to Ty-Navarro not anticipating the roads to the shrine were too narrow for the sculpture.

== Rectors ==
Name	Tenure
Socrates Villegas	December 8, 1989 – July 3, 2004
Victor Apacible	2004 – 2008
Leo Nilo Mangussad	2004 – 2015
Lazaro Abaco	July 1, 2015 – 2022
Jerome Secillano	2022 – incumbent

== See also ==
- People Power Monument
- Bantayog ng mga Bayani
- People Power Revolution
- Our Lady of Peace
- Archdiocese of Manila
