= Nature Church =

Roman Catholic church in Las Piñas, Philippines

- Mary Immaculate Parish Church
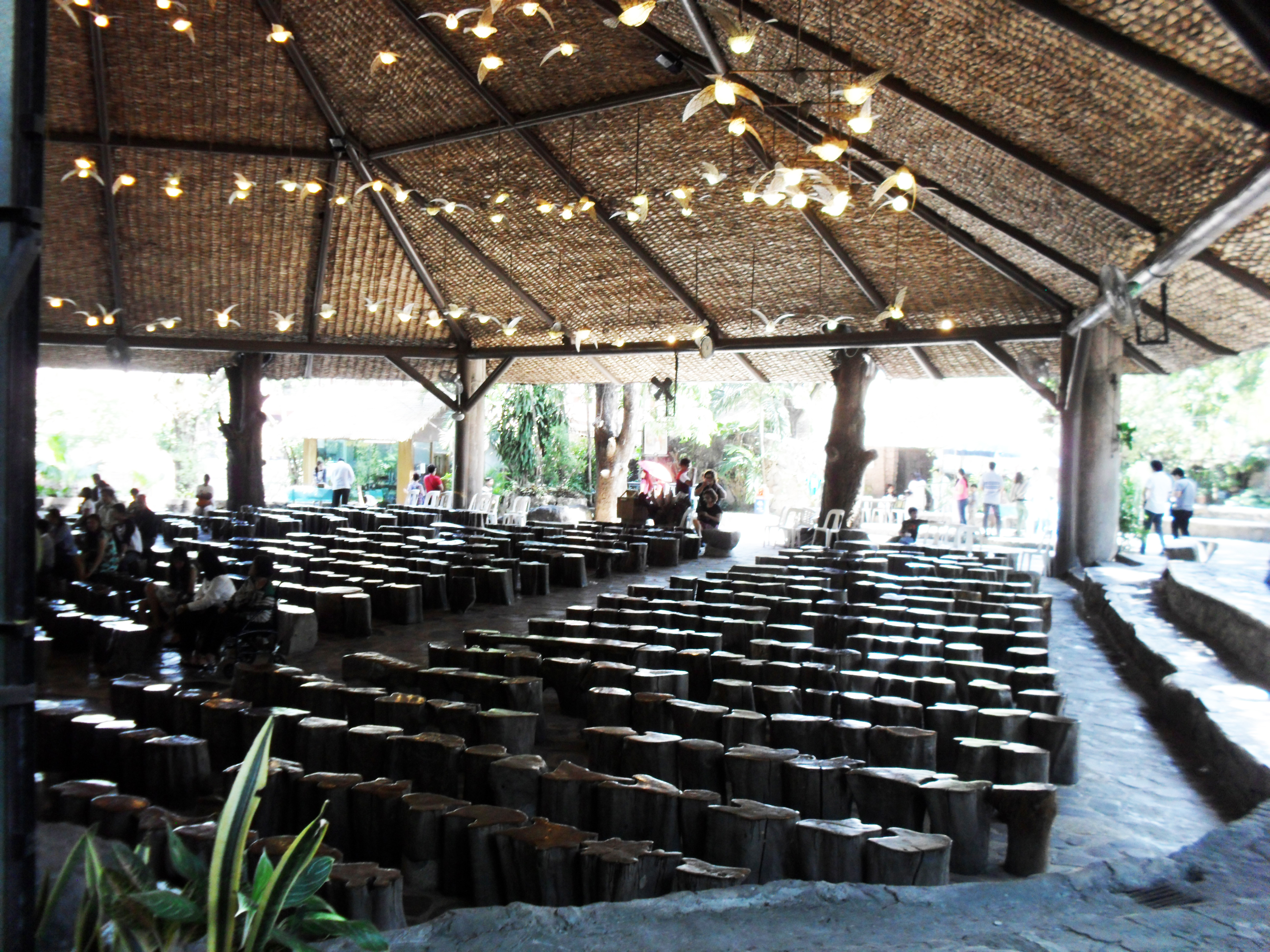
- Church interior in 2015, showing wooden seats

- Location in Metro Manila Location in Luzon Location in the Philippines
- 14°25′37″N 120°59′48″E
- Location: Las Piñas, Metro Manila
- Country: Philippines
- Denomination: Roman Catholic
- Website: mipnatureschurch.com

History
- Status: Parish church
- Founded: August 22, 1979
- Founder(s): Most Rev. Jaime L. Cardinal Sin, DD
- Dedication: Immaculate Conception
- Dedicated: December 8, 1979

Architecture
- Functional status: Active
- Architect: Francisco Mañosa
- Architectural type: Church building
- Style: Organic
- Groundbreaking: 1986
- Demolished: January 1, 2007 (fireworks incident)

Administration
- Province: Manila
- Diocese: Parañaque

Clergy
- Bishop(s): Most Rev. Jesse E. Mercado, DD, STL
- Priest: Rev. Fr. Wilfredo D. Torres

Mary Immaculate Parish Church, also known as Nature Church, is a Roman Catholic parish church located in Apollo III, Moonwalk Village, Talon V in Las Piñas, Metro Manila, Philippines. It is under the jurisdiction of the Diocese of Parañaque. The church is known for its "nature theme" representing the ideas of Fr. Pierino Rogliardi and the architectural advocacy of Francisco Mañosa. When it was built in 1986, it was only capable of accommodating 100 people. Beside the main church is the San Lorenzo de Manila Chapel, which is a smaller version of the main church, suited for more intimate church gatherings.

== History ==
The Mary Immaculate Parish originated from the Saint Joseph Parish located at Las Piñas' Barrio E. Aldana, well known for its Bamboo Organ, in an area where post-war new settlements were mushrooming and the need for spiritual nourishment was soon answered by a proliferation of chapels within villages.

Sometime later, when the Holy Family Parish was established in BF Almanza which was close to Talon, its new parish priest, Fr. Ernesto Joaquin, took in these chapels, including the Sto. Niño Chapel in Moonwalk. This site was later chosen to house the new church to be built in honor of Mary Immaculate.

On August 22, 1979, Jaime L. Cardinal Sin made the whole area of Talon, which comprises 40 subdivisions, into one parish under the name Mary Immaculate. He appointed Fr. Colin Apap and Fr. Victor Agius, both from Malta, as Parish Priest and Assistant Parish Priest, respectively. Fr. Collin was installed on September 8, 1979, while the church was dedicated on December 8, 1979.

Originally, the parish church was built out of the old Sto. Niño Chapel in Moonwalk Village, Las Piñas, but as the community and population grew, its later parish priest, Fr Pierino Rogliardi, saw the need for a larger church structure. Hence, the beginning of the building of the "Nature Church" complex, which would showcase Filipino organic architecture as championed by the chosen architect, National Artist Francisco "Bobby" Mañosa.

On December 8, 1987, the feast day of the Immaculate Conception, the new church was inaugurated.

== Architectural features ==
Architect Francisco Mañosa, together with Linggoy Alvarez who served as the landscaper, executed a nature concept for the church as the church would serve as the signature structure of the location's 4,000 square metres (43,000 ft^{2}) mango orchard. The idea was conceptualized by former parish priest Father Pierino Rogliardi. The nature concept of the church is reflected in different parts of the church.

=== Altar ===
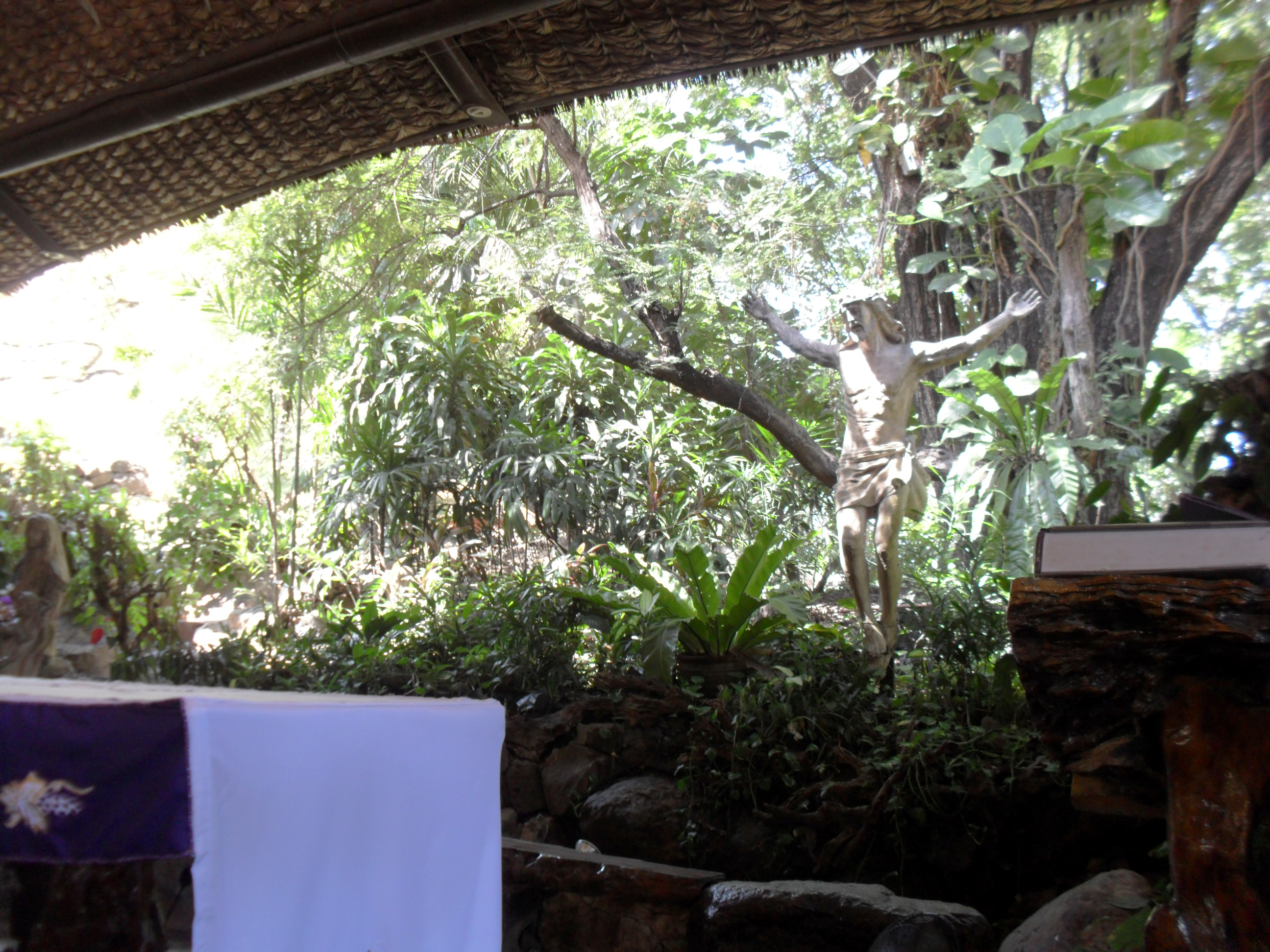
Church altar

Tropical palms and plants served as its backdrop. It provided privacy for prayer and meditation. The altar is a rough-finished coral marble slab resting on two madre cacao driftwood pedestals. Flat-topped boulders of various shapes and sizes line the altar and are used as seats by altar servers. The flooring of the altar section, similar to that of the aisles, is interplay of wood tiles from tree trunks cut crosswise and white pebble washout.

=== Roofing ===
The roofing has a suspended, funnel-shaped form. It was covered with the woven network of 40,000 anahaw leaves, considered as the biggest anahaw-covered roof in the Philippines. 176 dove-shaped capiz lanterns spiraling towards the center of the ceiling were installed.

=== Structural components ===
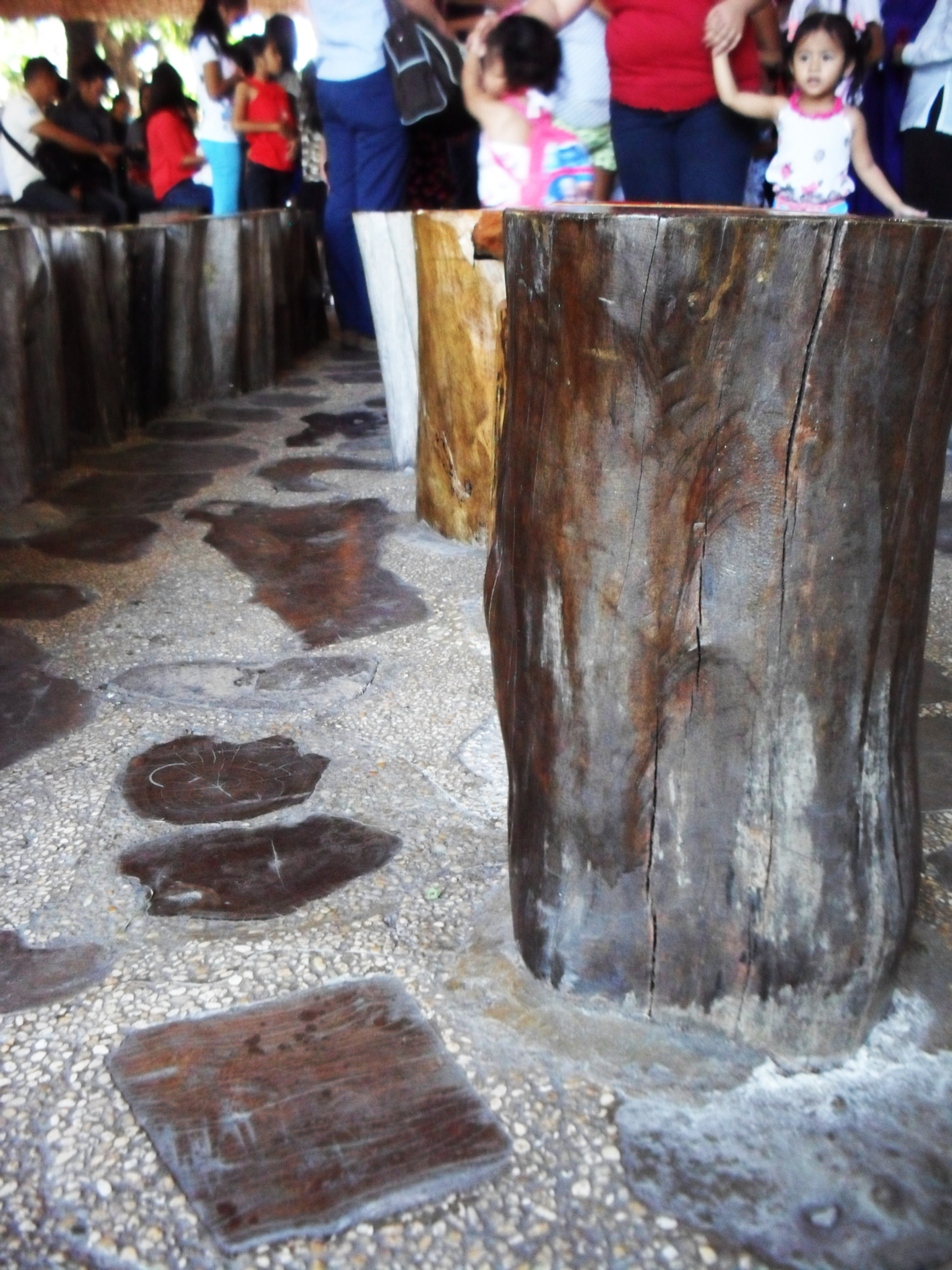
Kneeling area

Beams and pillar are made out of 50-year-old mango trees. Six concrete posts provide additional strength. The flooring is composed of patchwork of stones and wooden slabs with pebble washout.

=== Seats ===
Three sections of the assembly area are divided for seats. They are made out of fallen logs while kneelers are made out of flat pieces of wood.

=== Landscape elements ===
A rock garden is located below the altar. It is ornamented with greens of carabao grass, wild bougainvillea, pakpak lawin, and a collection of other fern varieties grown on driftwoods. A man-made waterfall is also located at the boulders of the altar. The lagoon underneath collects the water, decorated with water lilies.

== Present condition ==
A fire occurred on New Year's Day, 2007. A self-propelling firework called "kwitis" (rocket) ignited a fire at the roofing of the church along with its electrical and audio system while the wooden seats were scorched with falling embers. The church was rebuilt, integrating fire-resistant technology while still being faithful to Mañosa's original design. The church was re-opened and re-dedicated by Bishop Jesse Mercado on September 8, 2007.

== Parish priests ==
Since its establishment, Mary Immaculate Parish has been administered by diocesan priests affiliated with the Focolare Movement.

Name	Years of Pastorship	Diocese	Present Assignment
Rev. Fr. Colin Apap	1979–1984	Archdiocese of Malta	Resident Priest of The Parish of San Peter in Chains, Archdiocese of Malta
Rev. Fr. Pierino Rogliardi	1985–2003	Archdiocese of Turin	Deceased
Rev. Fr. Fidel G. Fabile	2003–2022	Diocese of Paranaque	Parochial Vicar of Madonna del Divino Amore Parish, Diocese of Paranaque
Rev. Fr. Wilfredo Jay D. Torres	2023–Present	Diocese of Tarlac	Current Parochial Administrator

== Programs ==
Mary Immaculate Parish runs a K–12 school (Mary Immaculate Parish Special School), a night school for adults, a pediatric and lying-in clinic, and a columbarium within the premises. The parish also established housing projects for the poor, notably Emmaus Village in Barangay Talon Singko.

== Gallery ==
=== Main Church ===
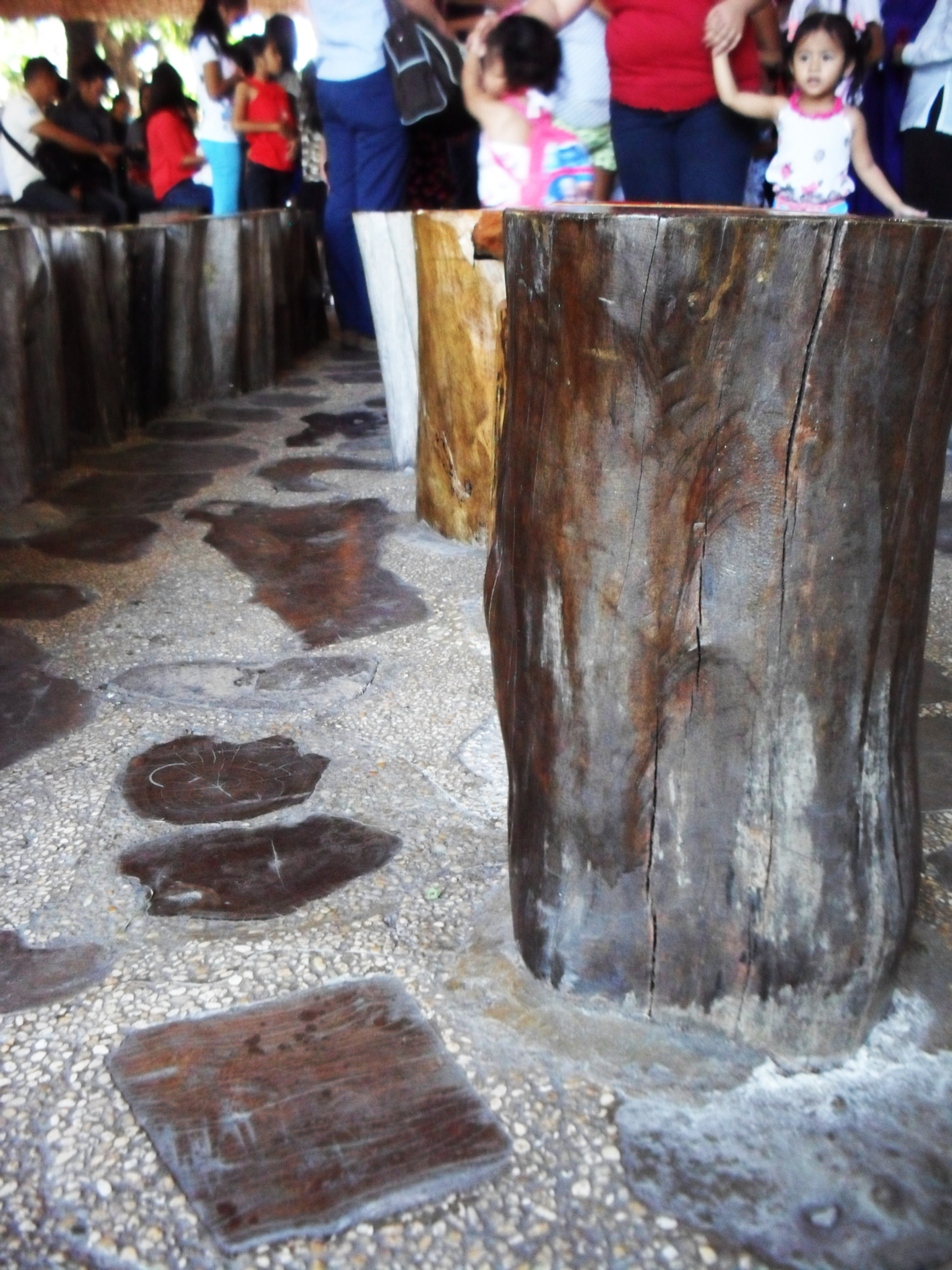
Kneeling area

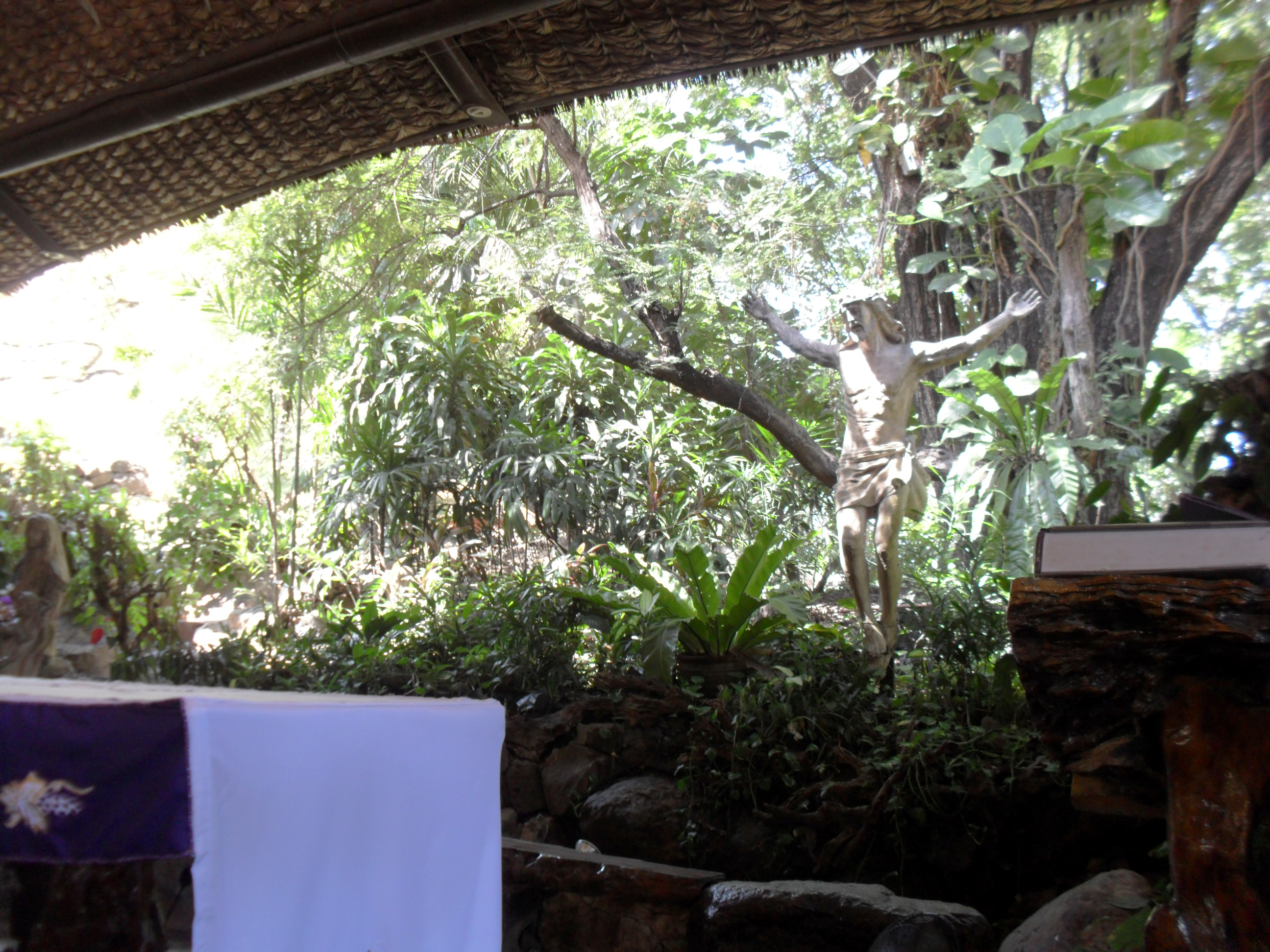
Altar of Nature Church

Ceiling of Nature Church

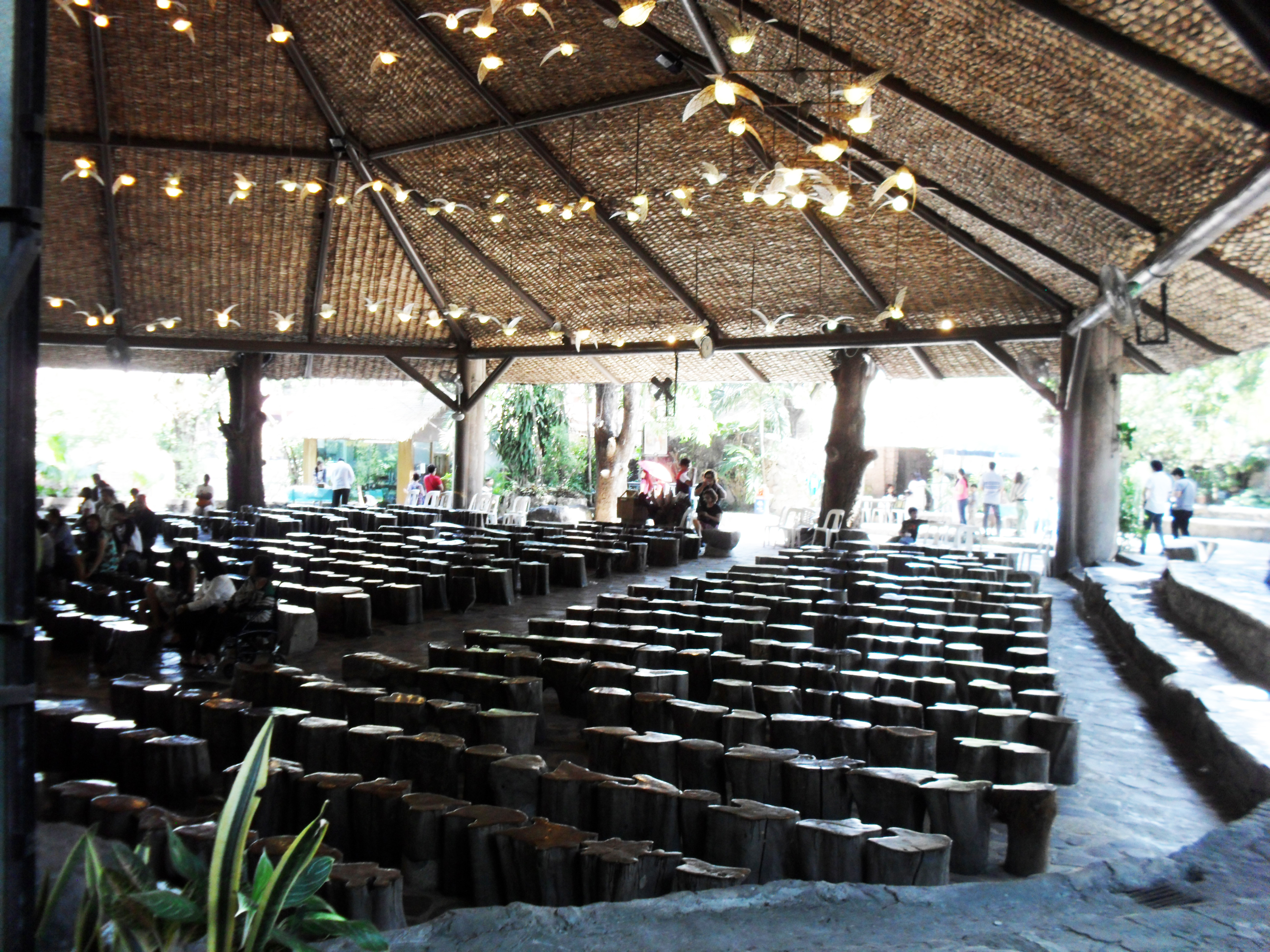
Wooden seats at Nature Church

=== San Lorenzo Ruiz de Manila Chapel ===
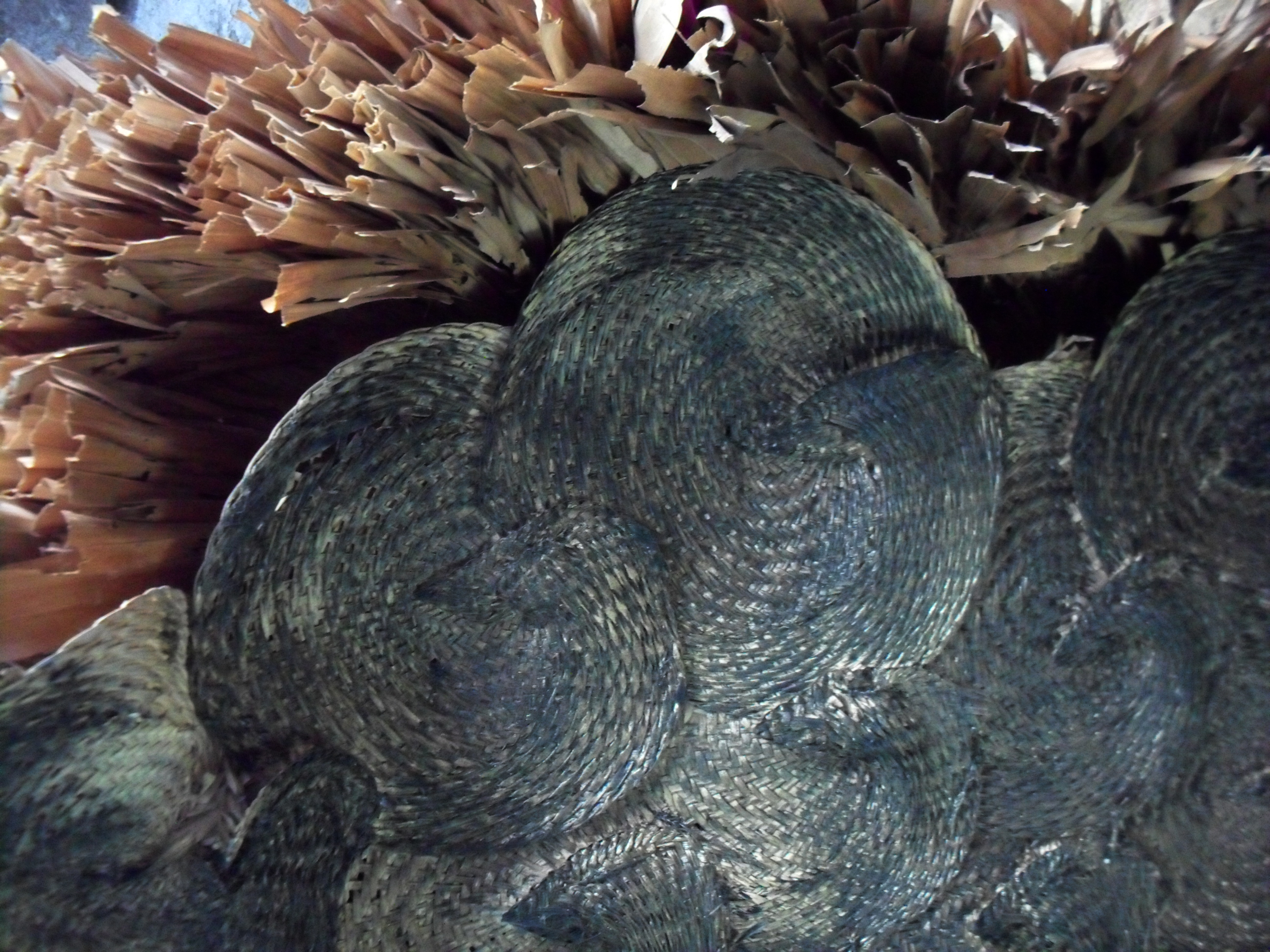
Abaniko-style ceiling finish

San Lorenzo Ruiz Chapel

San Lorenzo Ruiz Chapel Altar

=== Function halls ===
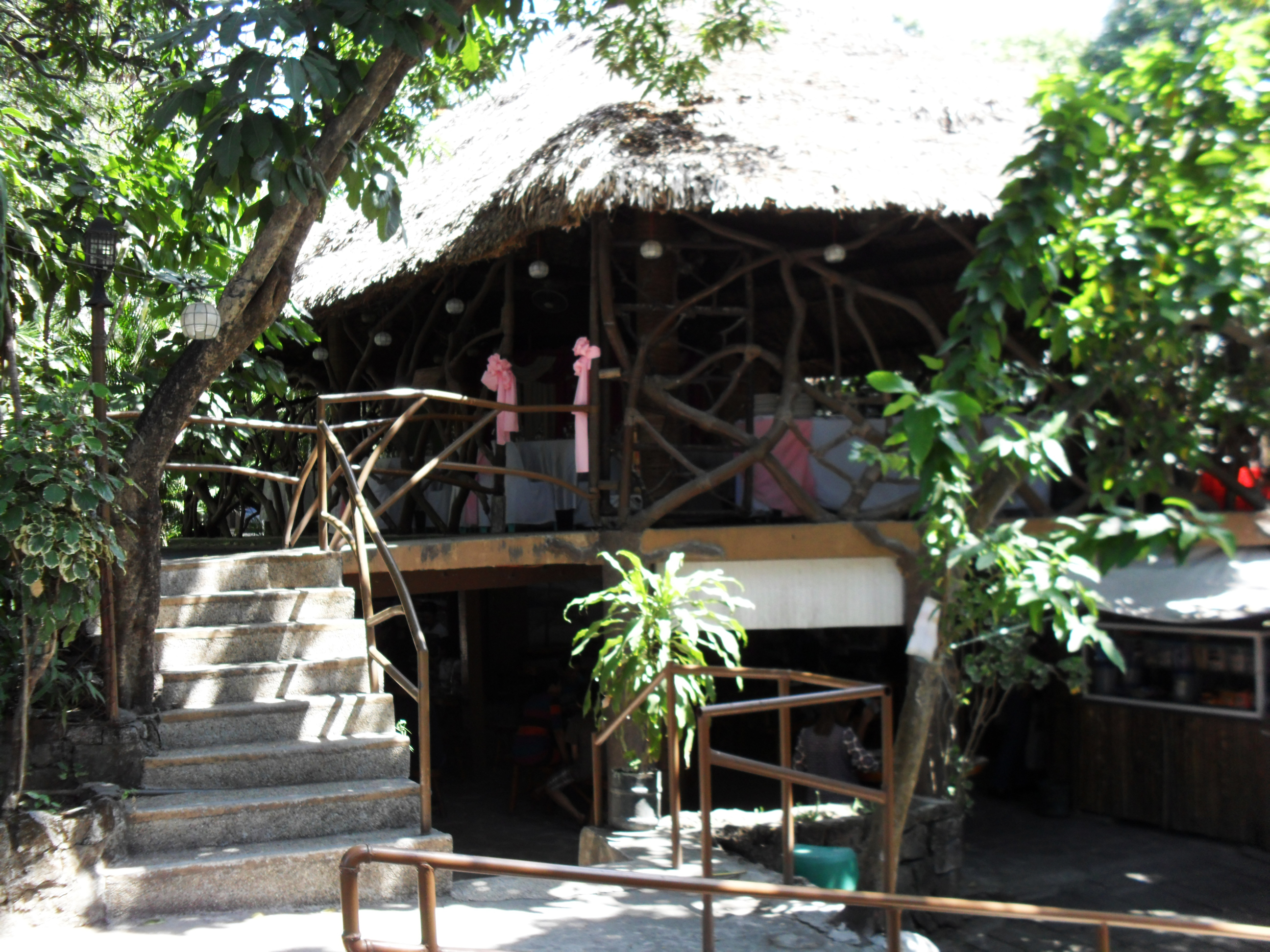
Banquet Hall

=== Ossuary Garden ===
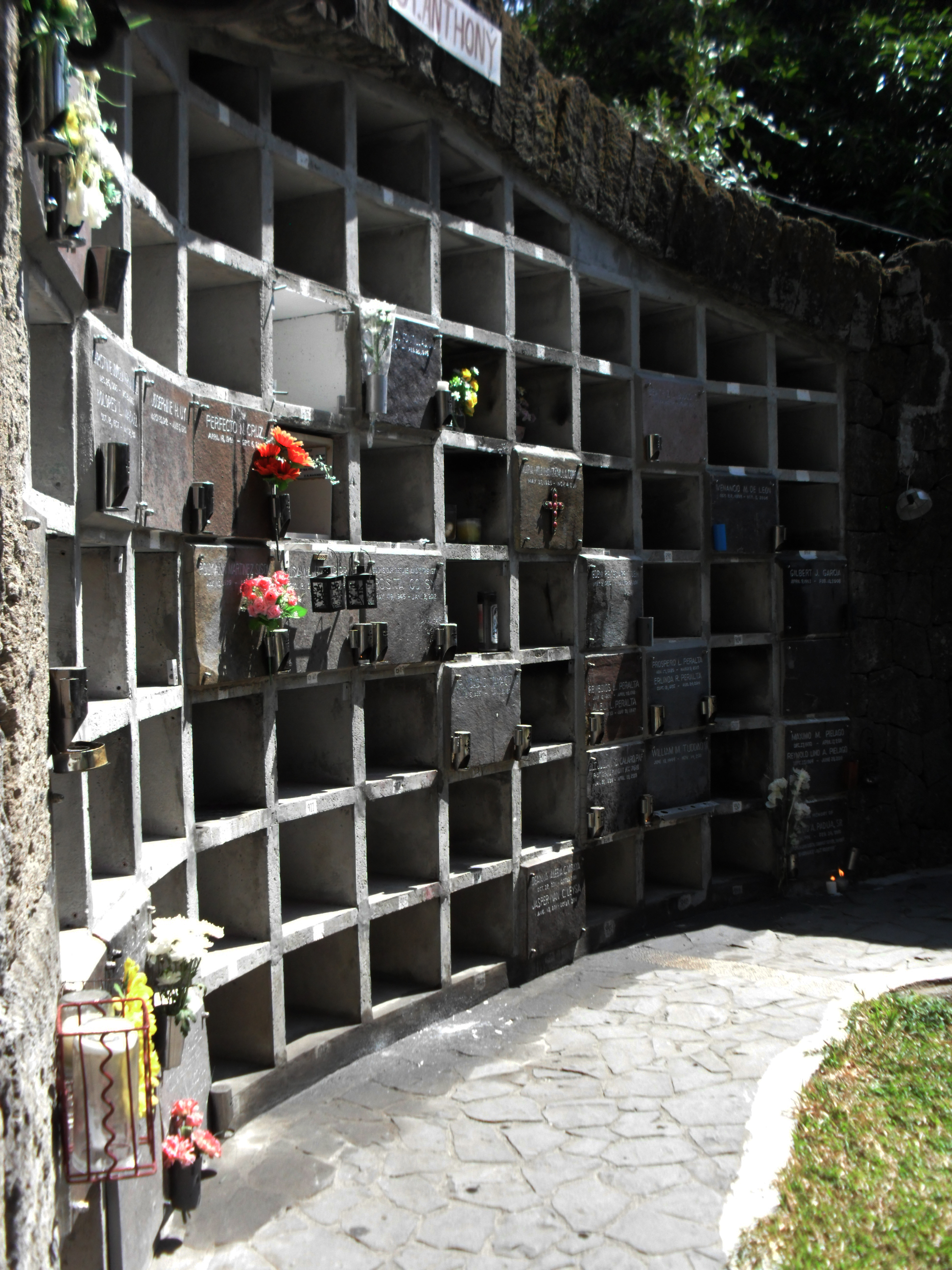
Saint Anthony Ossuary

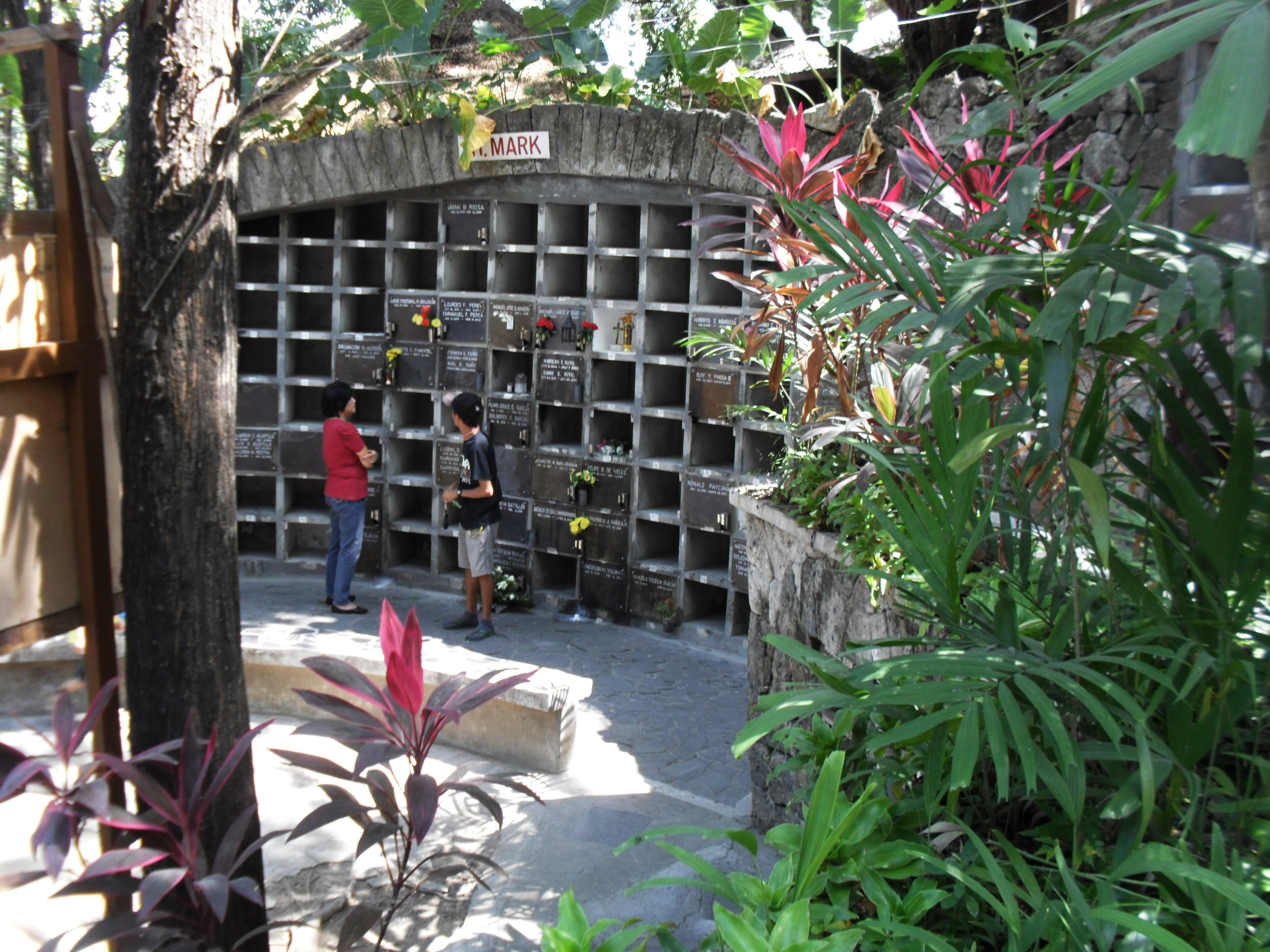
Saint Mark Ossuary
