= Francisco Mañosa =

Filipino architect (1931–2019)

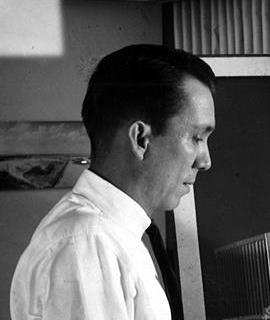
- Born: February 12, 1931; Manila, Philippine Islands
- Died: February 20, 2019 (aged 88); Muntinlupa, Philippines
- Education: University of Santo Tomas
- Occupation: Architect
- Awards: National Artists of the Philippines
- Practice: www.manosa.com
- Buildings: Coconut Palace, EDSA Shrine

Francisco "Bobby" Tronqued Mañosa (February 12, 1931 – February 20, 2019) was a Filipino architect considered one of the most influential Filipino architects of the 20th century for having pioneered the art of Philippine neovernacular architecture. His contributions to the development of Philippine architecture led to his recognition as a National Artist of the Philippines for Architecture in 2018.

Although he was popularly known as the architect of the Coconut Palace, his other notable works include the EDSA Shrine, the Mary Immaculate Parish (Nature's Church) in Las Piñas, the Davao Pearl Farm, and Amanpulo resorts.

Mañosa devoted his life's work to creating a Filipino identity in architecture, advocating design philosophies that harken "back to the bahay kubo and the bahay na bato,” and other traditional vernacular forms. Mañosa became known for combining these traditional forms and indigenous materials with modern building technology to create structures which he felt were those best suited to the Philippines' tropical climate.

== Early life and education ==
Mañosa was born in Manila, Philippines on February 12, 1931, growing up in a genteel neighborhood on Azcarraga Street (later renamed Recto Avenue). His parents were María Tronqued, one of the early actresses of Philippine Cinema, and Manuel Mañosa Sr., a Harvard-educated sanitary engineer who was director of the Metropolitan Waterworks and Sewerage System from 1947 to 1955.

Nicknamed "Bobby" in the American-inspired fashion of the era, he played jazz piano and initially wanted a career in music, but studied architecture at the University of Santo Tomas on the insistence of his father.

== Career ==
Mañosa was known for his advocacy of what has been called "Philippine neovernacular architecture." His design aesthetic incorporated Philippine design motifs and local materials such as coconut and local hardwoods.

=== Inspiration from Japan ===
Mañosa spent a year in Japan immediately after his graduation from college, because his father insisted that he spend "at least one year somewhere in the world" Mañosa opted to go to Japan, which had also inspired architect Frank Lloyd Wright.

He was struck by the way that Japanese architecture reflected a consistent design which drew from Japanese culture, regardless of how elaborate the building was, or whether it was traditional and modern. His wife Denise, whom he married at around this time, recounts that this experience inspired Mañosa to pursue a design aesthetic with a similar consistency, reflective of Filipino culture.

=== Inspiration from the Bahay Kubo ===
Upon coming home from Japan, Mañosa began working in the family architectural firm, Mañosa Brothers, with his brothers Manuel Jr. and José. But he began insisting that he take on projects that were Filipino in design, rather than the Modernist or International style buildings that were in vogue at the time.

Mañosa developed a modern architectural style whose touchstone was the traditional Filipino square house, the bahay kubo. He used indigenous materials and experimented with new technologies so that it would be usable in a modern context.

Philippine architecture historian Gerard Lico describes Mañosa's style, saying:

"His approach to traditional design is based on the ability of the architect to identify the essential building elements and to translate them into a contemporary image. His architecture is not a mere mechanical mimicry of vernacular architecture, which many would think to be locked in time. He initiated a contemporary mode that uses and revitalizes the knowledge from previous generations, recovering age-old constructive methods and finishing materials, emphasizing their optical and thermal qualities.”

Among his bahay kubo-inspired works are the stations of Manila Light Rail Transit Line 1 network.

=== Breakthrough: San Miguel Corporation Headquarters Building ===
Mañosa's breakthrough as an architect happened while he was still working at Mañosa Brothers, when the firm was hired to design the new headquarters of San Miguel Corporation in Mandaluyong. The brothers designed a building which was inspired by the Banaue rice terraces, with “green” design features which were ahead of the times.

=== The Coconut Palace ===
Mañosa's insitance on only taking on projects with a Filipino identity eventually led him to leave Mañosa Brothers and put up his own firm. Because he had built up his name designing the San Miguel Corporation headquarters, he was asked by Imelda Marcos to build the "Tahanang Pilipino" (lit. Filipino home, often referred to as the Coconut Palace), within the Cultural Center of the Philippines Complex.

The project became controversial, because the opulent design was paid for with government funds and was soon cited as a prominent example of Marcos' Edifice Complex excesses. The palace was completed in time for Pope John Paul II's visit in 1981 for the beatification of Lorenzo Ruiz. Mrs Marcos invited him to stay at the newly constructed palace, but the offer was declined by the Pope because it was too opulent given the level of poverty in the Philippines. But it eventually became a guest house for celebrity visitors of the Marcoses until they were deposed and exiled by the civilian-backed People Power Revolution in 1986.

Although the controversy and the relative disuse of the building since its construction, the Coconut Palace has come to be recognized as one of the most prominent examples of Philippine neovernacular architecture, and made Mañosa a highly-sought-after artist.

=== The EDSA Shrine ===
After the Marcoses were sent into exile in 1986, Cardinal Jaime Sin of the Archdiocese of Manila began conceiving of a shrine that would celebrate the People Power Revolution which had deposed them. Cardinal Sin's appeal for people to rally in the streets had played a pivotal role in assuring that the uprising succeeded without the need for bloodshed, and Philippines' large Catholic majority characterized its success a "miracle." So the Cardinal approached Mañosa about designing a shrine commemorating the event.

Mañosa had first proposed a completely different design for the shrine, above-ground and based on the bahay kubo. However, this design was disapproved when "an influential member of the committee" insisted on a Spanish design for the church. Mañosa walked out on the project, staying true to his "I design Filipino, nothing else" policy. Mañosa's wife later quoted him saying to the committee:

"A Spanish colonial church commemorating a Philippine revolution on Philippine soil? Never![....] I believe I am not your architect. I cannot do that to our country or to our people…”

Cardinal Sin asked Mañosa to reconsider, so Mañosa came back and developed a new "People’s Plaza" design which would be used for the actual project. The EDSA Shrine was completed in 1989.

=== The Parish church of St. Joseph (Bamboo Organ Church) ===
Between 1971 and 1975, the Saint Joseph Parish Church, home of the Las Piñas Bamboo Organ, and the surrounding buildings were restored to their 19th-century state by Mañosa and partner Ludwig Alvarez, through the administration of Rev. Fr. Mark Lesage, CICM, to bring back the 19th-century look of the church and to re-position the main altar to face the people, as required by the new Ecumenical Church guidelines.

== Personal life ==
By the 2010s, Mañosa was a retired but decorated architect. His three children all work for the family company, Mañosa & Company. Isabel ("Bambi"), the eldest and only daughter, is the head of the interior design department, as well as a director of Tukod Foundation, a foundation of the Mañosa Group which advocates the advancement of Filipino design, art and aesthetics. Francisco Jr. ("Dino") acts as CEO of the entire Mañosa Group, and is the founder and CEO of Mañosa Properties. Francisco's youngest son, Angelo ("Gelo"), carries on his father's architectural legacy as the CEO of Mañosa & Company.

While not working on his projects for the company, Mañosa was also part of the jazz band The Executive Band. He played piano for the band.

In 2012, Mañosa fell and cracked two vertebrae which had to be fused in order to heal. He also needed heart bypass surgery in order to repair a life-threatening ventricular blockage.

== Death ==
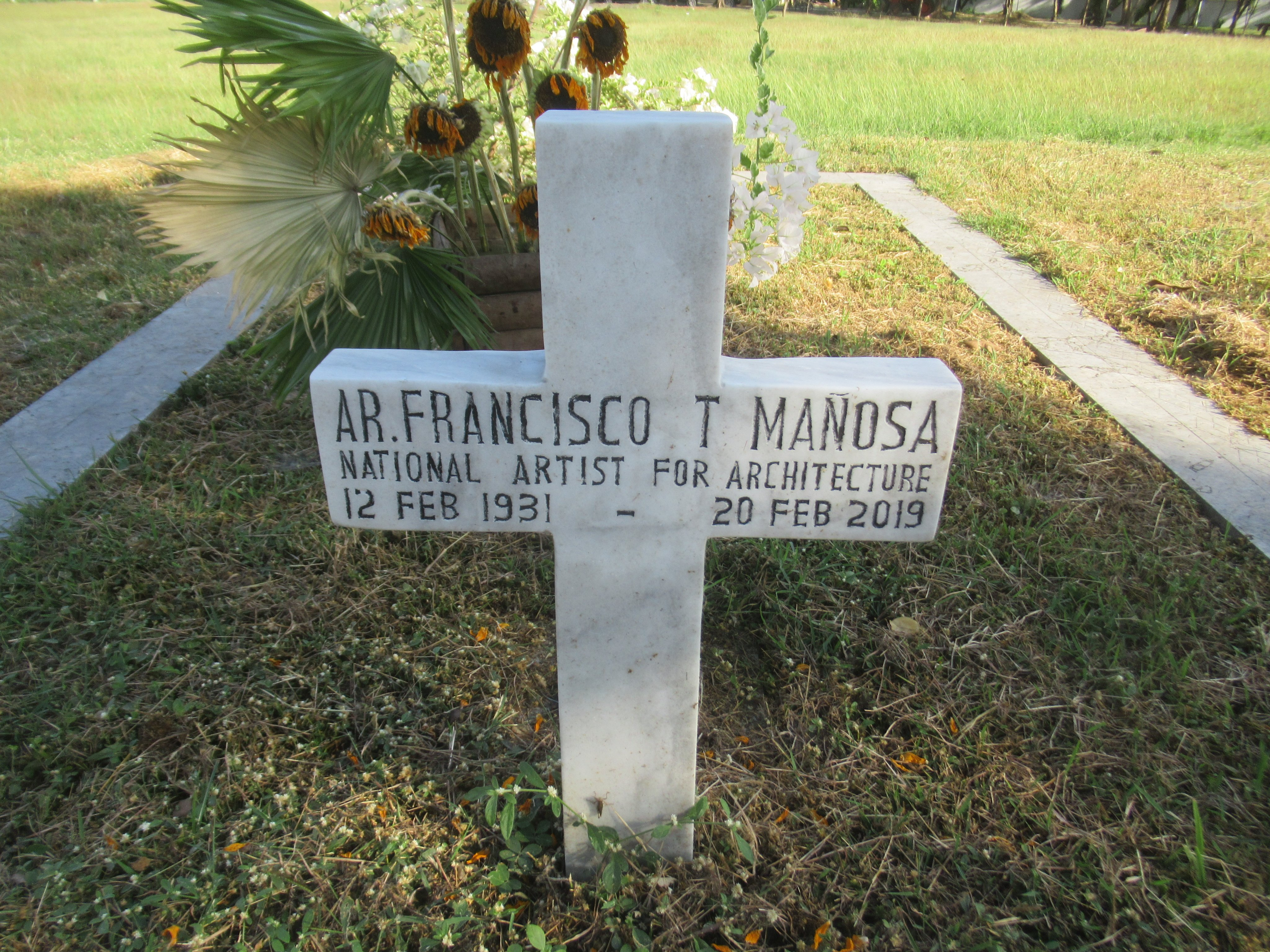
Mañosa's grave at the Libingan ng mga Bayani.

Mañosa died on February 20, 2019. He was 88. Mañosa's remains received full state honors when laid to rest at the Libingan ng mga Bayani.

== Works ==
=== Churches ===
- Mary Immaculate Parish (Nature's Church)
- Assumption College Chapel
- Quadricentennial Altar
- Risen Lord Parish Church
- Shrine of Mary, Queen of Peace, Our Lady of EDSA
- St. Joseph Church (Las Pinas)
- World Youth Day Papal Altar
- Mary, Mother of God Parish (Muntinlupa)

=== Residential ===
- Mañosa Residence (Ayala Alabang)
- Arnaiz Residence
- Cahaya "The Sanctuary"
- Diego Cerra Homes
- Floirendo Residence
- Hoffmann Residence
- Hofileña Residence
- Pabahay - Bayanihan
- Pabahay -PNP
- Valenciano Residence
- The Astley Residence - Timberland Heights

=== Commercial ===
- Eagle Ridge Building
- JMT Corporate Center
- The New Medical City (built in 2002)
- Nielson Towers (Makati)
- Saztec Building
- Sulo Restaurant (now demolished & now currently replaced by UCC Cafe Philippines)

=== Institutional ===
- Aquino Center
- Ateneo Education Building
- Ateneo Professional Schools
- Bamboo Mansion
- Centro Escolar University
- Coconut Palace
- Corregidor Island War Memorial
- Environmental Research Center
- Elsie Gatches Village
- Food Terminal Inc.
- Lanao del Norte Provincial Capitol
- Learning Child
- Philippine Friendship Pavilion
- St. Andrew's School (Parañaque)

=== Other ===
- Manila Light Rail Transit 1 stations (from Baclaran to Moumento Stations)
- 2019 Southeast Asian Games cauldron (Manosa's final project)
