= Virginia Ty-Navarro =

Virginia Ty-Navarro (5 July 1922 – 28 January 1996) was a Filipina sculptor and painter, best known nationwide for her 1989 sculpture "Statue of Our Lady Queen of Peace", which she completed in sixteen months on a ₱12 million budget. The sculpture is alternatively called "Our Lady of EDSA Shrine" and is located atop the church of the same name in Ortigas.

Ty-Navarro was born on 5 July 1922. In her youth, she began with tutoring from a Chinese artist and later a German nun as she was at St. Scholastica’s College. She then took a course in Fine Arts at the University of Santo Tomas where she studied under National Artist Carlos “Botong” Francisco and National Artist Victorio C. Edades, during the Japanese occupation of the Philippines.

She later taught at her alma mater of the University of Santo Tomas and the former College of the Holy Spirit. She worked primarily with metals, such as bronze. and followed a modernist style in her art, particularly the technique of "incision painting". Some of her works are currently displayed in Manila at the National Museum of Fine Arts.

Ty-Navarro was married to National Artist Jerry Navarro Elizalde. She died from Alzheimer's disease in Manila on 28 January 1996, at the age of 71.

== Exhibits and works ==
- Women in Art 2008: Oil Painting and Metal Sculpture

== See also ==
- Jerry Elizalde Navarro (in Dutch)
