= 2015 Iglesia ni Cristo protests =

Marches in the Philippines

The 2015 INC protests were a series of marches which occurred between August 27–31, 2015. Supporters of the Iglesia ni Cristo, a religious body led by executive minister Eduardo V. Manalo, protested against the Department of Justice for allegedly meddling in internal church affairs by taking action on an illegal detention case filed by expelled minister Isaias Samson, Jr. Samson alleged that he was illegally detained by the church and has accused the church of corruption.

== Timeline ==
=== August 27 ===
About 2,000 Iglesia Ni Cristo members led by its spokesperson, Edwil Zabala organized a vigil outside the office of the Department of Justice along Padre Faura Street in Manila. The demonstrators protested against the government agency, led by De Lima, for allegedly persecuting their church and called for upholding the separation of church and state. They also called for the agency to prioritize more important issues. The start of the protests was inline with De Lima's 56th birthday and the justice secretary hinting of her intention to run as senator in the 2016 Philippine elections saying that she was 80 percent sure of pursuing a senatorial campaign.

=== August 28 ===
The protests continued near the Department of Justice office but the demonstrators later moved to Epifanio De los Santos Avenue or EDSA in the evening. At 6:00 pm the National Capital Region Police Office went full-alert. Task Force Manila Shield was activated. At 8:30pm protestors started to gather outside the SM Megamall Fashion Hall in Mandaluyong and the EDSA Shrine in Quezon City, a few hundred meters away, before marching to Shaw Boulevard. By 9:30pm, both the southbound and northbound lanes of EDSA in front of Robinsons Galleria were filled with protestors, leaving only the EDSA-Ortigas flyover passable and leaving motorists stranded for over four hours. Margarita “Tingting” Cojuangco, and Council of Philippine Affairs (Copa) head Pastor Boy Saycon were also reported to have joined the protests by 11:30pm.

The protesters shouted in unison, "Hustisya" or Justice in Filipino but later switched and shouted “hostess siya, De Lima.” (She's a hostess, De Lima). "Hostess" in Philippine colloquialism means prostitute. When an ambulance passed by near the protest site, some protesters called for putting De Lima inside the passing vehicle. “Leila, Leila Labandera” was also chanted by the demonstrators to the tune of The Battle Hymn of the Republic and they yelled “pabebe, De Lima!” when a Higantes-themed effigy of De Lima was brought to the protest site.

One of the hosts of the protests alleged that De Lima's alleged giving priority to the illegal detention case by Samson was related to her plans for the 2016 elections. In response to De Lima's reaction that she was just doing her job, the host said that the job of the secretary "was not to listen to hearsays" and that De Lima must focus on more important issues such as the case of the SAF 44.

About 5,000 was estimated to have taken part in the August 28 protest as estimated by the police.

=== August 29 ===
Former Tarlac Governor, Margarita “Tingting” Cojuangco spoke before the Iglesia Ni Cristo protesters at EDSA-Shaw corner at evening of August 29. She called for justice of the SAF 44 who were killed in the Mamasapano clash and called for the police officers which were asked to secure the site of the protests to join her on stage. INC spokesperson Zabala apologised for the heavy traffic caused by the protests, and reminded protesters that the media were not their enemy after an ABS-CBN cameraman was reported to have been attacked on August 28. The Mandaluyong government had given them a permit to protest until August 30 which could be extended.

=== August 30 ===
Protests continues in EDSA as parts of the avenue were rendered impassible. The number of protesters swelled to around 15,400 according to police reports. The Mandaluyong city government's permit to the protesters only allowed the protesters to gather at a designated 1,200-sq.m. area at EDSA-Shaw. It was reported that some protesters occupied the portion near the EDSA Shrine in Quezon City. It was also reported that as early as August 29, Iglesia Ni Cristo members from other parts of Luzon were converging in Metro Manila for the protests. Similar protests in Cebu, Puerto Princesa, and Davao starting on evening of August 30 were also planned.

=== August 31 ===
Through the INC-ran television channel NET 25, General Evangelist Bienvenido Santiago announced the end of the protests after he said that the church and government officials held talks and made clarifications to their respective sides. Palace spokesperson Abigail Valte, clarified that there was no deal struck between the government and the church. Planned demonstrations in Cebu were cancelled. Some protesters were already gathered at the INC house of worship along Gen. Maxilom Avenue when the cancellation of protest were announced. It was planned that they would head toward Plaza Independencia to stage a vigil.

== Political Analysis ==
Ramon Casiple, executive director of the Institute for Political and Electoral Reforms, based in Manila, described the protests' goal as to pressure the government to back out from taking action on the filed illegal detention case. Casiple added that the government was unlikely to yield and stop the legal process. He added that "The one on trial here is the Iglesia ni Cristo. They have to show their unity... their strength,"

== Reactions ==
=== Relevant parties ===
==== Isaias Samson Jr. ====
Samson's lawyer, Trixie Cruz-Angeles, speaking on his behalf said that “The Sanggunian, the people who we filed charges against are running scared, they are very, very afraid,”. Cruz-Angeles alleges that the church leadership are using the protesters as human shields. "First they thought Ka Jun (Samson) would not put his money where his mouth is, so to speak, that he was afraid. They thought they had neutralized him. But with his coming out and filing cases, these are only the first cases. There are more. And they know that,” she added referring to the Samson's camp opinion on the Sanggunian.

=== Others ===
==== Individual Politicians ====
Vice President Jejomar Binay said in a statement on August 29 that the Iglesia ni Cristo was only practicing its freedom to assembly and religious freedom. He also criticized the current administration. “We cannot fault the INC for resorting to mass action to protect the independence of their church from a clear act of harassment and interference from the administration,” Binay said. He called for the justice of SAF 44 which he believes that the DOJ must prioritize.

Senator Grace Poe said that she respects the protesters. “For me, those people are defending their faith. We respect that and they also have to protect their rights,” Poe said. She also called for the government to clarify the actions taken to the Iglesia ni Cristo and noted that the DOJ is already handling many cases when asked if the DOJ should handle the illegal detention case. “The INC certainly has the right to stage a peaceful mass action to express their sentiments in defense of their faith,”. Senator Francis Escudero had a similar opinion to Poe and added that the DOJ must respect the separation of church and state.

Senator Bongbong Marcos said in support to the Iglesia ni Cristo. He said that the DOJ's investigation must be both transparent and impartial.

Senator Miriam Defensor Santiago express the support to Iglesia ni Cristo. She said “The envelope has been pushed too far. As a matter of faith, they (members of the INC) want a regime change, even only in attitude, among our present corrupt politicians”.

However, Davao City mayor Rodrigo Duterte said that he will allow members of Iglesia ni Cristo to hold a rally in front of the city's Hall of Justice as long as they do not keep the public out.

==== Catholic Church ====
The Catholic Bishops' Conference of the Philippines issued a statement to Catholics said "The EDSA Shrine is a Catholic center of worship. It is a church. There is a Catholic priest assigned to it. We ask that all respect the sacred character of the EDSA Shrine," and added that "Unless it is convincingly shown that a law offends moral precepts, obedience to the law is a Christian duty. Sons and daughters of the Church cannot be less observant of the law than other citizens of the Republic,"

==== Commission on Human Rights ====
The chairman of the Commission on Human Rights, Chito Gascon, in a text message to the media said that he disagrees with the belief held by the protesters that the DOJ violated the separation of church and state. “separation of Church and State does not arise at all in this instance. This is a matter involving the proper exercise of powers by the Justice department, involving an investigation of a case that may involve violation of law that exempts no one.” Gascon explains. He added that the separation of church and state only ensures that “the State does not favour any particular religion” and that “every person is able to believe and practice faith.”

Gascon further added that “On matters of criminal law, the justice system must be allowed to take its due course no matter who may be the perpetrators involved, otherwise, people will ultimately be taking the law or interpretation thereof upon themselves, which would undermine it,” and that the “rule of law” must be secured to ensure human rights.“ No person or institution under our constitutional system can place themselves above or beyond the reach of law,” he added.

==== Other figures ====
Former Akbayan partylist representative, Walden Bello, expressed support to the move of the DOJ to handle the illegal detention case filed by Samson, and condemned politicians who expressed sympathy to the protesters. He also termed the protest as "disruption" of Metro Manila and views it as unacceptable. “If a Roman Catholic priest is accused of sexual exploitation of minors, he would be subject to secular prosecution by the state and would never be allowed to invoke the separation of church and state principle to protect him from prosecution,” Bello reasoned.

==== Social media ====
Supporters of De Lima and critics of the protests by Iglesia ni Cristo members made the hashtag #DeLimaBringtheTruth trending with about 138,000 tweets as of evening of August 29. Supporters of the Iglesia ni Cristo also came up with their own hashtags: #IglesianiCristo (19,600 tweets)

On Facebook as well as Twitter, netizens expressed displeasure over the actions of the INC members, taking them to task for rallying without permits and for disrupting the flow of traffic. Because the protests were held on a payday that preceded a long holiday weekend, commuters were inconvenienced by trips that took far longer than their usual duration. This was compounded by the mall-wide sales scheduled for that weekend by both Robinson's Galleria and SM Megamall, which further contributed to the traffic jam. When INC members protesting in the streets were interviewed live on why they were protesting, statements such as 'our loved minister told us to' resonated - leading to public opinion branding INC as a cult. Public hatred towards the Iglesia ni Cristo rose because of the event.
