= Jerry Navarro Elizalde =

Filipino artist (1924–1999)

Jerry Elizalde Navarro
- Born: 22 May 1924; San Jose, Antique, Philippine Islands
- Died: 10 June 1999 (aged 75)
- Occupation: Artist
- Spouse: Virginia Ty-Navarro
- Parents: Emiliano Navarro (father); Paz Elizalde (mother)
- Relatives: Pedro Bernal Elizalde (uncle)
- Awards: Order of National Artists of the Philippines

Jeremias "Jerry" Elizalde Navarro (22 May 1924 – 10 June 1999) was a Filipino artist. He was later named a National Artist.

== Early life and education ==
As a young artist, Navarro was passionate about creating new art forms. He experimented with different kinds of art media such as oil, acrylic, and watercolor. He also tried making sculptures and mixed media compositions. He used the "incision painting" method. "Incision painting" involves applying paint on a stop surface by carving out a desired pattern on stone materials and layering paint or plaster on the stone surface.

He studied at the University of the Philippines, Manila as a Ramon Roces Publication Scholar in 1947. The following year he transferred to the University of Santo Tomas, where he studied fine arts and majored in painting. He graduated with a Bachelor of Arts in 1951. While studying at the University of Santo Tomas, he was an art editor for the university newspaper, The Varsitarian.

== Personal life ==
His wife was sculptor Virginia Ty-Navarro.

== Exhibits and works ==
- 1967 – represented the Philippines in Sculpture Category, São Paulo Beinnale Brazil
- 1970 – represented the Philippines in Sculpture Category, São Paulo Beinnale, Brazil
- 1972 – represented the Philippines at the Biennale de art Graphiques, Brno, Czechoslovakia
- 1977 – designed the Philippine booth, 12th Tokyo International Trade Fair Japan
- 1977 – designed the ASEAN Trade Fair, Manila, Philippines
- 1980 – First Filipino artist to be represented at YAYASAN Bali, Indonesia
- 2014 – Leon Art Gallery Auction House "The Kingly Treasures"

== See also ==
- Virginia Ty-Navarro
