= List of Pinoy Big Brother: Kumunity Season 10 episodes =

The following are the summary of the episodes of Pinoy Big Brother: Kumunity Season 10 which began airing on Kapamilya Channel, Jeepney TV and A2Z on October 16, 2021.

The show had already broadcast 225 episodes during the season's entire run.

== Celebrity ==
Note that Day 1 started on October 16 upon the entry of the celebrity housemates. Note also that the events in the House, as broadcast in the show, does not truly reflect the exact day when these events had really transpired as the show had based them on the episode counts. All the days mentioned in these summary are based on the live feed of the show via Kumu and not from the said episode count of the show.

=== Week 1 ===
Episode No(s).	Title	Timeline	Original air date(s)
1	"Big Kumunity Party"	Day 1	October 16, 2021
As Toni was to open the season, the show opened with a performance from Agsunta and Kritiko as they perform their rendition of "Sikat Ang Pinoy", the theme song of the celebrity edition, with appearances from Connect Big Four Jie-Ann Armero, Kobie Brown, Andi Abaya, and Liofer Pinatacan. In chronological order of introduction, Madam Inutz, Brenda, TJ, Anji, KD, Shanaia, Samantha, Eian, Alexa, John, Alyssa, and Karen were individually introduced by Toni, Bianca, Robi, and Kim. And prior to their entry, each housemate was given with an ambag (Tagalog: contribution) bag which they must bring inside the House. To their surprise, they were greeted with a nearly empty House: there were no cooking equipment, bed mattresses and pillows, tables, furniture, appliances, and all other things usually used inside the House, with the exception of the plasma TV and a glass container placed at the living area. Later on, as tasked by Toni, they poured the contents of the bags into the glass container. The bag was revealed to contain the Big Coins that were involved with their pre-entry ambagan task. From there, Toni reveal that they collectively accumulated the amount of 6,190 Big Coins after earning a total of 61,900,000 Kumu diamonds (10,000 Kumu diamonds is equal to 1 Big Coins), and will be used on their first task that was given to the group of Madam Inutz, Brenda, and TJ. They were then instructed to go to the activity area in predetermined trios to take part in the task. Each trio selected an envelope to determine which human container they will wear while shopping for the items. They were then given 100 seconds to choose and purchase the items they wish. The group of Madam Inutz, Brenda, and TJ started buying needed appliances using a shopping cart for the house in 100 seconds, and they spent 2,300 Big Coins at checkout, therefore having 3,890 Big Coins as remaining balance. Just after the hosts publicly introduced the first twelve housemates, Bianca surprised Kyle, who was on hotel quarantine and holding a Kumu livestream, by announcing that he is a celebrity housemate and will enter the house in the coming days. At the end of the episode, it was revealed that four more housemates will enter the House: Albie, Chie, and the two Online Bahay ni Kuya Kumu campaign winners Jordan and Benedix. The outcome of their first task ended in a cliffhanger.
2	"1st Night"	Day 1	October 17, 2021
The episode started with the review of the entry of all the 12 housemates, and of their shopping task where, starting from where the live episode left off, the group of Anji, KD, and Shanaia continued shopping using a human eco bag and spent 875 Big Coins, the group of Samantha, Eian, and Alexa using a human shopping basket and spent 1,875 Big Coins at checkout, and the group of John, Alyssa, and Karen using a human eco bag and spent 675 Big Coins. After all the shopping, the housemates have spent a total of 5,675 Big Coins, with 515 Big Coins being saved. Following the task, the housemates brought the furniture that they had purchased to the house, and placed them at their designated areas. TJ was given an album displaying how the furniture should be arranged. After their shopping task, the housemates were called one by one and officially had their first encounter with Big Brother, and KD volunteered to see him first followed by the rest. Afterwards, the housemates were instructed to get the fishes and food from the storage room for their welcome feast. After the feast, the housemates got themselves changed and prepared to sleep.
3	"Kumunity Pantry"	Days 1-2	October 18, 2021
In their first night, John shared that he brought with him a onesie. A day after, they were awaken by their first wake up call. Later on, the housemates discovered that the food that they had saved from the welcome feast last night were taken back by Big Brother. Since the housemates had no food supplies, for the first Kumunity Decides task, Alyssa was tasked to get their food supplies for that day in a community pantry (dubbed as the Kumunity pantry) and cook for the housemates for the entire day. Alyssa also asked Anji for help with her task. The two were told only to get enough food supplies for that day. They later continued in preparing for their breakfast. Afterwards, they then shared the meals with the other housemates. While in the Kumunity Pantry, Alyssa and Anji were able to get a package of important items and letters addressed to Madam Inutz and the two of them. The three of them were later instructed to read and share the letters with the other housemates in the living area where they emotionally read out and shared to the housemates their respective stories.
4	"Pa Mine"	Day 2	October 19, 2021
Madam Inutz was called by Big Brother and was asked about her life and experiences, especially with her family's struggle in caring for her ailing mother. She also shared in how she had started her online selling business and her career as "Madam Inutz." Later on, Madam Inutz and Brenda were informed of their first weekly task. Called Pa-Mine Pa More, the housemates were tasked to sell clothing items online via Kumu for three hours per day. The two later on informed the housemates of their said task. Having no experience with online selling, the housemates decided to practice the said job. After their practice, at the living area, the housemates decided to sort all their items they were about to sell. While sorting their items, tension rose after Madam Inutz and Brenda had a misunderstanding with sorting the specific kind of clothing, and making a price for an item. The two were able to reconcile afterwards. Meanwhile, KD was able to retrieve his guitar from Big Brother, enabling the housemates to unwind through music. With that, KD and Anji played their take on Moira Dela Torre's "Paubaya," while Eian and Brenda made a "music video" interpretation of the song.
5	"Wifi Task"	Day 2-3	October 20, 2021
The housemates start their first weekly task as a batch. Before starting their live selling task, the housemates must fill the water container (with the Wi-Fi logo) by passing a filled water bucket using their legs. If the water container is filled, they will gain Wi-Fi signal for their giant cellphone to use in their live selling task. Even before the start of their task, conflict emerged between Brenda and John. In the end, they weren't able to fill up the water container, and Big Brother give them one hour for them to use the House's Wi-Fi signal to do their online selling. From there, task leaders Brenda and Madam Inutz, accompanying Eian, started doing their online selling, with some housemates observing the activity from afar. After their first online selling session, Alexa and Brenda received packages of important items and letters for each of them. Before heading to bed, Brenda and John with the help of TJ resolved the conflict they have earlier, exchanged apologies, and reconcile with each other.
6	"Support Kita"	Day 4	October 21, 2021
Since the first day inside the house, KD have been noticeably quiet and has a hard time socializing with new people. Just because they see each other at projects, KD usually goes near and interacts with Anji. Days pass by, KD is always seen away from the housemates. As resident psychologist Dr. Randy Dellosa explains, KD is a self-diagnosed introvert who prefers to recharge his physical and mental energies by being alone and not be with the housemates. Just like the other housemates who did this earlier, TJ, John, and KD received packages and letters from the outside world. TJ received a promise ring from his girlfriend and reads his letter from her, and John receives a baby onesie and a picture of his baby from his fiancé and reads his letter from his baby. KD received his high school diploma, and reads out his letter from his family. As he reads out his message, KD opened up emotionally to the housemates his difficulty with online schooling, having an anxiety attack, and how it strained his relationship with his parents. The housemates showed sympathy for and went near an emotional KD; and after reading his letter, he went out of the house and stayed alone in the garden area. As Doc Randy adds, the housemates should respect his need for isolation and rest rather than pressuring him to open up and be with people. Later, KD went to the confession room where he would continue sharing his story with Big Brother, including a time he stopped schooling, thought of returning to school, and promised to make his parents proud and become a music producer. Big Brother reminded KD not to underestimate his ordeals, tells him that mental health is important at this moment, and reminds him that he is not alone and that the housemates are one with him. Because he walked out from the housemates earlier, he heard Big Brother's observations on what happened, KD planned to apologize to the housemates. From the confession room, the housemates prepared a mini surprise to cheer KD. After mealtime, a concerned Samantha talks to KD in the kitchen, KD came to TJ to say sorry in the boys bedroom, and Brenda got to interact with KD in the living room. TJ and Samantha were called to the confession room to talk about KD, where Samantha shared she sees her own brother in KD. Later, Anji was called to the confession room to talk about KD, admitted that she felt bad for not reaching out to KD out of fears of judgment by the online world. From there, an emotional Anji comes to KD to apologize for avoiding him in the past few days. On Day 5, Kyle first entered the House where he, as he interacts with Big Brother, would be given tasks to do: he would get food supply from the Kumunity pantry, be tasked to cook, and will be the human speaker where he can speak without the housemates identifying him. Chie did enter the house the same day as Kyle, but would be featured in succeeding episodes.
7	"Rap It Up"	Day 5	October 22, 2021
The episode starts with the housemates getting up from their beds. As KD, John, and TJ head to the pool area, they notice a giant speaker covering the activity area entrance where Kyle was staying inside for the time being. Much to the surprise of the other housemates, they interacted with the speaker and received their daily food supplies that, unknowingly, was selected by Kyle himself earlier that day. After getting their food supplies, the housemates return to the House to prepare their meals, but Brenda and some few others returned to the giant speaker to interact with and entertain Kyle from inside, even with KD and Anji serenading the giant speaker with a song. Later, Big Brother gave Alyssa and Madam Inutz a task so that the housemates may get to know who is inside the giant speaker. Thus, with the help of John, KD, and TJ, they're going to dress up as rappers and perform a song with rap together with Kyle. (The song used being their edition's theme song "Sikat ang Pinoy.") They were successful, Kyle exits the giant speaker, and was introduced as the new celebrity housemate. Before the episode ends, Toni shared details on the upcoming Head of Household challenge. While inside the confession room, Chie entered the house, was welcomed by Big Brother, and shares about her life and experiences before entering the house, including the fact she became a calendar girl. Then, Big Brother gives Chie her first task before finally meeting the housemates and starting their pool party.
8	"Pa-Mine Kuya"	Days 5-7	October 23, 2021
Continuing with the events of Day 5 was Chie's entry to the Big Brother house, and the start of her task. As the other housemates were in the living room, Chie took her seat at the lifeguard tower, chained and locked. The housemates were shocked to see Chie there, and they got to interact with her for a while before the task was given. With the help of the other housemates, Chie has to figure out the three-digit combination code to break free from the lifeguard tower, with every digit being based on the number of birth months that the male housemates, female housemates, and all housemates combined have. Because the housemates cannot give their birth months directly, each housemate has to swim from the tower to the bottom of the pool where they have to place six orange blocks or pamato for the boys and seven yellow blocks for the girls. The housemates have completed their part, Chie manages to figure out the code, loosen the chain, and leaves the lifeguard tower. From there, Big Brother welcomed Chie as their newest housemate, and started their pool party. After the pool party, Big Brother informs the housemates that Kyle and Chie, just like the first twelve housemates who entered, also had their pre-entry ambagan tasks and earned the amount of 4,431.2 Big Coins, added the 515 Big Coins balance from the first night, and 4,946.2 Big Coins was accumulated where they are going to use that amount to purchase more furniture for the house. On the morning of Dax 6, Chie, Shanaia, Samantha, Karen, and Kyle received packages of important items and letters for each of them. The housemates continued with their weekly task; after their live selling session, a particular item was left inside the house, causing another conflict between Brenda and John. On Day 7, the housemates continued with the final round of their live selling. Later, Big Brother announced that the housemates had succeeded in their first weekly task. For the second week, the housemates battled for their first Head of Household challenge on Day 8 and was won by Brenda.

=== Week 2 ===
Episode No(s).	Title	Timeline	Original air date(s)
9	"Party"	Days 8	October 24, 2021
For winning their first weekly task, Big Brother informed task leaders Brenda and Madam Inutz that the proceeds amounting to twenty-one thousand seven hundred forty pesos (PhP 21,740.00) may be given to either their families, or to a charity of their choice. That is to be decided by the housemates, and they decided to give the proceeds to charity. With this, Samantha, John and Karen gave each of their suggestions that were based on their personal advocacies, but the housemates ultimately went with Karen's suggestion (the BJMP women's facility where she was previously incarcerated). That afternoon, Chie and Kyle were called by Big Brother to organize their celebrity ambag party, and were assigned as the event's hosts. Later, groups of three housemates were separately informed of their role for the ambagan party: a task where one of them wears a mouthguard and gives directions to two blindfolded housemates standing from each end of the activity area where they have to find and get their ambag for the party. The group of Eian, Alexa, and Brenda were able to get food for the party; the group of Karen, John, and Shanaia with party decorations; the group of Anji, Samantha, and TJ with dessert; and the group of Madam Inutz, Alyssa, and KD with drinks. That evening, the housemates have their celebrity ambagan party where they have their dinner and some parlor games. Later, Big Brother gave the housemates a fun challenge where, as drinks were presented to them, each housemate has to choose only one and drink from any of the shot glasses filled with either whiskey or a mixture of water and fish sauce (patis). With KD and Anji not participating, TJ, John, Alyssa, Chie, Shanaia, Karen, and Madam Inutz were able to drink whiskey, while Brenda, Samantha, Kyle, and Alexa drank the water and patis mixture. After the fun challenge, the housemates were serenaded with an original composition from Kyle and KD while having their slow dance. After their party, Brenda, Samantha, Kyle, and Alexa went to the confession room with Eian, and had a chat with Big Brother where they were told to bring shot glasses with whiskey to the house and propose a toast honoring their time with the housemates. Later, Madam Inutz went to the confession room, and makes a request to Big Brother to give her more whiskey to drink. From there, Big Brother gave her three shot glasses, two with whiskey and one with the water and patis mixture, to which she enjoyed with Big Brother. NOTE: In the television broadcast, Eian's scene where he drinks either the whiskey or the mixture was not presented; however, it was shown in the show's Kumu live stream where he did drink whiskey.
10-13	"Immunity Battle," "Takot Ako," "2nd Weekly Task," and "Madam Tiyanak"	Days 9-11	October 25-28, 2021
On Day 9, after winning the ambagan live streaming tasks, the group of Eian, Brenda and Alexa were given special powers that were given at random; these powers were only revealed to them after they chose one of three stars prepared by Big Brother. Eian randomly selected the power to contact someone from the outside world; Brenda randomly selected the power to save any housemate from being nominated, including herself; and Alexa was left with the power to nominate a housemate. This was announced before the housemates were given their second weekly task (however, this twist was only revealed to the viewers on Day 16). Later that day, Big Brother gave their second weekly task. TJ was assigned as the task leader; while Kyle was chosen as the assistant leader by the public via Kumunity Decides. As part of the Halloween theme in the house, the three youngest housemates (Anji, Kyle and Shanaia) were "sacrificed" to the Confession Room. It was revealed the three, apart from being task leaders, will be the producers of the play. Later on, the three selected people to have a role in the production of the play.
14	"Mr. Ben"	Day 12	October 29, 2021
On Day 12, Albie entered the House and got to interact with Big Brother. As the housemates continued making the props for their stage play, Albie was given a secret task: with the use of a doll Big Brother provided whom Albie named that as "Ben," he must tap a housemate as his accomplice and pretend to have owned that doll as a child. As tasks will be given at this time, however, the housemate-accomplice would only be able to hear his voice being altered to sound creepy. From the confession room, Albie brings Ben and places him under the balete tree in the Kumu room, and heads to the task room to start his mission. Samantha was called by Big Brother to get the items under the balete tree: more materials and Ben which caught her off guard. She got scared after hearing and interacting with Ben with a creepy voice. As she returns to the house and as part of her task with Albie, the housemates were surprised and curious with what Samantha brought as she convinces them she owns Ben "since childhood." Given her fear for dolls (pediophobia), Anji has been fearful of seeing Ben, giving Albie a hilariously hard time completing the task with Samantha. For his second task, Albie was tasked to introduce Ben to Anji with Samantha's help. This caused Anji to cry in fear, even when Samantha brought her to the girls bedroom alone. Big Brother then called Anji to the confession where, after venting out her irritability of Ben and Big Brother explaining the doll's presence, Anji asks for more materials as reward for facing her pediophobic fears. After meeting and talking to Samantha again in the girls bedroom, Anji successfully overcome her fears, and the two were called by Big Brother to talk about the happening. Moments later, as Albie's final task, Samantha has to say goodbye to Ben, and give a beautiful eulogy as Ben is to be buried near the balete. Before that, Anji and some of the housemates bid farewell to Ben, and Samantha brought Ben to be buried by the balete and gave her eulogy. As she turns away, Albie emerged from the balete tree to surprise Samantha, and interacted with each other in the flesh. NOTE: With Albie's delayed entry who entered on Day 12, he is exempt from the nomination proceedings that will occur four days later on Day 16.
15	"Takot Live Musical"	Days 12-15	October 30, 2021
The episode started with highlights from Episode 14. After secretly and successfully completing the task, Samantha surprised the other housemates as Albie makes his entrance to the outdoor area, much to the surprise, shock, and excitement of Chie, Kyle, and Alexa who he had previously worked with in the then-recently concluded drama series Init sa Magdamag. Right after, Alexa and Chie separately helped Albie in doing the dance to catch up with their remaining time for practice. Ahead of the day of their performance, Big Brother informed the housemates that the roles of sirena and kapre, which is to be chosen by Kumu users or the Kumunity, will be revealed on the day of the performance itself. That announcement brought both shock and dismay to the housemates. On Day 15, Toni announced that Kyle and Alexa were both chosen to portray the roles of kapre and sirena respectively. After their performance, Big Brother announced that the housemates were able to succeed in their second weekly task. Before the episode concludes, Toni announced that the first nomination for the Celebrity Edition will be held the next day.

=== Week 3 ===
Episode No(s).	Title	Timeline	Original air date(s)
16	"1st Nomination,"	Days 15-16	October 31, 2021
The episode started with the events after the Takot ang Pinoy musical where they were successful. The next day, on Day 16, the housemates had their first round of nominations. Alexa and Brenda had refused to use the powers given to them prior to the nominations, leaving the list of nominees intact; while Albie is exempt from nomination being a late entrant to the house. John, KD and Karen were revealed as the set of nominees for that week. Before the end of the episode, former Lucky 7 housemates McCoy de Leon and Elisse Joson returned to the house and catch up with Big Brother. There, they were asking Big Brother to be their godfather to their daughter, to which Big Brother gladly accepted the offer. As a gift, Big Brother presented to McCoy and Elisse with t-shirts bearing the words "Pinoy Big Father," "Pinoy Big Mother," and "Pinoy Big Daughter" all donned up in the logo of their edition; and Big Brother gave advice to and congratulated McCoy and Elisse.
17	"Special Friend"	Days 12-17	November 1, 2021
On Day 17, based on their conscience and of their honesty, the housemates were asked to choose between "with no violation" or "with violation" placards. All of them chose the "with violation" placard. They were instructed to pack their personal and other essential things within 100 seconds; thereafter, they were then further instructed to move to the activity area and stay there until otherwise instructed. Unknown to them, Benedix, the new housemate, was instructed to become as their punishment officer.
18	"Violations"	Day 17	November 2, 2021
19	"Pinuno"	Day 17	November 3, 2021
In the days past, Karen shared about her previous life in prison with some of the housemates, which earned praise by some of their housemates; and because the housemates have to live in the punishment area for their violations committed, Karen cannot help but emotionally reminisce life in jail again. In a special confession room (inside the Kumu room), Karen emotionally shares to Big Brother the events that brought her to jail, the questions she raised during her time there, and how it affected her family. From there, Big Brother admired Karen's courage, and reminded her that, through their punishment, "the whole world would see" how she "can be the light in the middle of the dark."
20	"Abswelto"	TBA	November 4, 2021
As the girls continued to create wooden blocks as part of their task, TJ and some girl housemates noticed how Alexa is doing, which eventually led her to return to the house exhausted. Thus, Benedix and Alyssa helped bring Alexa to Big Brother's care to be checked. Moments later, the two brought Alexa to the girls bedroom to rest per medic's advice. If Alexa was brought back to rest, KD was being checked after experiencing a bad feeling, and was also advised to take a rest inside the house. Meanwhile, the girls have finished making 193 wooden blocks, and Karen and Anji conversed in the pool area. Punishment Officer Benedix received word from Big Brother that, given their special need, Alexa and KD will not return to the punishment area. Another task was given where, after seeking advice from Karen and TJ, P.O. Benedix gives four brown envelopes to Alyssa, Shanaia, Eian, and Kyle where they received a paper saying "ABSWELTO" (English: Absolved), meaning they are released from the punishment area and can return to the house.
21	"Albie There For You"	TBA	November 5, 2021
After few days in the punishment area, the housemates have completed their sentence and were release, but Punishment Officer Benedix has to return to the punishment area. As the housemates have returned to the house, Benedix has just resigned as their punishment officer and, later, was given a warm welcome being their new housemate. As the housemates welcomed Benedix, Albie was noticeably alone. By lunch time, Albie did not join them for meal and stayed in the boys bedroom alone.
22	"1st Eviction Night"	Days 22	November 6, 2021
After moments of no communication, Albie and Alexa got to talk to and forgive each other, much to the gladness of TJ and the two involved. John and KD were assigned for their weekly task, called Tumba Table, the housemates have to place 170 wooden blocks on a hanging but unstable table one at a time. Meanwhile, a secret task was given to John where he, along with Brenda, KD, Kyle, and Madam Inutz, must practice the weekly task by placing 35 wooden blocks at a time on the table, seven for each housemate with seven representing the seven years of John's relationship with his fiancé. After completing the secret task, John received his reward: a video recorded message from his fiancé and their baby son, making John tear up. The housemates continued with their weekly task and, after one hour, they were not able to finish the task. In the end, they failed in their weekly task. With the live eviction proceeding held on Day 22, the first for this season, John is evicted from the house, saving KD and Karen from eviction.

=== Week 4 ===
Episode No(s).	Title	Timeline	Original air date(s)
23-24	"2nd Nomination," "I Feel You"	Days 23-24	November 7-8, 2021
On Day 23, the following day, TJ won the Head of Household challenge, granting him immunity for the week's nomination process. Later that day Madam Inutz won a Nomination Immunity Pass for winning the Follower Sprint Task. Albie, Anji, KD and Alexa were then revealed to be in the set of nominees for that week. Alexa and Brenda chose not to use their powers leaving the set of nominees as is. On Day 24, Alyssa was given a secret task to cook for Samantha as a surprise for her birthday; she was tasked to cook the dishes usually prepared by Samantha's mom.
25	"Hanggang Dito Lang"	Day 25	November 9, 2021
This episode focuses on KD and Anji and the hidden story of their closeness outside the house. As Bianca narrates, the two seemed to feel awkward of each other inside at first, but Anji tried to get close to KD as he opened up about his thoughts having anxiety. Days later, KD and Anji started sharing their closeness to the other housemates where, as they both admit to Alexa and Samantha respectively, they had a crush on each other; however, KD admitted to Alexa that he seemed to emotionally drain Anji, and Anji admitted to Big Brother on the other hand that she puts the blame on herself when seeing KD being emotional and has thought of putting an end to the mess. Days have passed, and some housemates seem puzzled on the closeness of the two. When KD was nominated, it was Anji who helped him cope up emotionally; however, Anji seems to be avoiding KD at different instances. As the house's resident psychologist Dr. Randy Dellosa explained, KD seems to be emotionally needy and Anji's presence helped him cope up emotionally, but also shared about Anji being emotionally tired, with Doc Randy expressing the need of self-care. As days went on, KD starts to feel sad for what went with him and Anji. When the two were nominated for eviction, it was revealed that Anji gave two points to KD for making her uncomfortable when he got anxiety attacks; however, the two seemed to enjoy themselves after the nomination. TJ talks to Anji being concerned on what could KD think of her as she keeps on getting closer to him, and advises her to set boundaries with him the soonest. After talking to TJ, Anji called KD for a talk where, seemingly without taking any word from KD, she would go on to tell him that there won't be any chance for them to have a romantic relationship, tells him that only friendship is what she can give him, and tells him to move on. Right after, Anji went to Shanaia in the girls bedroom where she gave sympathetic aid to her; later, KD entered the girls bedroom to talk to Anji with Shanaia staying with her. From there, KD emotionally went on to apologize to Anji for making her carry his burden, aired his side what could have been the things he wished to say to her earlier, even wished he was the one evicted from the house instead of "Kuya John" just to do something else outside, and thanked her for giving him love knowing how it felt for someone to accept him even when she gets tired. As KD leaves Anji and Shanaia alone in the girls bedroom, he heads to the confession room by himself, asks Big Brother to call "Ate Alexa" to the confession room, enters the confession room seeing and embracing a sorrowful KD, and shared his thoughts with her on what happened. From there, Alexa advised KD to let go of Anji in his life, give focus on himself, and assure him that he'll get better without her. In turn, Big Brother advised KD to try to be brave, and assured that the pain will slowly decimate. In addition, Big Brother added that whatever Anji's decision may be for KD is mutually beneficial, and reminds him that, if he was hurt in the process, it is part of his love for her.
26	"Graduation"	Day 25	November 10, 2021
After her confrontation with KD, Anji felt scared for what would happen right after, and some housemates comfort her; KD has avoided seeing her to the point he leaves the housemates while cooking dinner. As the housemates have their dinner, KD chose to be alone at the boys veranda. Still feeling somber, Alexa goes near KD and comforts him as she gives him pieces of advice to help him move on from Anji and give himself the space to grow. In his chat with Anji, Big Brother admired her bravery for taking the leap for her and KD's benefit. Big Brother got to interact with Alexa about the hurdles of pursuing education while working as an actress, even revealing that she still attended classes while still going on tapings for "The Killer Bride" at that time, and that she would graduate from college being a dean's lister. However, she could not attend her graduation rites given her stay inside the Big Brother house. Right after, Big Brother called Brenda for a secret task: to be an English professor and teach such subject to the housemates. As the task was given, Brenda suddenly became emotional admitting that it was his dream to earn a college diploma for himself, but turned a bit comical admitting his lack of English proficiency. Despite the dilemma, Brenda performed the secret task albeit being done in a funny way even when Alexa asked him a question. Brenda completed his task, and Big Brother revealed to the housemates that Alexa will be given a graduation pictorial to be done inside the house, much to her joy as she could finally cap off her time in school really well.
27-29	"Japan Day," "Ninja Moves," and "2nd Eviction Night"	Days 25-29	November 11-13, 2021
On the same day, their weekly task was also made known to Chie and Eian; the two were also named as the tasked leaders for their said task. On the same day, their weekly task was also made known to Chie and Eian; the two were also named as the tasked leaders for their said task. Samantha turned twenty-nine on Day 25, this was celebrated by Alyssa preparing her food based on the recipe concocted by Samantha's mother whom later contacted her via video call. On the same day, Brenda was also tasked to act as an English teacher. Brenda was successful in the task, and as a reward, Alexa was given a graduation photoshoot which was perform inside the House. On Day 29, Albie left the House after becoming the latest evictee; Alexa, KD and Anji were saved from the eviction.

=== Week 5 ===
Episode No(s).	Title	Timeline	Original air date(s)
30-34	"3rd Nomination," "Laro Tayo," "Game Na," "Flag Game," and "Land Swimming"	Days 30-34	November 14-17, 2021
The following day, Day 30, Madam Inutz and Samantha were both named Heads of Household following their individual victories in the said challenge. Later that day Benedix, Chie, Eian, and KD were announced as the set of nominees for that week. No powers were used leaving the list of nominees the same. Also, in the same day, Alyssa, Benedix and Jordan were appointed as team captains for the upcoming Pinoy Big Brother Games 2021. The next day, on Day 31, the housemates were grouped according to their rank in the exercise challenge. Later, the Games were opened by Nesthy Petecio through a pre-recorded video. The three teams then battle afterwards for the first game, the Flag Game, wherein Bigateam incurred the most points.
34	"Land Swimming"	Day 32	November 18, 2021
The morning after their Flag Game, the housemates woke up to an unusual wake up call: the sound of water. As the housemates were doing their usual chores and having their breakfast, they were giving speculations on what could the next game be. Suddenly, 2020 Tokyo Olympics bronze medalist for boxing Eumir Marcial appeared on the plasma TV to extend his message of luck to the housemates. As the housemates continue with their chores, an image of a swimmer appears on the plasma TV, making swimming the possible challenge to take next. Big Brother then called team captains Benedix, Alyssa, and Jordan where they will undergo the Land Swimming challenge where, for five rounds, each representative must transfer the flag placed in point A by swimming using backstrokes onto a slippery floor to point B, and must return to point A after transferring their respective flags. The first representative to finish the game will earn 2 points, the second with 1 point, and the last with no point; and the team with the most points in the end will win this challenge. Just before revealing the task, Jordan shared that, having contracted COVID-19 before entering the Big Brother house, his capacity to breathe got slim as his lungs got weak when he recovered, and is making an effort to increase his breathing capacity. The housemates started preparing, and head to the activity area for the continuation of the Pinoy Big Brother Games. In the first round, Brenda for Bigateam, team captain Jordan for Jordan's Angels, and Chie for Phenomenal Altos start off with the first set of the Land Swimming game where, despite Brenda placing her flag in point B ahead of the two, Chie went ahead and finish first for the Phenomenal Altos with 2 points, Brenda with 1 point, and Jordan with nothing. In the next set, TJ for Bigateam, Shanaia for Jordan's Angels, and team captain Alyssa for Phenomenal Altos start off with the second round of the game as Alyssa, thanks to her height advantage, was able to win for the team again with 2 points, TJ with 1 point, and Shanaia with nothing. In the third round, team captain Benedix for Bigateam, Madam Inutz for Jordan's Angels, and Kyle for Phenomenal Altos faced-off where Kyle finished the round way ahead of Madam Inutz and Benedix, earning Kyle with 2 points, Benedix with 1 point, and Madam Inutz with nothing. After just three rounds of the game, team captain Jordan started to experience breathing difficulties and, as he was assisted by Samantha, he was brought to the confession room on Big Brother's orders to check his vital signs. Meanwhile, the housemates expressed worries and concern for Jordan. Back at the confession room, Big Brother informs Jordan that, as advised by the medic, he has to get some rest and will not continue to participate for the remainder of the game. He was being consoled by teammates Madam Inutz, Shanaia, Samantha, and Anji as Jordan became emotional, and the "angels" tried to motivate him as he was brought to the boys bedroom to get some rest. Back in the game, Karen for Bigateam, Samantha for Jordan's Angels, and KD for Phenomenal Altos started off the fourth round of the game as Samantha was able to earn the first 2 point for Jordan's Angels, with KD placing second with 1 point, and Karen on third with nothing. Eian for Bigateam, Anji for Jordan's Angels, and Alexa for Phenomenal Altos dueled for the final round of the game where Eian capped off the round for Bigateam with 2 points, Anji with 1 point, and Alexa with nothing. After five rounds, Phenomenal Altos won with 7 points, Bigateam in second place with 5 points, and Jordan's Angels in third with 3 points. After two games, the ranking remains unchanged as Bigateam stayed first with a total of 14 points, Jordan's Angels remain second with 9 points, and Phenomenal Altos at third with 7 points. After all the announcements, team captain Jordan remains affected by the event during the game.
35	"Love Yourself"	Days 32-33	November 19, 2021
After failing to earn a point for the Phenomenal Altos in the Land Swimming game, Alexa expressed her disappointment and worries of herself to team members Alyssa, Chie, Kyle, and KD; and they in turn comforted Alexa. Highlights of this episode focused on Alexa and how she carried insecurities in terms of her body, even including a clip of her sharing her negative thoughts about her body figure with Benedix. This led to Alexa seeking for a consultation with resident psychologist Dr. Randy Dellosa where it was revealed that she is possibly diagnosed with major depressive disorder caused by body dysmorphia, and has shared her thoughts with Big Brother of her experiences carrying that perception throughout her showbiz career. Saddened by her ordeal, Big Brother advised her not to underestimate her feelings, not to count her housemates out who failed to understand her concern, and assured her that she can overcome that at her own time. At the pool area, Alexa called Eian where she ranted about her thoughts to him, despite his efforts to dismiss and minimize her negative self-judgment. From there, Toni revealed that Alexa has been regularly monitored by Doc Randy, and the housemates continued to give her support. Karen gave Alexa a prolonged hug as they converse, and Brenda sharing his thoughts of her problems with Alyssa. This brings back to a moment where Alexa, on Day 28, shared when she had an emotional breakdown, admitting she is not healed but going through the process. On Day 33, a day after their second Pinoy Big Brother Game, members of Bigateam, Jordan's Angels, and Phenomenal Altos went to the activity area noticing some items on different tables, surprising some in shock while some tear up. From there, Big Brother explained that, while taking a break from the games, each housemate is going to share a story with the particular item symbolizing something they can be proud of. Alexa was called first, sharing her thoughts about her mom with a picture frame of her, and Madam Inutz sharing her thoughts about her children with a picture frame of them.
36	"3rd Eviction Night"	Days 33-36	November 20, 2021
The episode started with some highlights that happened in the week, including the third nomination and the Pinoy Big Brother Games. Continuing with their sharing activity on Day 33, this week's nominees Eian, Benedix, Chie, and KD shared their symbols of their success: Eian's microphone and a mini mixing console on how he made a living through online streaming, Benedix's pageant sash on how he regained his family's trust in him after tackling the entertainment field rather than nursing, Chie's car racing trophy on how she finished the race after cheating death when she had a vehicular accident during practice, and KD's vinyl record of his song "One of Many" on fulfilling his life's first achievement. With Alexa's deep experiences in mind, Big Brother got to interact with her mother, and discussed about their relationship. From there, Big Brother called Madam Inutz to the confession room to discuss on Alexa's sharing and about her thoughts on motherhood, where Madam Inutz became open about body dysmorphia and about mental health experiences. Right after, Big Brother gave Madam Inutz the opportunity to interact with Alexa's mother. Then, a secret task was given to Madam Inutz where she has to dress like Alexa's mother, and act appropriately based on the outfit used where Alexa should not be suspicious of her plan. The task was a success, and Big Brother called Alyssa and Samantha to get the gadget where Madam Inutz will use for the mother-daughter conversation. As Alexa was called to the confession room conversing with Big Brother, Alyssa and Samantha helped Madam Inutz prepare herself for the conversation. Alexa leaves the confession room in shock of Big Brother's news, she went to the living room and sees her mother virtually on a tablet covering Madam Inutz's face, and the mother and daughter had a conversation as Madam Inutz overhears their conversation, where she got to tearfully tell her mother about her medical diagnosis. With the final game happening on Day 34, the three teams face each other again for the "Bottle Weightlifting" where each player has to lift a barbell-like equipment and balance 5 bottles placed on top of each side (all in all, for a total of 10 bottles). Using the snatch technique in weightlifting, they will have to lift the barbell up while keeping the bottles from falling down. The points that each representative will earn will depend on the number of bottles he or she can keep standing. In the end, Bigateam won after garnering 41 points, followed by Phenomenal Altos with 32 points, and Jordan's Angels with 20 points. With the total points earned by the three teams for the games, Bigateam emerged as the winner. In second place were the Phenomenal Altos, while the third place were the Jordan's Angels. As a reward for winning the games, Bigateam will be immune for the fourth nomination week. With the third eviction night held live on Day 36, Chie was evicted after receiving the least net votes from the voting, saving KD, Benedix, and Eian from the process.

=== Week 6 ===
Episode No(s).	Title	Timeline	Original air date(s)
37	"4th Nomination"	Days 34-37	November 21, 2021
The episode starts with the aftermath of Chie's eviction on Day 36 as emotions ran high inside the house. Fellow nominees Benedix and Eian were both relieved as they were saved by the public, but saddened about Chie's eviction. Kyle, having formed a close friendship with Chie inside, was emotional seeing her leave the house and expressed fears on how the outside world would perceive their friendship. Alyssa, Karen, and Samantha were concerned for Kyle, while KD, Anji, and Shanaia consoled each other. Two days before the eviction, on Day 34, Alyssa unexpectedly remembers Madam Inutz's upcoming birthday. Later that evening, Big Brother summoned Alyssa, Alexa, Anji, KD, and Samantha to discuss Madam Inutz's birthday. They were then given a secret mission dubbed "PBB Kumusikahan Jamming Night," which they had to plan, and KD was tasked with writing a duet for Madam Inutz to sing with one of the housemates who would be revealed before the livestream. The five began to prepare the event's logistics, while KD began composing with Anji's assistance. The other housemates were later informed of the activities by Alexa. Alexa tells the other housemates about the idea the next morning, when Madam Inutz is nowhere to be found, and the girls begin practicing KD's song with Madam Inutz. Big Brother then informed the task leaders that KD had been chosen to perform a duet with Madam Inutz. In addition, Big Brother stated that Madam Inutz's birthday dinner will take place on that night, and they were given an additional assignment to complete: they must earn at least 500,000 Kumu diamonds for the food and the party itself, and if they want to enjoy a birthday drink, they must earn 1 million Kumu diamonds. The housemates then began to dress up, and Madam Inutz and KD began rehearsing for their duet soon. The live stream begins, with Alexa and Eian hosting the stream and KD giving the music. Some housemates talked with Madam Inutz as some were called to join the live stream. Until Madam Inutz was invited to the stream, where she sang a duet with KD. Finally, they raised 4.5 million Kumu diamonds, successfully completing the mission, and Madam Inutz would be honored with a birthday party, dinner, and drinks. The housemates surprised Madam Inutz with food and drinks after their successful live streaming activity, much to her surprise and delight. Then it was time to eat and drink, when ex-housemates John and Albie's recorded birthday greetings in video were shown, much to the delight of the celebrant and the housemates. Right after, each housemate gave their birthday message to the celebrant. Moments later, video greetings from her manager and friends, and another from her family brought her tears of joy. In the middle of the celebration, Madam Inutz was called to the confession room where, apart from offering her a drink inside and an interaction with Big Brother, video greetings from her children brought more tears of joy for her. In the end, she had her drink inside the confession room. With the nomination proceedings held on Day 37, Anji, Alexa, and Kyle were named as the nominees for the week. Alexa and Brenda did not use their powers, leaving the nomination list intact.
38	"Toy Stories"	Day 37	November 22, 2021
The morning of Day 37, evicted housemate Chie gave a message to the remaining housemates as their wake-up call, giving special mention to Anji, Shanaia, Alexa, and Kyle. Later in the day, Anji, Alexa, and Kyle were named as the nominees for the fourth eviction, and they calmly accepted the outcome. After the nomination proceedings, Kyle and Alexa conversed with TJ and Jordan at the boy's veranda about being nominated and what to do next, same as with Anji and Benedix at the pool area. After during their siesta, Shanaia noticed some big toy boxes in the living room, where this led to the housemates talking about a toy-related task and some about having toys back in their days. Later, Samantha was tasked by Big Brother to become a fairy godmother, to ask the housemates about their childhood and the toys they have played during their tender days. After Samantha reported her insights to Big Brother, KD was first called to the confession room where he, with fairy godmother Samantha's help, would transform into a big video game controller. After mealtime, Karen was called to the confession room where, after reminiscing with Big Brother her love for dolls, she would be transformed in to a doll named Mani-Karen. As Toni mentioned at the start of the episode, given their five week stay inside, an issue was raised about TJ's alleged lascivious behavior towards Shanaia as TJ received backlash online. Thus, Big Brother had a separate conversation with the boy and girl housemates to check on their relationship inside. The housemates of both sexes separately admitted that they were all comfortable with each other; Big Brother was glad to hear word from them, and reminded them to be mindful on showing appreciation to each other, esp. for the people not knowing the context of their actions. After their conversation, Jordan and Samantha led a conversation with the housemates in the living room tackling this issue where Anji brought up about the people seeing their actions on an opposing light, Madam Inutz on the narrow-mindedness of the netizens, Eian on the matter of them being monitored by cameras leading to "bad edits," and Shanaia on calling out housemates doing supposedly negative actions toward one another. With Big Brother's urging in mind, this led to the housemates setting healthy boundaries with each other, and ended the talk by sharing a group hug. As this episode ends, Toni reminded that harassment is something Big Brother has been serious about ever since, esp. when proof is presented; mentioned that the housemates themselves said no form of misconduct is felt inside; hoping that netizens be more critical and responsible on social media, and not to judge especially if the context and information is inaccurate and incorrect. NOTE: Toni's final message in this episode served as the show's statement in relation to the controversy.
39-43	"Transformers," "Freeze Task," "Golden Ticket," "Balloon Dart Game," "4th Eviction Night"	Days 37-43	November 23-27, 2021
On Day 38, Alyssa, Benedix, Eian, Karen, KD, Samantha, Shanaia, and TJ were given a secret task: they were required to act as toys and were not allowed to move when Brenda is around with them. In the event that any of them will move, they will earn a violation. On Day 39, the housemates were given their sixth weekly task wherein they tasked to earn 100 tickets while also doing the freeze task. For their first arcade game, they were able to earn 47 tickets. Also, KD was also given a golden ticket in order for him to see a recorded message of his dad. On Day 40, a clown distracted them several times during their freeze task. On the same day, their second arcade game was held for two rounds wherein they earned 29 tickets. On Day 41, the last game for the weekly task was held wherein they earned 100 tickets. For a total of 150 tickets, the housemates were successful for their sixth weekly task. That night, the female housemates had a girls night out and was streamed via Kumu. The fourth eviction night was held on Day 43. Kyle was evicted after receiving the least net votes from the voting, saving Alexa and Anji from eviction.

=== Week 7 ===
Episode No.	Title	Timeline	Original air date
44	"5th Nomination"	Days 42-44	November 28, 2021
Hours before the eviction night, Alexa and Anji shared their feelings with regards to the upcoming eviction. Later on, as seen in the previous episode, Kyle was named as the latest evictee, saving Alexa and Anji in the process. KD can't help but exclaim in shock as Kyle was named evicted, and some housemates became emotional, especially Samantha. Meanwhile, on Day 42, the girls had a girls' night out at the Kumu room. Before the female housemates went out of the Kumu room, the male housemates decided to prank them by letting them believe that Benedix and Kyle were in good terms. This, however, did not sit well with Alexa and the rest of the female housemates. Alexa, however, was honest to admit that she did not liked that her emotions were played and she was disappointed with Benedix. On Day 43, KD was being counseled by TJ and the other housemates on why he still remains unhappy, and how he could overturn this emotion. This has badly affected TJ who only wanted to help KD, conceded that he failed in helping KD get back better, and seems to think that he has become the obstacle or a villain to KD and Anji's now watered-down friendship. Just before eviction on Day 43, the housemates were called for their fourth Head of Household Challenge called Perfect Punch Challenge. The results were announced a day after where Anji emerged as the winner. With the nomination proceedings held on Day 44, Toni announced that Alexa, Karen, Samantha, and TJ were the new set of nominees. No powers were used in this round, keeping the list as is. Toni also revealed that the next eviction will be a double eviction night.
45	"House Divide"	Days 44-45	November 29, 2021
On Day 44, the housemates were awaken when Kyle, the latest evictee, gave them a wake-up call. Later that day, the housemates faced the fifth nominations wherein Alexa, Karen, Samantha and TJ were named as the newest set of nominees for the week. Toni further announced that this week will be a double eviction week. After winning the Head of Household that day, Anji was given a task. The task involves dividing the House into two, and the burden of placing who belongs to which group the housemates will belong rests upon Anji. On Day 45, Anji was called to the confession room wherein she divided the House membership. Afterwards, the housemates were in awe as all of their luggage were placed in the living area. Big Brother then called all of their attention and instructed them to gather around in the living area. Big Brother then told everyone that he had asked Anji to do a special task; Anji was later called to explain the task given to her. She divided the House into two groups: the first group were composed of Alyssa, Alexa, TJ, Karen, Jordan and Eian, while the second group were composed of Brenda, KD, Madam Inutz, Samantha, Benedix and Shanaia. After the division, Big Brother asked Anji on which group would she like to be with; she chose Brenda's group. Thereafter, Big Brother announced that since there are now two separate groups, the House will also be divided by the two groups. One group will only be allowed to stay in the living room area, the dining area, the boys' bedroom and the outdoor kitchen; while the other group will only be allowed to stay in the garden area, girl's bedroom and the indoor kitchen. The toilet and bathroom will be shared. As a twist, Anji was also tasked in which of the groups shall stay in the designated areas; Anji selected the first area. Afterwards, Big Brother informed them to pack their luggage and move to their designated areas. For the rules of the task, from that moment, Big Brother announced that both groups were not allowed to move into the other group's designated area. Barriers were also placed in order to mark the division. Both groups were also prohibited to talk with anyone from the other group in any forms of communication, directly or indirectly. As a consequence, both groups are totally invincible to each other. Any violation of these rules will have an impact to each group's given task. Later that night, Big Brother then instructed them that each group will be building a block tower. And at the end of the week, the group with the highest standing block tower will win immunity. For the blocks that they will use, they will have to get as much blocks as they can from a platform placed at the center of the pool using only improvised poles.
46	"Tower Task"	Days 45-46	November 30, 2021
On Day 45, the housemates were assigned to their designated places in the pool area where they could get their blocks; they were also prohibited to go into the pool. At Big Brother's signal, they started to gather their blocks. They were only allowed to get blocks within a 20 minute limit. While attempting to get the wooden blocks, TJ accidentally fell into the pool. The time was temporarily halted as Big Brother called on TJ to go to the confession room to be medically checked. Later on, Big Brother gave the housemates another 10 minutes to get more things in order to make their improvised poles more sturdy and long or just to get anything they think would help them get more blocks. Afterwards, Big Brother restarted the time for the task. Called separately, Big Brother told the housemates that starting that night each group were now allowed to build their respective towers. But they could only build their towers for eight hours. And these eight hours must be used wisely since the task will be for a week long. Afterwards, they were then instructed to move to the activity area were allowed to build their towers. They only work within the marked areas given to them; they were also not allowed to go beyond their areas. Also, a small area was given to each of the groups where they could build their towers. Later on, Big Brother instructed and gave a signal for them to stop. On Day 46, Eian became emotional due to the way on how Anji divided the groups, and that he was separated from his close friends.
47	"Tic Tac Toe"	Day 46	December 1, 2021
The housemates, having only 7 hours left, continued building their towers. With the thoughts that their tower will not be high enough, the group of Anji decided to rebuild their tower. Later, Big Brother stopped the groups from continuing their task—this left them with 5 hours and 21 minutes more to build their towers. After their tower building task, KD thought of singing for those in the Blue Team. This led to TJ becoming emotional fearing for his eviction given the current circumstance. Meanwhile, Eian still continues to be emotional because he was not grouped with his friends. Called separately in the confession group, the housemates were informed that they will be given another chance to get more blocks for their tower. In order to be able to get more blocks, they will have to participate in a 5 round challenge called Extreme Tick-Tac-Toe. Yellow Team (Anji's team) won 3 rounds, while Blue Team (Alyssa's team) won 2 rounds. After the challenge, TJ and Karen had a confrontation wherein the latter confronted TJ with his pessimistic and negative attitude towards their group's standing in the Tower Task. The two, however, were able to reconcile and patch things up afterwards.
48	"Tug of War"	Day 47	December 2, 2021
Alexa, Eian and Jordan had a conversation with each other on how they missed the other housemates from the Yellow Team; Alyssa and TJ, on the other hand, were talking about his confrontation with Karen earlier. Later on, the housemates returned in the activity area to build their towers. That night, Big Brother called the leaders of each of the teams: Eian represented the Blue Team, while Brenda represented the Yellow Team. At the confession room, individually they were informed that they will be participating in a Tug of War challenge. At the end, The Yellow Team lost the challenge. This led the Blue Team to take 150 of their blocks. Later, after the challenge, Big Brother announced that the two teams were prohibited to see each other. With this, the Yellow Team was only allowed to stay inside the House, while the Blue Team was only allowed to stay outside the House. In the middle of the episode, Toni announced that the eviction will be held on Sunday—a deviation from the regular Saturday eviction nights.
49	"Lipat Bahay"	Days 47-49	December 3, 2021
At night of Day 47, everyone became emotional after the announcement as the two teams were prohibited to go outside their designated areas, prohibiting all of them to see the members of the other team. On Day 48, the prohibition made by Big Brother had finally taken effect. In case a member of the Blue Team was called in the confession room, all the members of the Yellow Team were informed to stay inside their designated bedroom. In continuing their Tower Task, the two teams were called separately. At the activity area, each team's tower was hidden from the other team. The Yellow Team was called first to build their tower; they were followed by the Blue Team. In building their tower, the Yellow Team had decided to change its structure after 150 of their blocks were taken from the Tug of War challenge. At each areas in the House, all the teams were puzzled why Big Brother placed several flags: two yellow flags were placed inside the House while two Blue flags were placed outside. Later on, the members of the Yellow Team were individually called. They were asked that if given the chance to switch teams, which team would they individually choose? The same question was asked to each member of the Blue Team. Afterwards, all of them were given the time to contemplate on their decisions. Separately, each teams were instructed to see the progress of both teams' towers. Big Brother later revealed the purpose of the flags: if anyone from each team decides to transfer, he or she have to take one of the two flags. The transfer could only transpire if one member of the other team decides to do so. On Day 49, Big Brother gave the call to each of the teams if any of them will decide to transfer; they were given an hour to do so. If anyone decides to transfer, the housemate that decided to do it was instructed to get one of their flags and get inside the confession room.
50	"Reunited"	Day 49	December 4, 2021
At the end of the 1 hour period, no one tried to transfer to the other group. Individually, the members of each teams were called to the confession room. They were asked if they are willing to do whatever it takes to stay in the House. Big Brother then asked if anyone of them are willing to take the chance to knock down the tower of the other team by throwing a ball. Later, the teams were then given their last 2 hours to build their towers. Midway in their task, Big Brother gave the signal and allowed anyone to knock the other tower by using the ball given to each of them. However, no one took the chance to do it. At the end of the task, Big Brother proclaimed the Blue Team as the winner having attained the height of their tower to a length of 111 inches; the Yellow Team's tower only had a length of 99 inches. As a consequence of this, the Blue Team will be immune for next week's nomination, while the Yellow Team will be the only one who will be nominated. However, Big Brother haven't ended the Divided House twist just yet. With the House still divided, Big Brother gave both Alexa and Shanaia the chance to visit and interact separately with the Yellow Team and the Blue Team respectively for 5 minutes. Both of them were chosen by Kumu users through Kumunity Decides. Hours later, Big Brother gave all of the housemates the chance to be reunited as one House. At each end of the activity area, the teams were tasked to create a pathway using their blocks. They must be stacked on top of the blocks while building their pathways, and meet at the center of the activity area within an hour. At the center, using the same blocks used in doing the pathway, all of them must build a three layer platform that should be able to fit them all in it. Serving as their weekly task, they were successful. With this, Big Brother have ended the Divided House twist and the housemates can freely interact with each other.

=== Week 8 ===
Episode No.	Title	Timeline	Original air date
51	"5th Eviction Night"	Days 49-51	December 5, 2021
With the remaining hours of Day 49, the male housemates had their Boys' Night Out. Unknowingly for them, the female housemates were waiting for them with their payback prank where they placed salt in their water bottle containers, particularly those of TJ, Benedix, and Jordan. Afterwards, Big Brother called Alexa, Karen, Samantha and TJ—the four nominees, as they were given the task to prepare for a "Catch-up Party" for all the housemates. The "Catch-Up Party" had four stations: the first station was the living room, where it served as their performance station (spearheaded by Alexa); the second station was the kitchen for the food (spearheaded by Samantha); the third station was the garden area for the drinks (spearheaded by Karen); and the last station was the pool area for the games (spearheaded by TJ). Each of the station was served by one of the nominees and the housemates can only stay per station for 30 minutes only. On Day 50, the nominees began preparing for the food for their party. Later on, the four then surprised everyone with the said party. Big Brother later allowed everyone to continue their party until the end of the night. With the live eviction night on Day 51, TJ was announced as the first evictee for the night after receiving a total net votes of -3.05% of the public votes, saving Alexa in the first round of eviction. Meanwhile, Karen was announced as the second evictee after receiving a total net votes of 16.42% of the public votes, saving Samantha in the final round of eviction.
52	"6th Nomination"	Days 51-52	December 6, 2021
The episode opened with some of the previous footage where the tension between Alexa and Eian might have started. Toni later revealed that more updates about this issue will be provided to the viewers for the coming days. On Day 51, Madam Inutz and Benedix, with Brenda's assistance, prepared lunch as a treat to the nominated housemates. Later that night, TJ and Karen were evicted from the House. Emotions ran high after the eviction. On Day 52, Brenda and Madam Inutz were called by Big Brother and were asked if each of them will use their powers: for Brenda, his power to save; and for Madam Inutz, her nomination pass. Brenda decided to use his power, while Madam Inutz declined to use her pass. Based on the outcome of their tower task previously, Big Brother afterwards announced the list of nominees: Anji, Benedix, Brenda, KD, Madam Inutz, Samantha and Shanaia. With their defeat, the whole Yellow Team was automatically nominated. However, Brenda has decided to use his Power to Save, saving himself from eviction. As a twist, Big Brother also announced that this week, just like the previous week, will also be a double eviction week.
53	"Wire Maze Task"	Day 52	December 7, 2021
On Day 52, just like the previous evicted housemates, it was Karen and TJ who gave a message, as a wake-up call, to the remaining housemates. Later, Big Brother called everyone and checked their current well-being inside the House. They were given also a task to possibly guess if the news from outside the House that will be shared to them is "real" or "fake." Eian — who was chosen by Kumu users via Kumunity Decides — was called by Big Brother to the confession room and was tasked to deliver some of these news to the housemates. The housemates, who were at the living area, were tasked to guess whether those news were real or fake. The housemates were able to guess five news information correctly, enabling Eian to get news on the state of his father's health. Big Brother also instructed to deliver to the housemates the chance to earn messages about their loved ones by finishing the Wire Maze Task. The first five to finish the task will be able to get their respective messages from their loved ones.
54	"May Message Ka"	Days 52-54	December 8, 2021
The episode started with Big Brother informing Alexa and Brenda of their weekly task. Called Sikat ang Sayaw ng Pinoy (English: Pinoy Dance is Famous), the housemates must be able to present three dance types which are hip-hop, ballroom, and folk dance, with every housemate needing to have a contributing step. The housemates, in the end, will perform while wearing headphones, and must not make any mistake. In the morning of Day 53, since the previous episode, the housemates continued performing their Wire Maze Task with Benedix successfully finishing the task first, allowing him to learn a news about the condition of his grandfather. The other housemates continued performing the said task, and Shanaia and Jordan were able to complete the task. Therefore, Shanaia received the news of her mother and stepmother's upcoming wedding, and Jordan with the news of his family's current situation through his mother. Later, Big Brother informed Alexa and Brenda that they have two hours left to complete the Wire Maze Task. With two hours left, the remaining housemates continued to perform the task, and Brenda managed to complete the task. Thus, Brenda received a message from his partner, and assuring him that his pet dog is healthy. With only one more slot still unclaimed, Big Brother called on Eian to discuss with the remaining housemates to choose one housemate who will receive a message, with the housemate selecting Madam Inutz. With this, Madam Inutz received an update from her family on the condition of her mother. In the middle of the episode, Toni shared that Aly Palma—the winner of Kumu Houseguest for a Week—entered the House on Day 54.
55	"Hot Questions"	Day 54	December 9, 2021
As a houseguest, Aly Palma entered the House on Day 54. She was welcomed by Big Brother at the confession room. While the rest of the housemates were practicing for their weekly task, Alexa and Brenda were called to the confession room. Upon entering, they were surprised to see Aly. Aly then introduced herself to them. Being a performing arts graduate, Aly will be tasked to help them with their dance transitions and choreography. The three then proceeded to the activity area were Aly was welcomed by the rest of the housemates. In the morning of the same day, the housemates were awaken by some music from like a royal ball or fanfare. A grand golden chair that was fit for a monarch was also placed in the living area. In relation to these events, Brenda was called to the confession room. Big Brother informed him that, with her experience before as a Miss Q and A contestant, he will be tasked to help Big Brother in revealing the housemates' real individual characters. Dressed as a queen, Brenda will elicit answers from the questions that the housemates will be randomly picking from his fishbowl. The housemate who, based from Brenda's decision, gave the best answer among all of them will become Brenda's court jester. From the confession room, Brenda asked the housemates and Aly to gather around the living area. Brenda then shared their task where two or three housemates will answer one question, and the one with the best answer or opinion will advance to the next round. For the first question, Alyssa won against Samantha. For the second, Benedix won against Aly; for the third, Jordan won against Alexa; for the fourth, KD won against Anji and Shanaia; and for the last round, Eian won against Madam Inutz. For the final round, Brenda gave only one final question to all of the round winners. But as a twist, while one of them is answering, the other finalists were isolated in order for them not to hear the question and the answer of the others. At the end of the final round, Alyssa was chosen as the winner.
56	"Comments"	Days 54-55	December 10, 2021
The episode starts with the continuation of the events transpired on Day 54. After winning the final round of the earlier task, Alyssa was called by Big Brother to dress as a court jester. Later, Big Brother called Brenda for the housemates' opportunity to learn about comments for each of them from the outside world. For this tasks, two scrolls were prepared containing comments from the outside world, the scroll with the white tie contains positive comments, while the red tie for negative comments. Each housemate will choose from either of the two, and Alyssa alone will read those comments out loud. As the task was running, the housemates minus Brenda opted to read negative comments of each of them. Every housemate reacted to their respective comments calmly; however, one of Benedix's comment irked some housemates. One of Benedix's comments criticize his previous comment about "a woman who already has an established showbiz career," possibly referring to Alexa. Perplexed after the task, Benedix reached out to Alexa to shed light on the issue, even bringing in Eian to defend Benedix. In the end, despite being puzzled, Alexa decided to side with Benedix's explanation for now.
57	"6th Eviction Night"	Days 55-57	December 11, 2021
Continuing with the events of Day 55, after reading the negative comments for the housemates, Brenda was sharing his thoughts about the closeness between Alexa and Eian with court jester Alyssa. Later, Big Brother called on Brenda to air his concern of Brenda not sharing his negative comments on his fellow housemates face-to-face with them. The morning before the reading of negative comments, Alexa shared with Anji, KD, and houseguest Aly about the time they were to settle their rift with Eian where she have apologized to him. On the night after that activity, Alexa and Eian went on to talk about their misunderstandings. Later, "Queen" Brenda was called to the confession room for his turn to read comments of him from the outside world where he decided to read positive comments. After criticizing Brenda for not airing his negative comments upfront, Big Brother gave him a task: Brenda will sit on a throne just outside the garden area and, with court jester Alyssa's help, must share his negative comments on his chosen housemate upfront. After saying a prayer, Anji, Shanaia, KD, Jordan, Benedix, and other housemates were called by Brenda where they exchanged their observations of each other. Later, Alexa was called where Brenda opened up his thoughts on the former's interaction with Eian, and Alexa shared her thoughts about Eian to Brenda. Lastly, Eian was called and was asked by Brenda if he has feelings for Alexa, and had those cleared out. Right after, Eian talked to Alexa in private in the girls bedroom to clarify what stood between them. The live eviction night was held on Day 57, Benedix was announced as the first evictee for the night after receiving a total net votes of 8.66% of the public's votes, saving KD and Samantha in the first round of eviction. Meanwhile, Shanaia was announced as the second evictee after receiving a total net votes of 13.02% of the public's votes, saving Madam Inutz and Anji in the final round of eviction. By the end of the live episode, Toni announced that a face-to-face nomination will be held the next day—a deviation from the traditional method of giving points to housemates (for nomination) inside the confession room.

=== Week 9 ===
Episode No.	Title	Timeline	Original air date
58	"7th Nomination"	Days 55-58	December 12, 2021
On Day 55, conflict between Brenda and Eian continued where their issues were not yet resolved. The housemates did continue with their dance practice for their weekly task when task leaders Alexa and Brenda informed the housemates about a twist: only one housemate will hear their dance music with the wrong arrangement on their performance. From there, the housemates became more serious on their final hours of practice. On Day 56, the housemates were to perform for their Sikat ang Sayaw ng Pinoy dance task, and Alexa was chosen by Kumunity Decides over Brenda to perform wearing the headphones with the distorted musical arrangement. As the housemates were prepping up for their performance, actress-singer-dancer AC Bonifacio and former 737 regular housemate Zeus Collins were invited by Big Brother to judge their performance. The housemates started their first try of their performance, but was forced to perform again after incurring three mistakes on their first performance. On their second try, they managed to complete their performance without a single mistake. In the end, Big Brother announced that they were successful in their weekly task with the total average score of 89%. With the live eviction occurred on Day 57, after garnering the lowest percentage of votes to save, Benedix and Shanaia were both evicted from the Big Brother house. Emotions ran high right after. As announced by Toni, a face-to-face nomination will be held on Day 58—a deviation from the traditional method of giving points to housemates (for nomination) inside the confession room. The same night before the nomination day, Alexa and Madam Inutz were called by Big Brother and were asked if they're going to use their unused powers: Alexa's Power to Automatically Nominate and Madam Inutz's Nomination Immunity Pass. An emotional Alexa decided not to use her power for the last time, rendering it useless; Madam Inutz decided to use her power, making her immune from nomination. On Day 58, the housemates had their face-to-face nomination, where Alexa, Anji, Brenda, Eian, Jordan, and KD were up for eviction. This nomination was similar to All In season's All In nominations, where all housemates who received at least a point from their fellow housemates were up for eviction.
59	"Friendship Wins"	Days 58-59	December 13, 2021
The episode starts with some scenes where Brenda and Eian had a hard time resolving their conflict about Eian's sudden closeness with Alexa. While doing their usual activities, Samantha and Alyssa organized an impromptu double-date between Jordan and Madam Inutz, and Eian and Alexa. While the two pairs enjoyed their time slow dancing in the pool area through KD and Anji's music, Brenda stared at both Eian and Alexa with jealousy from the living room and expressed his distasteful thoughts of them with Samantha and Alyssa. Later, Samantha asked for Big Brother's help in organizing a blind date for Eian and Brenda to which Big Brother agreed to help. From there, Samantha and Alyssa set up for the blind date, and Eian and Brenda were brought to the activity area for the blind date. While inside, they both took their time and the opportunity to privately discuss their differences, and both agreed to restore their friendship to what it was before.
60	"Gift Of Truth"	Day 59	December 14, 2021
On the morning of Day 59, the housemates saw a ninja dressed as black Santa Claus delivering black Christmas gifts for the housemates. Right after, Big Brother called each housemate separately and informs them about what the black gifts contain. Called Regalo ng Katotohanan (English: Gift of Truth), the gift contains the names, points given, and reasons each housemate (including those who were evicted) gave since their first nomination. On Big Brother's cue, each housemate who is willing to open their gift must read their comments out loud and in front of all the housemates. They were asked if they are willing to open their gift boxes or not. At the living room, Big Brother called on the housemates who decided not to open their black gift to stand up and leave their black gifts on the table, being Anji, Jordan, and Eian. In the order of precedence based on the sizes of their gifts, Madam Inutz, Brenda, Alyssa, Samantha, Alexa, and KD were individually called to present their points given and comments from the housemates whose points were given. After presenting hers, Samantha opened up to Big Brother tearfully about hearing harsh criticisms while she was competing in beauty pageants, esp. being called "fake" and "trying hard." Big Brother would then remind Samantha that she is not fake and told that nothing is wrong with trying hard, giving her an emotional boost to motivate her. NOTE: The size of the black gifts are based on the number of nominations each housemate received since their first nomination. This was the reason why Madam Inutz's gift is smaller with one point for nomination from ex-housemate Karen, while KD's gift is bigger with 32 points for nomination (5 from the earlier face-to-face nomination not included) from all housemates except for Alexa, Samantha, and ex-housemates Chie and Shanaia.
61	"Eye Can Do It"	Days 59-60	December 15, 2021
After learning about and reading out the reasons for nomination, the housemates get to talk to each other after performing their Regalo ng Katotohanan task. With Anji still longing for her father's presence, Big Brother had a conversation with her mother and talked about the rumors Anji had thought that her father left them for a new family, to which was debunked. Right after, Big Brother calls Anji to the confession room this time for her to talk to her mother. The next morning, Day 60, Alexa, Brenda, and KD were called by Big Brother for a new task where they have to wear cone-shaped masks and test their eye sights. This made the other housemates surprised on what Big Brother did to them, and some of them assisted Alexa, Brenda and KD with some of their movements. Later, Big Brother called the other housemates, and made them wear cone-shaped masks like the first three housemates.
62	"Makuha Ka Sa Tingin"	Days 60-61	December 16, 2021
Continuing with the events in Day 60, the other housemates were tasked to wear cone-shaped masks like Brenda, Alexa, and KD. With their masks on, Big Brother instructed the housemates to change their lapel batteries together with Brenda, Alexa, and KD. At the living room, Big Brother gave the housemates a fun task to play with. Called Bring Brother, the format of the game has some similarities to the usual bring me game. For every round, three housemates will be racing to get a specific item Big Brother tells them and bring it to the center table of the living room. Samantha, Alyssa, and Brenda went first to bring ice cream in a cone with yellow packaging, and then eat that ice cream in tis entirety without the wrapper; Anji, KD, and Alexa went second to bring a blue-colored pillow from the boys' bedroom; and Eian, Jordan, and Madam Inutz went last to bring towels that were hung outside, and walk (like a fashion model) using those towels to the living room. In the end, Brenda, Anji, and Jordan completed their respective tasks first. Later, Alyssa and Madam Inutz were called by Big Brother for their weekly task. Called Makuha Ka Sa Tingin, the housemates with their masks on must get the giant puzzle pieces from the garden and pool areas, and bring them to the activity area where they will build the rectangular puzzle of a character from the Nativity scene. For this day, the housemates will do one character, but will do all three Nativity characters: Baby Jesus, Mary, and Joseph. With the same groupings used earlier in the Bring Brother task, they get the giant puzzle pieces outside the house, and went to the activity area to start solving. With the help of Brenda, the housemates were able to solve the front puzzle design, but encountered difficulties for the back portions. As the housemates are still solving the puzzle, task leader Madam Inutz seemed to be lonely as she has not contributed to the task and seems to experience a headache, and was then accompanied by Samantha to take a rest. Later, Big Brother informs the housemates that some of them can take their cone mask off, but will return to the house and not be in the activity area. Therefore, they're not allowed to help the other masked housemates without their mask. The housemates collectively let Madam Inutz and Samantha return to the house unmasked. Back at the activity area and after over an hour solving the puzzle, the housemates have completed the puzzle at last.
63	"Support PADS"	Days 61-62	December 17, 2021
One morning inside the house, Big Brother called the housemates to go to the garden area for an announcement where, for the second time in the season, the housemates will have another beneficiary or Kumunity to give help for, which revealed to be the Philippine Accessible Disability Services, Inc. (PADS) from Cebu. While the housemates were doing their usual routine, Big Brother had a conversation with Verniel Faustrilla, a polio survivor and PADS member, to talk about his life, disability, and career in sports; later, Madam Inutz and Alyssa were called by Big Brother and got to interact with Verniel. From there, Big Brother gave Madam Inutz and Alyssa gave them a task: they must experience Verniel's struggles by walking using crutches (Tagalog: saklay), must use only one of their feet and not touch the floor, and must not sit down while doing the "sacrifice." While using their crutches, Madam Inutz and Alyssa continued with their usual activities when, later, Big Brother informed that the two were not allowed to lean on any surface to rest. They were once again called by Big Brother for another task: they will get their food supplies from the Kumunity Pantry while using crutches and by using a basket with weights inside. Before doing so, the housemates will do a charades activity by having three housemates (Anji, KD, and Brenda) act out clues with pacifiers on their mouths for the housemates to guess the answer. Housemates will guess two ingredients for every round, and Madam Inutz and Alyssa will get such ingredients once the housemates get it right. As a twist, before they get the ingredients, the two must roam around the swimming pool ten times. The housemates were successful with their charades game, and Madam Inutz and Alyssa started their walk around the swimming pool. The outcome of the task was not revealed as it ended on a cliffhanger.
—	ABS-CBN Christmas Special 2021	—	December 18, 2021
The December 18 episode was preempted by the Andito Tayo Para Sa Isa't Isa: The ABS-CBN Christmas Special 2021. However, the remaining housemates, together with the evicted housemates, performed a dance number for the said Christmas special.

=== Week 10 ===
Episode No.	Title	Timeline	Original air date
64	"7th Eviction Night"	Days 62-64	December 19, 2021
The episode starts with the ongoing "sacrificial" special task of Alyssa and Madam Inutz, where both of them felt exhausted, particularly Madam Inutz. As the housemates have noticed the two women being exhausted, they made sure they guess every ingredient correct and fast. During the walk, Madam Inutz grew more weary, and Alyssa made an effort to motivate her and complete the task. After completing their task, Big Brother had called to the end of their "sacrifice," and Madam Inutz and Alyssa can freely move without any mobility device, and announced that they accomplished their task and will be able to provide assistance for Verniel. A day after the said task, the housemates got to interact with Verniel virtually, Madam Inutz and Alyssa shared the news of their experiences and the outcome of the task, and shared that Verniel will receive arm crutches and a sports wheelchair for completing Big Brother's task much to Verniel's delight. Later, task leaders Madam Inutz and Alyssa continued with their Makuha Ka Sa Tingin weekly task when Big Brother added a twist to the activity: to work on the second puzzle (Joseph,) only Madam Inutz, Alyssa, and Samantha will be wearing the same cone masks from earlier, while all other housemates will be wearing red-nosed cone masks obstructing the entrance of light. Therefore, making it more difficult to finish solving the puzzle. This made Brenda more demotivated, but still went on with the task. In the end, they completed the Joseph puzzle. Moments later, they were called to work on the final puzzle (Mary,) this time all housemates are wearing red-nosed cone masks from earlier. With a strategy prepared ahead of the round and Brenda's guidance, the housemates started, and have completed the final puzzle. Right after, Big Brother then called the housemates to remove their cone masks and see their progress. In jubilation, the housemates successfully completed their weekly task, and will be able to give one hundred thousand Philippine pesos (PHP 100,000) to PADS. The live eviction night was held on Day 64, Jordan was announced as the first evictee for the night after receiving a total net votes of 4.53% of the public votes, saving KD and Anji from the first round of eviction. Meanwhile, Eian was announced as the second evictee after receiving a total net votes of 2.72% of the public votes, saving Alexa and Brenda from the final round of eviction.
65	"Andito Para Sa Iyo"	Days 64-66	December 20, 2021
Unknown to the housemates inside the house that, two days before the eviction night (Day 63,) Typhoon Odette (international codename: Rai) has ravaged areas, especially in Mindanao. The next day, while doing their usual activities, the housemates got to see clips of news reports about the damage Typhoon Odette ravaged in some areas, including Surigao del Norte and Misamis Oriental. Bothered by the happening, Anji went to the confession room to express her worries for what was going on with her family in Siargao. From there, Big Brother got to reach out to Anji's mother, shared the news to Anji, and Big Brother assured her that he'll give her the time to contact them once signal is restored. Just like Anji, Brenda went to the confession room to share his worries with Big Brother about what went with his family in Misamis Oriental. However, Big Brother told Brenda that they're trying to make contact with his family on their situation. After leaving the confession room, the housemates congregated to the dining area in prayer. Moments later, Big Brother called Brenda to the confession room. As promised by Big Brother, Brenda got to hear the news from his sister on what happened in their area. From the confession room, the housemates consoled an emotional Brenda to keep his head high. Later, Big Brother called on the housemates to the confession room to discuss on the matter, and has announced that the third Kumunity they are going to help will be the victims of Typhoon Odette. With this, the housemates did pack food items as relief goods for the families affected by the typhoon. Moments later, Big Brother called the previous week's nominees (Alexa, Anji, Brenda, Eian, Jordan, and KD) to prepare and organize for the Kumu livestream for a cause where, as Big Brother told, 100% of the diamonds dropped on Kumu will be donated to the victims of Typhoon Odette and their families. From there, all the housemates have composed original songs intended for the livestream, and they did perform in the Kumu live stream from the Kumu room, where they gathered 2.677 million Kumu diamonds intended for the victims. Big Brother thanked the housemates for their help. With the live eviction that occurred on Day 64, Jordan and Eian were both evicted from the Big Brother house after garnering the lowest percentage of votes to save. Emotions ran high right after, especially for their close friends Madam Inutz, Brenda, and Alexa who earlier went to the hallway door standing by as Eian was on his way to leave the house. Before the episode ended, Toni announced that the virtual gifts sent on Kumu during the previous nomination week were also donated for the communities affected by Typhoon Odette.
66	"8th Nomination"	Days 65-66	December 21, 2021
The episode started with the housemates hearing the voices of Jordan and Eian as their wake up call. As the housemates leave their bedrooms, they noticed a large red gift in the living room, quite similar to the large black gift they saw on Day 58. From there, Big Brother announced that there will be another face-to-face nomination. The procedure is the same as what transpired on Day 58, however, the housemates will give positive points and reasons to their fellow housemates instead of giving negative reasons as per tradition. Furthermore, Big Brother added that the housemates with the lowest number of positive points received will be up for nomination. In the end, Alyssa and Brenda were declared safe from nomination; this means Alexa, Anji, KD, Madam Inutz, and Samantha are up for another double eviction after garnering the lowest number of positive points. Moments later, Big Brother called the housemates to the confession room for a very important matter. Given the ongoing situation brought by Typhoon Odette, Big Brother gave a challenge to the housemates to live with limited daily water supply, without lights (in the living room, kitchen, and all bedrooms), without the use of air conditioning units and the induction stove all "in the name of compassion." Once this is fulfilled, Big Brother "will reciprocate all of their sacrifices" by providing additional help for the victims, their families, and communities affected. The housemates unanimously accepted the challenge.
67	"Secret Santa"	Day 66	December 22, 2021
Since the previous episode, where the housemates had accepted Big Brother's challenge, they started living life with nearly no electric power, and limited food and water supply in the Big Brother house. Meanwhile, Big Brother called Samantha to the confession room to hear news from her mother on updates after Typhoon Odette made landfall in her home province of Palawan. Later, Big Brother called Brenda, Anji, and Samantha to the confession room for their weekly task. Given the fact that their respective hometowns were badly ravaged by Typhoon Odette, their weekly task was given aimed at helping families and communities affected. Called Andito Tayo Para Sa Isa't Isa (English: We Are Here For Each Other), the housemates will dress as reindeers to deliver a large Christmas gift. To do this, a 14-layered Christmas tree has to be stacked using green cups and a yellow cup (to evoke the star on the Christmas tree-top) on top of the cart, to which they will pull around the house-shaped route. To complete the challenge, they must turn around for a hundred (100) laps without letting the cups fall; otherwise, they must return and redo from the starting point. Once completed, they will be able to give one hundred thousand Philippine pesos (PHP 100,000) to the affected families and communities. The housemates started on the weekly task, and tire and tension were felt in the performance of the task. With Alyssa and Samantha's guidance, they initially completed 40 out of 100 laps, and have decided to take a break. The next morning, Big Brother got to interact with Alyssa "Ysang" Ramos, the winner of the Kuya's Christmas Elf campaign on Kumu. For her first task, Ysang was asked to give a wake up call for the housemates; and later, would introduce herself as Big Brother's Christmas elf to the housemates. Moments later, Samantha and Alyssa would be called by Big Brother for their secret task: they will be the secret Santa Claus of the house. The two will decide on who among the housemates will receive gifts from their loved ones in the outside world. The first batch to receive those gifts are three with two gifts for each housemate, and the secret Santas selected Madam Inutz, Alexa, and Anji. To do this, Samantha and Alyssa will place those gifts on the Christmas tree in the activity area, and it must not be known or seen by the other housemates.
68	"Surprise Gifts"	Days 66-67	December 23, 2021
The episode started with the housemates getting up to Christmas elf Ysang's wake up call. As the housemates were doing their usual activities, Big Brother lets Ysang annoy Brenda with cheesy pick-up lines, stirring excitement for Alyssa, Madam Inutz, and Samantha. Later, Samantha, Brenda, and Anji were called to the confession room for the continuation of their weekly task where Big Brother informs them that they will add one more layer to the original 14-layered Christmas tree and make thirty (30) laps for that round, for a total of seventy (70) laps once completed. As another twist, thanks to the gifts Alyssa and Samantha placed in the activity area, the housemates can get those gifts while doing the weekly task. However, going through this path will be at the discretion of the housemates. The housemates must cross the house's middle path forming the number 8, and must make five (5) laps to get one of all six gifts for either Alexa, Anji, or Madam Inutz to open. From there, the task leaders have that discussed with the housemates, and their time for continuing their weekly task starts. The housemates went to the activity area, and have found the gifts placed below the Christmas trees. Because of Kumunity Decides, Alexa and Madam Inutz won't be pulling the cart with the housemates, and guide them instead. They completed the first five laps, giving Anji the chance to open her first present: a greeting card and a necklace from her mother with a promise ring from her missing father. This brought Anji to tears as the housemates were cheering her on. Later, the housemates continued with the task when most cups fell from the cart down the floor. The housemates restacked the cups from the starting point and cautiously started moving the cart again, but had to repeat after a second fall. After completing another five laps, Alexa was given the chance to open her gift: a suitcase to which her mother (through her voice message) explains that it will be used for her future family vacation. The housemates then continued with their task, this time, being careful when crossing the middle path to prevent a fall, until it occurred forcing them to restart. After five more laps, Madam Inutz was given the chance to open her gift: a rosary and a voice message from her father expressing his gratitude to her, bringing her to tears. As time went on, the housemates slowly and cautiously completed three more rounds of five laps, and this gave way for Alexa, Anji, and Madam Inutz to open their second gifts: a planner, a ukulele, and a wristwatch respectively. In the end, the housemates completed 70 out of 100 laps, ending the task for the day.
69	"Kaya Natin To"	Days 67-68	December 24, 2021
On a new day in the house, task leaders Samantha, Anji, and Brenda were called to the confession room for the final time of their weekly task where Big Brother informs them that they will add one more layer to the 15-layered Christmas tree and make thirty (30) laps for that round, to complete the task with a hundred laps. With Christmas elf Ysang helping Big Brother and thanks to Kumunity Decides, KD and Anji won't be pulling the cart with the housemates, and guide them instead. This brought surprise to the task leaders, particularly Brenda who, among all the housemates not given the time to guide the pack, jokingly complained about his muscle pain from doing the said task. After Samantha giving instructions to KD and Anji on what to keep watch of, the housemates continued with their weekly task, build the 16-layered Christmas tree, and started moving. Despite the inclement weather and Ysang's constant messaging that shocked the more focused housemates, they moved forward with the task until the cups fell due to strong winds despite the cart being unassisted. As the task was going on, miscommunication arise due to KD and Anji's conflicting commands, making it difficult for the housemates to focus. As they completed their 99th lap, Big Brother informs the housemates that they will add one more layer to build the 17-layered Christmas tree, and all housemates will pull the cart without any watchers. From there, the housemates revamped their strategy, started, and completed the required one hundred (100) laps ending the sacrifice task. With this, they were able to give one hundred thousand Philippine pesos (PHP 100,000) to the affected families and communities, and Big Brother restored electric power, lighting, and water supply in the house as promised. As the housemates were taking their rest, Ysang appeared to congratulate and interact with the happy housemates.
70	"Big Paskoncert"	Days 68-69	December 25, 2021
Just days before Christmas and while in the middle of their sacrifice task, Big Brother talked to the housemates about Christmas, to which the housemates just did not feel like celebrating it somehow. As Madam Inutz reads out the task letter, the housemates are going to perform in the Big Paskoncert where they all must have an opening and closing performances, and each of them must have a solo performance. Then, the housemates got their things in the storage room to get the things needed for them to choose a song and plan and organize the program. As they continue with planning, KD and Alexa helped compose a song for the closing act of the housemates. After a limited time of preparation, Big brother informs them that the Big Paskoncert will take place at this point, and were given four hours to rehearse and get dressed. Toni then opened the episode with the housemates performing their opening act: a dance presentation of a remixed version of Yeng Constantino's "Pasko Sa Pinas". Big Brother got to ask the housemates individually on how they celebrate Christmas. Samantha shared that her father used to organize parlor games for the kids and give away small packs of assorted candies being the purok president during their time, KD shared that he spends Christmas with his extended family, Anji with giving away candies or money to those who are singing Christmas carols, Madam Inutz with taking her kids to church and coming together for noche buena, Alexa with spending Christmas with her relatives on her mother's side as her mother's birthday falls on Christmas Day itself, Brenda with treating Christmas Day as just an ordinary day, and Alyssa with spending a simple Christmas with family. Back at the Big Paskoncert, Alexa performs her original composition "Kahit Saan, Kahit Kailan", and got to see her mom and interact with her for 100 seconds in person. Samantha performs an interpretative dance to Catriona Gray's "R.Y.F", and also got to see her mom and interact with her for 100 seconds in person. KD performs his original composition "Holiday Love", and received a recorded video message from his parents. Brenda performs his rendition of Moira Dela Torre and Jason Hernandez's "Ikaw at Ako", and got to see his mom and interact with her for 100 seconds in person. Anji performs her rendition of Moira Dela Torre's "Tagpuan", received a recorded video message from her mom, hears news from Big Brother that her family in Siargao is safe, and Anji gives a message for her mom. Alyssa performs her rendition of Gloc-9's "Simpleng Tao", and got to see her younger brother and interact with him for 100 seconds in person. Madam Inutz performs her original song "Sangkap ng Pasko", and got to see her father and interact with him for 100 seconds in person. As the Big Paskoncert was to end, Toni gives her Christmas message to the viewers before passing on to the housemates as they performed an original composition to cap off the mini-concert. Big Brother gives his Christmas message to the viewers as the episode ends.

=== Week 11 ===
Episode No.	Title	Timeline	Original air date
71	"8th Eviction Night"	Days 69-71	December 26, 2021
On Day 69, moments before noche buena, the housemates were called by Big Brother for them to choose the housemate whom they will give a gift, and find items they are going to give away. Later, the housemates have their own Christmas dinner and exchange gift activity. Right after, Big Brother informed the housemates that he has a gift for them: he will give the amount of P1 million to the victims and communities affected by Typhoon Odette. On Christmas Day, Day 70, Big Brother gave the housemates a wake up call. Later, Samantha and Alyssa were called to the confession room to continue with their secret task: bringing the gifts of KD and Brenda inside the house without all other housemates knowing and seeing. They were successful in bringing those gifts to the living room below the Christmas tree, and both KD and Brenda got their gifts when all housemates came out from hiding. KD received a pair of shoes and a framed family picture, while Brenda received a nightlight and a framed artwork with Brenda and his late father. Deemed as a success, Big Brother gave Samantha and Alyssa their gifts, and opened their gifts in the living room. Samantha received a travel blanket and a green-colored dress from her mom, while Alyssa received a bracelet from her brother and a family shirt including pictures of her pet dogs from her boyfriend Kiefer Ravena. Later, they tell the housemates they are their "secret Santas" in the house. The live eviction night was held on Day 71, Alexa was announced as the first evictee for the night after receiving a total net votes of 17.03% of the public votes, saving Madam Inutz for the first round of eviction. Meanwhile, KD was announced as the second evictee after receiving a total net votes of 16.99% of the public votes, saving Anji and Samantha for the final round of eviction. After their respective departures, Big Brother congratulated Alyssa, Anji, Brenda, Madam Inutz, and Samantha for making it to the Celebrity Kumunity Final Five, and informed them that they will face new sets of challenges in order to make it to the Celebrity Kumunity Top 2 by the end of the week.
72	"The Final Five"	Days 70-72	December 27, 2021
Continuing the events transpired on Christmas Day, Day 70, Big Brother showed the official trailer of the movie Love At First Stream to the housemates. KD was then called by Big Brother for a fun task: the housemates will reenact a scene from the movie. For this task, KD will be the director, and separate the housemates in to three pairs: Madam Inutz and Alexa, Brenda and Anji, and Alyssa and Samantha. After their rehearsals, all three pairs got in to serious acting. Later, Big Brother gave a twist to the task where they will reenact the same scene using the following genres: horror (Brenda and Anji), action (Madam Inutz and Alexa), and musical (Alyssa and Samantha). On the evening of the same day, the housemates had their Christmas party in the garden area where they played a game, had some dinner, and even invited a disk jockey to play music for the housemates albeit virtually. On the morning of the day of eviction, Day 71, the nominated housemates were preparing to pack their things in preparation for their eventual eviction. As Alyssa got sad for the upcoming eviction night, she was called by Big Brother to check her up, and asked for a picnic time for the nominated housemates with Brenda's help. The two started preparing food, and set up their picnic area in the garden area where they had meal time. There, the housemates shared either their saddest, unforgettable, or joyful memories with each other. With the live eviction occurred that evening, Alexa and KD were evicted from the Big Brother house, causing disbelief among the remaining housemates in the house. After the eviction, Big Brother congratulated Alyssa, Anji, Brenda, Madam Inutz, and Samantha for making it to the Celebrity Kumunity Final Five, and then informed them that they will face new sets of challenges in order to make it to the Top 2. After getting themselves changed, the Final Five noticed something in the living room where Big Brother explained their first challenge, the 10 Million Diamonds Challenge, which is to occur on that night. By the end of the episode, Toni opened the voting process for choosing the housemates to be part of the Celebrity Kumunity Top 2.
73	"Diamond Challenge"	Day 72	December 28, 2021
74	"Challenges"	Days 72-73	December 29, 2021
75	"Ultimate Tapatan"	Days 73-74	December 30, 2021
76	"Final Tell All"	Days 74-75	December 31, 2021
77	"Celeb Top Two"	Days 75-77	January 1, 2022
Continuing with the events during the Final Five Tell All, Big Brother announced the ex-housemates' votes for the challenge. Alyssa topped with 7 votes (from Chie, Karen, Kyle, TJ, Jordan, Alexa, and Eian), Anji came next with 3 votes (from Albie, Benedix, and Shanaia), Samantha and Madam Inutz are tied with one vote each (from KD and John respectively), and Brenda went last with no votes. The next day, Day 76, Big Brother called the housemates for an important matter: the opportunity to use their collected diamonds to Vote to Save themselves, to Vote to Save their fellow housemates, or to Vote to Evict one of their housemates. After being called individually by Big Brother to the confession room, the Final 5 have made their final decision: Samantha, Madam Inutz, Brenda, and Alyssa used their diamonds to save themselves, while Anji uses her two million diamonds to save herself and give Madam Inutz and Samantha twenty-five thousand diamonds each to save. On the morning of Day 76, the Final Five were called by Big Brother for an activity in relation to their New Year's Eve dinner held later that evening: they will write on a sticky note the things they want to get rid of and change for the new year. In the evening, after getting dressed up, Big Brother asked the housemates to get t-shirts, paste their sticky notes on their shirt, share the things they want to leave and change before the start of the new year, and removing those sticky notes from their shirts while listening to Big Brother's thoughts. From there, the housemates celebrated the new year with Big Brother together. The live Celebrity Kumunity Top 2 reveal held on Day 77, the last eviction night for the Celebrity Edition. There, Toni announced that the Celebrity Kumunity Top 2 will receive one hundred thousand pesos (P100,000) each. On this night, siblings Nathan and Raf were introduced as the first two new adult housemates to enter the Big Brother house in person. Before making their entry inside the house, Big Brother welcomed Nathan and Raf to the cockpit, and a task was given to welcome the other adult housemates with Nathan being assigned as their pilot and Raf as their flight attendant. Additionally, a secret weekly task was given to them where they must not let the new housemates know that they are siblings. Failure to complete the secret weekly task won't award the adult housemates their first weekly budget. Alyssa and Anji were named as the Celebrity Kumunity Top 2, and Brenda, Madam Inutz, and Samantha were evicted from the house after garnering the three least percentages of votes to save. As announced at the start of the live show and for being named as the edition's Top 2, Alyssa and Anji will receive one hundred thousand pesos (P100,000) each. Coming Day 78, Alyssa and Anji will leave the Big Brother house temporarily, and another batch of adult housemates will enter the house for the start of the Adult Edition.

== Adult ==
=== Week 12 ===
Episode No.	Title	Timeline	Original air date
78	"Big Arrival"	Days 77-78	January 2, 2022
As Day 77 was to end, Big Brother gave Alyssa and Anji a congratulatory dinner; and as their chapter is to end temporarily, a new Kumunity is to enter the Big Brother house: the Adult Kumunity where siblings Nathan and Raf entered the PBB Airlines cockpit and were given their secret task and their first weekly task. At the PBB Terminal, the live episode started with a live performance from Celebrity ex-housemates Alexa and KD with Rico Blanco performing "Pinoy Tayo", the theme song of the adult edition. Continuing with the events of Day 77, Nathan and Raf were sent to the PBB Airlines lounge; meanwhile, Alyssa and Anji got to communicate with the siblings about what to do as housemates. Later, Nathan and Raf were called by Big brother to the cockpit where Big Brother got to learn about them deeply. As the night goes deep, Alyssa and Anji goes to sleep inside the house, while Nathan and Raf inside the lounge. The next day, Nathan and Raf were called to the cockpit where, as part of their secret task, Nathan gets to pick a name from rolls of paper in a fishbowl; in the end, Nathan picked the name Policarpio, and he will be known as Policarpio until the end of the weekly task. In chronological order of introduction, the following housemates were welcomed and were given their respective boarding passes: Seham and Zach who are taking the business class, Aleck who is taking the economy class, Thamara with business class, Michael Ver with economy class, Isabel with business class, and Laziz and Gin with economy class. As the housemates have entered the terminal, Nathan as Policarpio entered the terminal where he reads Big Brother's task letter to the adult housemates before entering the PBB Airlines, and Alyssa and Anji gave details to what their task may be through a recorded video. Meanwhile, Big Brother gives his parting message for Celebrity Top 2 Alyssa and Anji as they leave the Big Brother house temporarily. The live episode ended with the adult housemates still continuing with their pre-entry task.
79	"Plane Task"	Days 78-79	January 3, 2022
Continuing with the events of Day 79, Alyssa and Anji wakes up for the last time inside the house, while Nathan and Raf in the lounge. Big Brother asked the Celebrity Top 2 to help prepare the items in the PBB Airlines cabin, and give a handwritten message for the new housemates boarding in business class. As the Top 2 were jotting down messages, Big Brother talks to Nathan and Raf in the cockpit where Nathan picked and uses the name Policarpio, and got to see their outfits in the lounge. As Alyssa and Anji starts to prepare the amenities and leave messages in the cabin, Nathan and Raf received more details from Big Brother that: as flight attendant, Raf will be meeting the new housemates in the passenger terminal, and must offer welcome drinks to business passengers only. Aside from the weekly budget, Big Brother informs the two that they could earn an immunity pass should they succeed in this task. The two were given a chance to take a sneak peek of the airline cabin, and were informed that the passengers will arrive soon and Nathan will come out to see the new passengers and read out Big Brother's task. As Flight Attendant Raf made her way in the passenger terminal to prepare herself, Seham enters the terminal first and instantly recognizes Raf having seen her vlogs before entering the Big Brother house. Zach enters the terminal, and joins Seham in the business class. Aleck enters the terminal and interacts with Raf, Seham, and Zach. Just like Seham, Thamara enters the terminal and recognizes Raf, and joins Seham and Zach in the business class with Aleck. Michael Ver, Isabel, Laziz, and Gin all entered the terminal, and continued to converse. As the first batch of housemates have arrived, Nathan enters the terminal to introduce himself as Captain Policarpio, reads out Big Brother's first task for them, and have the housemates watches an instructional video from Celebrity Top 2 Alyssa and Anji. In this task, the housemates must line up and balance the plane's wing provided for ten seconds; otherwise, they must restart from the beginning. Once completed, they will finally enter PBB Airlines. The housemates starts to formulate a strategy and, after a series of attempts later, they were able to complete their first task. After their task, the housemates continued to interact with each other when Isabel suddenly found a piece of paper with the word "Policarpio" printed out, and kept it for herself. Moments later, the housemates received another message from Alyssa and Anji informing them they can board in the PBB Airlines.
80	"Flying High"	Day 79	January 4, 2022
Some moments after their first task, the housemates were told to get their backpacks as they will fall in line at the departure area, starting with business class holders. At this point, some housemates are observing Raf and Nathan disguising as Policarpio; and as the housemates were being sent to the cabin, Nathan and Raf talked about what happened with each other's activities for the secret task and prepared as they were to be brought to the cabin. Once the two are in the cabin, Raf prepares and welcomes the housemates to the PBB Airlines cabin. After a mini activity from Flight Attendant Raf, Nathan as Captain Policarpio gave a short message. Then, the two gave their monikers, with the other housemates following suit. Suddenly, Seham seemed to notice the semblance between Raf and Policarpio, but Policarpio have redirect their attention to other housemates. The housemates have their opportunity to chat with Big Brother for the first time with Isabel wondering whether to take a seat at either the cockpit chairs reserved for the captain and the flight attendant or not, and Thamara getting emotional as she shared to Big Brother her experiences as she has auditioned numerous times to become a housemate. Captain Policarpio and F.A. Raf were called by Big Brother as they're about to take-off, Raf informs the other housemates the news, Captain Policarpio giving his message from the cockpit, and PBB Airlines starts to take off. While in the aircraft, Captain Policarpio, F.A. Raf, and the housemates watched an in-flight safety video from ex-Celebrity housemates Samantha, Madam Inutz, and Brenda. As they converse, turbulence is felt inside the aircraft, and Captain Policarpio has to shake two hour glass bottles with rocks inside and transfer the contents at the bottom for the turbulence to end. Per Big Brother's instructions, F.A. Raf provided foldable tables and wooden trays for business and economy classes respectively. F.A. Raf then served food for the passengers, as she had her meal with Captain Policarpio in the lounge. After mealtime, the passengers prepared themselves for sleep, capping this night for the housemates.
81	"Babylandia"	Days 79-80	January 5, 2022
82	"Baggage Task"	Days 80-81	January 6, 2022
83	"Pretenders"	Days 81-82	January 7, 2022
84	"The Investigators"	Days 82-83	January 8, 2022

=== Week 13 ===
Episode No.	Title	Timeline	Original air date
85	"HOH Challenge"	Days 83-85	January 9, 2022
Before the end of the weekly task, the housemates were having fun in their mini talent show with hosts Gin and Laziz, but Nathan and Raf did not forget their secret task despite the hurdles. However, as the two admitted to Big Brother, Nathan and Raf have started to miss each other's company. Continuing with the events of Day 83, after the end of their secret weekly task, Nathan finally introduces himself as Nathan and not Policarpio, where he shared his time as an instructional pilot promoted to commercial pilot only to be interrupted by the pandemic, and emotionally shared his sacrifices when his wife was diagnosed with cancer, his parents contracting COVID-19, and how Raf helped him stay strong. After the sharing, Nathan went to the storage room to replace his "Policarpio" nametag with that carrying his real name. Moments later, Big Brother called Nathan and Raf where the two discussed who among them will take the Nomination Immunity Pass where Raf decided to give the pass to Nathan. Back at Babylandia previously, a task was given to Nathan as Captain Policarpio and the housemates to practice to fly a drone. As days went on, they continued practicing, this time, to fly the drone to pass through obstacles. As the housemates were to undergo their first Head of Household challenge, they must navigate a drone using a remote control through an obstacle course consisting of a set of four hoops of varying sizes and heights, and of a tunnel. The housemate that can land their drone at the end point at the fastest time wins the challenge. As Isabel was chosen by the Kumunity, she only has to go through three hoops instead of four. Despite difficulties faced by all the housemates, Nathan emerged as the Head of Household, and he will be such in time for their first nomination.
86	"Bahay Namin"	Days 84-85	January 10, 2022
In a new day, Isabel and Seham were working out, while Laziz was preparing their food. Meanwhile, Big Brother called the housemates separately for a matter pertaining to their next task: each housemate must draw lots to decide who gets a rolled paper with a black "X" mark (Aleck, Michael Ver, and Zach) as they will be separated from the housemates starting the same evening and sleep in the activity area. The next morning, moments after their wake up call, Big Brother informs the housemates inside the house of why three of them are separated from them for their next task, and that they will not communicate with them until Big Brother says so. Seham was called to hold a meeting with the housemates to do their weekly budgeting, even taking to mind Laziz who never eats pork. The boys in the activity area got to talk about their purpose being separated from the housemates, while Isabel and Nathan chat about their previous task. Later, after hearing Big Brother's announcement, Nathan and Thamara called the housemates to create a "Big Brother Subdivision" to symbolize their togetherness. They went to the garden area and saw pictures of their homes in various sizes. As they brought them inside, they hear Big Brother's message, and Isabel suddenly became emotional midway. The housemates started arranging their houses, and shared about their houses and their stories: Thamara's house in Davao, Laziz's family apartment in Tashkent City, Gin's small hut inside a cemetery in Cebu, Seham's house in Iloilo, Raf and Nathan's home in Las Piñas, and Isabel's beach house in Catbalogan.
87	"Build A House Task"	Days 85-86	January 11, 2022
88	"Fun With Ginifer"	Day 87	January 12, 2022
89	"Miss Ko Kayo"	Days 87-88	January 13, 2022
90	"Home Builders"	Day 89	January 14, 2022
91	"Take Off"	Days 89-90	January 15, 2022
Replay episode of January 3, 2021

=== Week 14 ===
Episode No.	Title	Timeline	Original air date
92	"Soar High"	TBA	January 16, 2022
Replay episode of January 4, 2021
93	"Adult Secret Task"		January 17, 2022
Replay episode of January 5-6, 2021
94	"Kumu Build a House"	Days 92-93	January 18, 2022
95	"Video Challenge"	Day 94	January 19, 2022
After the roof and its frame fell off, Isabel brought the matter to Aleck, Michael Ver and Zach. Soon after, Aleck and Michael Ver went to the activity area to inspect and restart building the frame, Zach substituted to complete finishing the roofing, and the housemates continued with building the house with limited time left. With the lack of materials the housemates had, Big Brother called Nathan and Laziz to get and bring more materials from the storage room: wooden boxes that would help bring the house's height much higher, therefore restoring hope in finishing the task. After some few minutes, the housemates finished building the house. Before the verdict, Big Brother asked Nathan to measure its height if it reached 6 ft. The house looked sturdy having stood strong for 10 minutes and reached more than 6 ft., the housemates won in their weekly task. In addition, as Isabel would emotionally break the news to them, Gin's typhoon-stricken house will soon be repaired, causing joy inside the house. The next day, Gin noticed there are ten chickens in their daily supply instead of nine, somehow teasing about Zach's return to the house. Unbeknownst to them, Zach was being welcomed by Big Brother, and enters the house surprising the housemates. After mealtime and all excitement, Zach and Thamara were called by Big Brother for another weekly task. Based on a topic Big Brother brought up to them, the housemates must create three video challenges for the Kumunity to copy, with each video challenge bearing a unique hashtag. At the end of the task, they must accumulate a total of 10,000 Kumu clips for the three videos created using the unique hashtags to win the task. The housemates, with Aleck and Michael Ver virtually present, wasted no time throwing away ideas. Later, the housemates created and shot the first two video challenges. First was a mix of singing a particular line and the "try not to laugh" challenge where the housemates will hit those laughing with a pillow; and last was a series of romantically cheesy pick-up lines provided in pairs by Nathan and Isabel, Gin and Laziz, task leaders Zach and Thamara, Michael Ver and Seham, and Seham and Aleck where Seham has to talk to the two housemates virtually through the plasma TV in the living room.
96	"House Supervisor"	Days 94-95	January 20, 2022
In a new day inside the house, task leaders Zach and Thamara were called by Big Brother where, as their first two video challenges will have its premiere on Kumu, the two are going to decorate the Kumu room. While decorating, Thamara randomly asks Zach about love. Soon after, the housemates went to the Kumu room and hosted the livestream as the two video challenges are being premiered. Thanks to Kumunity Decides, Isabel and Thamara were called by Big Brother for an important announcement: the two will lead for the search for the house supervisor or Bisor ng Bahay ni Kuya where the chosen housemate will oversee, command, understand, and get to know the housemates who will enter the house soon. Auditions for the "voice of the supervisor" opened with each housemate must introduce themselves and state their reason why they should be the Bisor in two minutes. After all the housemates, including Aleck and Michael Ver who took part virtually, have made their statements in the first round, the housemates chose four contenders being Zach, Raf, Isabel, and Michael Ver. Later, Big Brother called on the Top 4 contenders for the second round of the audition. Testing their creativity and clarity in giving out instructions, each contender will use their voices and assign a task to a housemate of their choice in the confession room. As this happens, the conversation will be heard inside the house and with Aleck and Michael Ver. Isabel went first, chose Seham, and asked her to show her modeling skills by getting the bananas from the kitchen and hold it while striking a pose for two to three seconds in each of the swimming pool's four corners; Raf went next, chose Gin, and asked her to get Raf's skirt in the girls' bedroom and wash it in the garden area while singing; Zach followed, chose Thamara, and asked her to walk like a model while watering all other than the plants in white flower pots; and Michael Ver went last, chose Nathan, and asked him to "fight" Laziz in the garden area using only his hand and feet for twenty seconds. After the second round, the housemates chose Raf and Zach to advance to the final round of the audition.
97	"Welcome Back"	Days 95-96	January 21, 2022
The search for the supervisor continues as Raf and Zach both faced a final challenge: they will engage in a deep conversation with a randomly selected housemate. Raf went first who chose Aleck, and tackled about his life before entering the house; Zach came next who chose Thamara again, and talked about her life with her family. After the final round, because there was no consensus, it was decided through "bato bato pik" where Zach won and was eventually chosen as the Bisor ng Bahay ni Kuya. The next day, Aleck and Michael Ver returns to the house with a task in store: as they return to the house, they must enter the boys bedroom by passing through the garden area without the other housemates knowing, and fix their respective beds when they enter. Failure to do so will make them sleep in the floor later at night. The two successfully made it, and they surprised some girl housemates when Gin, Isabel, and Thamara noticed them in bed. Soon after, Gin and Seham were called by Big Brother for a special task thanks to Kumunity Decides: they are to prepare beddings and meals for three new housemates as they will stay in the activity area for the meantime. Zach was then given a big microphone as that will be used when he communicates with the new housemates. For this to work, the housemates must hold hands forming one line with one end holding the big microphone and the other switching the on air signage on. As the episode ends, brothers Jaye and Basti were formally introduced, engage in a conversation with Bisor Zach, and enters the makeshift house set-up in the activity area.
98	"Getting to Know You"	Days 96-97	January 22, 2022
The episode starts with welcoming Rica inside the Big Brother house as she was being introduced by Bianca and Robi. In the confession room, Rica was being introduced by Bisor Zach as they have their first conversation together. As Rica leaves the confession room, she sees and interacts with Jaye and Basti who, to her surprised, are also from Italy, and have their first meal together. Meanwhile inside the house, the housemates talked about the way how Bisor Zach conversed with Rica, stirring excitement for Zach somehow. Later, Big Brother informs task leaders Zach and Thamara that, as part of their weekly task, Jaye, Basti, and Rica has to create their third video challenge to which they completed. As the night went deep, the housemates from Italy prepared themselves as they, along with the housemates inside, are going to sleep. The next morning, the housemates both in the house and in the activity area are awake feeling energized for the day. As he interacts with Jaye, Basti, and Rica, Bisor Zach had fun playing with the three housemates making them confused. After receiving instructions from Big Brother himself and conversing with the other housemates, Bisor Zach had a chat with Rica about love and got to know about each other, where the housemates eventually got giddy again for Zach. Isabel and Thamara were called by Big Brother, as they were selected through Kumunity Decides, for a task for the three new housemates: teaching Jaye, Basti, and Rica the dance moves of "Pinoy Ako" they created while inside PBB Airlines at that time, only that they will not see each other physically and must not go through Bisor Zach. From there, Isabel and Thamara with the help of the other housemates teach Jaye, Basti, and Rica the dance moves despite being blocked by the house's walls and having a hard time understanding each other. Moments later, Rico Blanco's "Pinoy Tayo" was played as the housemates at the garden area and at the activity area are dancing alongside each other. After their performance, Big Brother ended their supervisor task, and have Jaye, Basti, and Rica enter the house. Back at the PBB Terminal, four new entrants will be entering the Big Brother house: three Online Bahay ni Kuya winners Kathleen from the Female Kumunity, Roque from the LGBTQIA+ Kumunity, Andrei from the Male Kumunity, and Glenda who makes her return to the Big Brother house as a houseguest after being such on Connect.

=== Week 15 ===
Episode No.	Title	Timeline	Original air date
99	"Hamon sa Pagpasok"	Days 97-98	January 23, 2022
The episode starts with the continuation of events on Day 97 where the housemates were helping Jaye, Basti, and Rica settle down with the housemates, introduced themselves to the new housemates with the three of them reciprocating, danced Rico Blanco's "Pinoy Tayo" again, gave their first impressions, and had their dinner together. After mealtime, Zach talked to the housemates as he thanked them for giving him the opportunity to be the supervisor, revealed to the three new housemates his role as the supervisor surprising Rica in shock, and signs off as the Bisor ng Bahay ni Kuya. Meanwhile, Big Brother got to interact with Jaye, Basti, and Rica separately, and their night inside the house ended. The next day inside, the three new housemates got up energetic, but Jaye was surprised to learn that his loud snoring sound annoyed the sleeping male housemates. As the three new housemates were conversing with Big Brother, a task was given to them where all the housemates are going to have their Weekly Ask live from the Kumu room, with the boys going first followed by the girls doing the Jojowain o Totropahin challenge. By evening, Big Brother gave a task to the housemates where, every time they hear a buzzer sound, four of them will face a consequence by performing what is prescribed on the plasma and will be provided by a ninja. As per previous episode, Kathleen, Roque, Andrei, and Glenda entered the Big Brother house. As the housemates are in the living room, Big Brother was talking to Glenda in the confession room where a mission as a houseguest was given and that her role as such must not be known to the housemates, and a task was being sent for her and the three new housemates. Kathleen, Roque, Andrei, and Glenda all entered the activity area; and Glenda reads the task letter for them before entering the house: they must step on a pathway of 8 pairs of "rocks" where every rock signifies if they can proceed to another rock (represented by a ding sound), or a consequence if not (represented by a buzzer sound) where they and four housemates inside the house will execute the consequence. They can only land on a rock once the plasma TV displays "proceed". They were successful on their first rock, but were not on their second block, prompting the four with Isabel, Seham, Michael Ver, and Thamara to drink a glass of raw egg. The four incorrectly stepped on the third rock, prompting them with Nathan, Raf, Gin, and Aleck to drink a cocktail glass of bitter gourd (ampalaya) shake. They were successful on the fourth rock, but not on the fifth rock prompting them with Jaye, Basti, Rica, and Zach to eat a sliced raw cow's eye. The four incorrectly stepped on the sixth rock, prompting the four to crawl on a muddy rope course while Jaye, Laziz, Gin, and Thamara were showered with mud by the ninja. They were successful on the seventh rock, but not on the eighth and final rock prompting them with Rica, Nathan, Aleck, and Michael Ver to blow a bowl of flour to find a key and must get it using only their mouths.
100	"New Family"	Days 98-99	January 24, 2022
The episode started with Big Brother informing the housemates inside the house the reason behind the buzzer sounds and the punishments they performed, together with new housemates Andrei, Kathleen, Roque, and houseguest Glenda in the activity area. Having completed the challenge, Big Brother have the new housemates and Glenda enter the house, and were given a welcome by the housemates standing by the living room. The next morning, the housemates get to know more about Andrei, Kathleen, Roque, and Glenda. In the living room, the housemates were having fun teasing Rica and Zach as, with Nathan's participation, they exchanged pick-up lines. Later, Big Brother informs the housemates of the outcome of their weekly task by showing the face of Kumu's tarsier mascot Karlito being happy (if they're successful) or being sad (if they failed) on the plasma TV. The housemates witnessed a sad Karlito, therefore failing to win in their third weekly task. To lessen the grief of their defeat, the housemates decided to give their impressions of their new companions: Michael Ver for Andrei, Jaye for Kathleen, Raf for Roque, and Laziz for Glenda. In good spirits, Laziz have thought of performing a Russian rap together with the male housemates. After the performance, Laziz can't help but feel glad for the performance, and the housemates talked about his performance.
101	"The Boss"	Day 100	January 25, 2022
102	"Decision Making"	Days 100-101	January 26, 2022
103	"Isang Daan sa Tulungan"	Day 102	January 27, 2022
One morning inside the house, Big Brother called the housemates to go to the garden area for an announcement where, for the fourth time in the season, the housemates will have another Kumunity to give help for, which revealed to be Isang Daan sa Pagtutulungan, a 100-day series of fundraising activities of ABS-CBN and ABS-CBN Foundation as part of Tulong-Tulong sa Pag-ahon: Operation Odette. After the announcement, Gin and Michael Ver shared they were given help by ABS-CBN when disasters happened to them, especially during Super Typhoon Yolanda on Michael Ver's part. As the company's boss for their weekly task, Michael Ver urged their housemates to come together and collaborate for the affected victims and communities.
104	"2nd Capital Task"	Days 102-103	January 28, 2022
Continuing with the events transpired on the previous episode, Nathan talks to Jaye, Basti, and Rica on the upcoming vote, discussing the speculated secret task of Andrei, Kathleen, and Roque. Later, each housemate were called to the confession room to vote to either keep Michael Ver as their boss or replace him. As Isabel was to cast her vote, she became emotional as she was conflicted with her decision to vote for either Michael Ver or Roque whom she had heard his story a day before the vote. After the vote, Michael was called to bring the envelope containing the winning boss to be revealed at the board room with the housemates. Michael Ver was re-elected as their boss with 9 votes (from Zach, Basti, Roque, Laziz, Kathleen, Glenda, Rica, Seham, and Jaye) against Roque with 4 votes (from Raf, Nathan, Thamara, and Gin), Glenda with 2 votes (from Andrei and Michael Ver), and Raf and Nathan with 1 vote each (from Aleck and Isabel respectively). On a new day inside the house, the housemates had their breakfast. As Thamara was having her breakfast, Raf started washing the dishes when she made a joke about Thamara that made her off-guard. After their time in the kitchen, Thamara confronted Raf and talked about the joke made earlier, patched things up, and reconciled with each other. By the afternoon, Michael Ver gave the housemates an update on their weekly task, with Aleck and Seham providing updates on changes to the t-shirt and bracelet production works respectively. Kathleen, Andrei, and Roque were called individually to the confession room to update Big Brother on their secret task, to which they admitted they had a hard time completing. Later, the housemates went to the boardroom where, from there, they are going to start working on their second capital task. As instructed, the housemates must stack and balance the boxes that spell the word "capital" while getting 10 blue balls placed around the play area. A player will balance with one hand and get the balls with another, and two players will stack and balance the boxes. If the boxes fall down, they must balance the boxes again in order to get a ball. They are given 6 minutes to get all of the blue balls. ₱3,000 will be added to the capital for every blue ball taken. Michael Ver selected Seham, Nathan, and Isabel to do the second capital task, and the group started strategizing. Seham went first where she was able to get 7 balls, totaling to ₱21,000. Nathan went next where, with a new strategy in play, he managed to get all 10 balls in under 6 minutes, totaling to ₱30,000. From there, Big Brother informs them that they will no longer proceed with the third round, meaning Isabel will no longer perform next, as they have reach the maximum capital allowed to add which is ₱30,000. In the end, their start-up capital was increased to ₱42,660.
105	"3rd Capital Task"	Day 104	January 29, 2022
The episode starts with Toni narrating the events of Week 15, starting with the entry of new housemates Andrei, Kathleen, and Roque with houseguest Glenda to the Big Brother house, to their ongoing The Big Online Ten-dahan weekly task. After their second capital task, company boss Michael Ver congratulates the housemates for a wonderful work during that capital task. Before the day ends, Big Brother called on the housemates to congregate at the boardroom where Big Brother informs them that, for the last time, they will undergo another election whether to keep Michael Ver as their boss, or to replace him with one of them. As Michael Ver was asked to leave the boardroom and stay inside the house, the housemates started discussing their decision amongst themselves. In the end, despite Michael Ver's willingness to remain as the boss, the housemates have decided to elect a new boss to replace him. With that, they had their face-to-face board election where Isabel was elected as their new boss with 7 votes (from Zach, Thamara, Basti, Aleck, Gin, Rica, and Seham) against Kathleen with 5 votes (from Andrei, Nathan, Raf, Roque, and Jaye), Seham with 3 votes (from Glenda, Kathleen, and Laziz), and Glenda and Nathan with 1 vote each (from Michael Ver and Isabel respectively). As the housemates return to the house, Aleck turned emotional, and he was consoled by the other housemates. The next day, Isabel shared with Michael Ver her theory on Andrei, Kathleen, and Roque's possible secret task. Later, Isabel started her meeting with the housemates. Moments later, Big Brother invited Celebrity Kumunity Top 2 finalists Alyssa and Anji to serve as consultants for their weekly task, where they get to converse with Isabel, Aleck, and Seham on anything about online selling given their experiences while inside. Isabel would be informed by Big Brother of their final capital task where, as she shared Big Brother's task to the housemates at the board room, will require their creativity, strategy, and swift thinking in creating a "pathway" to get ₱50,000 as start-up capital. After reading the task letter, Isabel selects Gin, Laziz, Aleck, Michael Ver, and Seham who was selected through Kumunity Decides to help with the capital task. Isabel, Gin, Seham, Laziz, Aleck, and Michael Ver started creating their elevated pathway, but conflicts were brewing among the members making their progress much slower, to which Big Brother himself was concerned. From there, Big Brother had permitted them to bring the money balls inside the house, but they must not use them for testing purposes. Overwhelmed with pressure, Isabel emotionally went out to the pool area. The next day, Isabel, Gin, Seham, Laziz, Aleck, and Michael Ver continued with their elevated platform with Laziz taking charge with the engineering works, and the team players now in good terms after conflicts from yesterday were resolved. The team players have completed constructing their elevated pathway, and they started rolling the money ball on their pathway. Problems arise with the configuration of their pathway during the process, and Laziz takes charge in fixing the problems all within one hour. Their strategies were being put to the challenge when the money ball repeatedly falls off as it reaches the P30,000 mark, and the team players managed to catch up. As time was up and the challenge was over, Big Brother informs the housemates that the money ball had reached the fourth turn, meaning they got ₱40,000 as additional capital. With the total capital of ₱82,660, the housemates have won their weekly task. As the episode concludes, Toni announced that the first nomination for the Adult Edition will be held the next day.

=== Week 16 ===
Episode No.	Title	Timeline	Original air date
106	"1st Adult Nomination"	Days 104-106	January 30, 2022
After the end of their final capital task, Isabel held a conversation with the housemates, but a brief altercation happened between her and Laziz. They had their final election for the company boss where Kathleen was elected with 8 votes (from Seham, Gin, Basti, Zach, Jaye, Nathan, Raf, and Isabel) against Isabel with 4 votes (from Thamara, Roque, Andrei, and Rica), Michael Ver (from Kathleen and Laziz) and Glenda (from Michael Ver and Aleck) with two votes each, and Aleck with 1 vote (from Glenda); in addition, this makes Kathleen safe from nomination. Right after, Big Brother announced to the housemates a secret task given to Andrei, Kathleen, and Roque where they must be elected as boss and their failure to fulfill the task; in the end, the latter two are automatically nominated for eviction. After the final election, the housemates motivated an emotional Kathleen and consoled Andrei and Roque. At the dining area, Andrei, Raf, and Isabel talked about the final election, but Kathleen seemed to be disgusted about Isabel's remarks about her win after the latter stated she voted for the former because she only returned from the US to enter the Big Brother house. In the end, Isabel apologized for her remarks and reassured Kathleen for their next challenge. Because of his longing for his mother, Laziz has become more quiet in the past few days and, just before her birthday, emotionally opened up to Nathan about her mother. With this, Big Brother gave Nathan a secret task to surprise Laziz where he brings a birthday cake inside without his knowledge. He asked Michael Ver, Jaye, and Aleck to help divert Laziz away from the house, let Nathan enter, and bring the cake inside. Once completed, Big Brother calls Laziz to the confession room, and the housemates prepped for the surprise. In the confession room, Big Brother gave Laziz time to emotionally greet his mother a happy birthday. Afterwards, he leaves the confession room only to be surprised by the housemates' surprise for his mother's birthday. In another time inside the house, Gin was called as she was given a task thanks to Kumunity Decides. She was asked to guess who is not a housemate, and correctly answered Glenda. Momentarily, Glenda was called as she is tasked to break the news of her status inside by asking boss Kathleen's help. Kathleen called for an emergency board meeting, and Glenda announced that she is a houseguest and will leave the Big Brother house soon, bringing some housemates to tears. After the announcement, the housemates were called for the nomination process to start. Big Brother reminded Nathan that he cannot be nominated after winning the first Head of Household challenge, and Kathleen the same remark having been elected as the last boss and that Andrei and Roque are both automatically nominated. With the first adult nomination proceedings taking place on Day 106, Toni announced that Nathan is safe from nomination after winning the Head of Household challenge weeks ago. In addition, Kathleen was declared safe after being elected as their new boss, Glenda was declared exempted from nominations being a houseguest, and Andrei and Roque were declared automatically nominated. In the nomination proceedings, Thamara was announced as this week's nominee, accompanying Andrei and Roque. As the proceedings were to end, Toni revealed that two of the three nominees will be evicted from the house.
107	"Know U More"	Days 106-107	January 31, 2022
The episode started with highlights from their first nomination proceeding held previously when Thamara became emotional after being named as a nominee and, later, hearing the news that a double eviction will occur at the end of the week. Andrei and Roque, who were both automatically nominated after failing to fulfill their secret task, calmly and bravely accepted the outcome of the nomination. Since their first meeting, Rica has felt comfortable being with siblings Jaye and Basti, and as days passed Rica and Basti have become closer. Later, Basti shared to Big Brother that he knew Rica through social media at first after he answered her question, but doubted she may not remember and he is scared to bring that up to her. He did emotionally recall what made him be in a bad mood at that time: a time he and his mother had an argument, which made his mother hurt. Later, Basti would be challenged to compose a song for Rica to remember the Basti she once interacted with in Italy. While Basti struggles to find the right words, Big Brother consulted his brother Jaye about his closeness with Rica, how Basti asks him for help in wooing his "ex" back home, and how their closeness made it stronger. Big Brother then asked Jaye to help Basti with his musical composition. Meanwhile, Big Brother interacted with Rica about something disturbing to her: the housemates teasing her with Zach that led to her recalling her worst memories, especially being bullied in middle school, going through a time her parents separated, and that her biological mother deserted her. From the confession room, Rica goes to Basti and talks about the housemates teasing her with Zach, and Basti gives her some piece of advice. In the midst of the conversation, Rica spots Basti's song that, not knowingly, is actually for her, and present it to her as Rica volunteers to help. Aside from Basti, Aleck and Rica's budding closeness to each other is also noticeable, leading Basti to bring that matter up with the boys and even to Jaye. Feeling disturbed, Basti opens up to Isabel about what holds him back from opening up his feelings toward Rica.
108	"Battle of the Duos"	Day 107	February 1, 2022
109	"Secret Messages"	Days 107-108	February 2, 2022
Housemates in the beads department continued to make their handmade bracelets as houseguest Glenda asks them about their crushes inside the house. Meanwhile, Big Brother got to ask Aleck and Kathleen along with Seham about their inventory report in their departments where Aleck noticed that Kathleen's notes were messy, which did not sit well with her. At the storage room, Kathleen confronted Aleck about him comparing her notes to that of former boss Isabel, to a point she walked away leaving Aleck and Seham in a locked storage room, and Kathleen returned to open the door for them, leaving the two surprised. Aleck aired his concerns of her to Glenda, Kathleen talks to Seham about what occurred, and Aleck approached Kathleen to settle the conflict though she hesitated at first. Kathleen reiterated that she does not want to be compared and explained she is still rewriting her notes, while Aleck clarified that neither he compared her to others nor say her notes were wrong. Glenda mediated in their situation and Seham recollected what happened in the confession room earlier. From there, Aleck apologized to Kathleen for comparing her with others and hopes she takes the works of the other bosses, and Kathleen apologizes to Aleck as she misunderstood him and settled their conflict together. In a new day inside, Rica asked Aleck about a mystery guy who also has feelings for her. The housemates continued to make their bracelets when some girls teased Michael Ver about Rica; having overheard their conversation, Rica started to overthink. From there, Rica got to air her thoughts on the matter with Big Brother, even sharing that she had trust issues because of her past with her biological mother and on how boys would try to pursue her. Big Brother understood her predicament, and hoped that she meets someone simple, right, true, and deserving of her attention and love. From there, after seeing Big Brother about his concern for Rica, Basti was given a secret task: every day, he has to go to the activity area door, say the magic words "Rica, may tanong po ako..." and ask a question for her where that question can be seen in the plasma TV inside, and Rica must answer that question. From the confession room, Basti asked for brother Jaye's help on his task. After getting their groceries, Basti goes to the activity area door to ask Rica if "she is feeling sad," to which she gave a lukewarm response. Later, Basti returns to the activity area door to ask Rica if "she likes spaghetti" and "likes Korean food," to which she said yes to both. Big Brother then called the first part of his task a success, but reminds Basti that it will continue until the right time that Rica and the housemates will learn who asked those questions.
110	"Duo Battle 1"	Days 108-109	February 3, 2022
111	"Blind Soccer"	Days 109-110	February 4, 2022
112	"1st Adult Eviction"	Days 110-112	February 5, 2022
With the live eviction proceedings held on Day 112, Bianca caught up with the adult housemates; from there, after two weeks of her stay as houseguest, Glenda was asked to leave the Big Brother house. After Glenda was out from the house, the eviction proceedings continue where Thamara was named as the first evictee. In the last round of proceedings, Roque was declared safe from eviction, making Andrei the last evictee for the night.

=== Week 17 ===
Episode No.	Title	Timeline	Original air date
113	"2nd Adult Nomination"	Days 112-113	February 6, 2022
With the nomination proceedings taking place on Day 113, Kathleen, Aleck, Rica, and Basti were named as this week's nominees. As the proceedings were to end, Bianca revealed that it will be another double eviction for this week.
114	"KupiDUO"	Days 113-114	February 7, 2022
The episode starts with the aftermath of Basti and Rica's friendly date where the other housemates were shocked to learn about their date. However, Isabel remained confused because of Aleck's messaging on his supposed closeness with Rica, brewing up a discussion with Glenda and Raf in the girls bedroom. After their date, Basti and Rica returned to the house and both headed to their bedrooms where, both male and female housemates at bedtime, were talking about the date even when the lights are switched off, especially Seham who admittedly has a crush on Zach. This is followed by the aftermath of the second adult nomination where Kathleen, Aleck, Rica, and Basti were named as this week's nominees. Kathleen was a bit emotional and was consoled by Roque, Aleck bravely accepted the outcome of the nomination, Jaye felt concerned somehow when Basti was nominated, Basti and Rica provided support for each other, and Kathleen stayed in the girls bedroom alone. Later, Zach and Seham were called by Big Brother to the confession room to talk about what they usually do on Valentine's Day, were given costumes and a pair of bow and arrows to dress as cupids given their assignment as head cupids, and were given their secret task to ask their fellow housemates by "shooting" them first with a love arrow. After introducing themselves as cupids to the housemates, Zach and Seham shoots Jaye and he discuss about his love for brother Basti and a tumultuous relationship with his parents, Basti sharing similarities with Jaye's response, Kathleen with the loss of her biological parents at an early age, Roque about his family and his partner, Laziz with being in love with a Filipina, Michael Ver about being left out by a girl, Nathan talking about love in a mature way and about hurdling a time his wife had cancer, Raf about being accepted by her secular conservative parents after coming out as a transgender, Isabel about finding happiness after her break up with her boyfriend, and Rica about family love. The cupids were called back by Big Brother, and were asked if who among those they interviewed are most worthy of their help as cupids, and they chose Jaye, Rica, and Nathan.
115	"Love Sacrifice"	Day 114	February 8, 2022
116	"Birthday Doll"	Day 115	February 9, 2022
117	"Love of My Life"	Days 115-116	February 10, 2022
118	"In The Name of Love"	Days 116-117	February 11, 2022
119	"2nd Adult Eviction"	Days 117-119	February 12, 2022
The live episode starts with the introduction of Enchong Dee, Melai Cantiveros, Kim Chiu, Robi Domingo, and Bianca Gonzalez as the "Pamilya ni Kuya" as they make their entrance to lead this eviction night since Toni Gonzaga announced her intention to step down as the main host midway this season. With the live nominations held on Day 119, Aleck was named as the first evictee, saving Kathleen from eviction. On the final round of evictions, Rica was named as the second evictee, saving Basti from eviction.

=== Week 18 ===
Episode No.	Title	Timeline	Original air date
120	"3rd Adult Nomination"	Days 119-120	February 13, 2022
With the nomination proceedings taking place on Day 120, Kathleen, Basti, Jaye, Gin, and Zach were named as this week's nominees. As the proceedings were to end, Bianca revealed that it will be another double eviction for this week.
121	"Express Yourself"	Days 120-121	February 14, 2022
Days before their Love Sacrifice weekly task, Big Brother interacted with head cupids Zach and Seham separately to talk about their respective heartbreaks and their need to mend such. Zach shared his need to give back to his family due to high costs on his dentistry course; and Seham shared about her father where she admittedly violated a particular matter agreed to between her and her father prior to PBB, and her thoughts on what could be their family's response to her move. As a reward for winning their weekly task, Big Brother called them for a "heartfelt announcement" where, similar to Rica's time in the heart center, Zach and Seham will receive heartfelt messages from their family. Individually, Zach received a video message from his parents expressing their support for him; and Seham received her message from her mother, even telling her that her father expressed support for her decision to enter the Big Brother house. Days later, the nomination proceeding took place on Day 120 where Gin, Kathleen, Zach, Basti, and Jaye were nominated for this week. After the announcement, sadness was felt by the nominees, including brothers Basti and Jaye.
122	"Audition Time"	Day 121	February 15, 2022
123	"Rampa Task"	Days 121-122	February 16, 2022
124	"Drag Make-Up"	Day 123	February 17, 2022
125	"Crush Kita"	Days 123-124	February 18, 2022
One morning in the Big Brother house, the housemates noticed five red roses placed in a container next to the magic mirror. After their breakfast, Gin, Kathleen, Basti, Jaye, and Zach were called by Big Brother for a special task: they are to trade their black roses for red roses once they are called separately, and give their red rose to a housemate they want to interact with, and express themselves their way. As the nominees were preparing, Jaye was first called to exchange his black rose to red rose, and give his to Isabel and asked her to talk in the garden area. From there, Jaye expressed his admiration for Isabel as he had a crush on her. Following suit, Gin gave her rose to Nathan, and had a heart-to-heart talk as she was not able to converse with each other seriously. After having an altercation previously, Kathleen gave her rose to Raf and, from their conversation, have strengthen their friendship. Basti gave his rose to Roque, and exchange thankful messages as Roque was the one who gave Basti an emotional boost after being nominated again for this week. In the past few days, Seham opened up to Isabel about having a crush on Zach inside the house; and the moment both of them became head cupids a week ago, they have become close, their friendship have become solidified, and became reassured with each other. As events of this day continues to transpire, Zach was called to trade his black rose for a red rose, gave his rose to Seham, and both went to the storage room where they get the ingredients for pancakes. As Zach demonstrates how to prepare pancakes, the former KupiDUOs had their quality time together where Seham, at one point, became emotional as she does not want to hear Zach saying his goodbyes. After cooking their pancakes, the two continued with their conversation in the living room where Seham has finally shared that she has a crush on Zach. Left speechless, Zach appreciated her courage in opening up her feelings for him. After their conversation, the housemates noticed the smiles in both Seham and Zach's faces, and they shared their experiences from that conversation as they were about to go to sleep.
126	"3rd Adult Eviction"	Days 124-126	February 19, 2022
With the live nominations held on Day 126, Jaye was named as the first evictee, saving Zach and Kathleen from the first round of eviction. On the final round of evictions, Basti was named as the second evictee, saving Gin from eviction.

=== Week 20 ===
Episode No.	Title	Timeline	Original air date
127	"Love Triangle"	Days 126-127	February 20, 2022
128	"Adult Ligtask"	Days 127-128	February 21, 2022
129	"4th Adult Nomination"	Days 128-129	February 22, 2022
130	"Paramdam"	Days 129-130	February 23, 2022
131	"Ninja Feels"	Day 130	February 24, 2022
132	"Wooden Blocks"	Days 130-131	February 25, 2022
133	"Triple Eviction"	Days 131-133	February 26, 2022
With the live nominations held on Day 133, Kathleen was named as the first evictee. This was followed by Gin who was named as the second evictee, saving Isabel from the second round of eviction. On the final round of evictions, Roque was named as the third and final evictee, saving Zach from eviction.

=== Week 21 ===
Episode No.	Title	Timeline	Original air date
134	"Adult Real Talk"	Days 133-134	February 27, 2022
135	"Adult Stay or Leave"	Day 134	February 28, 2022
136	"House Players"	Days 134-135	March 1, 2022
137	"Adult Triggers"	Days 135-136	March 2, 2022
138	"Adult Stand Up Task"	Day 137	March 3, 2022
139	"Adult I Have Issues"	Days 137-138	March 4, 2022
140	"Un4gettable Birthday"	Days 138-139	March 5, 2022

=== Week 22 ===
Episode No.	Title	Timeline	Original air date
141	"Adult Final Five"	Days 139-141	March 6, 2022
Prior to the live eviction proceedings and after nearly a week of bringing mischief and disruption to the adult housemates, Marky and Ja exited the Big Brother house as their time as house players have ended. With the live eviction proceedings held on Day 141, Isabel was pronounced safe from eviction and part of the Adult Kumunity Final Five, making Laziz the first evictee for the night. On the final round of evictions, Raf was pronounced evicted, making Zach safe from eviction and part of the Final Five.
142	"Adult Charity Task"	Days 141-142	March 7, 2022
143	"Adult Trust Issues"	Day 142	March 8, 2022
144	"Do You Trust Me"	Days 142-143	March 9, 2022
145	"Adult I Challenge You"	Days 143-144	March 10, 2022
146	"Last Challenger"	Days 144-145	March 11, 2022
147	"Adult Top Two"	Days 145-147	March 12, 2022
With the live proceedings held on Day 147, Isabel and Nathan were named as the Adult Kumunity Top 2, making Michael Ver, Seham, and Zach as the final evictees of the night. As the Adult Edition comes to an end, Big Brother gave Isabel and Nathan his parting messages as they leave the Big Brother house temporarily. As the live show is to end, Bianca gave a highlight on what's to come as the Teen Edition is to start the next day.

== Teen ==
=== Week 23 ===
Episode No.	Title	Timeline	Original air date
148	"Big Teen Adventure"	Day 148	March 13, 2022
149	"Hello Campers"	Day 149	March 14, 2022
150	"Camping Task"	Days 149-150	March 15, 2022
151	"Fishing Task"	Day 150	March 16, 2022
152	"Find The Key"	Days 150-151	March 17, 2022
153	"Camp Visitor"	Day 152	March 18, 2022
154	"Big Teen Welcome"	Days 152-154	March 19, 2022
In front of the Big Brother house, the live episode opened with a performance from BINI and SB19 with their rendition of "Kabataang Pinoy", the theme song of the teen edition. After spending nearly a week in their big summer adventure, the housemates from Camp Matiyaga were the first to enter the house followed by the Camp Masagana housemates.

=== Week 24 ===
Episode No.	Title	Timeline	Original air date
155	"New Friends"	Days 154-155	March 20, 2022
On this live episode, Stephanie and Paolo both entered the house.
156	"1st Day Hi"	Day 155	March 21, 2022
On their first morning inside, the teen housemates got up from bed with high spirits except for an emotional Stef who, as she expressed to Big Brother, felt insecure because of her acne. She was being given an emotional boost by her fellow girl housemates. Meanwhile, the teen housemates went on to do regular household chores, prepare their breakfast, and had their meal. Right after, the housemates held an open forum on the house rules in the living room. With the entry of Stephanie and Paolo, Big Brother informed the two that they won't enter the house just yet as they will be "going back" to the 1990s. With this, Stephanie and Paolo have to send a message to the housemates in "the present" by recording their audio message using a cassette recorder from a '90s themed task room. After having a hard time trying to operate, they were able to operate the cassette recorder, and record their message. As the two leave the cassette recorder in the storage room, Stef and Don got that and brought it with them inside the house; and just like Stephanie and Paolo, they were also having a hard time trying to operate just to listen to their message. Not long enough, the housemates inside were able to operate the cassette recorder, and heard Stephanie and Paolo's plea for help. With Stef and Don returning to the confession room, Big Brother gave them a task where they have to find five items from the '90s as Big Brother requested, and bring them to the confession room where Big Brother will decide if they get the item right. Once the housemates completes the challenge, Stephanie and Paolo will enter the house. First, Kai and Maxine brought texted game cards or teks to the confession room, but would have to go back to the garden area as they lacked more teks to reach the amount of "10" (as counting of teks are somehow based on the syllables of numbers 1-10 in Filipino). Second was Dustine and Ashton who brought a pager although they were hesitant with their choosing. Third, Eslam and Luke was asked to get a diskette, but brought a VHS player, then a cassette, and lastly a black diskette. Fourth was Don and Rob who brought 5 inflatable plastic balloons and they have to create an inflatable balloon despite Don having a hard time teaching Rob how to make it. Lastly, Tiff and Gabb brought a VHS tape and was asked to define the meaning of "VHS," to which the completed the task. After the task, those "trapped in the '90s" Stephanie and Paolo are being set free, and entered the main house where they were welcomed by the other housemates.
157	"Basketball"	Days 155-156	March 22, 2022
158	"Teens Crush Kita"	Days 156-157	March 23, 2022
159	"Tatsing Game"	Days 157-158	March 24, 2022
160	"Para Kay Papa"	Day 159	March 25, 2022
161	"Basketball Dance"	Days 159-160	March 26, 2022

=== Week 25 ===
Episode No.	Title	Timeline	Original air date
162	"1st Teen Nomination"	Days 161-162	March 27, 2022
With the nomination proceedings held on Day 162, Kai, Stephanie, Stef, Rob, and Don are named as the first batch of nominees for this edition where, at the end of the week, one of them will be evicted from the house.
163	"Like N Dislike"	Days 162-163	March 28, 2022
164	"Thumbs Up Ka"	Day 163	March 29, 2022
165	"Kuya's Executive Assistant"	Days 163-164	March 30, 2022
Kai was called by Big Brother as she will select who among the four housemates with dislike buttons will remove their button where, in the end, she chose Stephanie. Dustine and Maxine were called to discuss about social media to Big Brother, and were then assigned as task leaders. In this task, the housemates must successfully mimic an image through a photo mosaic with 324 pieces of different photographs. That is, when the photos they are taking are set aside, can be successfully seen and correct. They can use any parts of their body to put and color them to help with the image that needs to be formed. Big Brother informs the housemates that, aside from the budget, they will give an opportunity to help a Kumunity to fuel inspiration. As the housemates were doing their chores, they received a message on a big smartphone from KEA; and KEA was being introduced by Big Brother to the housemate. Kai, being chosen through Kumunity Decides, was the first to interact with KEA where she talked about her life in Siargao. Eslam was next in interacting with KEA on his love for technology. In a new day inside, the housemates were informed that Big Brother will leave the house temporarily. This news caught the housemates by surprise. Big Brother clarified that he just has things to prioritize, but promises he won't leave them as KEA will be with them. After hearing word from Big Brother, KEA got to talk to the other housemates, with Dustine going last who asked for help with their weekly task. Moments later, KEA gave the housemates their task where, with 7 players to participate, each housemate has to hit and let 4 bottles fall off the platform in 3 minutes using stockings with a ball on their heads. 10 photos for the pattern will be reduced for every housemate who completes the task. Dustine selected Rob, Don, Luke, Kai, Tiff, Stephanie, and Eslam to play. All but Don completed their challenge, and 60 photos will be deducted for their weekly task. When good vibes was felt after completing the task, some lights, plasma, and big smartphone were switched off unexpectedly, causing panic in the house. Power was restored however, and KEA got to catch up with the housemates. Unknown to them, Robi revealed that the brownout that occurred is a sign of hacking by KEA's scammer.
166	"KEA Hacked"	Day 165	March 31, 2022
167	"KEA Scammer"	Days 165-166	April 1, 2022
168	"Consequences"	Days 166-167	April 2, 2022

=== Week 26 ===
Episode No.	Title	Timeline	Original air date
169	"1st Teen Eviction"	Days 167-169	April 3, 2022
With the live eviction proceedings held on Day 169, Don was named as the first evictee for this edition, saving Rob, Stef, Kai, and Stephanie from eviction.
170	"2nd Teen Nomination"	Days 169-170	April 4, 2022
With the nomination proceedings held on Day 170, Kai, Rob, and Stephanie were named as nominees once again.
171	"School Life"	Days 170-171	April 5, 2022
172	"U Are My Music"	Day 171	April 6, 2022
In a new morning inside the house, Big Brother waked his students up and get prepared; and Stephanie continues to finish her song with Luke's help. Later, Big Brother informs Stephanie that she will perform her original song later on; but, as another challenge, Stephanie will be their music teacher where she must teach her students guitar basics using acoustic guitars. While Stephanie remains busy warming herself up, Big Brother got to talk to Stephanie's father about their relationship with Stephanie, their love for music, and his ordeal having been diagnosed with throat cancer. Big Brother informs him that he will secretly be involved in Stephanie's class. Classes in PBB University has started and Stephanie has to start teaching her student, while her father secretly watches and listens to her. From there, Stephanie starts teaching her students the basic chords in guitar. Stephanie would go on present her song to her students, and shared about her relationship with her father. As class is dismissed, Stephanie's father shared to Big Brother his thoughts on what he witnessed. Big Brother then informed him that, later on, he will serve as Stephanie's mystery online student where she will teach him guitar. Big Brother congratulated Stephanie in teaching music to her students. Later, Big Brother gave her another task: to teach an online exchange student the chords of her original composition. She will not see or hear that online student speak, will only hear that student play guitar, and will perform with her. Stephanie went straight to the music room where, not known to her, she will be teaching the song chords to her dad, the very person she have her song dedicated to. Stephanie starts teaching her online student the chords to which it was easy to catch up. Later, Big Brother gave the time for Stephanie and her mystery online student to perform with each other, to which it was a success. As a reward, Big Brother surprised Stephanie by showing her father to her where she became emotional, and gave them 100 seconds to talk to each other. Now with relief, Stephanie shared to Kai what happened in the music room, especially her being surprised when she was actually teaching her father.
173	"Inspiration 2 Lead"	Days 171-172	April 7, 2022
174	"History Class"	Days 172-173	April 8, 2022
175	"Language Exam"	Days 173-174	April 9, 2022

=== Week 27 ===
Episode No.	Title	Timeline	Original air date
176	"2nd Teen Eviction"	Days 174-176	April 10, 2022
With the live eviction proceedings held on Day 176, Kai was named as the second evictee for this edition, saving Rob and Stephanie from eviction.
177	"3rd Teen Nomination"	Days 176-177	April 11, 2022
After failing to clinch the fastest time on their weekly task, Team Dustine members discussed among each other who to be nominated, and Stephanie, Stef, and Rob volunteered to be nominated for eviction. Team leader Dustine, though hesitant, respected their decision; Big Brother accepted the final decision of the team, making Stephanie, Stef, and Rob as this week's nominees for eviction.
178	"My Sacrifice"	Days 177-178	April 12, 2022
Continuing with events on Day 177, Tiff shared her reflections on her parents' sacrifices, including that of her own as she was the one who cared for her brother with autism spectrum disorder. In her conversation with Big Brother, Tiff emotionally admitted that she resented her mother for leaving all the responsibilities to her just to work abroad. Big Brother got to talk to Tiff's mother virtually to know more about Tiff; in the confession room, Big Brother informs Tiff that she will get to virtually see her brother the next day, and gives her a task to prepare food for the housemates the moment she gets up. The next day, Tiff gets food supply and a uniform for her to wear in the storage room, and starts preparing breakfast. Unknown to her, Big Brother got to interact with Tiff's autistic brother John Bradley or "Jan-Jan"; meanwhile, Tiff prepares food to be sent to Jan-Jan. The housemates got up surprised with freshly-made breakfast, and starts eating breakfast. Big Brother continues to interact with Jan-Jan where, as requested, Tiff must prepare adobo, cookies, and toys for him. Moments later, Tiff's breakfast for Jan-Jan just reached their home, and the housemates and an emotional Tiff watched Jan-Jan eat her cooked breakfast. Later, Big Brother showed Tiff a video of Jan-Jan in her room attending online classes taking mathematics. By midday, Rob and Tiff got to talk to each other with the former appreciating the latter, and shared to Tiff that he has attention deficit hyperactivity disorder as one reason he might not be admitted to the Army. Later, Tiff is given three tasks for Jan-Jan: first was to prepare adobo for lunch with Rob and Paolo's help, to which she will prepare for Jan-Jan the same way as breakfast. In the same way, after having lunch, Big Brother showed Tiff and the housemates Jan-Jan eating her adobo. Later, based on their conversation, Big Brother gave Tiff a task to do a therapy session for Jan-Jan via Zoom with the housemates' help. The Zoom session began with Stephanie and Dustine in doing occupational therapy, and Ashton and Maxine in teaching mathematics. For her second task, Tiff is tasked to bake Jan-Jan's favorite cookies with Eslam and Stef's help to have it brought to Jan-Jan. At dinnertime, they got to see Jan-Jan again eating her cookies. For the last task, Tiff must wrap Beyblade boxes to be sent to Jan-Jan with the housemates' help, while including personal messages for Jan-Jan. After her third task, Big Brother converses with Tiff where he informs her of the three tasks she did as Jan-Jan's three wishes, and the uniform she wore as her mother's working uniform when she worked abroad. Big Brother gave Tiff her mother's letter for her, and reads it out to the housemates expressing her thanks to Tiff for taking on motherly tasks for the family.
179	"Thank You Mate"	Day 178	April 13, 2022
In their sharing, Ashton shared about the sacrifices of his mother being overseas Filipino workers, while Rob recalled to Ashton his mother being an OFW also. Unbeknownst to them, Big Brother got to talk separately to Paz and Ana, Rob and Ashton's respective mothers to talk about their sons, and Big Brother gave them a task where the two mothers will help out together. Later, Eslam and Stef, Ashton and Rob's close friends, were called by Big Brother for a secret task where they must create a pathway using big puzzle pieces with Paz and Ana's help. Eslam and Stef secretly goes to the activity area and interact with Paz and Ana, and started and completed creating the pathway. After their secret task, Rob and Ashton were called separately where, after sharing about their mothers, Big Brother informed Rob of a secret sacrifice task for Ashton to see his mother, and Ashton the same thing for Rob to see his mother. After talking to them separately, Rob and Ashton were called together for the secret sacrifice task where, in the pathway completed earlier, the two must flip a heavy tire weighing 145 kilos from the starting point to the finishing point and vice versa for 37 times as that is Ashton and Rob's combined age (19 and 18 respectively). Later, Ashton and Rob started performing their sacrifice task with the housemates cheering them on in the activity area. After completing 15 flips, Big Brother informs the two that they won't be helping each other, and will take turns to flip the wheel. After a period of exhaustion and some few flips later, Rob and Ashton took a break as needed, and went on with their task as they reached 37 flips. After their sacrifice task, Eslam and Stef were surprised to learn from Big Brother about Rob and Ashton's task where Rob was doing that task for Ashton, and Ashton for Rob. In addition, they were informed that they will organize the two mother and son dinner dates with Luke and Gabb's help, with Eslam and Luke for the fine dining dinner date for Rob and Paz in the task room, and Stef and Gabb for the picnic dinner date for Ashton and Ana in the garden area. Later, Ashton is asked to help Rob prepare for his dinner date with his mom, and Rob got to see his mother Paz and interacted with each other personally. Eslam and Luke then served meals for the two, and they had a dinner date together. As the episode ends, Robi informs that Ashton's dinner date will take place on Sunday. In addition, in observance of the Holy Week, they will be taking the time to reflect in the next few days, and will return for the live eviction night on Sunday.
—	Holy Week Special Programming	—	April 14-16, 2022
The April 14-16 episodes were preempted by the Holy Week special programming from Maundy Thursday to Black Saturday.

=== Week 28 ===
Episode No.	Title	Timeline	Original air date
183	"3rd Teen Eviction"	Days 180-183	April 17, 2022
With the live eviction proceeding held on Day 183, Stef was evicted from the house, saving Rob and Stephanie from eviction.
184	"4th Teen Nomination"	Days 183-184	April 18, 2022
In a new morning inside, the housemates got up and saw the word "#MAJOHA" in the garden area, creating a conversation in the house. This led to Gabb being called to the confession room where, after her talk with Big Brother, she realized something. Returning to the housemates in the garden area, Gabb suddenly remembers her mistake in the earlier History Quiz Bee and, as Paolo and Stephanie said, it emerged as a trend. Later, Tiff and Eslam were called by Big Brother for some news: they will have a head of household challenge through a history quiz. In this challenge called History Picture Quiz Bee, the housemates will race to first in identifying pictures relating to Philippine history. The housemate to get five correct answers first will be the Head of Household for the week and will be immune in the next nomination. In the end and after a tight two-way race with Maxine, Tiff won the challenge and is immune from nomination. Though Tiff may have won, the challenge continues as Big Brother sought for four more housemates proficient in Philippine history. As the challenge continues, Maxine, Dustine, Luke, and Gabb earned the last four remaining spots to be with Tiff. After the challenge, Big Brother announced to the five winners that a special task awaits them, and there will be something awaits the ones who failed. On eviction night, Stef was evicted and sadness was felt inside, particularly for her close friends Gabb and Ashton. With a different kind of nomination proceeding held on Day 184, Bianca informs Rob, Stephanie, Ashton, and Paolo separately as this week's nominees, and their nominations must be kept as a secret.
185	"History Week"	Days 184-185	April 19, 2022
186	"Family Photo"	Days 185-186	April 20, 2022
In a new day inside, as the housemates in both separate groups get up and prepare food, the Tour Group was surprised to see a cake that says "Happy Birthday Kim," stirring speculations in the group. As the Museum Group still express their longingness for their friends in the Tour Group, they grilled Rob in to sharing his admiration for Maxine. In the confession room, Tour Group girl members Gabb, Maxine, and Tiff talked about the cake earlier, and Big Brother informs them that it is for Kim Chiu. As a flashback to the house's history and as part of Kim's birthday, the Tour girls are going to fix their hair the same way as Kim's time in Teen Edition 1, to which they completed. As the Tour girls were fixing their hair, Luke suddenly wonders who were the nominees for this week. Later, another task was given to the Tour girls where, called WWKD: "What Would Kim Do?", they must act like Kim Chiu. Successfully completing this task will reward them the cake Big Brother provided for Kim. During their reflection task in Day 177, Paolo reflected on the sacrifices of his family, his father in particular being a construction worker, even admitting to Big Brother that he resented him for not being with him on most special days. After the sharing, Paolo shared about his brother JC Alcantara to some housemates. Unknown to him, JC Alcantara did enter the house and shared with Big Brother about his relationship with Paolo, and how Paolo would want to help him when he gets inside the house. As a chance to see Paolo, a task was given to him where he must stay with the Tour Group without Paolo's knowledge, and bring the birthday cake from the task room to the garden area. From there, JC got to share to the Tour Group about Paolo. Meanwhile, Dustine, Luke, and JC were called for a task where, just like what Kim did in Teen Edition 1, JC must braid and attach altogether the hairs of Maxine and Tiff, and the wigs of Gabb (given her clean bob haircut), Dustine, and Luke. After braiding their hairs and wigs, JC was called to the confession room while the Tour Group were experiencing difficulty staying together doing regular activities. Later, Paolo was called to talk about their family picture where it would eventually be part of their live human diorama challenge.
187	"Family Is Love"	Day 186	April 21, 2022
188	"Mid Term Exam"	Days 186-187	April 22, 2022
One night in the house, Big Brother informs the Tour Group members of a reward. After earning the most number of points in the History Picture Quiz Bee, they will all leave the house and go for a tour in a real museum as part of their task. From there, as they will leave early, the Tour Group slept in the Kumu room. In a new morning, the Tour Group prepared themselves as they leave the house for a museum tour, while the Museum Group got up to a near-empty Museo ni Kuya. The Tour Group have arrived at the Ayala Museum where they toured around with respected Filipino public historian Mr. Ambeth R. Ocampo serving as their tour guide. After the museum tour, Mr. Ocampo gave his book on Jose Rizal's girlfriends to Tour Group members, and a task from Big Brother for their next challenge.
189	"Final Exam"	Days 187-188	April 23, 2022
After reading Rob's message for Maxine, other Tour Group members continued reading the messages sent by the Museum Group with Dustine reading his own from Stephanie, Gabb from Paolo, task leader Tiff from fellow task leader Eslam, and Luke from Ashton. Right after, they made reply messages for the housemates who addressed them. As the Museum Group received and read their replies, they prepared some ice cream and leave them in the girls bedroom door for them to eat. The Museum Group were called for another human diorama challenge as they will portray the Austronesians. After hearing word from Big Brother, they prepared themselves at the pool area, and the Tour Group got to see Museum Group's human diorama. As the Tour Group got serious in jotting down notes, some of them cannot help but laugh at their act. After the tour, the Museum Group got the chance to jot down what they have just heard from Robi earlier. Later, another human diorama is to be created, this time the 2015 Miss Universe pageant aftermath with Stephanie chosen to dress up as Miss Universe 2015 Pia Wurtzbach. After preparation and some fun time with Big Brother, the Museum Group act out as the Miss Universe contestants. Tour Group erupted in laughter seeing all boy Museum members wearing long gowns and wigs before jotting down information on the event. After the tour, Museum Group followed suit to jot down vital details on the event. Later, Big Brother informs the Tour Group to lend their big notebook to the Museum Group as they are to study for their final examination. After some study time, the Museum group took on their final examination as, with many pictures of history prepared, they are going to select 10 correct pictures based on what they have learned so far, deselect pictures causing distraction, and arrange those pictures in chronological order from the past to the present time. As they continued arranging the pictures, the Museum Group got confused on where the Jose Rizal execution and the Cry of Pugad Lawin must be placed with Ashton confidently stating that Rizal's execution was ahead of the Cry of Pugad Lawin. In the end, the Museum Group complete the final part of their examination with just two incorrect pictures: the Jose Rizal execution and the Cry of Pugad Lawin.

=== Week 29 ===
Episode No.	Title	Timeline	Original air date
190	"4th Teen Eviction"	Days 188-190	April 24, 2022
After winning their weekly task, the Tour Group members returned to the house, only to see none from the Museum Group present. Meanwhile in the activity area, the Museum Group members were chatting with each other as, one at a time, each of them returns to the house and reunites with the Tour Group. First to enter was Paolo, then Eslam, Stephanie, Ashton, and Rob who gives a tight embrace to Maxine. Right after, Big Brother gives Stephanie a special task where each of them will give a message to the housemates with Stephanie going first thanks to Kumunity Decides. After their special task, the housemates went to the confession room, and heard Big Brother's thoughts on their weekly task, especially in learning about history and the past. From the garden area, the housemates returned to the house seeing four scratchcard-like pictures bearing possible nominees. Tiff, being the head of household for that week, was asked to scratch off the gray area using a Big coin one picture at a time. The first picture was revealed, and it was a painting bearing Rob's face that showed up. Next was those of Stephanie, Paolo, and Ashton. After the reveal, Big Brother informs the housemates that the four are nominated for eviction, and one of them will leave the house tomorrow. Emotions were mixed right after. Later, the four nominees were given the time to "leave a good memory that will be part of the history of their stay" by thinking of what could be their final bonding time with the housemate of their choosing. Ashton calls on the housemates as he gives a message to them at the living room; Stephanie calls on each housemate separately as she pens a letter for each of them; Paolo calls on the housemates for a zumba session at the garden area; and Rob prepared a Camp Masagana-themed picnic date for Maxine with ice cream and a song penned by Rob for Maxine. With the live eviction proceedings held on Day 190, Ashton was evicted from the house, saving Paolo, Rob, and Stephanie from eviction.
191	"5th Teen Nomination"	Days 190-191	April 25, 2022
The morning before eviction, Gabb was called as Big Brother informs her that it will be the last chance for her to use her Nomination Immunity Pass, and tells her that she can use her pass for herself or for a housemate of her choosing. After their interaction, Gabb went to the pool area alone to make a decision, while Eslam and Tiff are called for a challenge that would change the nomination process later. In this special challenge, each housemate has five discs—they must shoot the disc to the housemates' container of their choice. If it doesn't, then the vote is considered invalid. They can give multiple discs to the others or to themselves—they are free to choose to give their discs to anyone that they prefer. The housemate/s with the most number of discs inserted in their respective containers will be saved from nomination, while the remaining housemates will move to another round of nomination. After bringing the news to the housemates, Gabb informs the housemates her decision to give her Nomination Immunity Pass to Paolo. Big Brother then informs the housemates that, if Paolo is saved from eviction, he will be safe next week; but Paolo will still take part in the special challenge. The housemates went to the activity area for their challenge, and Dustine was first to perform thanks to Kumunity Decides. Dustine was able to give one positive point each for Maxine and Rob. Eslam went next, followed by Tiff, and were able to give Rob their one point. Maxine was next, but failed to give her points to her fellow girl housemates with two for Gabb; one point for herself was to be awarded, but decided not to give one. Just like Maxine, Stephanie failed to give points for her chosen housemates. Ashton successfully gave one point each for Stephanie and Maxine, but fails to give points for three other housemates. Luke was next, and was only able to give Maxine one point. Rob was next, but failed to give points for his chosen housemates, including Maxine. Gabb was next, but failed to give one point for three of her housemates and two points for Luke. Paolo went last, and was able to give Gabb a point on his first attempt for her. Later, Big Brother announced that Maxine and Rob, after earning three points a piece, are both safe in the next nomination. After the challenge, Rob cannot help but feel relieved being safe from nomination the first time around. On eviction night, the housemates were all in shock and disbelief as Ashton was evicted from the house. Even if emotions have not subsided yet, Big Brother informs the housemates of their face-to-face nominations happening the same night. For this nomination at the activity area, the housemates must use three red discs, two discs for two points and one disc for one point, and give to a housemate for nomination. With Paolo now using Gabb's immunity and Maxine and Rob already immune, the nomination process took place where Luke, Eslam, Stephanie, Dustine, and Gabb are nominated this week. Big Brother revealed that the next eviction will be a double eviction night.
192	"Concert Task"	Days 191-192	April 26, 2022
193	"Target Shoot"	Day 192	April 27, 2022
In a new morning inside the house, the housemates greeted Maxine on her birthday, with Rob trying to give her a hug only for Maxine to give him a hug last. Soon after mealtime, the housemates started working on their weekly task, while Rob was preparing his own cake for Maxine. Meanwhile after having their meals, Big Brother called on the housemates for an important matter: as part of their weekly task, they are given the opportunity to give help to the youth in Bantay Bata: Children's Village. Rob gave his baked cake to Maxine as his gift. Later, Paolo and Gabb are informed of their second task called the Target Shooting Task where selected housemates (Maxine, Rob, Eslam, Gabb, and Paolo) must shoot the 10 targets from a distance using a toy gun to form a puzzle that displays the reward that they will get after the challenge: the stage needed for their concert. Once a specific target is shot, the accompanied puzzle piece will slide down, revealing the puzzle. They only have 10 rounds to complete this task. After so many attempts, even banking on Maxine's gun firing experience, they managed to shoot three of ten targets thanks to Rob. With this, they failed in their task, and they will be the ones setting up the stage in time for the concert. After their task, Maxine was called for Big Brother's birthday cake and her father's birthday message for her. Back inside the house, task leaders Paolo and Gabb were informed that SB19's "Mapa" will be added to their list of performances. As the housemates listen to the song, Gabb and Luke got emotional. With Luke feeling the song's messaging, he shared to Big Brother his trouble living his life without a father, his resentment for abandoning him, and on how he would deal these things with his father.
194	"SB19, MNL48 In D Haus"	Day 193	April 28, 2022
As they continue with their weekly task, the housemates worked on polishing their performances, to the extent Gabb continues to review the flow of their performances while at bed. The next day, even as they do their usual chores, they double the time for practice. Meanwhile, Big Brother invited MNL48 members Jem, Ella, and Coleen where they are going to help the girl housemates for the weekly task. During practice, Big Brother played the music video of "No Way Man" in the living room, and Gabb danced along with the song. As the plasma screen changed to the video in the garden area where the three members were dancing along, the housemates got surprised, went outside and watched them dancing in person as Gabb was about to tear up. After their dance, Gabb embraced her former colleagues as her girl housemates came near them. After welcoming the three and later called in the confession room, Big Brother informs the girl housemates that "No Way Man" will be part of their performance, MNL48 themselves will teach the dance moves, and all girls will perform such song. From there, the girls started their dance practice with MNL48. Meanwhile, the boy housemates were doing something to thrill the girl housemates and MNL48. After mealtime, the girls returned to dance training despite Tiff struggling to keep pace with the speed. Big Brother would inform MNL48 that, as they leave the house in time, they are asked to leave something for the housemates before they leave. MNL48 decided to cook and prepare Filipino street food fishballs, and share with the housemates. From there, MNL48 was asked to leave the house; and as they leave the house, Gabb became emotional again seeing her former colleagues leave the house. Later, Big Brother invited SB19 where they are going to help the boy housemates for the weekly task. Inside the house, the housemates suddenly heard a siren sound, and was brought to the activity where SB19 would make their entrance and perform "Go Up" in front of the housemates who turned giddy for their heartwrenching entrance.
195	"SB19 Sinulid Task"	Days 193-194	April 29, 2022
After their surprise performance, the housemates and SB19 got to interact with each other as they head back to the house. At the living room, the housemates performed a part of their original composition, and their rendition of "Mapa" in front of SB19. Later, Big Brother informed everyone present that SB19 will join the housemates in collaboration for their "Mapa" performance. Pablo then shared to the housemates the story behind "Mapa", while Rob asked the boyband where they coined the name "SB19" with Josh responding to his query. Later, Big Brother informed everyone that SB19 will stay inside the house in the coming days. The housemates and SB19 had their first dinner together when Stell played a game with the housemates; as the housemates managed to respond to the game well, Ken struggles to understand the game. In the kitchen, Eslam and Pablo continued to bond, and got to learn about SB19's normal lives. Right after, the housemates returned to practice when they were surprised to learn that they and BINI performed their edition's theme song "Kabataang Pinoy," and watched SB19 dance and sing to the song. After watching their dance, the housemates worked on the choreography for "Kabataang Pinoy"; and when Big Brother halted the practice for the night, the housemates had the time to rest with SB19 sleeping in the task room. In a new morning, the housemates got up from bed and practiced their dance; SB19 brought their daily supplies from the storage room, cooked for and had breakfast with the housemates, and did some household chores. Later, Paolo and Gabb were informed of their next challenge, named Human Sinulid, the housemates and few SB19 members must need to get through the "needle holes" that they must pass through from the living area to the activity area by moving their bodies and lying on the floor while being connected at each other. They must pass through all 9 "holes" to get 9 costumes for the said concert. They must start from the beginning if the human thread is cut. Chosen through Kumunity Decides, Dustine will start the challenge; Paolo, alongside SB19 members Pablo, Stell, and Justin served as spotters for the challenge. After 30 minutes, the housemates started to feel exhausted. Time was running out, will they be able to complete the task?
196	"Big Summer Concert"	Days 194-195	April 30, 2022

=== Week 30 ===
Episode No.	Title	Timeline	Original air date
197	"5th Teen Eviction"	Days 195-197	May 1, 2022
Continuing with the Big KumuniTEEN Summer Concert, SB19 performs their original song "Bazinga" in a special performance. Right after, Dustine, Eslam, Rob, Stephanie, and Tiff performed their original composition "Bahaghari"; after their performance, however, Big Brother informs the housemates that the number of diamonds earned in this performance will be revealed later on. To cap off, Dustine, Eslam, Rob, Stephanie, and Tiff performed SB19's "Mapa" with the boy group joining in their duet. After their performance, Big Brother reveals the results of the last two performances: they earned 49 diamonds for "Bahaghari", and 50 diamonds for their "Mapa" collaboration. Having accumulated 264 diamonds from the Kumunity, they have successfully completed their weekly task. As they return to the house, SB19 expressed their felicitations and thanks to the housemates as they all leave the house. In this live double eviction episode, Big Brother revealed 10 revelations that will occur. With the help of Celebrity Kumunity Final Five Samantha, five of the ten revelations were revealed. First, the teen housemates have two weeks left in their stay before the merged Kumunity will enter soon. Second, the Kumunity Top Twos of each batch will be merged in to one batch after revealing the Teen Kumunity Top Two in time. Third, a revelation that Celebrity Kumunity Top Two Alyssa, in a recorded conversation with Big Brother, have decided to withdraw and give up her Top Two spot due to her participation in the 2021 Southeast Asian Games in Vietnam. Fourth, in a surprising moment, Big Brother names Samantha as Alyssa's replacement and will join Anji and the Top Two Adults and Teens in the merged Kumunity. Fifth, the results of this eviction will be revealed. Eslam and Luke were both evicted from the house, saving Stephanie, Gabb, and Dustine from eviction.
198	"Love and Forgive"	Days 197-198	May 2, 2022
In the middle of the episode, Bianca revealed the sixth of Big Brother's 10 revelations: 10 housemates, 6 from the three Kumunity Top Two batches and four evicted housemates, will return to the Big Brother house.
199	"Deserve Mo Ba To"	Day 198	May 3, 2022
200	"Road To Final 5"	Days 198-199	May 4, 2022
201	"I Challenge You"	Days 199-200	May 5, 2022
202	"6th Teen Nomination"	Days 201-202	May 6, 2022
203	"I Love You Mama"	Day 202	May 7, 2022

=== Week 31 ===
Episode No.	Title	Timeline	Original air date
204	"6th Teen Eviction"	Days 203-204	May 8, 2022
With the live eviction held on Day 204, Dustine and Tiff are both evicted from the house, saving Maxine, Rob, and Stephanie from eviction. With this, Maxine, Rob, and Stephanie will join Paolo and Gabb to complete the list of the Teen Kumunity Final Five.
—	Halalan 2022 Special Coverage	—	May 9, 2022
The May 9 episode was preempted by the Halalan 2022 Special Coverage on May 9.
206	"Camping Adventure"	Days 204-205	May 10, 2022
207	"Diamond Challenge"	Day 206	May 11, 2022
208	"Big Comeback"	Days 207-208	May 12, 2022
209	"Pole Throw Battle"	Day 208	May 13, 2022
210	"Teen Top 2"	Days 209-210	May 14, 2022
The live Teen Kumunity Top 2 reveal held on Day 210, the last eviction night for the Teen Edition. Before the Top 2 reveal, Paolo was named as the first evictee for the night and exited the house. Later, Rob and Gabb were named as the Teen Kumunity Top 2, and Maxine and Stephanie were evicted from the house. However, during their final conversation with Big Brother, the two young ladies were informed that they will not leave the house yet. The two were informed that they will stay inside the house, and will face the wildcards from the Celebrity and Adult Kumunities with more challenges for a chance to be part of the Biga-10 Housemates.

== Biga-10 ==
=== Week 32 ===
Episode No.	Title	Timeline	Original air date
211	"Biga-10 Comeback"	Day 211	May 15, 2022
212	"Comeback Housemates"	Days 211-212	May 16, 2022
213	"Merge New Friends"	Day 212	May 17, 2022
214	"Bantay Bata Hero"	Days 212-213	May 18, 2022
215	"Baliktad Bahay Task"	Days 213-214	May 19, 2022
216	"Road to Biga-10"	Day 215	May 20, 2022
217	"10th Slot Battle"	Days 215-216	May 21, 2022

=== Week 33 ===
Episode No.	Title	Timeline	Original air date
218	"Biga-10 Party"	Day 217	May 22, 2022
219	"Pangarap Ilalaban"	Days 217-218	May 23, 2022
220	"2nd Kumunitest"	Days 219-220	May 24, 2022
221	"Finish Strong"	Day 220	May 25, 2022
222	"Most Deserving"	Days 220-221	May 26, 2022
223	"Road to Big Five"	Days 222-223	May 27, 2022
224	"The Big 5"	Days 223-224	May 28, 2022
In this live episode before the Big Night, Isabel and Rob were named as the Adult and Teen Big 5 respectively, and join the Celebrity Big 5 Anji, Brenda, and Samantha in the fight for a chance to earn the "Big Winner" title. With this, Adult Biga-10 housemates Michael Ver, Nathan, and Zach, and Teen Biga-10 housemates Gabb and Stephanie are all evicted after falling short in clinching the sole Big 5 spots to represent their Kumunities. After their exit from the house, Bianca got to grill each of the Big 5 with tough questions for them to answer, a chance for the Big 5 to give a message to their bashers, and make their case to say they are worthy to win as this season's Big Winner.
225	"Biga-10 na Big Night"	Day 225	May 29, 2022

== Big Homecoming ==
Two-part special post-season episodes are aired since the week after the Big Night where the Final Five of all three Kumunities are reunited inside the house for a conversation with hosts Bianca and Robi to relive the experiences and address the controversies that occurred during their time in the recently-concluded season. In addition, some of this season's hosts portray some of this season's highlights in the "Uber-Acting" segment.

Episode No.	Title	Timeline	Original air date
1	"Teen Homecoming - Part 1"	-	June 4, 2022
2	"Teen Homecoming - Part 2"	-	June 5, 2022
3	"Adult Homecoming - Part 1"	-	June 11, 2022
Bianca and Robi welcomed Adult Kumunity Final Five Seham, Biga-10 ex-housemates Michael Ver, Zach, Nathan, and 2nd Big Placer Isabel back to the Big Brother house to reminisce the moments they entered the activity area with a series of tasks before entering the house: Nathan disguising himself as Policarpio, Isabel being an investigator, and the housemates with house players Marky and Ja inside the house presented through Uber-Acting. In Uber-Acting, a confrontational scene on Zach's birthday in the garden area was brought back to life with Robi portraying as Marky and Enchong as Zach, with appearances from Kim as Nathan and Melai as Michael Ver. In honor of the time Zach had a drink on his birthday, the Final Five shared their embarrassing moments inside with Bianca and Robi, and spin a mini roulette-style wheel to get a shot glass of whiskey either fully filled or filled at half, hence Shot Puno or Half Puno. Isabel shared moments going to the shower while a housemate is inside, and had a full shot; Michael Ver with waking up at dawn unexpectedly, and had a half shot; Nathan about a time he farted in the middle of their Biga-10 weekly task with his adult housemates, and had a half shot; Seham on being drunk on Zach's birthday, and had a half shot; and Zach, apart from getting drunk, on complaining to his mom while drunk, and had a full shot. Bianca and Robi got to grill Zach and Seham on their closeness after their stay, got to ask and talk about their weekly task where they were able to help Gin rebuild her typhoon-stricken home in the end, and Isabel shared that she and Laziz are now neighbors outside.
4	"Adult Homecoming - Part 2"	-	June 12, 2022
5	"Celebrity Homecoming - Part 1"	-	June 18, 2022
6	"Celebrity Homecoming - Part 2"	-	June 19, 2022

Preceded by Connect	Pinoy Big Brother: Kumunity Season 10 (October 16, 2021–May 29, 2022)	Most recent
