= Gregorio Hontomin =

Filipino religious brother

Fray Gregorio Hontomin O.P.
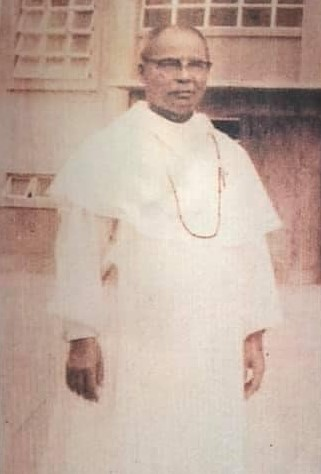
- Title: Professed Religious

Personal life
- Born: November 21, 1909 Savidug, Sabtang Island, Batanes, Insular Government of the Philippine Islands
- Died: June 6, 1982 (aged 72) Manila, Philippines
- Parent(s): Angel Hontomin (father); Anatolia Lima (mother)

Religious life
- Religion: Catholic
- Order: Order of Preachers

Gregorio Andres Lima Hontomin (November 21, 1909 – July 6, 1982), also known as Fray Goying, was a Filipino Catholic religious brother who was the first Dominican cooperator brother in the Philippines. He is currently being considered as a possible candidate for beatification.

== Biography ==
=== Early life ===
Hontomin was born on November 21, 1909, in barrio Savidug in the Sabtang Island, Batanes. He was the eldest of 6 children of Angel Hontomin and Anatolia Lima, both devout Catholic farmers and respected leaders in the island. He grew up in an environment of craftsmanship, including handiwork, basketmaking and building boats.

Around 1930s, at the age of 20, Hontomin moved to Manila and found work in Hospital de San Juan de Dios, a private hospital administered by the Daughters of Charity of Saint Vincent de Paul. It was at his work that he met the Dominican priest that recruited him to be a cooperator brother.

=== Religious life ===
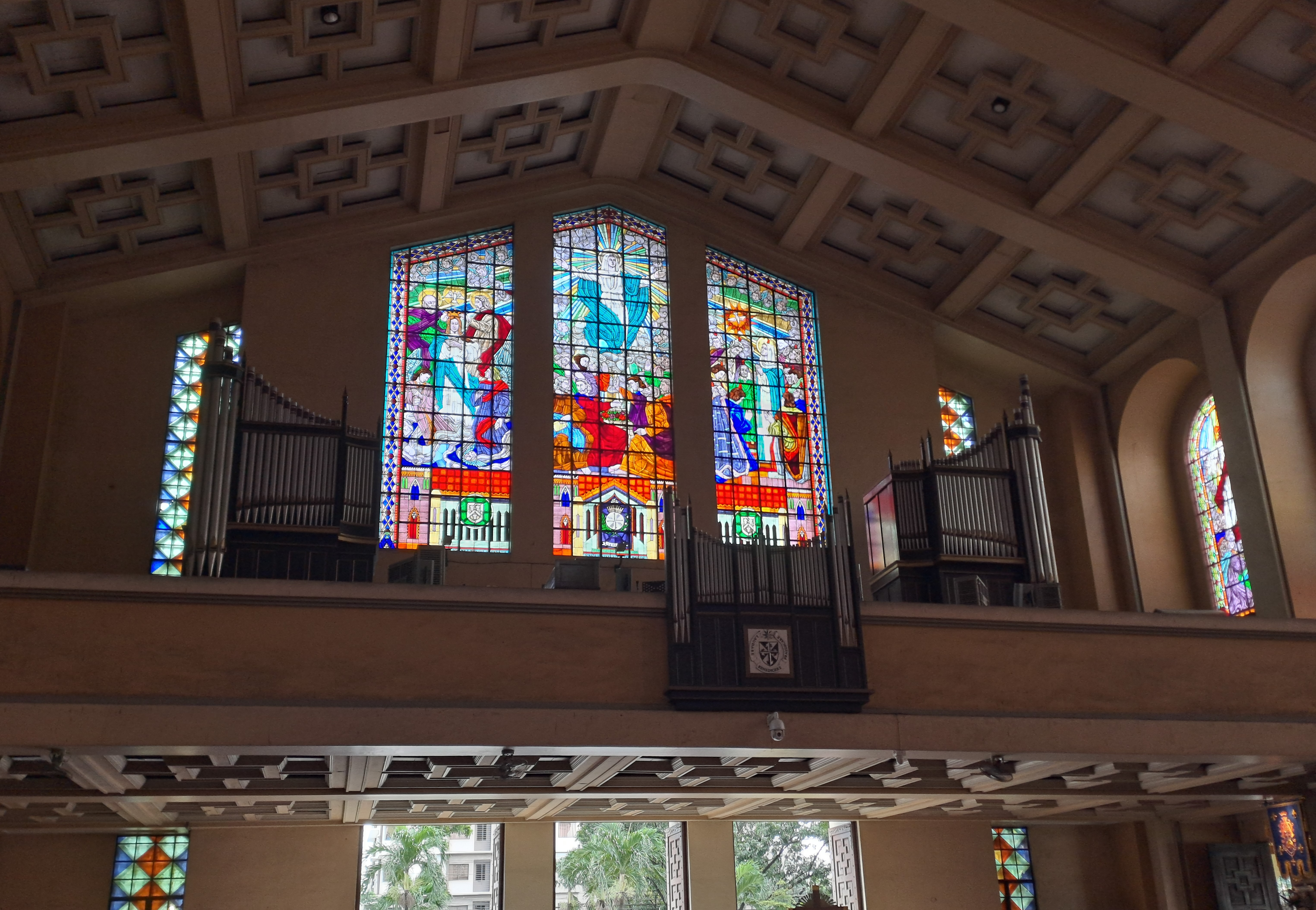
The century-old pipe organ crafted by Fray Gregorio Hontomin is located at the giant choir loft in Santo Domingo Church.

On March 9, 1936, Hontomin entered the St. Albert the Great Priory in Victoria, Hong Kong and was formally received in the Dominican Order the following day after getting unanimous approval from the conventual council. His entry at the Priory, earned him the recognition of being the first Filipino to be accepted in Hong Kong and the first Filipino cooperator brother. On January 1, 1937, he received the habit of a cooperator-brother. He professed his temporary vows on January 2, 1938, and perpetual vows in January 1944. As a religious, he was recognized for his expertise on all sorts of technical and manual work, and his availability in taking care of his sick brothers in the infirmary.

At the closure of the Dominican House of Studies and the St. Abert the Great Priory, the pipe organ that William Charlton Blackett built was later moved to Santo Domingo Church in Quezon City in 1954. Because of Hontomin's creativity in fixing anything that needed repair, he single-handedly reinstalled the pipe organ at its new location. Its inauguration took place on June 9, 1959. Also, in the chapel of Savidug, he handcrafted the tabernacle.

In 1959, he was assigned to the University of Santo Tomas where he worked as the head of the General Services of the University Hospital. At the hospital, he exhibited heroic virtues in assisting needy patients, distributing bread to street children around the vicinity, repairing broken hospital aparratus and providing guidance to healthcare personnel. He was known to have an intense devotion to the Blessed Sacrament and prayed the rosary daily, which he describes as "the direct telephone line to heaven." On May 9, 1977, Pope Paul VI awarded him the Pro Ecclesia et Pontifice for his outstanding service to the Church.

=== Death ===
On June 6, 1982, Hontomin was found leaning on the table after collapsing while repairing watches and some apparatus. He was immediately rushed to the hospital, and around 5 p.m. he was pronounced dead at th

At his requiem mass, the prior of Priory of St. Thomas Aquinas, Fr. Bonifacio Garcia Solis OP, said:

"To the end of his days he was repairing watches and making rosary beads. He was a real, living, vital and charitable 'General Service Department'... [He was] never heard speaking ill of anyone, he lived in silence and humility, prayer and charity, in obedience and in service."

== Beatification ==
Since 2020, the Dominican Province of the Philippines has been investigating the possibility of opening Hontomin's cause for canonization, appointing Fr Louie Coronel, OP who currently is the Province's promoter and postulator of sainthood causes, to take charge of the case. The Dominican Student's Media Center created a short documentary entitled "Br. Gregorio Hontomin" on November 12, 2022.
