= Santo Domingo Church (Quezon City) =

Roman Catholic church in Quezon City, Philippines

- National Shrine of Our Lady of the Holy Rosary of La Naval de Manila
- Pambansang Dambana ng Mahal na Birhen ng Santo Rosaryo ng La Naval de Manila (Filipino); Santuario Nacional de Nuestra Señora del Santísimo Rosario de La Naval de Manila (Spanish)
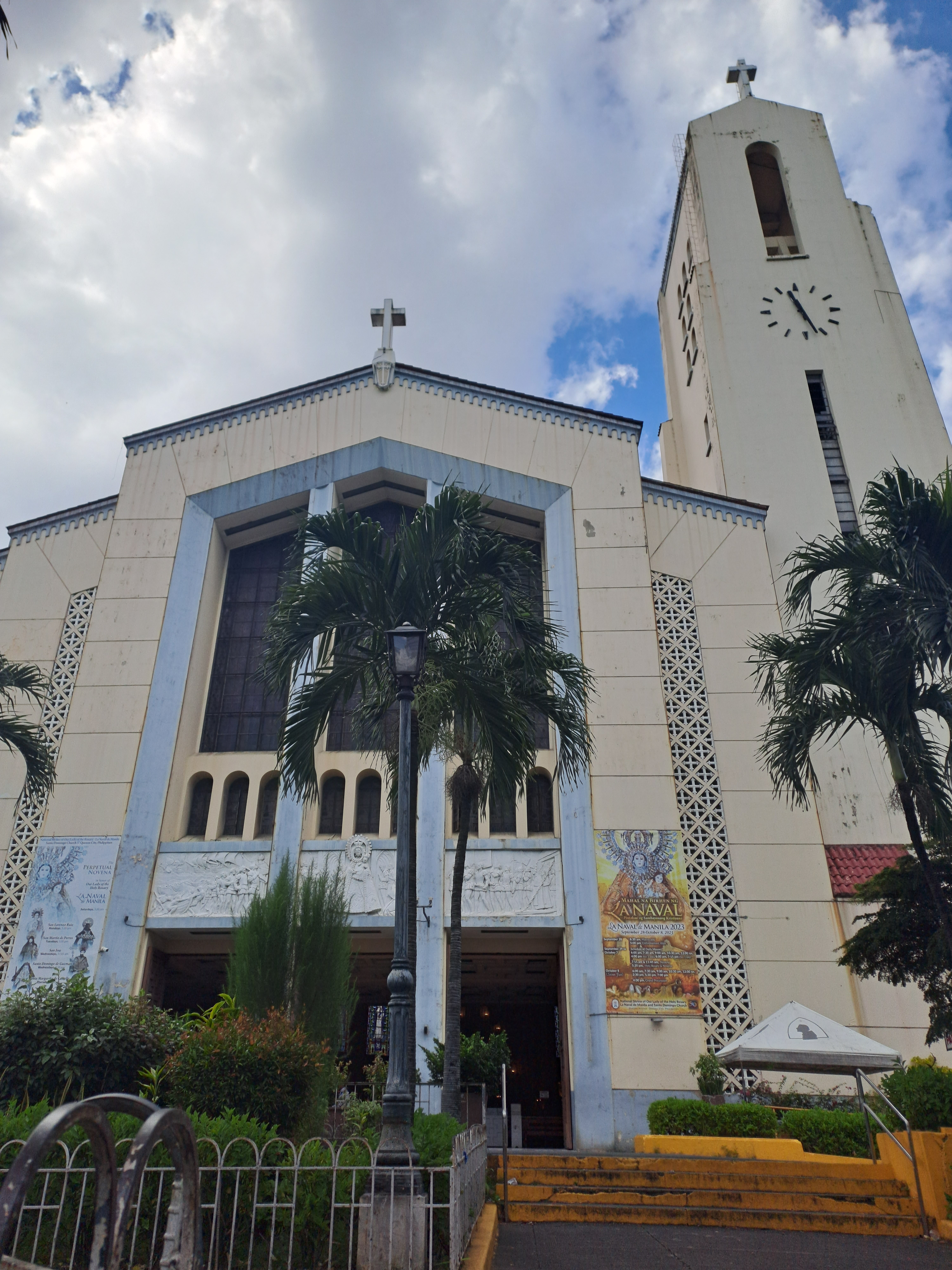
- Church facade in October 2023
- Santo Domingo Church
- 14°37′36″N 121°00′37″E
- Location: Quezon City
- Country: Philippines
- Language(s): Filipino, English
- Denomination: Roman Catholic
- Religious order: Dominican

History
- Status: National Shrine
- Founded: 1587; 439 years ago
- Founder: Dominicans
- Dedication: Saint Dominic
- Consecrated: October 10, 1954; 71 years ago

Architecture
- Functional status: Active
- Heritage designation: National Cultural Treasure
- Designated: October 4, 2012
- Architect: José María Zaragoza
- Architectural type: Cruciform church
- Style: Art Deco
- Years built: 1587–1588 (dst. 1589); c. 1592 (dst. 1603); c. early 1600s (dst. 1645); c. 1692 (dst. 1863); 1864–1867 (dst. 1945); 1952–1954
- Groundbreaking: 1952; 74 years ago
- Completed: October 10, 1954; 71 years ago

Specifications
- Length: 85 meters (279 ft)
- Width: 40 meters (130 ft)
- Height: 25 meters (82 ft)
- Materials: Reinforced concrete

Administration
- Province: Manila
- Diocese: Cubao
- Deanery: San Pedro Bautista
- Parish: Santo Domingo

Clergy
- Rector: Fr. Winston Ferdinand Roman F. Cabading, O.P.
- Priest(s): Fr. Simon Peter D.L. Ramos, O.P. (Parish Priest)

Santo Domingo Church, formally known as the National Shrine of Our Lady of the Holy Rosary of La Naval de Manila, is a Roman Catholic parish church and national shrine in Quezon City, Metro Manila in the Philippines. It is under the jurisdiction of the Diocese of Cubao. Dedicated to Saint Dominic de Guzmán and Mary, mother of Jesus under her title Our Lady of the Most Holy Rosary — La Naval de Manila, it was founded by the Dominicans in 1587.

The church complex serves as the motherhouse or headquarters of the Dominican Order of the Philippines. Originally located in Intramuros in the city of Manila, the church was transferred to its present location in Quezon City after the ravage and destruction during the Liberation of Manila in the Second World War.

== History ==
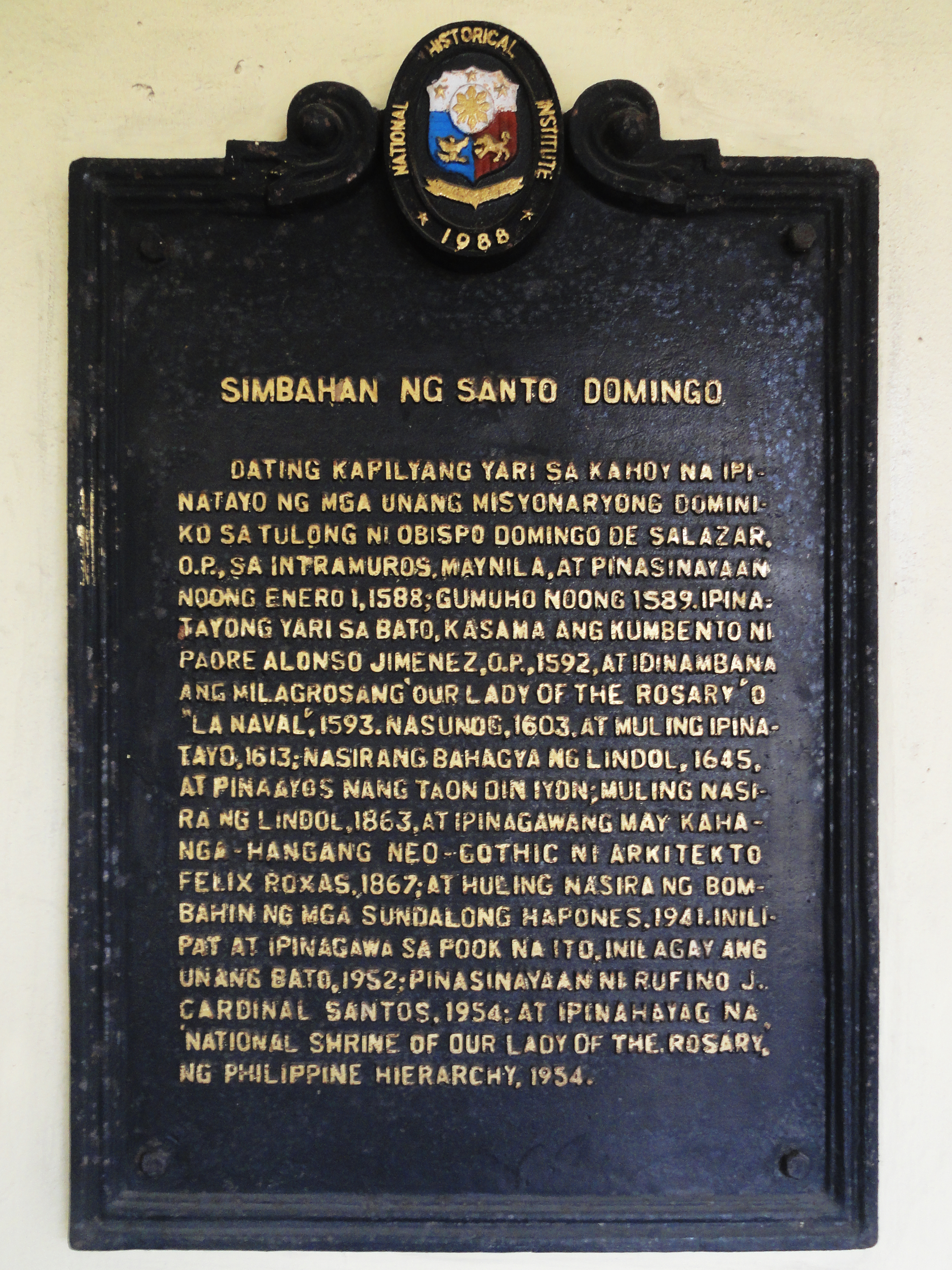
Church NHI historical marker installed in 1988

The first Catholic missionaries to arrive in Manila were Spanish Augustinians who came in 1571 with Miguel López de Legazpi. The Franciscans came a few years later, in 1578. It was in 1587 that the first Dominicans arrived in Manila from Cádiz in Spain. They were welcomed by Domingo Salazar OP, the first Bishop of Manila. The order temporarily stayed at the Franciscan convent in Manila while some of them were sent north to Pangasinan and west to Bataan to begin missionary work.

Prior to its relocation, the original church in Intramuros consisted of five structures, each destroyed by fire, earthquakes, and lastly, bombardment from Imperial Japanese forces during World War II.

=== First church (1587–1589) ===
Salazar sponsored 3,000 pesos for the construction of the church and 300 pesos for the purchase of land. On January 1, 1588, the church (made of light materials) was inaugurated and it enshrined an image of Our Lady of the Rosary from Mexico.

=== Second church (1592–1603) ===
In 1589, the church was partially destroyed by an earthquake. As the roof had collapsed, the Dominicans decided to build a larger church made of stronger material. Through the direction of Father Alonzo Jiménez, the second church was made from stone. Contributions were given by María Pérez, Captain Domingo Mendiola, and a certain Captain Castillo. The church was inaugurated on April 9, 1592. It was destroyed by a fire on April 30, 1603, which also destroyed a third of the walled city of Intramuros.

=== Third church (early 17th century) ===
Almost immediately after the 1603 fire, a bigger and costlier third church was built. It contained a stone vault as precaution against fire and earthquake; and donations were used to fund construction. Though made of stone, it was destroyed by another earthquake on November 30, 1645, leaving only the high altar standing.

=== Fourth church (1862–1863) ===
A fourth church of stone and hardwood was built. It had wooden arches and wooden posts supporting the roof, thus dividing it into three naves. The artistic interior designs were executed under the direction of Father Francisco Gainza. The church took two years to build, and its structural soundness made it last for 250 years. Initiated by Father Castro, a new façade was planned. Flanked by two towers, it was patterned after London's St Paul's Cathedral, designed by Christopher Wren. Work on the façade alone lasted almost a year. The church was inaugurated on June 15, 1862. On June 3, 1863, it was destroyed by a strong earthquake which also destroyed the Manila Cathedral, also located in Intramuros.

=== Fifth church (1868–1941) ===
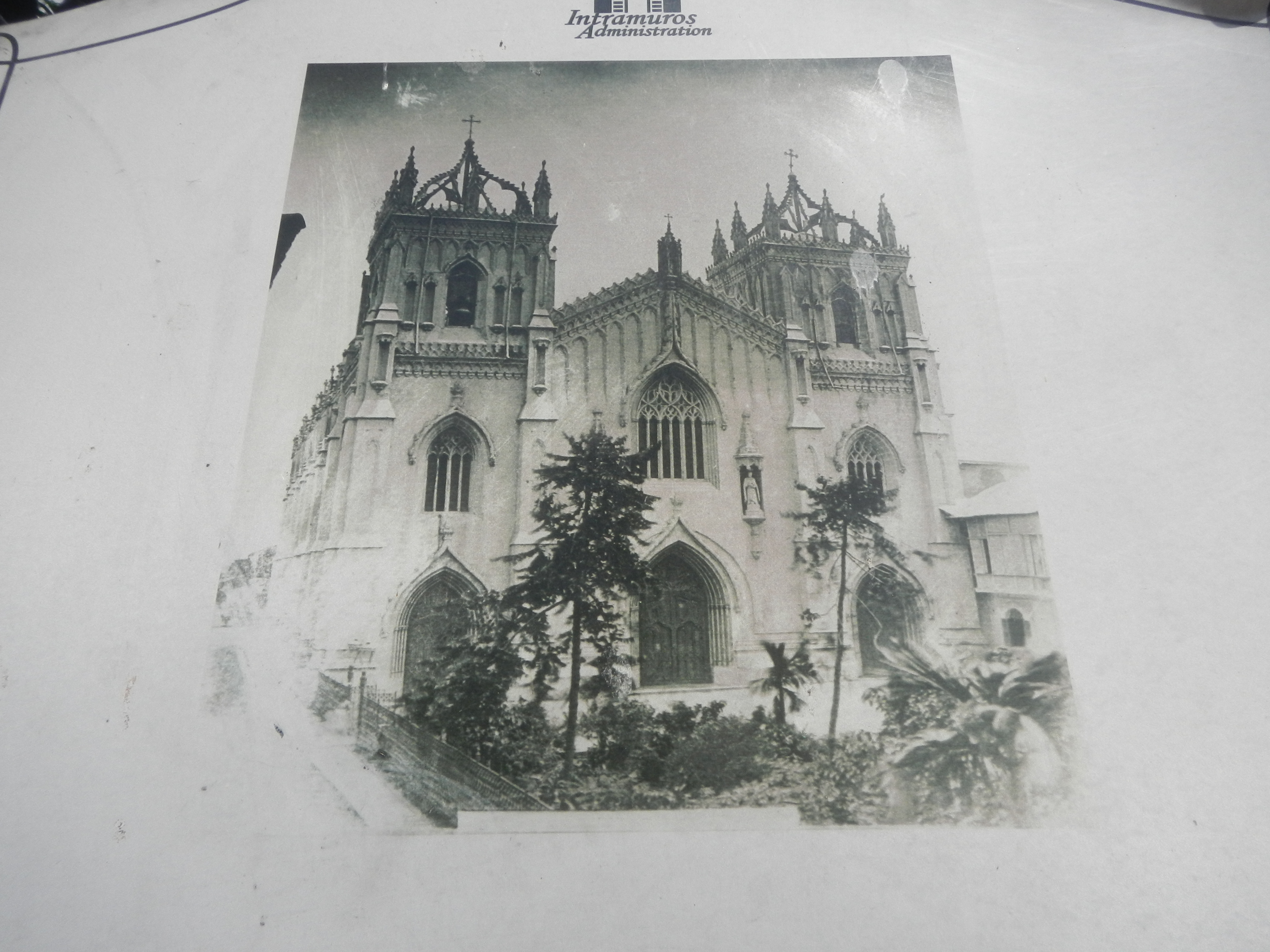
A picture of the original church structure in Intramuros

A few months after the 1863 earthquake, Félix Róxas presented a plan for the church's reconstruction, partly following the plan of the previous church and utilizing some of its salvageable parts. On August 30, 1864, the cornerstone of the fifth structure was laid. In it was placed a lead box, containing art objects, gold coins, medals of saints and other things belonging to the Orden de Predicadores. Construction occurred from 1864 to 1887 in the neo-Gothic style, using Philippine building materials. The immense columns resembling spreading tree branches, were of acle, molave and ipil. The vault was of zinc or galvanized iron. The stained glass windows were ordered from Europe. The four retablos were made under the direction of Father Joaquín Sabater, a professor of drawing at the University of Santo Tomás. Alberoni directed the painting of the main altar.

The church measured 70 by 31 by 22 meters (230 ft × 102 ft × 72 ft) at the central aisles, and 16.6 meters (54 ft) high at the lateral aisles. Its towers rose to 23.3 meters (76 ft). Although Fr. Sixto and Fr. Ristoro would supervise construction of the church, the Dominicans contracted the services of the European-trained architect Félix Roxas, Sr. Roxas, adapting the seismic realities, designed a church with story of stone an upper story of wood. He worked closely with Isabelo Tampinco who decorated the interior with carving imitating the fan vault reminiscent of the English Gothic; the walls and ceiling of the sacristy were similarly treated. Even the furniture in the sacristy was treated in the Gothic manner. The chapel of the Nuestra Señora de Rosario had an altar with lancet arches and Gothic-inspired ornamented pinnacles. Its floor was made of native molave and narra and the pulpit was of fine carving, with the images representing the different saints of the Order. A dove was attached to the sounding board of the pulpit, above which, was an angel. The choir loft was spacious and was protected by wrought from railing manufactured in the Philippines. Over the central doorway, on the roof was enclosed in a glass case original Virgin of the Rosary, which had been there for many centuries. The central altar had three saints. At the center was Saint Dominic, at the left was Saint Francis and at the right was Saint Theresa of Jesus. Above Saint Dominic was the statue of Saint Mary Magdalene. The cupola above had many colored glass windows. Inside was a balcony surrounded by iron railing.

Our Lady of the Rosary had a separate chapel at the right of the high altar. This image was donated by the Governor-General Luis Pérez Dasmariñas and carved by a Chinese, under competent direction. Many persons claim to have secured much help from this marvelous image especially from women, who placed the skirt of the image over their abdomen during their difficult delivery. It was recorded that this image saved the island during the Dutch invasions of 1646 and that on October 5, 1907, it was canonically crowned. Its ivory hands and face, costly garments and crown were very artistic. Saint Dominic was at the left of the image, kneeling and receiving a rosary, while at the right was Saint Catherine of Siena. In the same chapel, there were two more lofty altars. The one at the right, was dedicated to Saint Vincent Ferrer, and the other on the left, to the Holy Family. In this chapel, the interesting historical canvas, painted in Rome in 1909, represented the priest, Saint Dominic, baptizing a Chinese while the two other natives stand watching him. Near this chapel was the sacristy in which were the chests of camagon with their fine carvings. These chests contained the costly vestments of the priests. A big crucifix was at one end of the hall near a stairway leading to the monastery. Below this image there was a half-length portrait of the Virgin Dolores. On the walls of sacristy, there were canvases of interest and value from a religious standpoint. There were four more altars in the main church. The two on the left were dedicated to the Immaculate Conception and Saint Thomas respectively; the two on the right to Our Savior and to Saint Joseph. Below the Crucifix was the "Santo Sepulcro" which could be seen thru the glass cover. From the lofty ceiling of the church, there were costly and heavy chandeliers, and on the lateral walls, there were images carved in wood, showing the different stages of the life of Christ.

The church incurred damage over time and was repaired. In 1887, the vault and the rose windows of batikuling were restored. The main altar was almost totally renovated, and the columns repaired. The roof of the bell towers was renovated to assume a crown-like form.

On December 27, 1941, this incarnation of the church, as well as the monastery beside it, was destroyed at the advent of the Second World War. This was the first church to be ruined during the Pacific War. The friars, archives, the image of Our Lady of the Holy Rosary of La Naval and other movable property like ivory statues, gala vestments of the Virgin; jewelry, and sacred vessels were the only survivors of the war. The image was transferred to Santísimo Rosario Church at the University of Santo Tomás (UST) in España, Manila. The ruins were subsequently demolished. The site is now a financial hub with occupants including Bank of the Philippine Islands, with a historical marker reminding visitors of what used to stand on the site.

=== Sixth and current church (1954–present) ===
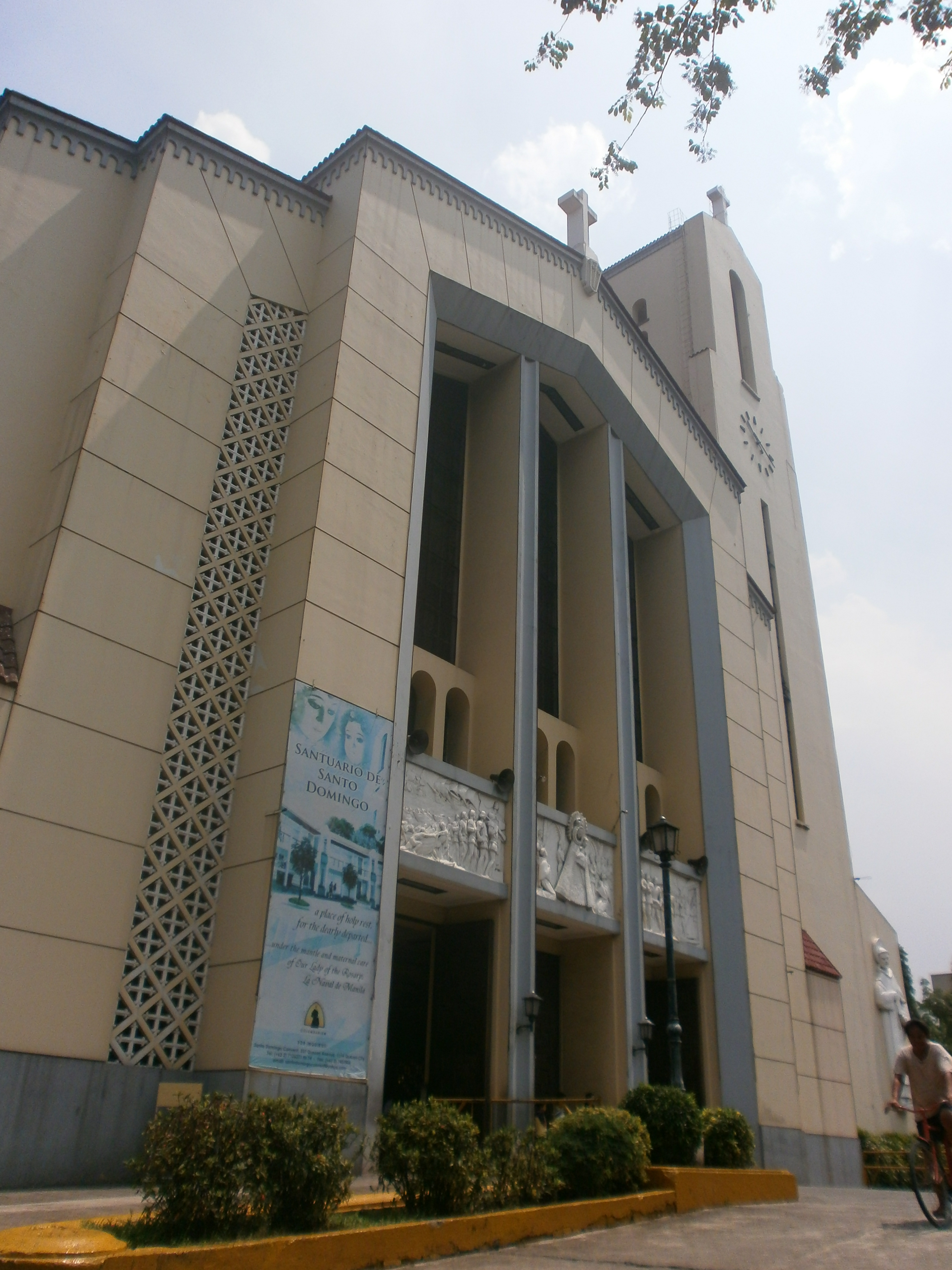
Façade of the sixth church structure, designed by José María Zaragoza

After the Second World War, the Dominicans constructed the sixth church in a new location. They built it on a portion of land they had purchased in Quezon City. The Dominicans commissioned José María Zaragoza to design the building while he was still a student of architecture at the University of Santo Tomas. Construction began in 1952 and was inaugurated on October 12, 1954. During the first few days of the new church, three boys playing on the grounds of the church were seen and recruited them by then Prior of the church, Fr. Pedro Tejeron, O.P. They were 13-year-old Augustus C.A. Feria, his brother 11-year-old Victory A. Feria and their nephew, 11-year-old Vicente F. Sison. On another note, Edilberto P. Feria and his brother, Reynaldo P. Feria joined the first Tiple of the Santo Domingo Church.

The icon of Our Lady of La Naval, previously enshrined at the University of Santo Tomas after the original Intramuros church was destroyed, was brought to the new church in 1957 in a procession.

On February 23, 1972, the church was established as a parish church.

The Dominicans endorsed the designation of the church as a National Culture Treasure to the National Museum of the Philippines in 2011. It has been listed as such following the signing of a museum declaration on October 4, 2012, during the enthronement rites of the image of Our Lady of the Most Holy Rosary — La Naval de Manila. and unveiling of the official marker on December 8, 2012. The declaration is the highest distinction the government can confer on a cultural property. The declaration follows Republic Act No. 4846, otherwise known as the Cultural Properties Preservation and Protection Act. It is the first national cultural treasure listed in Quezon City.

== Architecture ==
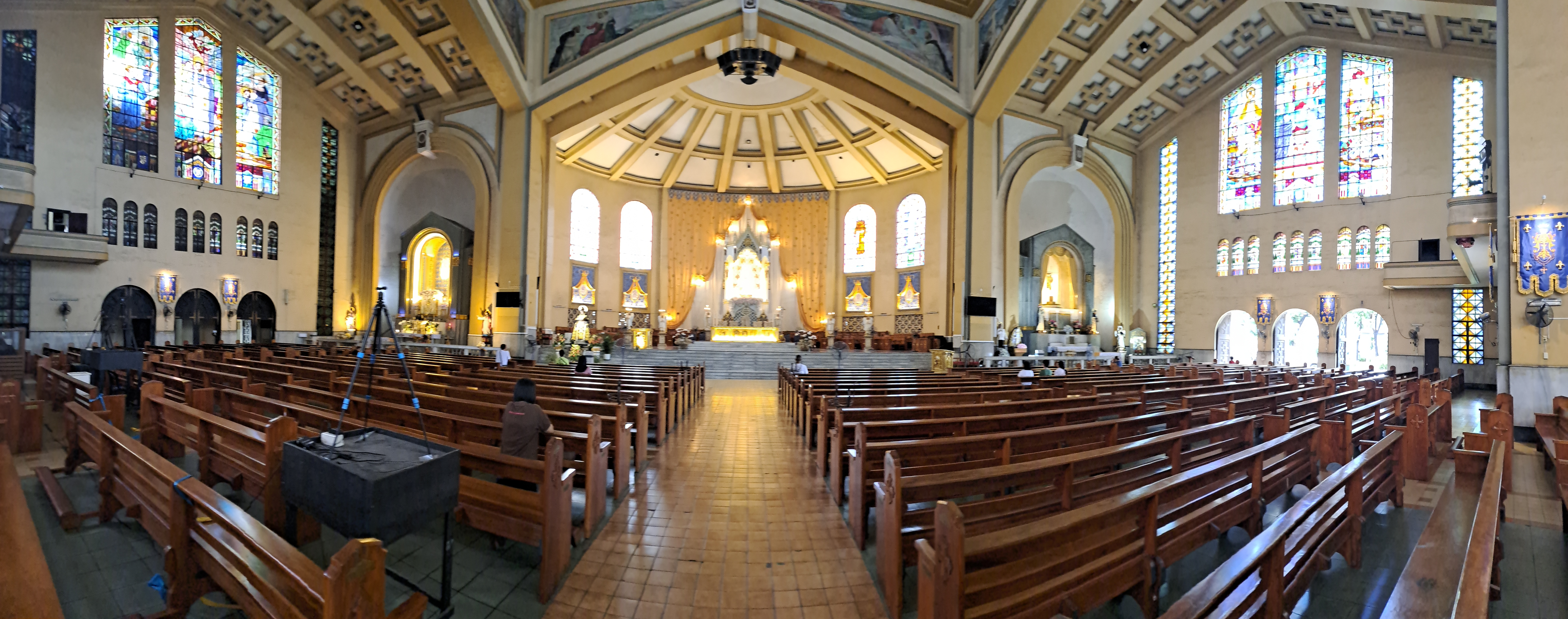
Panorama of the shrine interior in October 2023 with the enthroned La Naval de Manila image

The church was built in the Art Deco combined with Spanish Modern style, which was unlike the Baroque churches built during the Spanish period. The church employed the latest technique in reinforced-concrete building. The Mission-style architecture includes Romanesque and Gothic designs that accommodate more space. Measuring 85 by 40 meters (279 ft × 131 ft) with a height of 25 meters (82 ft), the church occupies a total floor area of 3,300 square meters (36,000 sq ft). It is the biggest church in Metro Manila and one of the biggest churches in Asia.

The church façade has receding planes with leaves designed in corbel arches. Over the triple portals of the church is a high-relief frieze depicting the story of La Naval de Manila. The giant bas-relief of Santo Domingo was designed by the Italian sculptor and expatriate Francesco Monti.

In the nave of the church there are eight colorful murals by National Artist Carlos Francisco depicting the life and times of Santo Domingo de Guzmán, the Spaniard who founded the Order of Preachers. Francisco's murals are just below the equally brilliant murals of the Four Evangelists in vivid brown tones by Antonio García Llamas.

One of Galo Ocampo's stained class windows

The curved windows of the church are stained glass designs by Galo Ocampo whose bases show different ecclesiastical seals. The windows depict the original 15 Mysteries of the Holy Rosary as well as the Battles of Lepanto and La Naval de Manila; and the martyrdoms of San Vicente Liem de la Paz and San Francisco Capillas, Dominican protomartyrs of Vietnam and China, respectively. Right behind Santo Domingo Church's facade is an intricately carved panels and stained glass windows lie a treasure trove of the Philippines' rich cultural heritage and the object of centuries-old devotion, the image of Our Lady of the Rosary, La Naval de Manila, the oldest Philippine-made ivory Marian icon in the country.

=== Treasures ===
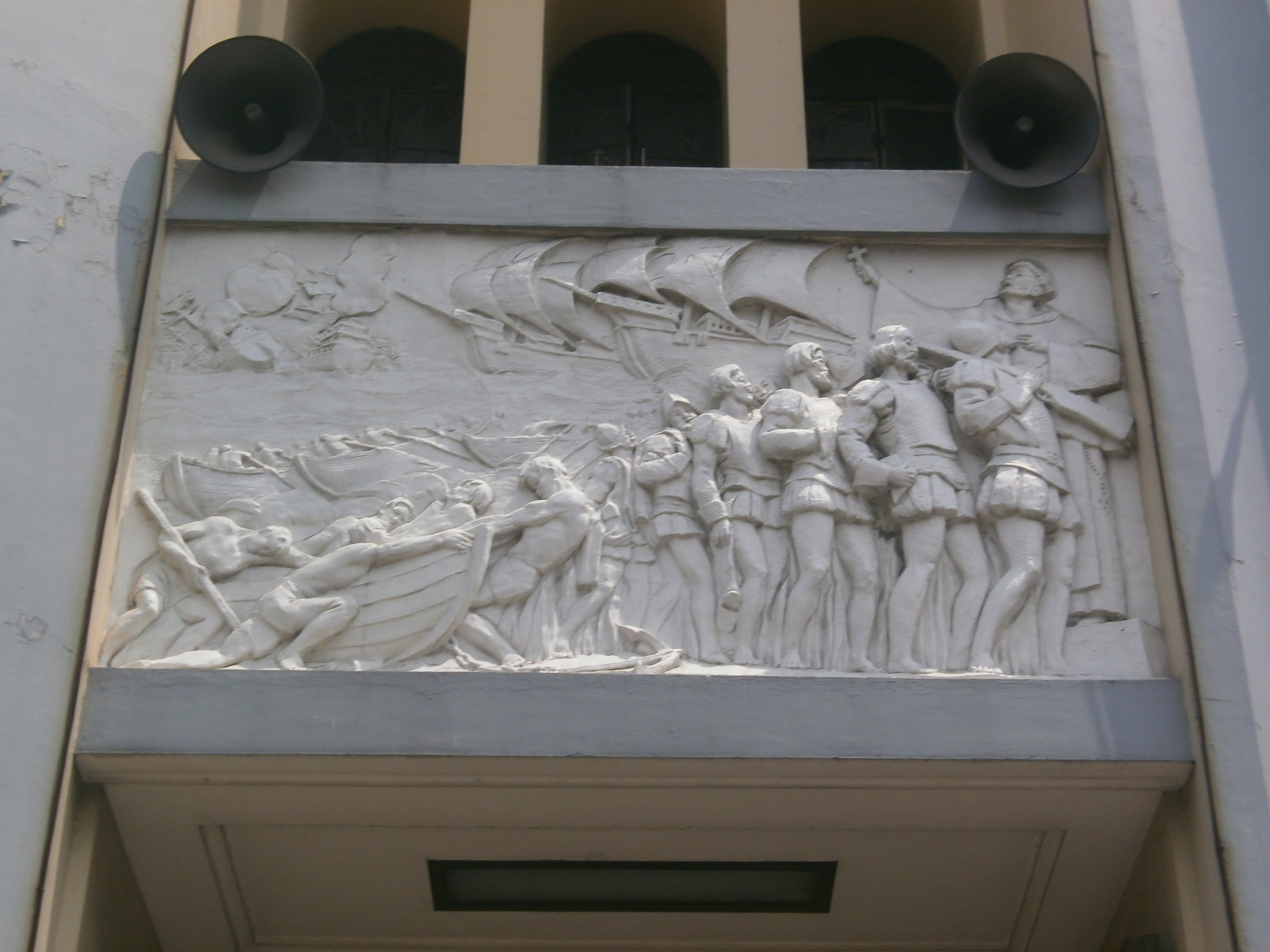
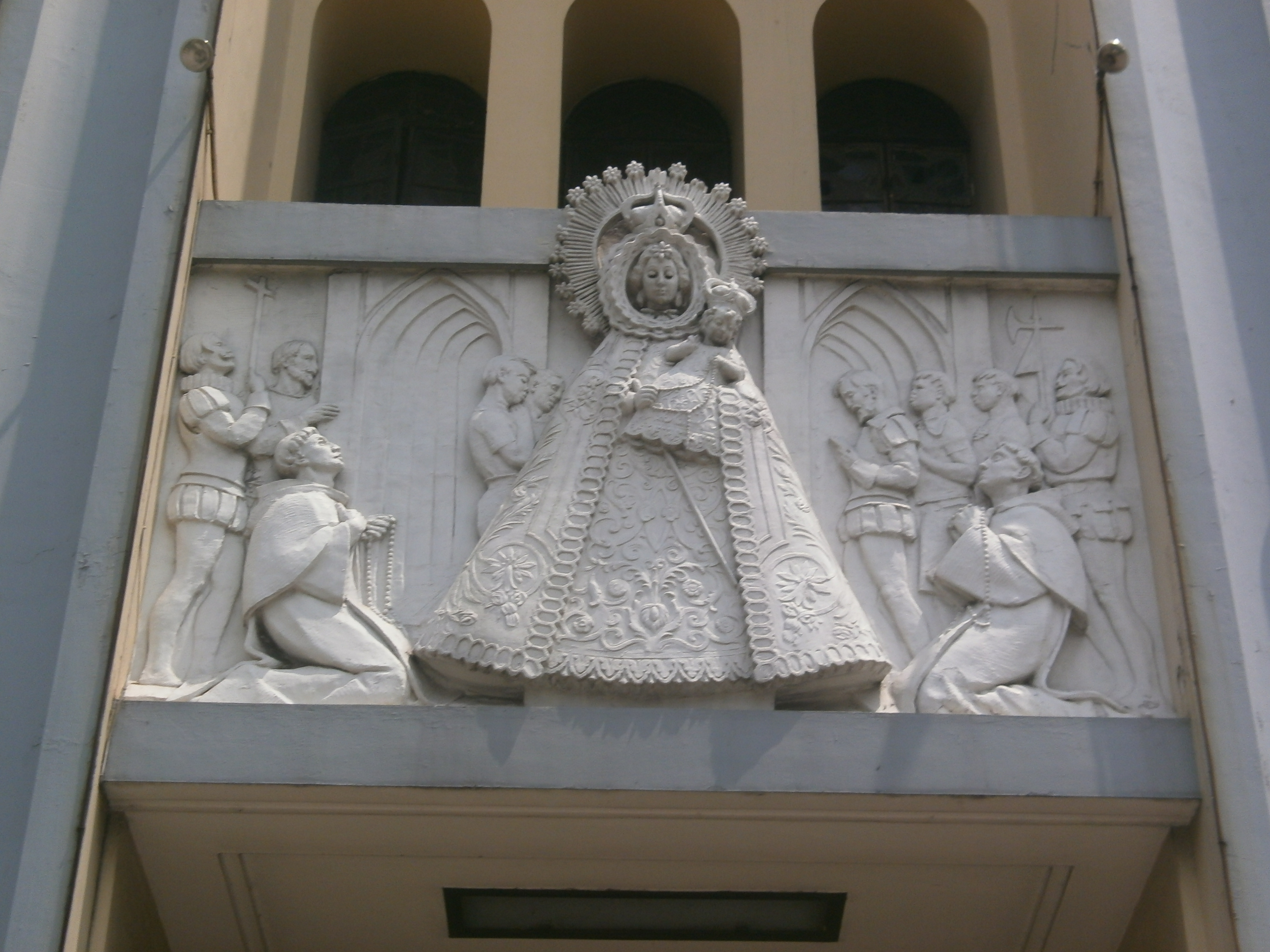
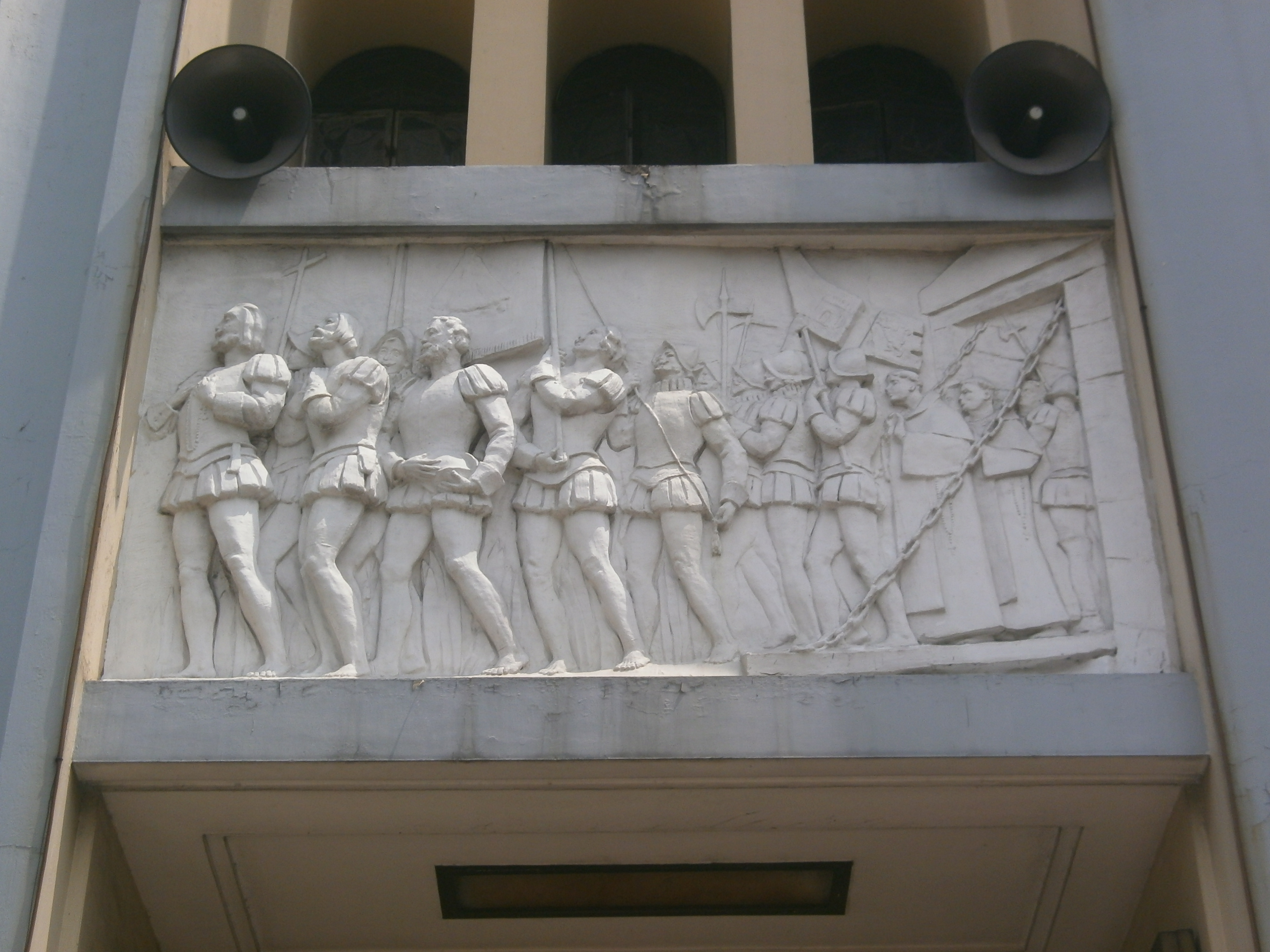
Bas-relief frieze at the facade depicting the story of La Naval

Aside from being an architectural jewel, the Santo Domingo Church houses artistic treasures. The second to sixth Santo Domingos were bound by a common symbol, the image of the Nuestra Señora del Santísmo Rosario, La Naval de Manila. The image of Our Lady of the Holy Rosary is kept on the left side altar all year round, except during the October fiesta when a special canopy and platforms are built for it behind the main altar. The image of Our Lady of the Rosary has been the object of Filipino devotion that dates back to the 16th century, and the icon's shrine in Quezon City is host to an annual feast that culminates in a procession that draws tens of thousands of devotees. Opposite in the left, a side altar dedicated to Saint Martín de Porres.

Devotees of Our Lady of the Rosary would offer her jewelry. In the church's jewellery collection, the La Naval image has a brooch described as "studded with small diamonds, seed pearls and colored gems". It is believed to have been offered to the Virgin by a certain Josefa Roxas Manio, a native of Calumpit, Bulacan, in the 19th century, after having received it as a courtship gift from Norodom I of Cambodia.

Somewhere in the vast church complex is a secret vault holding centuries-old ivory icons and wooden images of saints made by Filipino craftsmen; exquisite, gem-studded, age-old crowns; golden Marian robes; and fine jewelry for the Virgin presented by fervent devotees. The secrecy about the vault makes sense: In October 1762, thieves broke into the Santo Domingo Church in Intramuros and took some of its rare treasures, prompting security of the church's treasures since then. Other treasures that are deemed fit for public viewing can be found in the church's museum, to the left of the church.

Another notable gift is the National Artist medallion, which ardent devotee Nick Joaquin instructed his heirs to donate to the Virgin before he died in 2004. The medallion has been affixed to the statue's foot since then. Stored in the vault, according to the book, are prewar ivory heads and hands for statues of several saints, including St. Dominic, St. Vincent Ferrer, St. Catherine de' Ricci, St. Agnes of Montepulciano and St. Antoninus of Florence.

=== Pipe organ ===
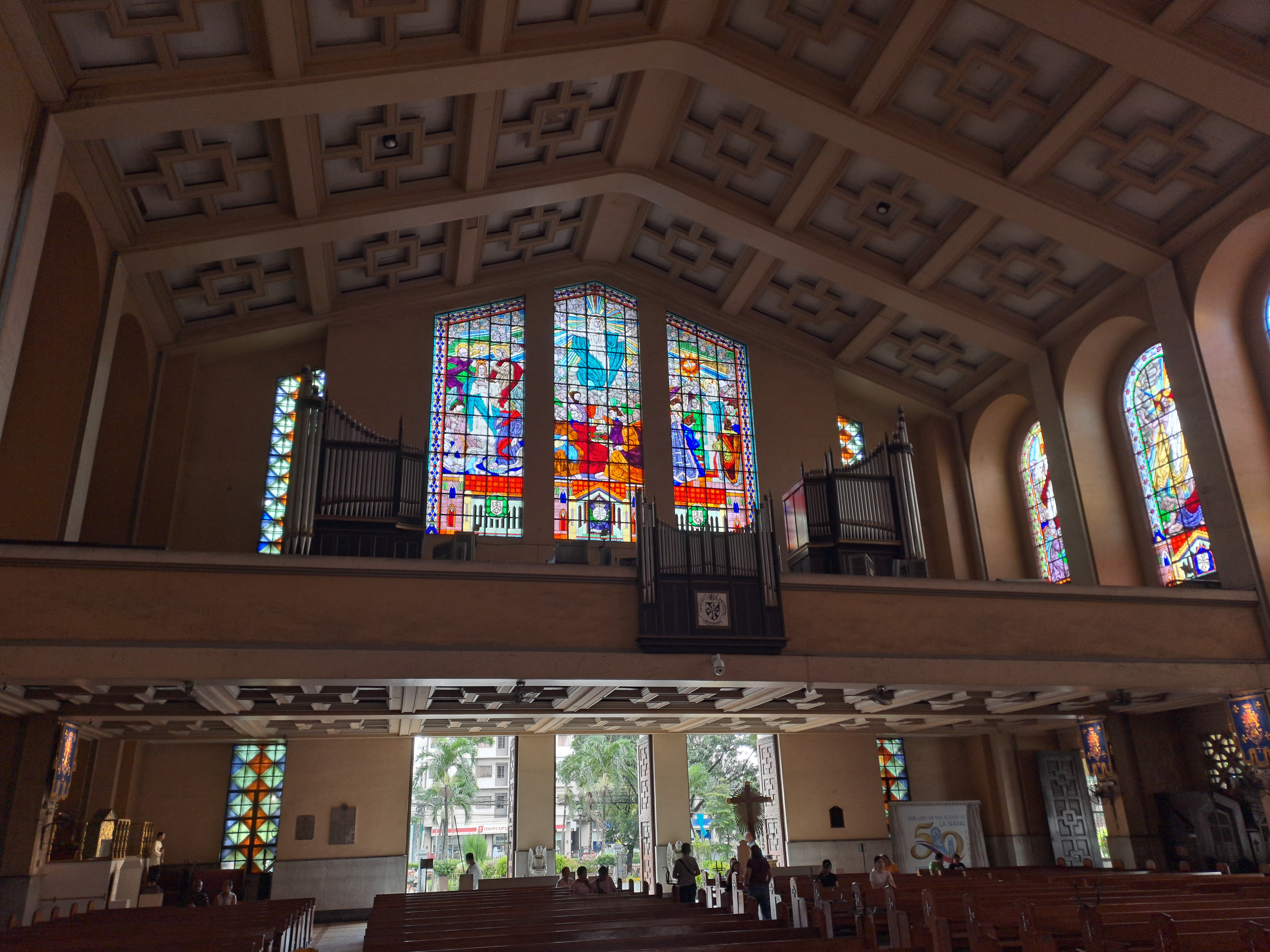
The giant choir loft where the century-old pipe organ is located

In the expansive choir loft sits a nearly century-old pipe organ crafted by Fray Gregorio Hontomin, OP in Rosaryhill, Hong Kong. The Dominicans relocated the pipe organ from Hong Kong to the church in 1954, following the closure of the Chapel of St. Albert the Great's Priory—the hub of religious formation and studies for the Dominican Province of the Holy Rosary. Its inauguration took place on June 9, 1959. Restoring it to its former glory was entrusted to Diego Cera Organbuilders Inc., the stewards of the renowned Las Piñas Bamboo Organ. The restoration encompassed the repositioning of the pipe organs from the edges to a slightly forward and exchanged position, the complete reconstruction and modernization of the organ console, and likely an overhaul of the wind pump system.

== Church complex ==
=== Museo de Santo Domingo ===
The Santo Domingo Museum (also Museo de Santo Domingo) houses other valuable objects—such as centuries-old crucifixes made of gold and silver, rosaries and a tabernacle, all of which had been used in the old church in Intramuros.

=== Columbary and Mortuary ===
The church has two mortuary facilities located at the right side of the church where wakes can be held for the deceased. One is located below the belfry of the church, and the other, at the right side beside the altar and the entrance to their columbary. In addition, the former idle area and storage area of the church, at the rear part of the church adjacent to the altar has been developed to be a columbary, and an interment area. Called the Santuario de Santo Domingo, the facility offers columbary vaults for urns, with sections named after Dominican Saints. The central part of the Santuario is exclusively dedicated to the Order of Preachers, housing urns, bones and interred remains of Dominican clergymen.

=== Café Inggo ===
At the south-western portion of the church complex is a restaurant operated by the church; Café Inggo 1587. It opened in 2017, featuring Spanish and Filipino cuisines. It was named after the localized nickname of the patron saint of the church and the founder of the Order of Preachers, St. Dominic.

The restaurant was awarded the 2021 Travelers' Choice award from TripAdvisor.

== Gallery ==
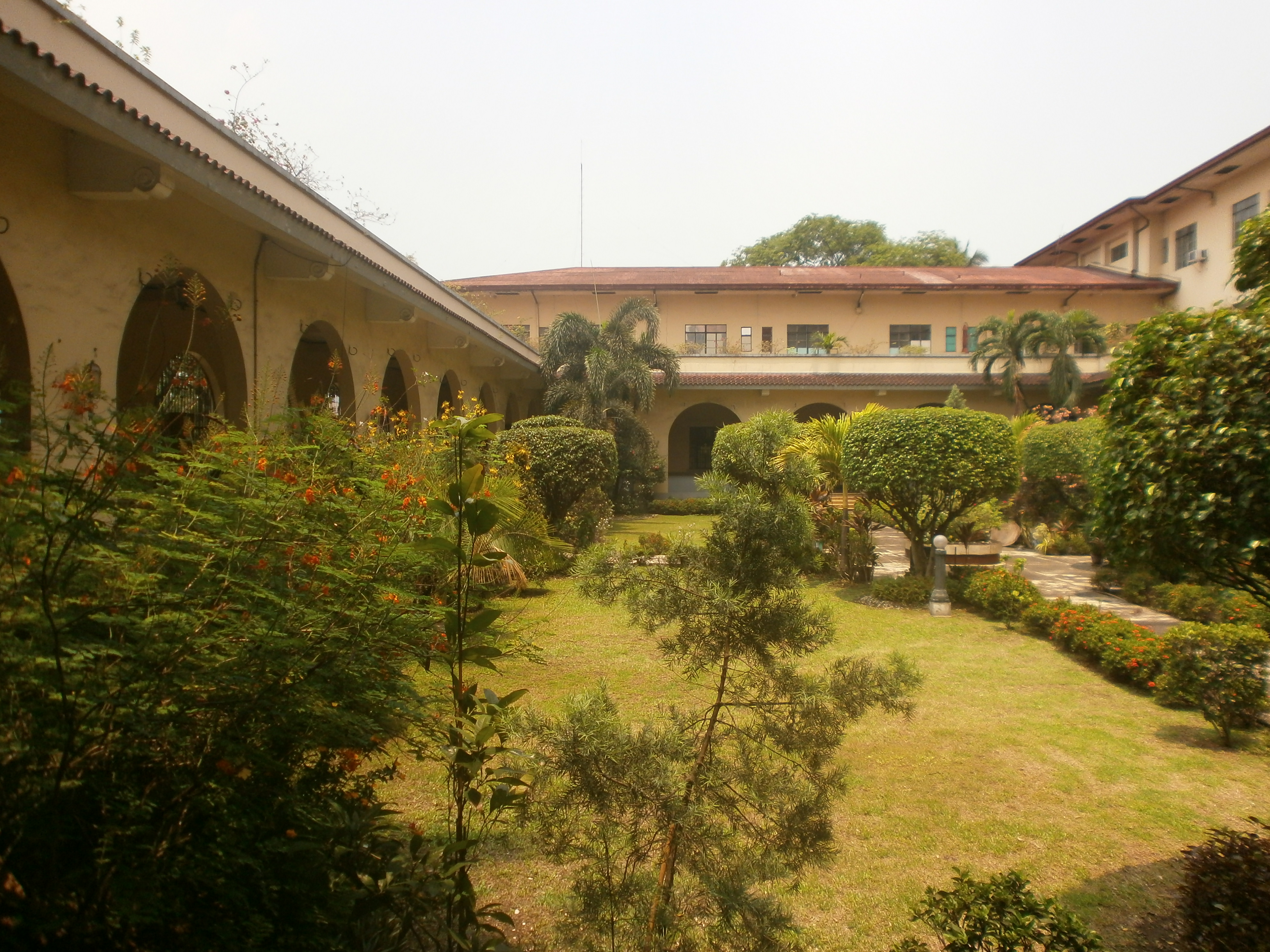
Courtyard and cloister

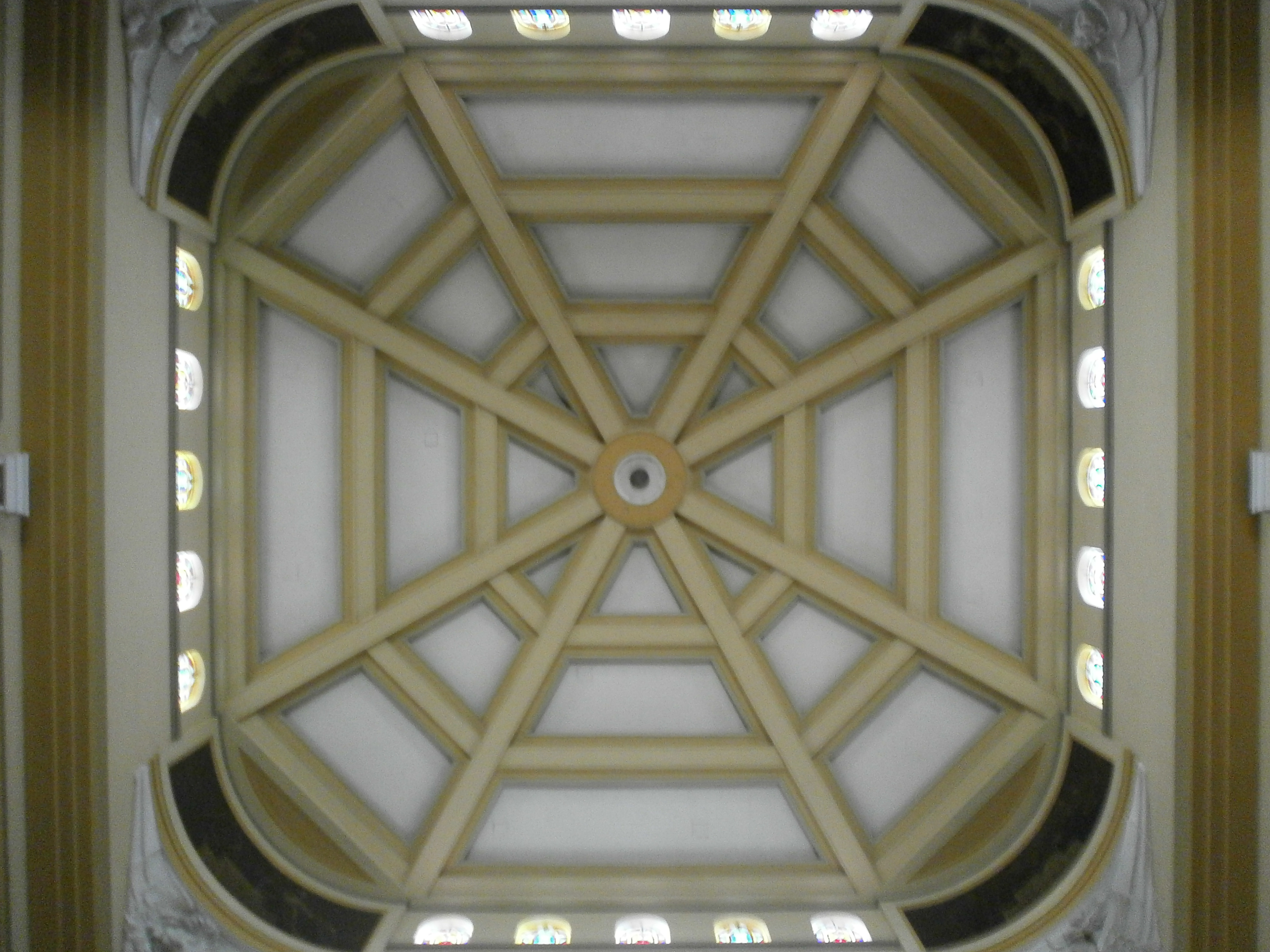
Interior of the crossing

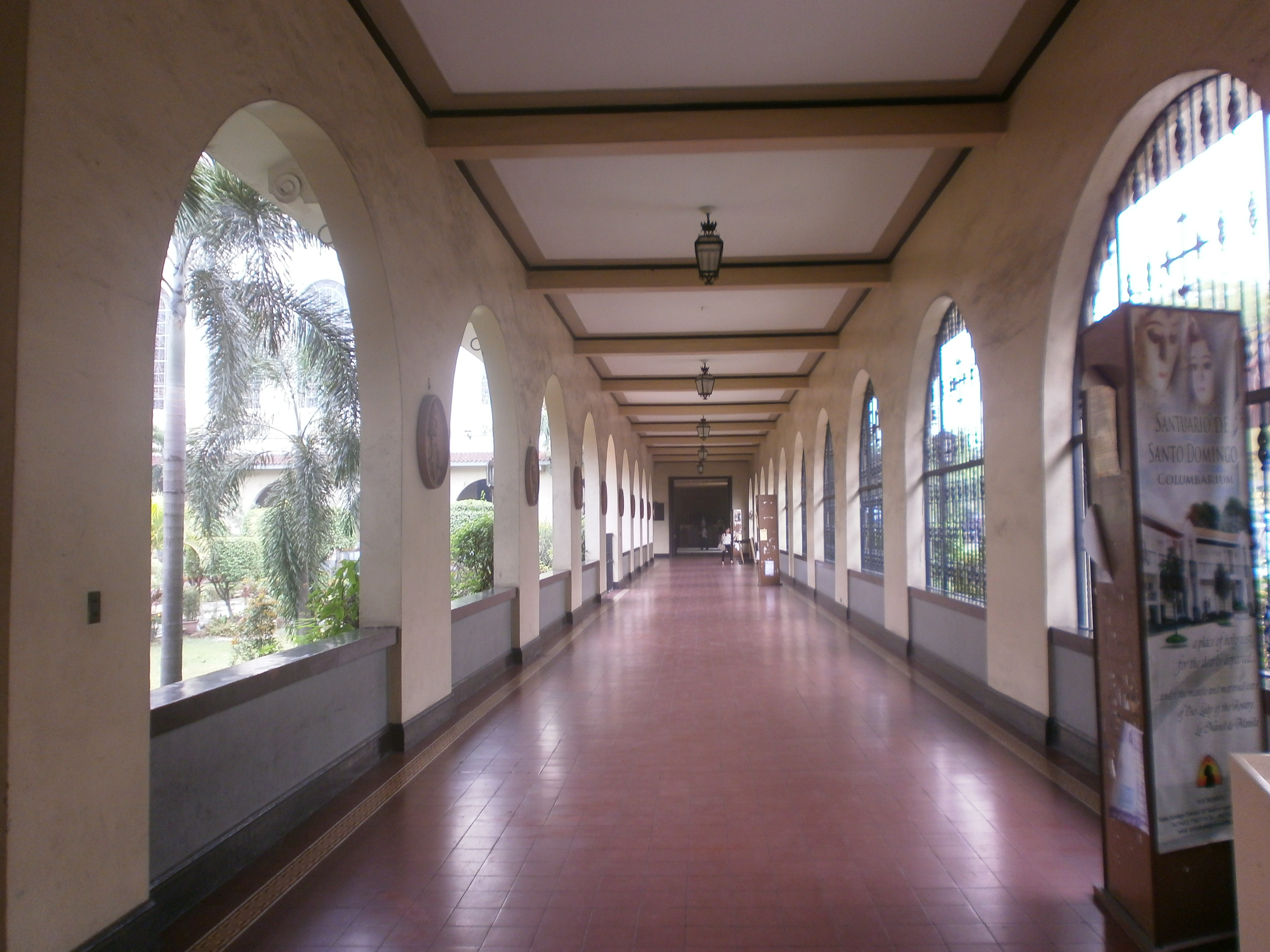
Hallway leading to the convent

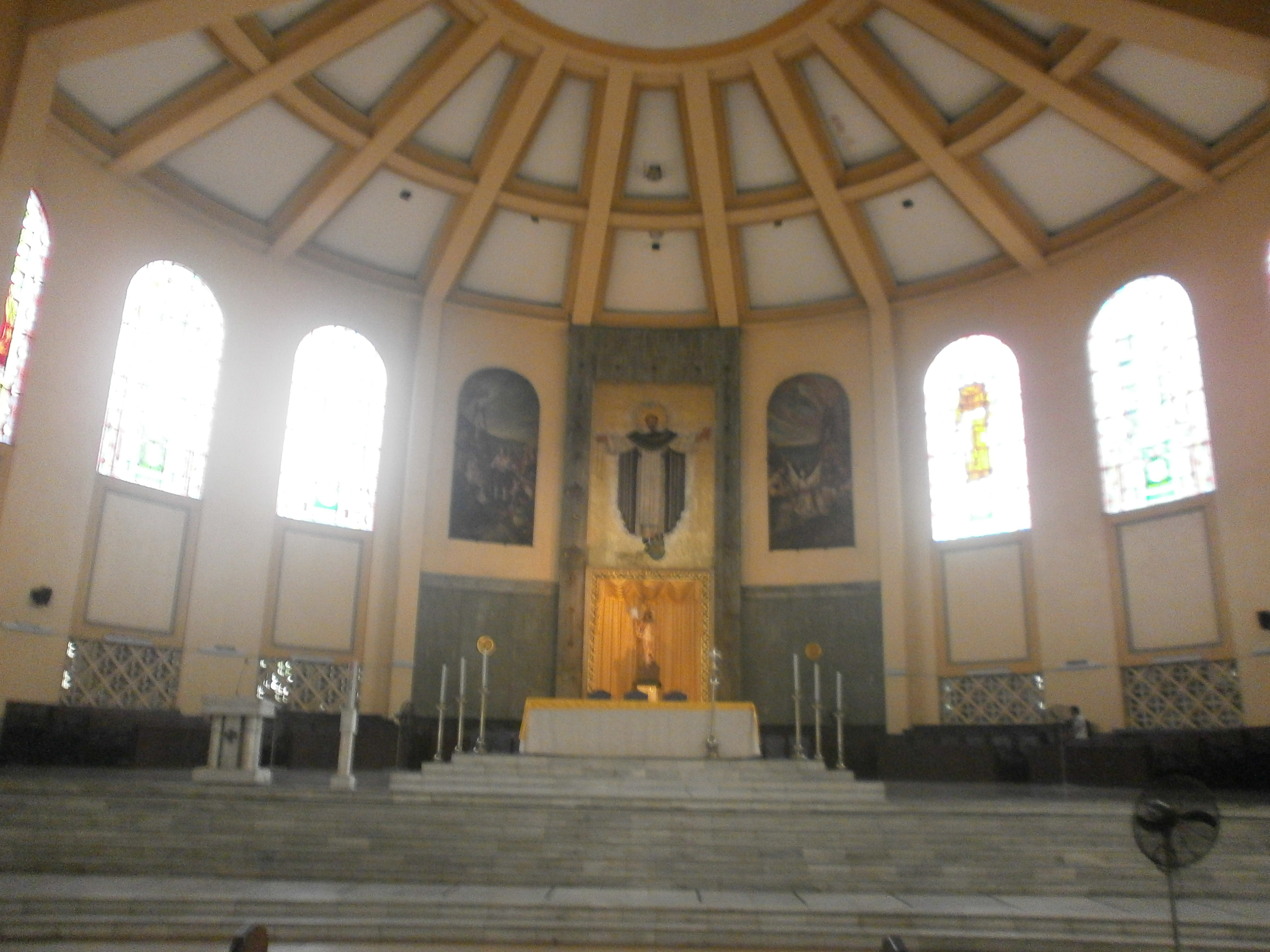
Main altar, with a mosaic of Saint Dominic

One of the shrine's stained glass windows

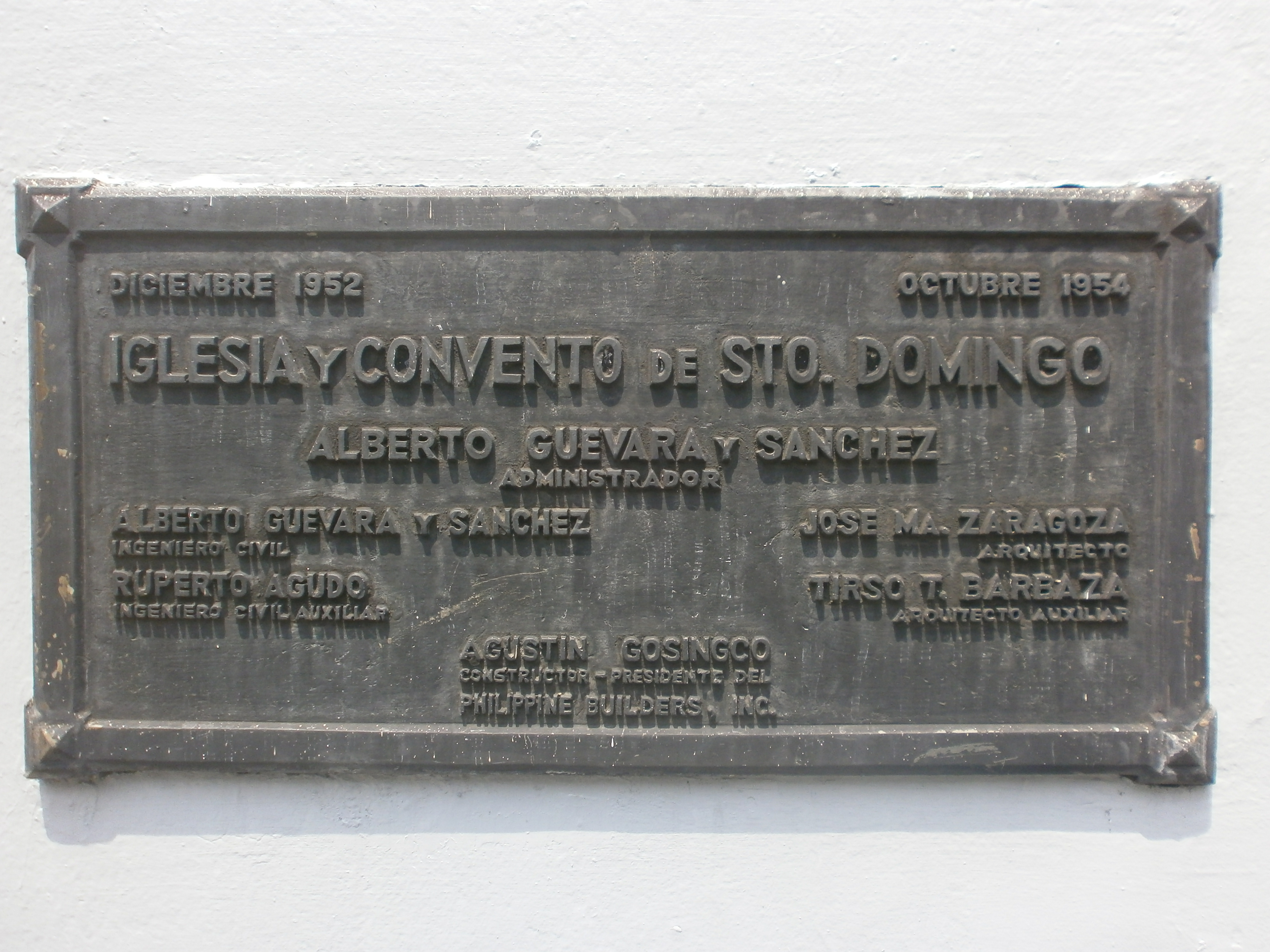
Commemorative marker, naming the principal builders of the shrine

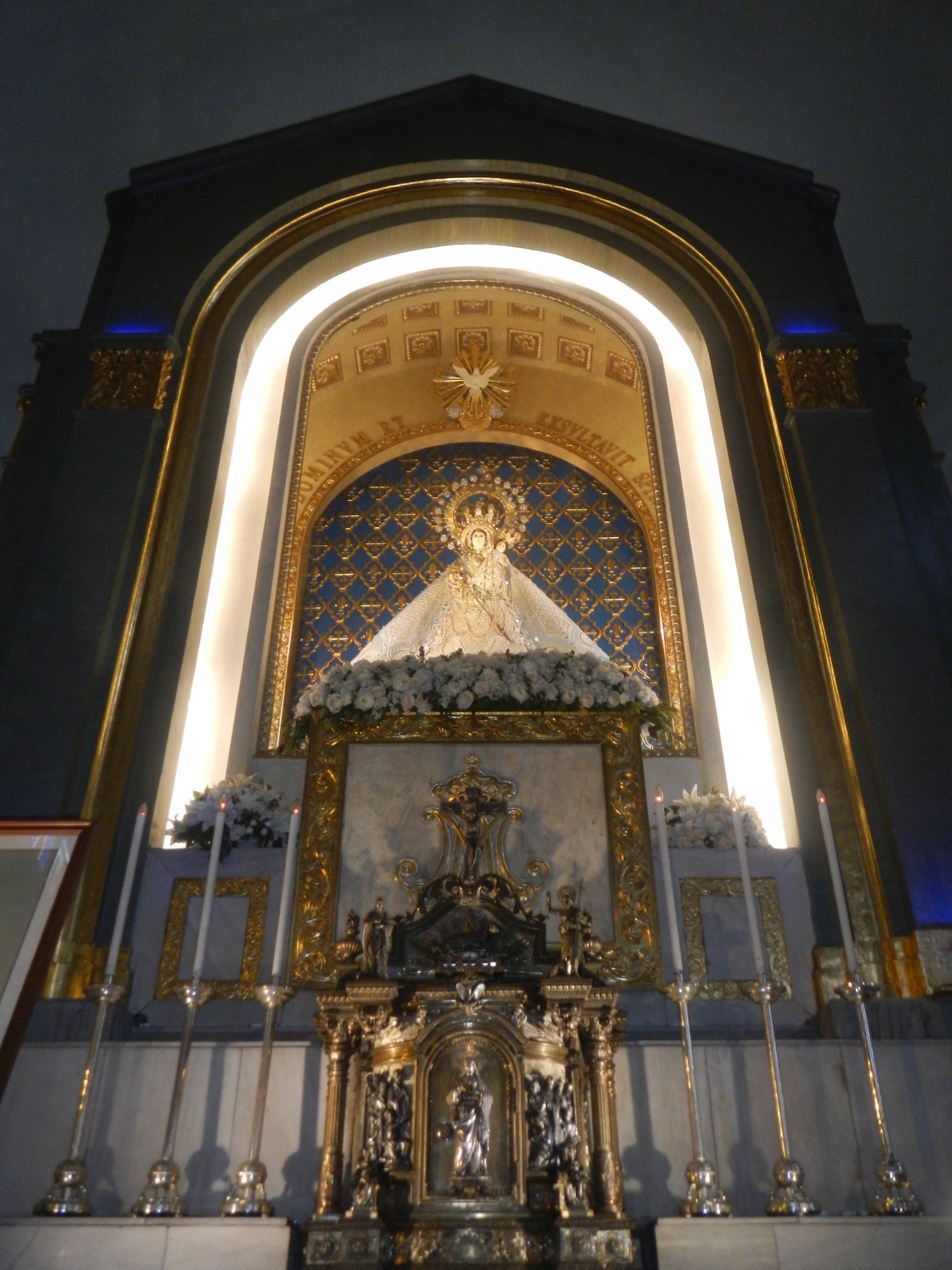
Left side altar, dedicated to Our Lady of La Naval de Manila

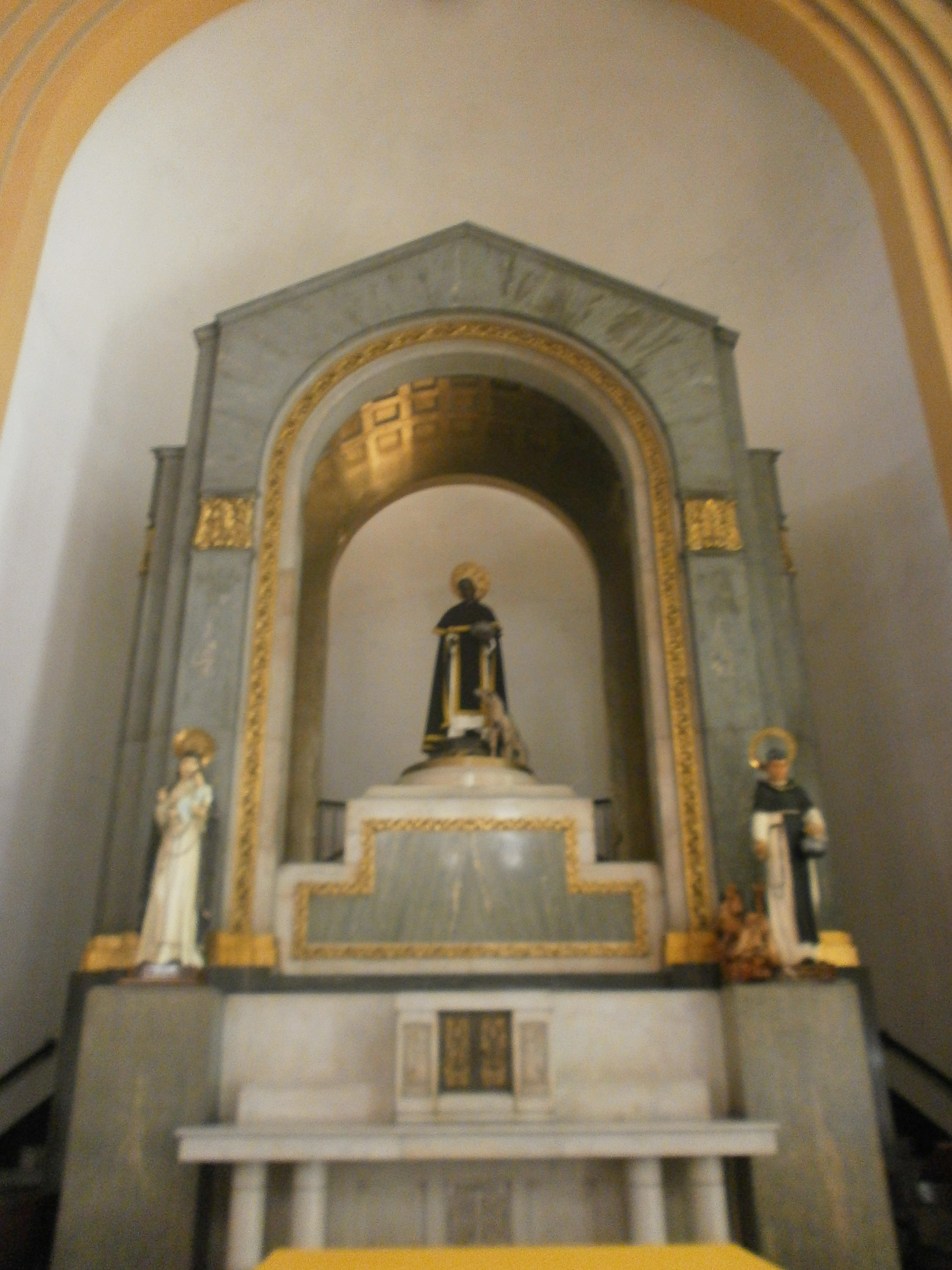
Right side altar, dedicated to Saint Martín de Porres

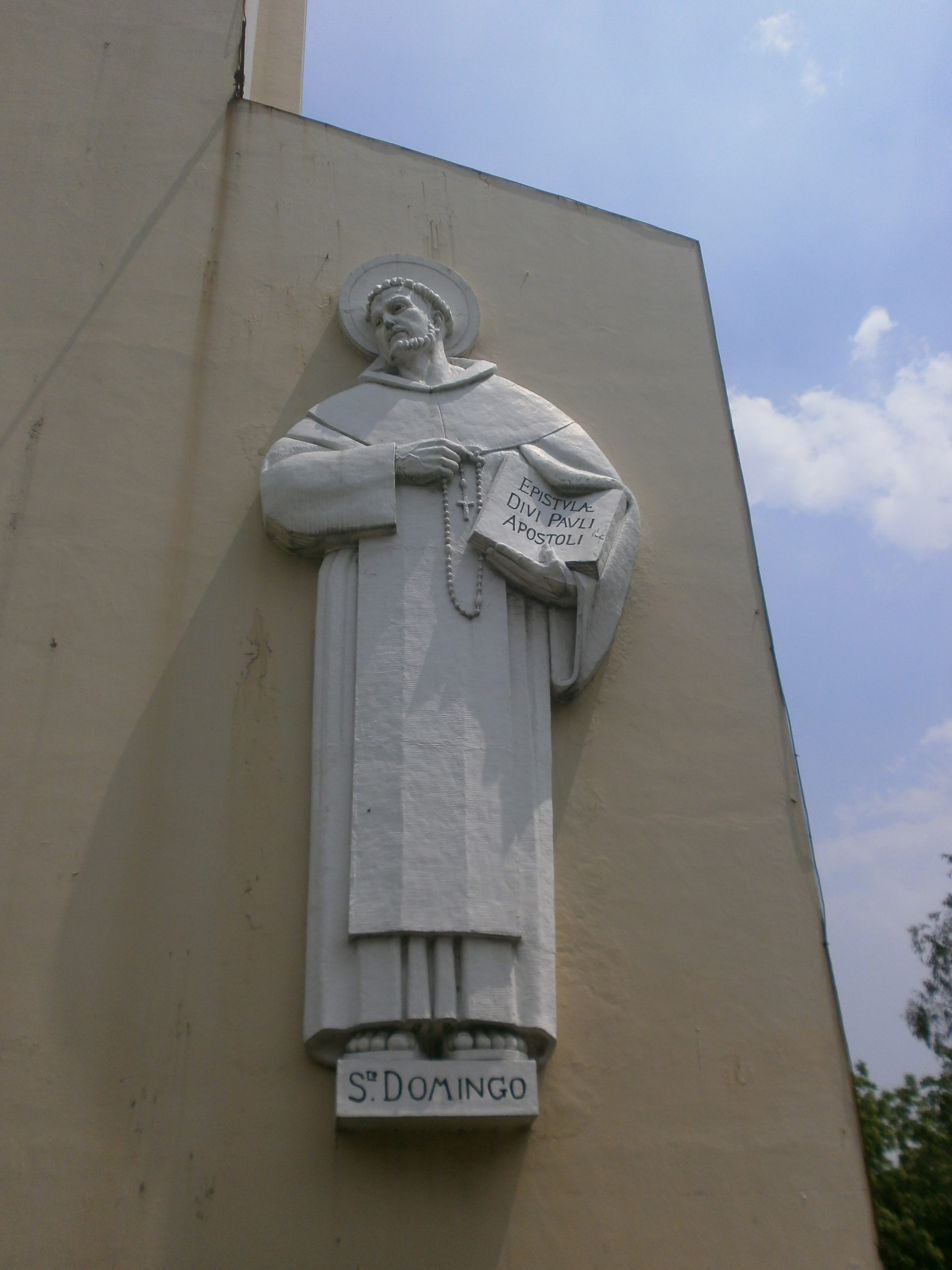
Bas-relief of Saint Dominic on the base of the belfry, sculpted by Francesco Riccardo Monti

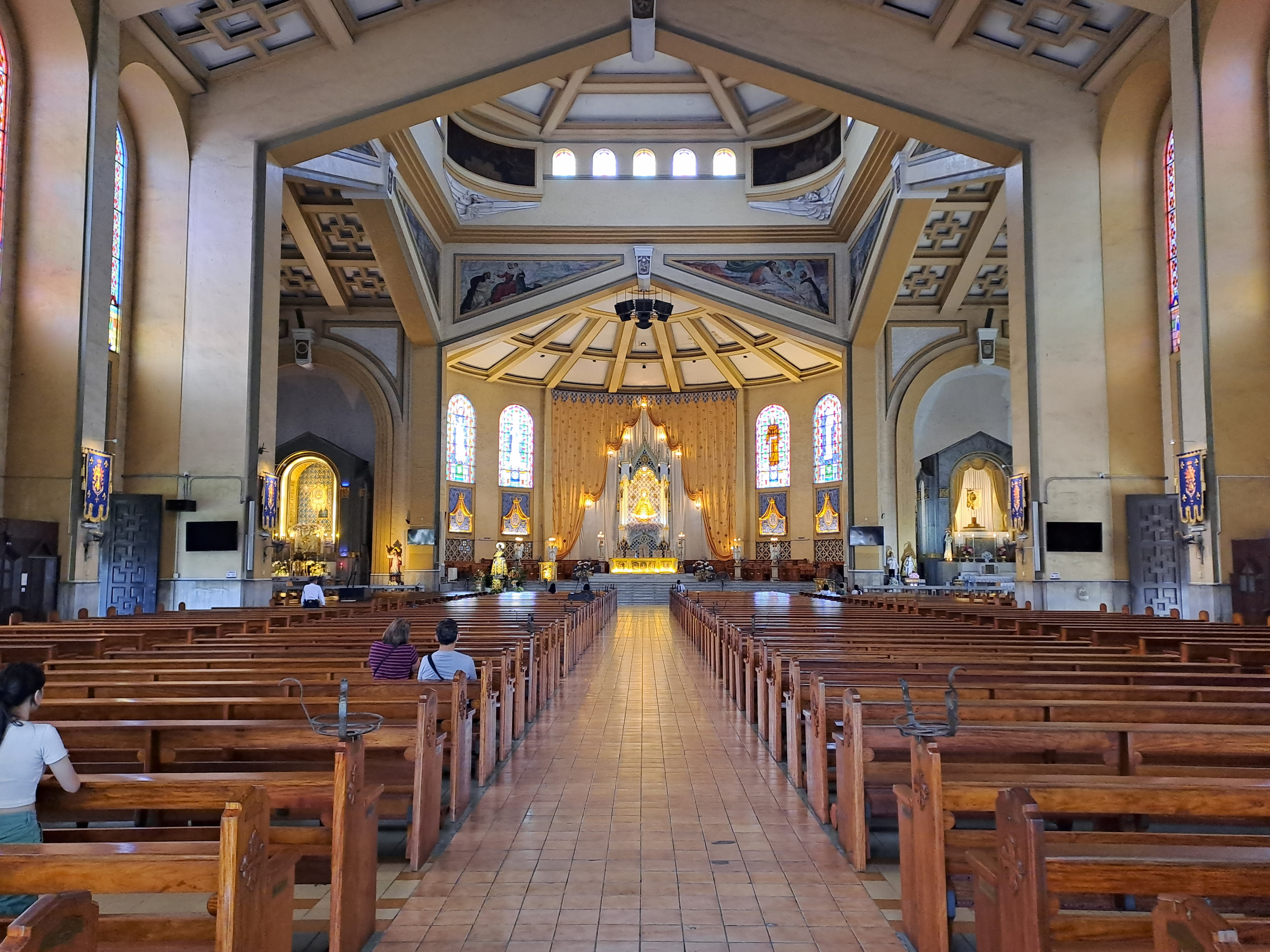
The nave and sanctuary with the La Naval de Manila image enshrined at the main altar

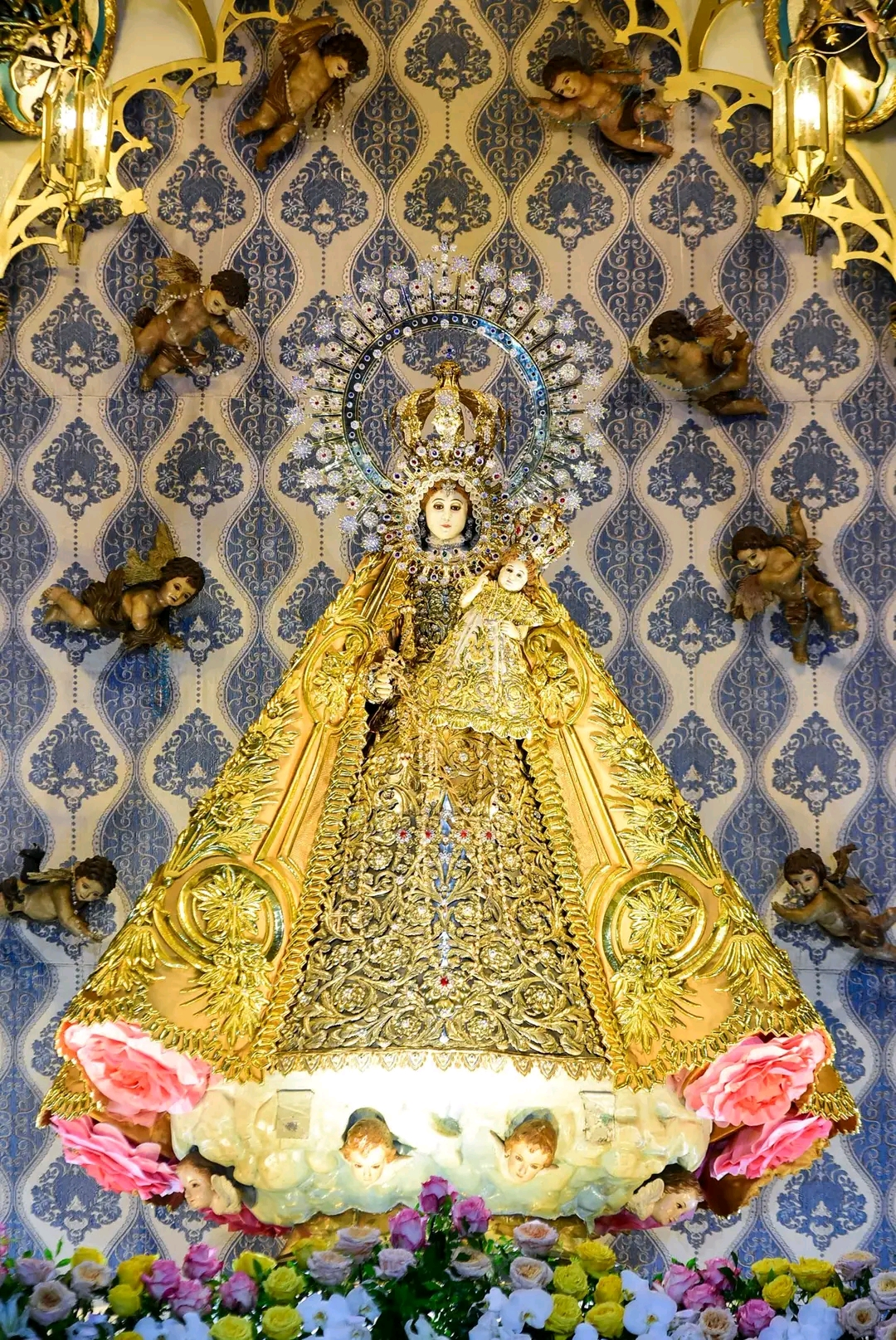
A close view of the baldacchino of the La Naval image enshrined in the main altar

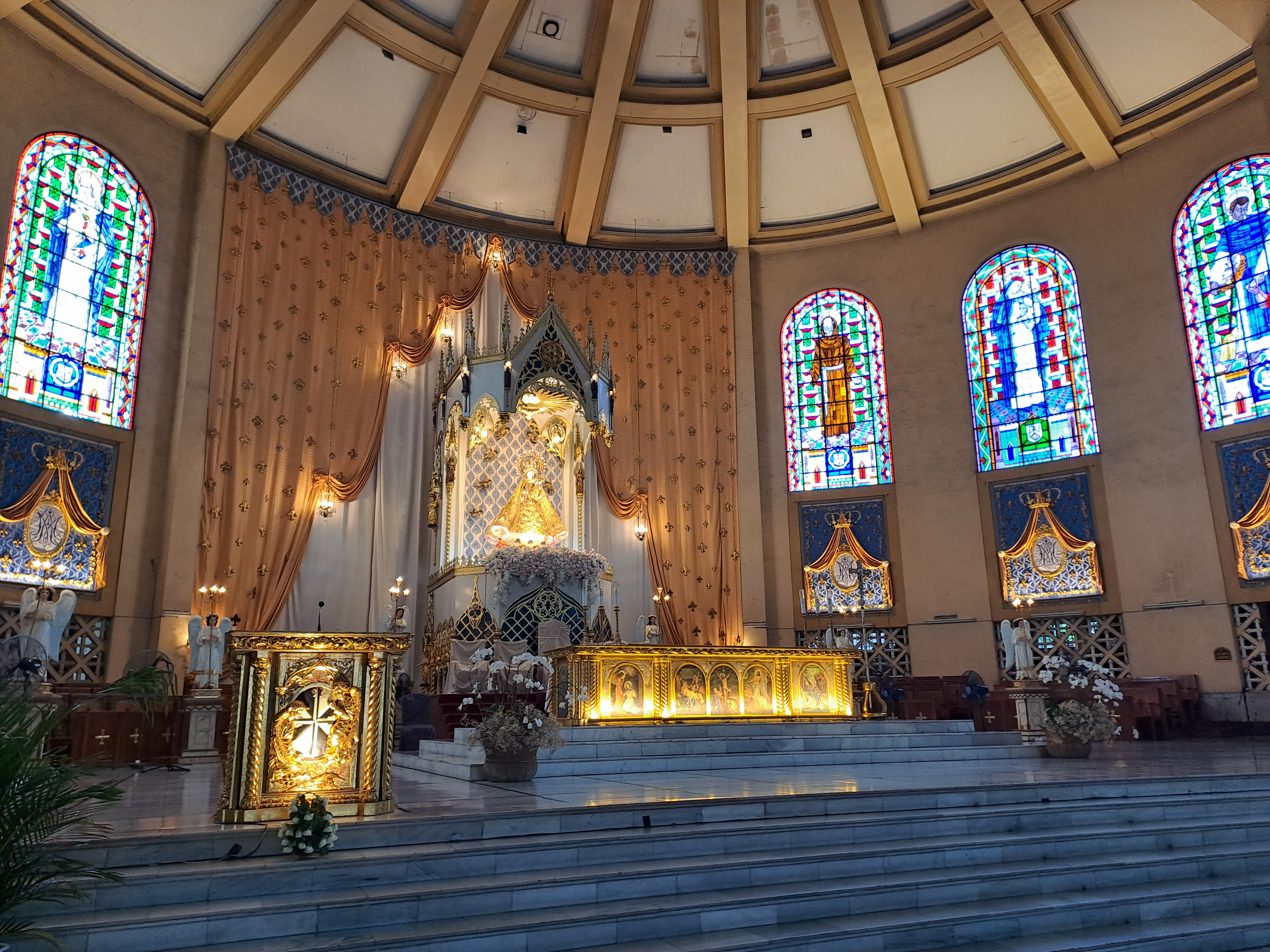
The main altar where the baldacchino with the enthroned La Naval image
