= Constance Chan Hon-yee =

Hong Kong medicine specialist and civil servant

- 陳漢儀
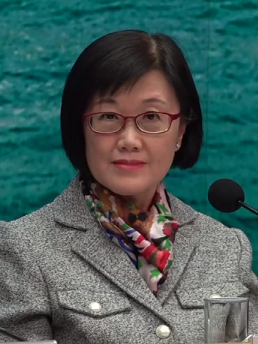
- Citizenship: Hong Kong
- Education: Rosaryhill School; University of Hong Kong; National University of Singapore
- Occupations: Doctor, Civil servant
- Children: 2

Chan Hon-yee, JP (Chinese: 陳漢儀; born October 20, 1961) is a Hong Kong medical specialist and civil servant who served as Director of Health and Director of the Auxiliary Medical Service.

== Early life ==
Chan Hon-yee was born on October 20, 1961. From kindergarten to preparatory school she completed her studies at Rosaryhill School. She was accepted to the Department of Medicine at the University of Hong Kong where she obtained a Bachelor of Medicine in 1985.

== Career ==
After graduating from university and practicing for more than two years, Chan joined the Hong Kong government as a government doctor in February 1988. Afterwards, she studied for a Master of Medicine in Public health at the National University of Singapore from 1991 to 1992. After returning to Hong Kong, she was promoted to Senior Doctor in November 1993 and then to Chief Doctor in July 1996. In August 2000, Chan was promoted to assistant director of Health and was appointed as an Official Justice of the Peace on July 1, 2006. She was appointed as the Food Safety Officer of the Food and Environmental Hygiene Department in October 2007. As Food Safety Commissioner, Chan promoted a mandatory nutrition labeling scheme in response to incidents such as the 2008 Chinese dairy contamination incident, and introduced new food safety control measures to help trace product origins following the Fukushima Daiichi nuclear power plant accident. In 2012, Chan broke with custom and passed Tsang Ho Fai Director of the Centre for Health Protection and Tam Lifen Deputy Director of Health to be appointed as the Director of Health.

Chan retired on September 21, 2021.

== Personal life ==
Chan Hon-yee is married with two sons.

== Honors ==
- Fellow of the Hong Kong Academy of Medicine - for her academic and career contributions in social medicine.
- Official Justice of the Peace - Constance Chan Hon-yee, JP (July 1, 2006 - ).
