= Tiples de Santo Domingo =

Philippine all-boy vocal group

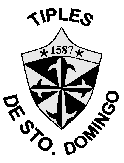

Background information
- Also known as: Tiples
- Origin: Manila, Philippines
- Genre: Choral music
- Years active: 1587–present
- Members: Prof. Eugene de los Santos, Ph.D. (Conductor)
- Website: Tiples de Santo Domingo Official Website

The Tiples de Manila is an all-boy vocal group established in 1587 by Rev. Fr. Pedro Bolaños, O.P., and is currently the oldest existing choral group in the Philippines. The word “tiple” in Spanish means the soprano voice of a boy. When members reach the age of puberty, their voices change either to a tenor or a bass. The boys range from 8 years old to 14 and sometimes a little bit older. The group was eventually maintained to sing for the annual celebration of the Feast of Our Lady of the Most Holy Rosary of La Naval de Manila held in October.

== History ==
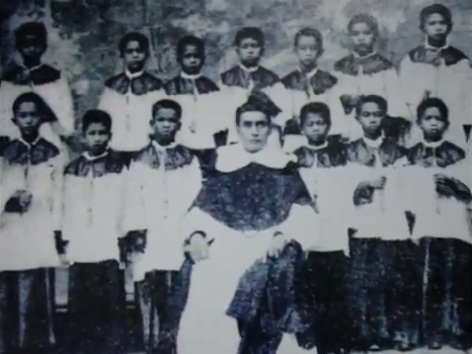
The Tiples de Santo Domingo, circa 19th Century

One of the first Dominican priests to arrive to the Philippines in 1587 was Rev. Fr. Pedro Bolaños, O.P. who had a knack for organizing and training boys to sing in the church. It is historically documented that he established such a choir in Bataan. The first Santo Domingo Church was built on January 1, 1588, inside Intramuros and tradition has it that a boys’ choir was also established to sing at the chapel of the Virgin of the Holy Rosary venerated in this church. It can, therefore, be said that the “tiples de Santo Domingo” has already been an integral part of Santo Domingo Church since the 16th century especially when the present image of the Virgin of the Holy Rosary was sculpted in 1593 and Santo Domingo Church became known as her shrine.

When the venerated image of Our Lady of the Most Holy Rosary of La Naval de Manila was brought to the Pontifical and Royal University of Santo Tomas during the Second World War, a boys choir was also formed and when the new church of Santo Domingo was built in Quezon City in 1954, the “Tiples de Santo Domingo” was revived with Rev. Fr. Marcelino Diaz, O.P. as choir director. The “Tiples” of the University of Santo Tomas continued for some time but later on gave way to the “Tiples” of Santo Domingo.

== Performances ==
The Tiples have sung not only inside the confines of Santo Domingo Church, but also in many varied locations. Many times they have been invited to the Malacañang Palace to entertain guests of Philippine Presidents, foreign dignitaries, and the likes. They also have had several concerts at the Cultural Center of the Philippines, at the former American Air Force base in Clark Field, and in other provinces and cities of the Philippines. In the 1970s, after two concerts called “Papuri I” and “Papuri II” they rendered a command performance at the same CCP venue during the General Chapter of the Dominican Order in 1977, held for the first time in the Philippines. The Tiples also performed in the last 39th Bamboo Organ Festival, held in Las Piñas together with the Las Piñas Boys Choir (LPBC). They sang "Jesu Joy of Man's Desiring"; by Johann Sebastian Bach, Eternal Life, Stabat Mater, Ynvocacion Ala Reina del Santísimo Rosario, Bendita Sea, and the very famous and renowned, Despedida Ala Virgen, and there duet with the LPBC; Duo Seraphim, by Mr. Joy T. Nilo, all conducted by Prof. Eugene Delos Santos. October 2014, the Tiples de Sto. Domingo together with the Hail Mary the Queen Children's Choir and several children's choir performed during the 6th Halina't Umawit; a children's Choir Festival held in the "Tanghalang Nicanor Abelarde" at the Cultural Center of the Philippines. The Tiples continues to sing for Our Lady of the Holy Rosary of La Naval, located in Santo Domingo Church in Quezon City, every Mondays, Wednesdays and Fridays during the Mass at 6 in the evening, and Sundays, 10 in the morning. The Chaplain of the Tiples de Sto. Domingo is the current Prior, Rev. Fr. Winston Ferdinand Roman F. Cabading, OP, assisted by Br. June Eduard Mercede, OP and Br. Jose Francisco Abella, OP.
