= Rosaryhill School =

- 玫瑰崗學校

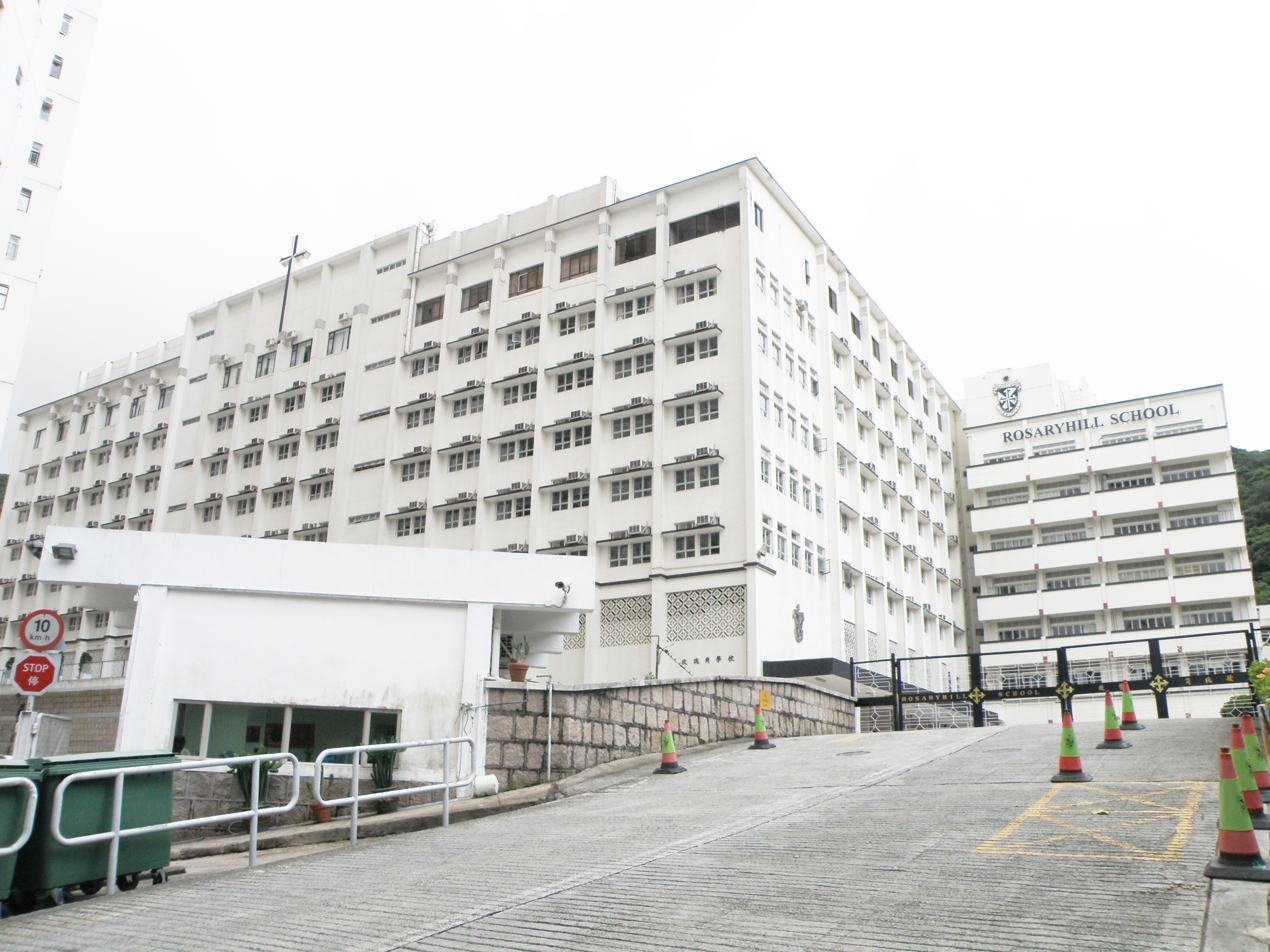
- Rosaryhill School

Location
- 41B Stubbs Road; Wan Chai, Hong Kong Island; Hong Kong; 22°15′49″N 114°10′57″E

Information
- Type: Private primary and secondary school
- Motto: Latin: Veritas (Truth)
- Religious affiliation: Catholicism
- Denomination: Dominican Order
- Established: 1959; 67 years ago
- Closed: 2024; 2 years ago
- Colours: Black and white
- Affiliation: Dominican Fathers of Holy Rosary Province
- Website: www.rhs.edu.hk
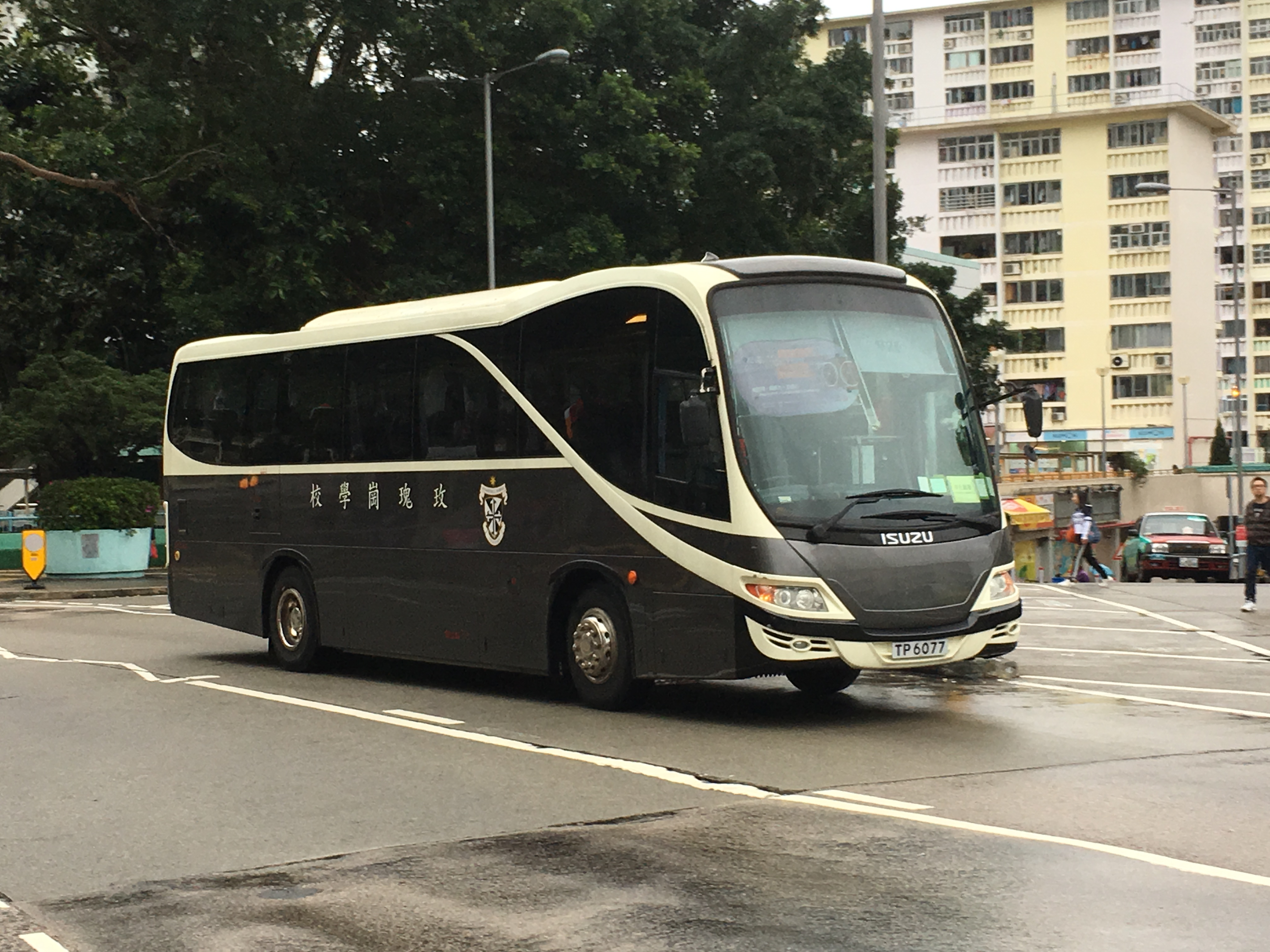
- Rosaryhill School Bus, in 2019

Rosaryhill School (Chinese: 玫瑰崗學校) was a co-educational school in Hong Kong, offering kindergarten, primary and secondary education. The school was founded in 1959, and was closed in 2024.

== History ==
The school was founded by the Dominican Order in 1959 as the Dominican Primary School, at the site of the St. Albert the Great Priory. Since the establishment of Rosaryhill School, the position of Supervisor has always been filled by Dominican priests.

In 2007 the Kindergarten Section of the school was separated to become the Rosaryhill Kindergarten. The Business Studies Section was discontinued in 2012; in 2017 the Secondary Section was separated as the Rosaryhill Secondary School.

In September 2023, Rosaryhill announced that it would cease operations at the end of the 2025-26 school year; the secondary section would be transferred to Yu Chun Keung Memorial College No 2 in Pok Fu Lam, while the primary and kindergarten sections would be given over to Dalton School Hong Kong. Later the closure date was moved to the end of the 2023-24 school year, two years earlier than originally announced; the school officially closed on 13 July 2024.

== Sections ==
At the time of its closure, the school had three sections: kindergarten, primary, and secondary. In the past, it offered business studies.

== Notable alumni ==
- Hon. Bernard Charnwut Chan – member of the Executive Council of Hong Kong
- Bobo Chan – former Hong Kong singer and model
- Constance Chan Hon-yee – medicine specialist and civil servant
- Leslie Cheung – Cantopop singer and actor, considered as one of the founding fathers of Cantopop
- Kelly Chen – Cantopop singer and actress
- Charlene Choi – actress and singer, best known as a member of the Cantopop girl group Twins, alongside Gillian Chung
- Queenie Chu – 1st Runner Up of Miss Hong Kong 2004; actress of TVB
- Tony Leung Ka Fai – actor, known for his starring in the horror feature Double Vision; won three times Best Actor Award in Hong Kong Film Awards
- Kenix Kwok – actress
- Barbara Yung – actress, popular during the early 1980s
