= St. Albert the Great Priory =

Catholic house of studies in Victoria City, Hong Kong

St. Albert the Great Priory was a Roman Catholic monastery at 41A and 41B Stubbs Road (I.L. no. 3550) in Victoria City, on the mid-levels of Mount Nicholson near Wong Nai Chung Gap on Hong Kong Island, Hong Kong, inaugurated on 24 November 1935, which came to be known as Rosaryhill or Rosary Hill. It was a house of studies of the Dominican Order's Province of Our Lady of the Rosary in the Far East.

During the 24 years of existence, the house of studies was the breeding ground for four bishops. A convent in the name of St. Albert the Great Priory has remained to this day following the monastery's conversion into the campus of a school.

The old monastery was used as a civilian internment camp during the Japanese occupation of the territory (1941–1945) in the Pacific Theatre of the Second World War. It remained a rehabilitation centre until 1947. From 1949 onwards, bishops, priests and seminarians from across the border sought refuge in the monastery.

A Shrine of Our Lady of Fatima was dedicated on the southeastern side of the site.

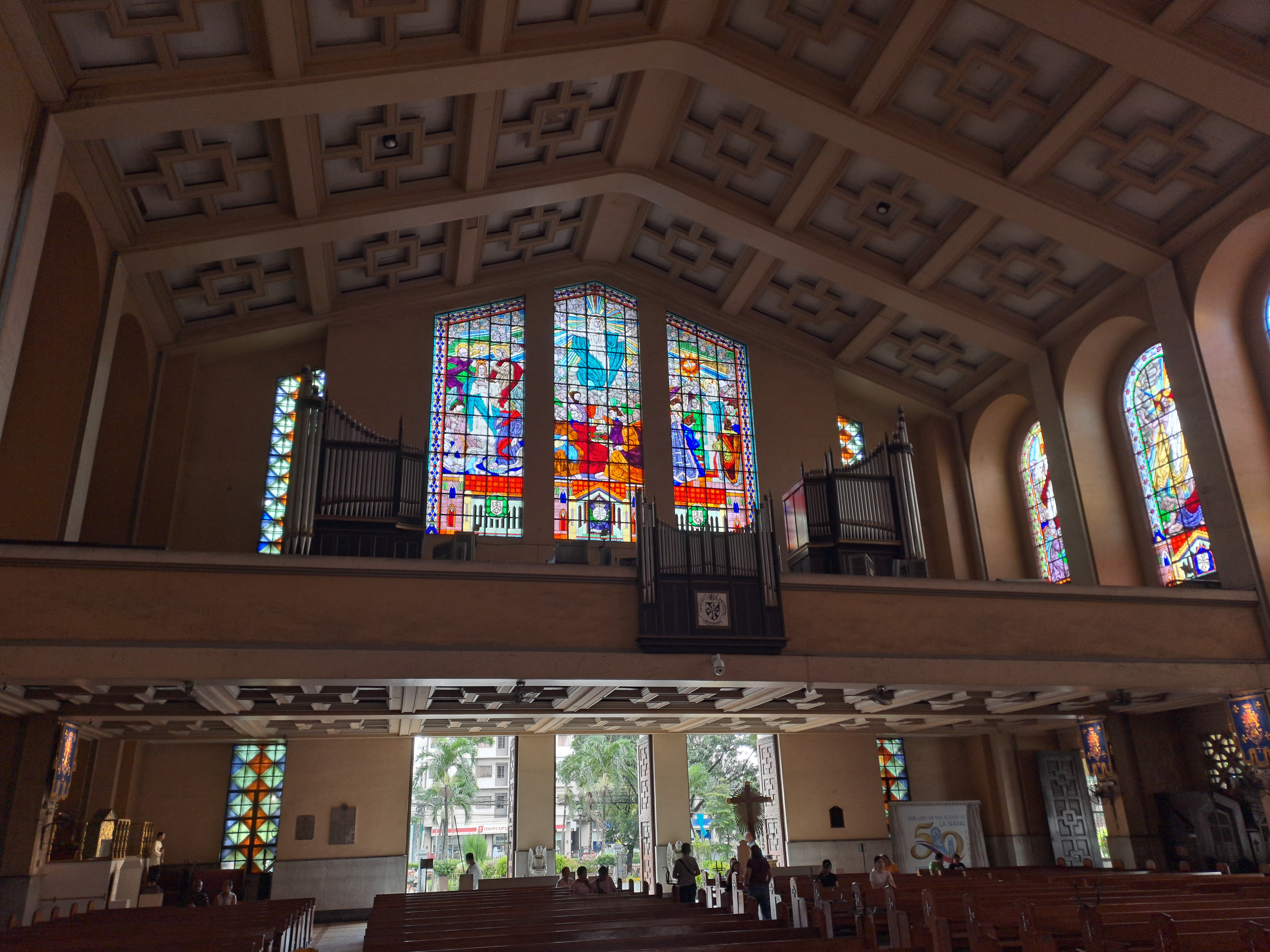
The choir loft of Santo Domingo Church, Quezon, the Philippines, where the pipe organ was rebuilt.

A pipe organ was built by William Charlton Blackett for the priory. It was moved in the 1950s to the Church of Santo Domingo in Quezon City in the Philippines.

New centres of studies became available in Saigon, South Vietnam and Manila, the Philippines and along with the fall of the régime across the border the monastery was closed in the 1950s. In its place are the campus of Rosaryhill School (41B Stubbs Road) and Villa Monte Rosa (41A). The Fatima Shrine remains part of the campus' territory; and the St. Albert the Great Chapel forms part of the school's campus building constructed in the 1960s.

The house of St. Albert, from which time became a convent, moved to the west side of the sixth floor of the new campus building. The expanded convent started to be used as novitiate again on 10 January 2010. The east side of the sixth floor had become available with the closure of the Business Section of the school in 2012. Since 2014, St. Albert convent has also been estudiantate for Chinese brothers.

One of the stone markers of the boundaries of the City of Victoria, erected in 1903, is located near the Fatima Shrine.
