= Our Lady of La Naval de Manila =

Venerated image of the Blessed Virgin Mary

Our Lady of the Most Holy Rosary La Naval de Manila
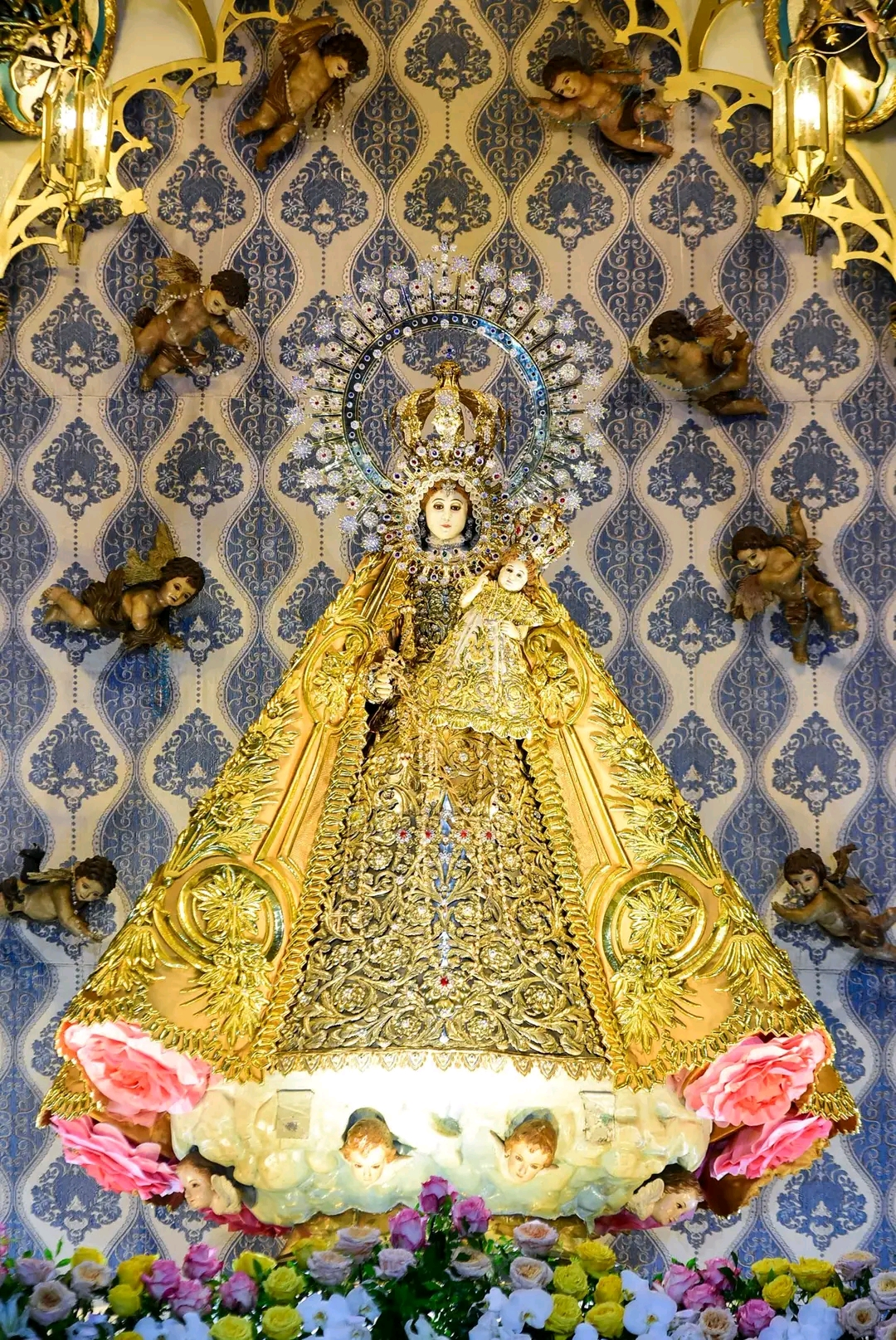
- The image enthroned for its annual festivities
- Location: Quezon City, Philippines
- Date: 1593
- Type: Ivory, wood statue
- Approval: Pope Pius X Pope Paul VI
- Venerated in: Catholic Church
- Shrine: National Shrine of Our Lady of the Most Holy Rosary, Quezon City, Philippines
- Patronage: Philippine Navy; Quezon City
- Feast day: Second Sunday of October

Our Lady of La Naval de Manila is a title of the Blessed Virgin Mary associated with an ivory image in Quezon City, Philippines. Pious believers claim that the Virgin's intercession helped defeat the invading forces of the Protestant Dutch Republic during the Battles of La Naval de Manila in 1646.

Pope Pius X granted the image a decree of Pontifical coronation on 4 April 1906. The rite of coronation was executed by Archbishop Ambrose Agius on 5 October 1907. The Government of the Philippines designated the icon and its shrine as a National Cultural Treasure in 2012, making it one of the country's Cultural Properties.

== Description ==
Measuring approximately four feet and eight inches high, the body is made of hardwood in the cage or Bastidor style. The face and hands, as well as the entire Child Jesus, are made of solid ivory of pristine quality standard as compared to other ivory images preserved in the country. Since its creation, the statue – considered the oldest dated ivory carving in the Philippines – has always been decorated with ornate garments and imperial regalia.

Some 310,000 individuals led by professors of the University of Santo Tomas, donated their heirloom jewels, gemstones, gold and silver to the image for its canonical coronation in October 1907. These now form part of the icon's vast collection of elaborate regalia, with some pieces dating to the 18th century.

== History ==
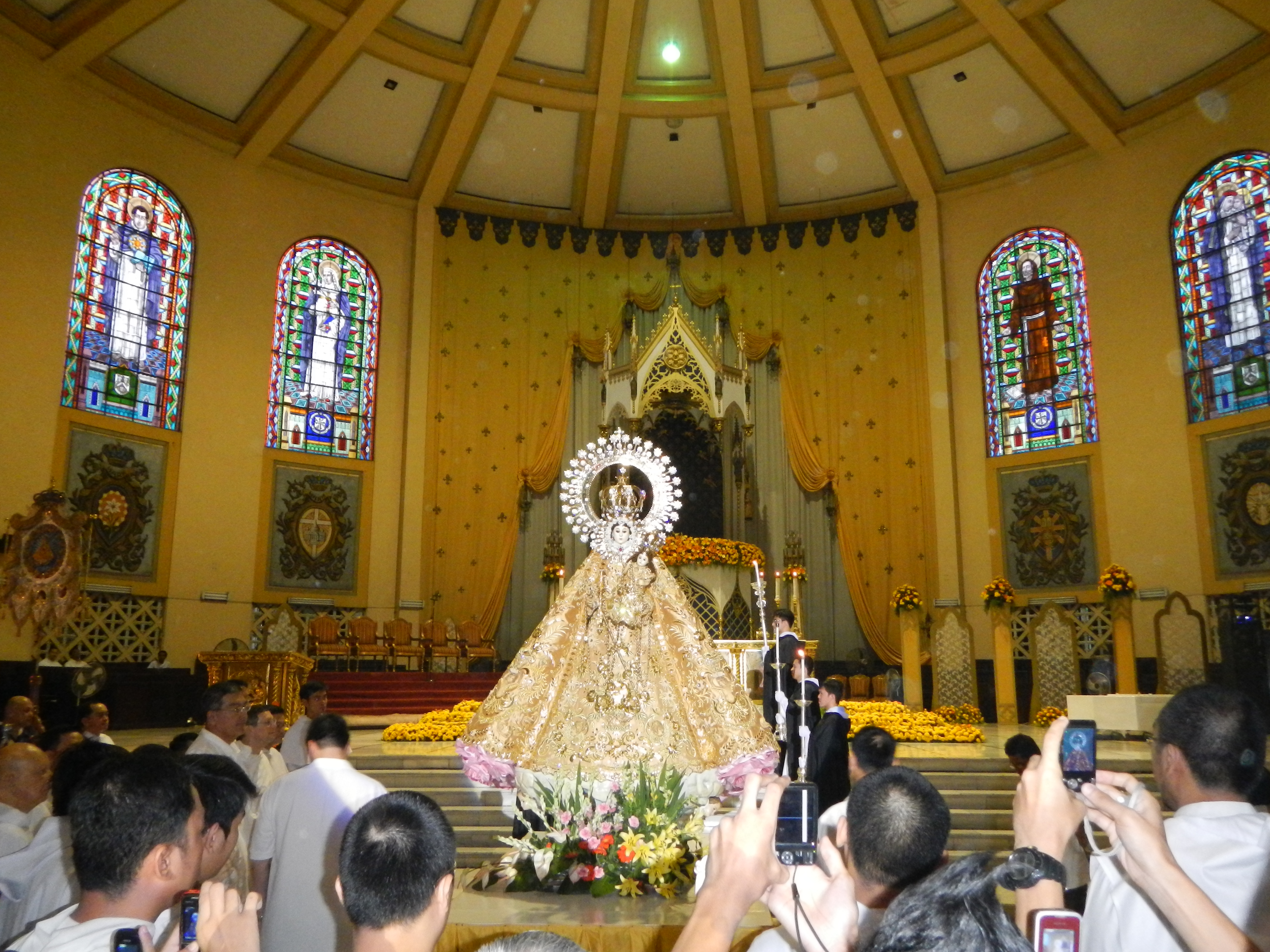
Procession before the enthronement of Our Lady of the Most Holy Rosary of La Naval

In 1593, the new Governor-General, Don Luis Pérez Dasmariñas, commissioned a statue of Our Lady of the Rosary for public veneration in memory of his recently deceased father. Under the direction of Captain Hernándo de los Ríos Coronel, the sculpture was made by an anonymous Chinese immigrant who later converted to Christianity; this is the commonly cited reason for the statue's East Asian facial features. The statue was later given to the Dominican friars, who enshrined inside Santo Domingo Church.

In 1646, naval forces of the Dutch Republic made several repeated attempts to conquer the Philippines in a bid to control trade in Asia. The combined Spanish and Filipino forces who fought were said to have requested the intercession of the Virgin through the statue prior to battle. They were urged to place themselves under the protection of Our Lady of the Rosary and to pray the rosary repeatedly. They went on to rebuff the continued attacks by the superior Dutch fleet, engaging in five major battles at sea and losing only fifteen members of the Spanish Navy. After the Dutch retreat, in fulfillment of their vow, the survivors walked barefoot to the shrine in gratitude to the Virgin.

Later, on 9 April 1662, the cathedral chapter of the Archdiocese of Manila declared the naval victory a miraculous event owed to the intercession of the Virgin Mary, declaring:

Granted by the Sovereign Lord through the intercession of the Most Holy Virgin and devotion to her Rosary, that the miracles be celebrated, preached and held in festivities and to be recounted amongst the miracles wrought by the Lady of the Rosary for the greater devotion of the faithful to Our Most Blessed Virgin Mary and Her Holy Rosary.

Pope Pius X authorized granting the statue a canonical crown in 1906, which was bestowed by the apostolic delegate to the Philippines, Ambrose Agius, OSB During the Japanese bombardment in 1942, fearing that the statue would be destroyed, church authorities hid the statue at the University of Santo Tomas until 1946, the 300th anniversary of the battles.

The image was translated in October 1954 to a new shrine built to house it inside the new Santo Domingo Church in Quezon City–the sixth such building since it was first erected in the late sixteenth century in Intramuros. For the 8.6 km-procession, devotees constructed a boat-shaped carriage with angels (Spanish: Carroza Triunfal) to bring the image to its new home, which was declared her National Shrine by the Catholic Bishops Conference of the Philippines. In October 1973, the Virgin of La Naval was formally declared the patroness of Quezon City, at that time the national capital. Filipino Archbishop Mariano Gaviola declared her patroness of the Philippine Navy in 1975, a patronage invoked until this day.

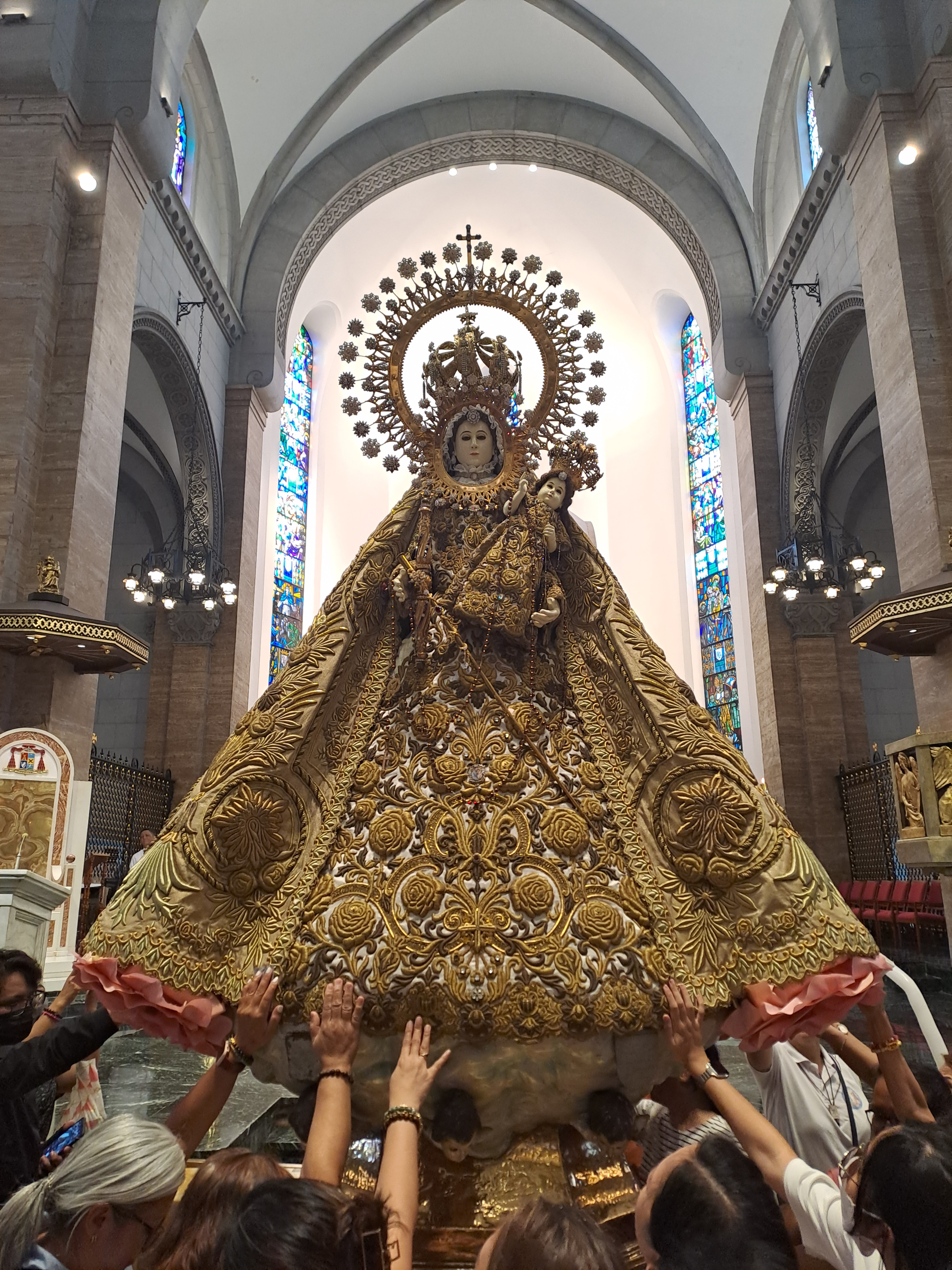
A replica of the image at the Manila Cathedral in Intramuros

During the People Power Revolution of February 1986, a replica of the statue was brought in procession to the Malacañan Palace by the Dominican friars, in a peaceful protest of the state of martial law instituted by President Ferdinand Marcos. The replica was also brought to the eastern gate of Camp Crame, the police headquarters holding the rebel forces headed by Defense Minister Juan Ponce Enrile with Armed Forces Vice Chief of Staff and Philippine Constabulary Chief Lt. Gen. Fidel V. Ramos. Many Filipino Catholics attribute the revolution's peaceful victory to the miraculous intervention of the Blessed Virgin Mary and the rosary.

Filipino historian Nick Joaquín attributed one of the red jewels in one of the statue's crowns to an old legend of a giant serpent in the Pasig River; the folktale is more likely an allegory of the triumph of Christianity over paganism. Another crown was supposedly inscribed and donated by King Norodom of Cambodia in 187; one had disappeared in a 1930 burglary; another one was simply two pearls adorning the orbs of the statue.

In December 2011, the Eternal Word Television Network featured the image as the "Grandest Marian Icon in the Philippines" on an episode of the programme Mary: Mother of the Philippines.

The image, the shrine complex, along with objects stored within, were declared a National Cultural Treasure by the National Museum of the Philippines on 4 October 2012. This declaration is in accordance with Republic Act 10066 (National Cultural Heritage Act of 2009) announced by the Catholic Bishops' Conference of the Philippines and by the National Museum.

== Pontifical approbations ==
The statue has merited several papal honours, namely the following:

- Pope Leo XIII sent a letter in 1903 to the former Archbishop of Manila, Jeremiah James Harty, exhorting the people to come in pilgrimage to the Virgin's shrine in the Santo Domingo Church (then in Intramuros).

"...Go to the temple of Santo Domingo, to the sanctuary of the excellence of the Most Holy Virgin of the Rosary in the Philippines, to the place where your elders bent their knees to give thanks to her who liberated these Islands from Protestant heresy, to the spot consecrated by the piety of one hundred generations who had gone there to deposit their piety and confidence in Mary most holy... — Leone XIII, P.P. "

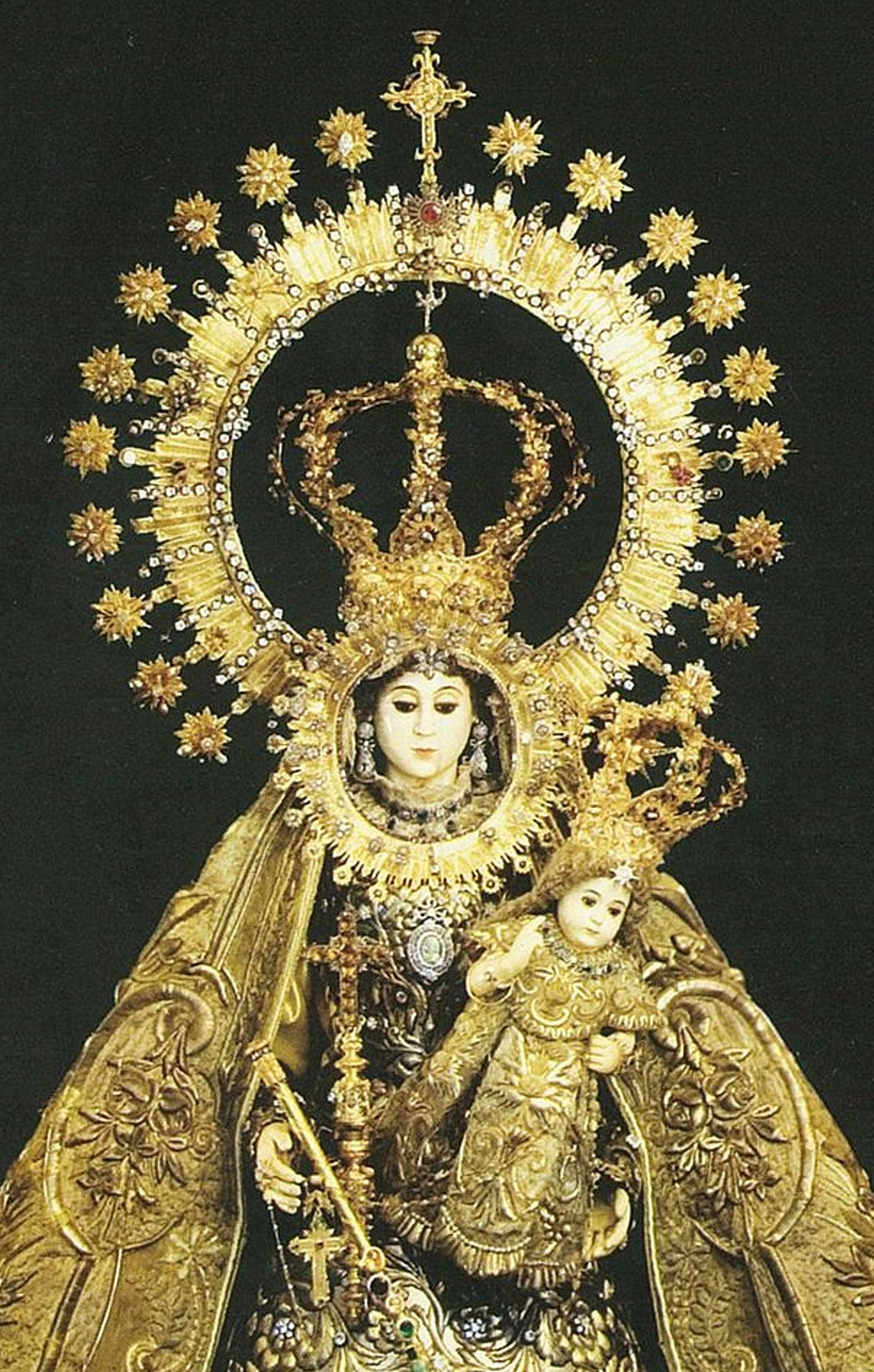
Our Lady of La Naval wearing the Pontifical crown which was placed in 1907

- Pope Pius X granted the image a canonical coronation through Archbishop Dom Ambrose Agius of Malta on 4 April 1906 from the letter of Papal Audience granted to the chaplain of Santa Catalina Normal School, Dominican priest Santiago Paya. The rite of coronation was executed on 5 October 1907.
- Pope Pius XII sent an Apostolic Letter to former Archbishop of Manila, Michael James O’Doherty titled Philippinas Insulas Deo on the occasion of the tricentennial anniversary of the Battle of La Naval de Manila on 31 July 1946.
- Pope Paul VI proclaimed this Marian title as the patroness of Quezon City via Pontifical decree on 26 August 1974, notarized by the Congregation for Divine Worship and the Discipline of the Sacraments.
- Pope John Paul II dedicated the Asian continent to the same title, using a replica of the icon on 18 February 1981. The Pontiff blessed the original image the next day in another public Catholic Mass during his Apostolic Visit in Manila.

== Feast ==
Feast of Our Lady of La Naval de Manila
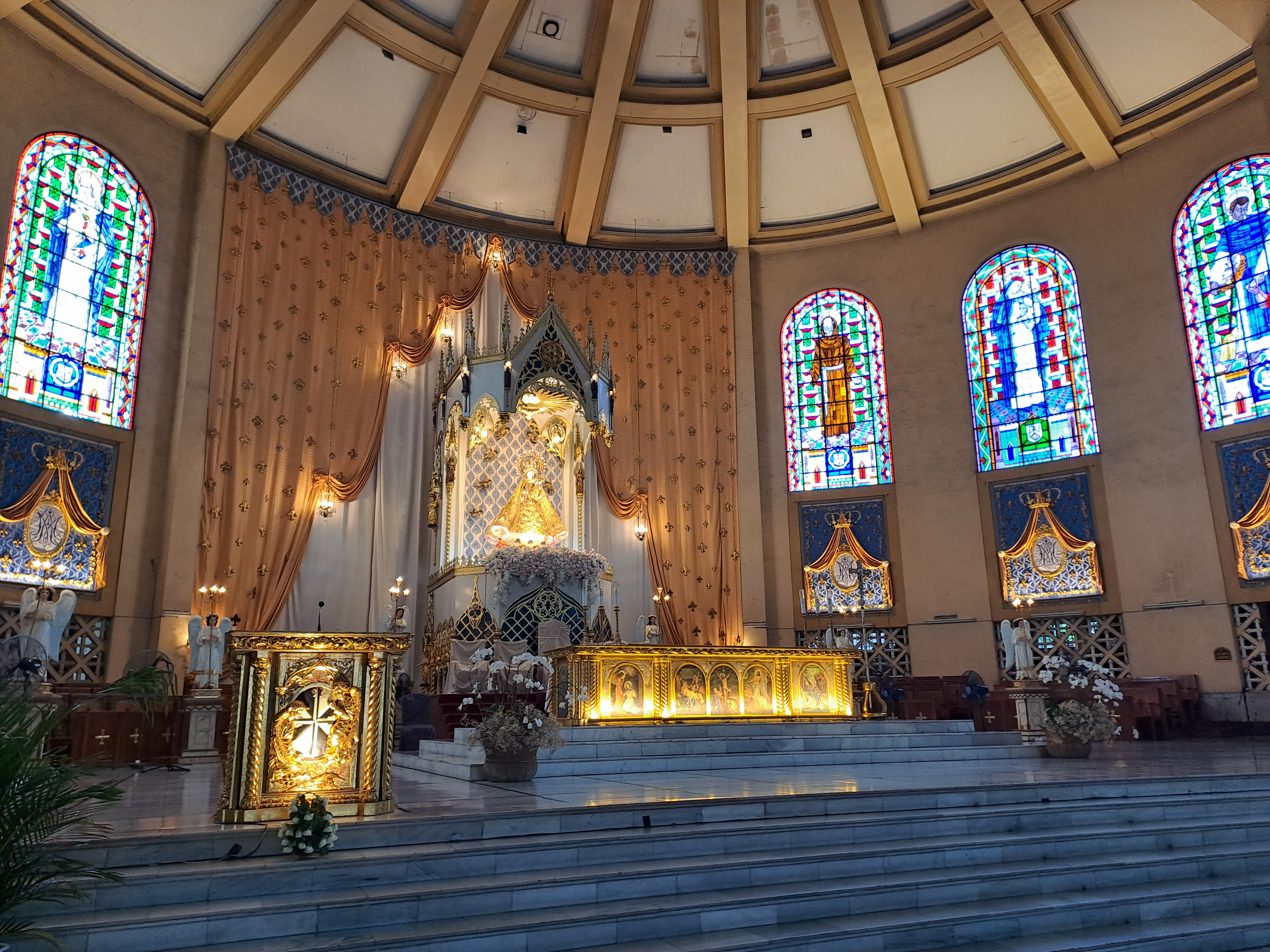
- La Naval de Manila at the baldachin after the enthronement rites
- Also called: Procesion de las Procesiones
- Observed by: Quezon City
- Type: Religious / Cultural
- Date: Second Sunday in October
- 2025 date: October 12
- 2026 date: October 11
- 2027 date: October 10
- 2028 date: October 8
- Frequency: Annual

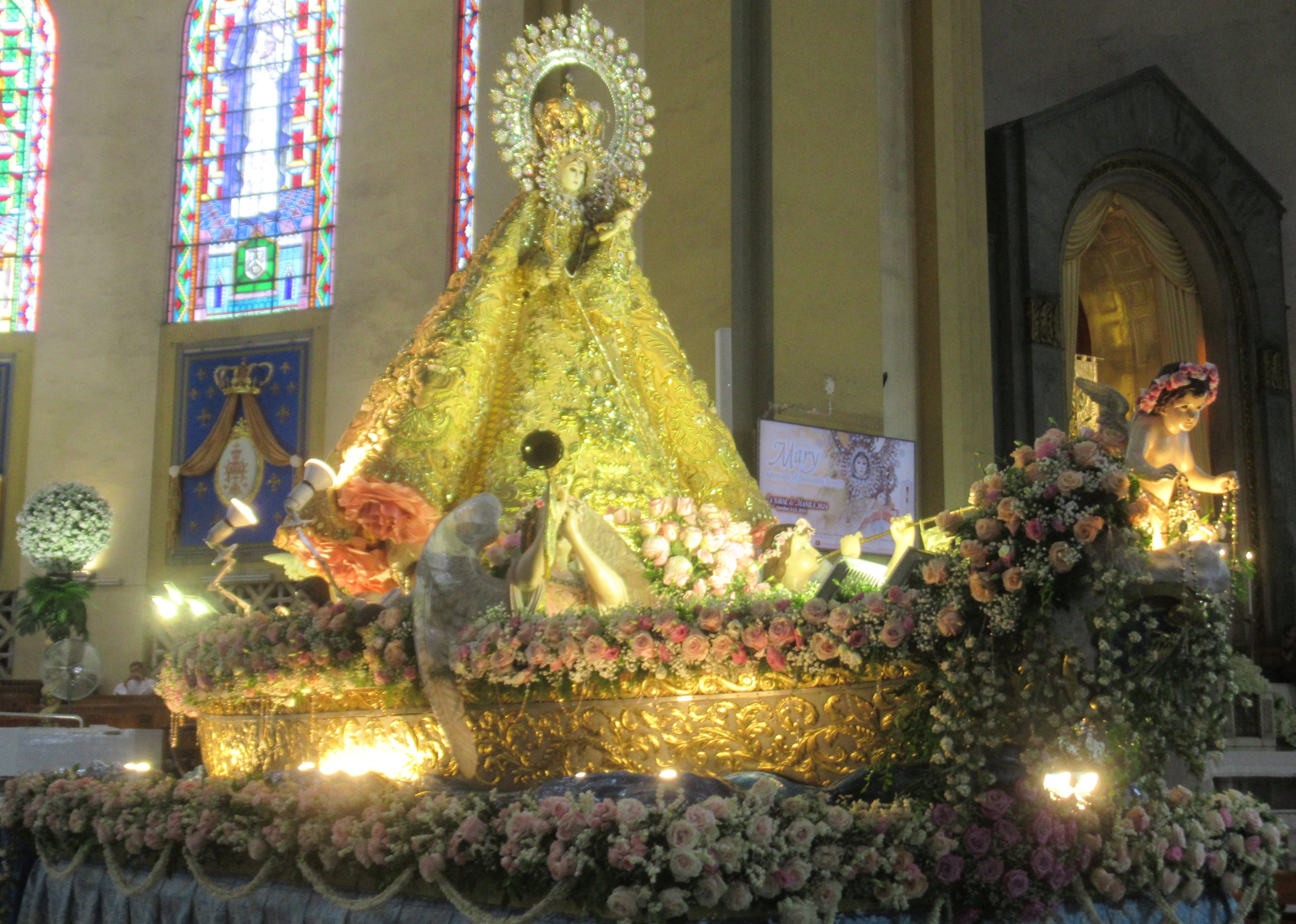
La Naval de Manila

The feast of Our Lady of La Naval de Manila is on the second Sunday of October, having been celebrated on that date since 1646. Since 2023, the feast day of the image has been observed as a proper solemnity in Quezon City.

The first procession was held in October 1646 in Intramuros to commemorate the Spanish victory in the Battles of La Naval de Manila. The procession in Old Intramuros is once known as the "Procession of All Processions", and is known to be the grandest feast of Old Manila.

In 2020 and 2021, the image's procession was cancelled due to the COVID-19 pandemic in the Philippines. Instead, the image was enshrined outside the shrine for devotees to venerate.

In 2023, city-wide celebrations were held in Quezon City to commemorate the fiftieth anniversary of the declaration of the Marian title as patroness of the city.

== See also ==
- Catholic Church in the Philippines
- Roman Catholic Diocese of Cubao
