= Seeds of Peace: The Life of Fr. Rhoel D. Gallardo, CMF =

- Directed by: Rommel Galapia Ruiz
- Starring: Zaijian Jaranilla
- Release date: March 20, 2026
- Country: Philippines
- Language: Filipino

The Seeds of Peace: The Life of Fr. Rhoel D. Gallardo, CMF is a 2026 Philippine biographical documentary film covering the life of Roman Catholic priest Rhoel Gallardo. The film is directed by Rommel Galapia Ruiz, with Zaijian Jaranilla playing the role of Gallardo.

== Cast ==
- Zaijian Jaranilla as Fr. Rhoel Gallardo, a Roman Catholic priest who is part of the Claretian Missionaries.

== Production ==
Seeds of Peace was directed by Rommel Galapia Ruiz. It is a biographical documentary film covering Claretian priest Rhoel Gallardo who was killed by Abu Sayyaf militants in May 2000 after he and other members of the Christian community in Sumisip, Basilan were abducted

However, the coverage of the film goes beyond Gallardo's death. Ruiz intend to document the Roman Catholic priest's life from childhood until his death and his legacy. He devised interviews, archival footage, and personal testimonies to create the film. Some scenes were filmed in Basilan, with the film also tackling the changes in the province since Gallardo's death.

The film had the involvement with the Claretian Missionaries and the Gallardo family who were part of the production process including the casting.

== Release ==
Seeds of Peace premiered in March 20, 2026 marking the anniversary of Gallardo's abduction 26 years ago. The film was exhibited via private screenings across the Philippines. On May 2, 2026, the film had a special international screening at the Lumiere Romford cinema in London, United Kingdom.

Seeds of Peace, as one of the official entries of the 52nd Metro Manila Film Festival, is set to have a wider commercial release in the Philippines on December 25, 2026. However, its eligibility is being challenged due to its prior screenings.
