= U.S. Catholic =

U.S. Catholic may refer to:

- Catholic Church in the United States
- U.S. Catholic, a publication of the Claretians
