= McCoy de Leon =

Filipino actor and dancer (born 1995)

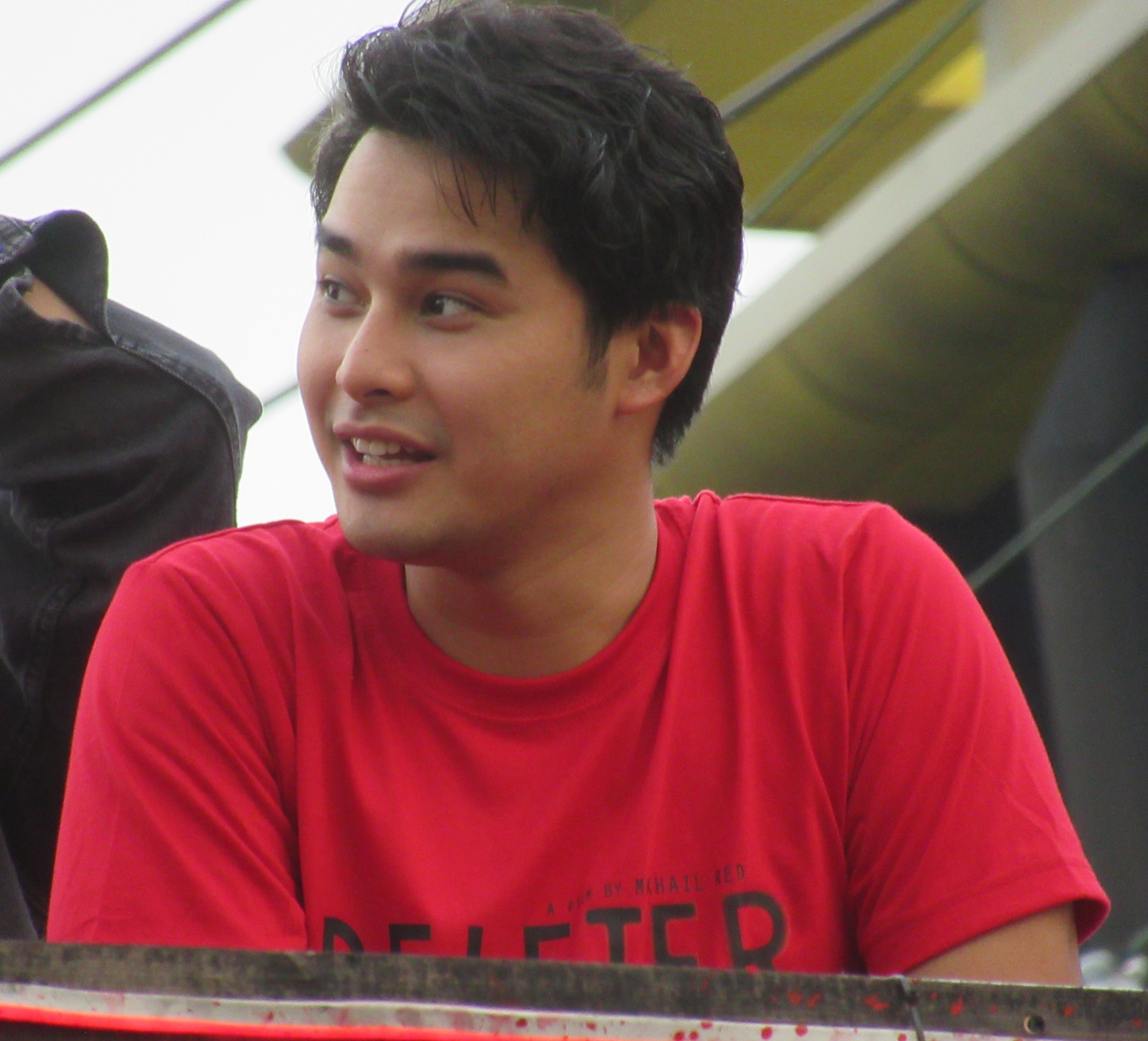
- de Leon at the 2022 Metro Manila Film Festival's Parade of Stars
- Born: Marc Carlos Francis de Jesus de Leon; February 20, 1995 (age 31); Tondo, Manila, Philippines
- Education: San Sebastian College – Recoletos
- Occupations: Actor; dancer; filmmaker
- Years active: 2012–present
- Agent(s): Star Magic (2012–2020); Viva Artists Agency (2020–present); Freelancer (2023–present)
- Television: ABS-CBN (since 2012); ALLTV2 (since 2024); TV5 Network (since 2021); Viva One (since 2023)
- Partner: Elisse Joson
- Children: Felize de Leon (Daughter)

Marc Carlos "McCoy" Francis de Jesus de Leon (born February 20, 1995) is a Filipino actor, dancer, and filmmaker. He is known as a member of #Hashtags, a male-group dance performer on the noontime variety show It's Showtime on ABS-CBN. He is known for his portrayal of Myles in Block Z, Pol in Sakaling Maging Tayo, and David Dimaguiba in FPJ's Batang Quiapo.

In 2025, won the Best Supporting Actor award at the 21st Gawad Tanglaw Awards and was named the TV Supporting Actor of the Year at the 6th VP Choice Awards for his role as David Dimaguiba in FPJ's Batang Quiapo. Won Best Actor for his role as Father Rhoel Gallardo in the biographical film In Thy Name.

== Early life and education ==
De Leon attended high school at San Sebastian College – Recoletos. He attended college with a Bachelor of Science in Civil Engineering at Mapúa University, but decided to drop out of school to pursue his career in the entertainment industry.

== Career ==
In 2016, he joined Pinoy Big Brother: Lucky 7 along with his co-hashtag member Nikko Natividad as a 2-in-1 celebrity housemate. He joined FPJ's Batang Quiapo as one of the main antagonists turned antihero, David Dimaguiba. In 2026, headlines the upcoming international romance-comedy film The Flying Red Balloon as Teng-teng. Directed by Louie Ignacio and co-starring Liezel Lopez, principal photography for the movie is slated for location shoots in Taiwan.

== Personal life ==
De Leon has a daughter with his former screen partner, Elisse Joson. They were in a relationship from 2016 to 2018. After reconciling in 2020, they had their child in 2021, and separated briefly in 2023. In 2025, they broke up again, which Joson confirmed via Instagram Reel. He is a known devotee of the Black Nazarene of Quiapo, participating in image's Traslación every January.

== Filmography ==
=== Film ===
Year	Title	Role	Ref.
2017	Instalado	Victor	
2017	Ang Panday	Caloy	
2018	Sin Island	Jack	
2019	Sakaling Maging Tayo	Apollo "Pol" Patnubay Agbuya	
2019	G!	Sam	
2019	The Heiress	Renz	
2020	D' Ninang	Kali	
2020	Block Z	Myles	
2020	The Mirror		
2022	Yorme: The Isko Domagoso Story	young Scott / Isko / Yorme	
2022	Deleter	Jace	
2025	In Thy Name	Father Rhoel Gallardo	
2026	The Flying Red Balloon	Teng-Teng	

=== Television ===
Year	Title	Role	Notes	Ref.
2012–2014	Be Careful with My Heart	Iñigo Cabanatan		
2015	Nasaan Ka Nang Kailangan Kita	young Carlo Asuncion		
2015	Maalaala Mo Kaya	Junjun	Episode: "Mangga at Bagoong"	
2015	Maalaala Mo Kaya	Classmate	Episode: "Barko"	
2015	Maalaala Mo Kaya	Ian	Episode: "Pink Dress"	
2016	Wansapanataym	Boyong Acosta	Episode: "Tikboyong"	
2016	Pinoy Big Brother: Lucky 7	Housemate		
2016	We Will Survive	Ralph Ataiza		
2016–2020	FPJ's Ang Probinsyano	Juan Pablo "JP" Arevalo		
2017	The Good Son	Oliver "Obet" Reyes-Moreno		
2017	Wansapanataym	Cameo	Episode: "Amazing Ving"	
2017	Maalaala Mo Kaya	Josh	Episode: "Laptop"	
2017	Maalaala Mo Kaya	Mon	Episode: "Saklay"	
2017	Pinoy Big Brother: Lucky 7	Alec	Episode: "Titig ng Pag-ibig"	
2018	Maalaala Mo Kaya	Romel	Episode: "Lambat"	
2018	Ipaglaban Mo	Gio	Episode: "Katiwala"	
2018	Ipaglaban Mo	Greg	Episode: "Hadlang"	
2019	Wansapanataym: Mr Cutepido	Val Cruz		
2019	Project Feb 14	Briccio "Brix" Zamora		
2019	Maalaala Mo Kaya	Earl	Episode: "Stationery"	
2020	24/7	Gerard Capili		
2020	Maalaala Mo Kaya	Kobe	Episode: "Mata"	
2020	Ipaglaban Mo	Marco	Episode: "Carnap"	
2020	Walang Hanggang Paalam	Bernardo "Bernie" Salvador		
2021	Kagat ng Dilim	Otep	Episode: "Toktok"	
2021	Puto	Uno dela Cruz		
2022	The Seniors	Kent		
2022	2 Good 2 Be True	young Fred Borja		
2023	Deadly Love	Benjo		
2023–2025	FPJ's Batang Quiapo	David G. Dimaguiba / Fake Hesus Nazareno “Tanggol” A. Montenegro		
2025	My Husband is a Killer	Alvin		
2026	Someone, Someday	Carlos "Caloy" Toledo		
2026	The Loyalty Game	Joel		

== Accolades ==
Year	Film Awards/ Critics	Awards	Nominated work	Result	Ref.
2016	8th PMPC Star Awards for Music	Dance Album of the Year	#Hashtags album	Won	
2016	Push Awards	Push Tweet and Gram Newcomer	—N/a	Nominated	
2016	Star Cinema Awards	Favorite Breakthrough Loveteam	Pinoy Big Brother	Won	
2016	ASAP Pop Viewers' Choice Awards	Pop Hearthrob	—N/a	Nominated	
2016	ASAP Pop Viewers' Choice Awards	Pop Love Teen with Elisse Joson	Pinoy Big Brother	Nominated	
2017	Pinoy Big Brother: Lucky 7	6th Big Placer with Nikko Natividad	—N/a	Finalist	
2017	2017 Box Office Entertainment Awards	Most Promising Loveteam with Elisse Joson	FPJ's Ang Probinsyano	Won	
2017	2017 Box Office Entertainment Awards	Most Popular Recording/Performing Group	#Hashtags	Won	
2017	PEP'sters Choice Awards	Male Breakout Star of the Year	—N/a	Won	
2018	34th PMPC Star Awards for Movies	Best New Movie Actor of the Year (Tied with Mateo Sanjuan)	Instalado	Won	
2018	49th Guillermo Mendoza Memorial Scholarship Foundation Box Office Entertainment Awards	Most Promising Loveteam of Movies & TV with Elisse Joson	The Good Son	Won	
2019	3rd Pista ng Pelikulang Pilipino	Best Actor	G!	Nominated	
2020	RAWR Awards	Beshie Ng Taon	Block Z	Nominated	
