= Pinoy Big Brother: Lucky 7 =

Pinoy Big Brother: Lucky
- Season 7
- Presented by: Toni Gonzaga; Bianca Gonzalez; Mariel Rodriguez; Robi Domingo
- No. of days: 235
- No. of housemates: 30
- Winner: Maymay Entrata
- Runner-up: Kisses Delavin

Release
- Original network: ABS-CBN
- Original release: July 11, 2016 – March 5, 2017

Season chronology
- ← Previous; 737 Next → Otso

The seventh season of the reality game show Pinoy Big Brother, subtitled Lucky (pronounced as Lucky 7 or Lucky Season 7) aired on ABS-CBN for 235 days from July 11, 2016, to March 5, 2017.

This is the third consecutive special season to air, following All In and 737, but this season still uses the same batch format as with the previous season, with celebrities, teens, and adults being divided into three batches. However, an additional twist was added where all finalists of each batch will then return in the fourth and final batch to compete for a spot in the final. This would later serve as the foundation for the formats of Otso and Kumunity 10, though the former would not feature celebrities like 737 and Kumunity 10.

This season was the first to reach the 200-day mark. It was later surpassed by Otso by 33 days, as well as by Kumunity 10, with this season trailing by only nine.

== Developments ==
The show announced its seventh season on March 30, 2016. On April 3, a Facebook page about Pinoy Big Brother posted a photo of the house and tells its audience to share it for a chance to be an official housemate. The Big Brother staff immediately disowned the promo as fake and reminds its social media followers to always verify their sources.

The official announcement for Lucky Season 7 aired on June 29. On July 2, 2016, during the airing of It's Showtime, Big Brother announced that the season will kick off with the entry of celebrity housemates. Other celebrity housemates were announced in various programs in the succeeding days.

During the transport of the celebrity housemates from the Philippines to Vietnam, three were barred from traveling by immigration officials due to problems with their visa and immigration cards; the three were able to travel the next day.

=== Auditions ===
Cities in the Philippines where the auditions for the seventh season of Pinoy Big Brother were held.
Cities in Europe where the auditions for the seventh season of Pinoy Big Brother were held.

Auditions started on May 21, 2016, and lasted until June 26, 2016. Like the previous two seasons, the auditions for regular and teen housemates were held together. Online auditions opened for overseas aspirants.

The following were the audition schedules. Note that, with the exception of the auditions held overseas, the first day is designated for teen auditions while the second day is designated for regular auditions:

Date	Location	Venue	Source
May 21 and 22, 2016	Quezon City	PBB Covered Court	
May 28 and 29, 2016	Olongapo	Harbor Point Mall	
June 4 and 5, 2016	Batangas City	Batangas City Coliseum	
June 10 and 11, 2016	Calasiao, Pangasinan	Robinsons Place Pangasinan	
June 11 and 12, 2016	Tagbilaran	Alturas Mall	
June 11, 2016	North Yorkshire, U.K.	The Racecourse, Boroughbridge Road Ripon	
June 12, 2016	Milan, Italy	Teatro San Fedel	
June 15 and 16, 2016	Cagayan de Oro	Centrio Mall	
June 17 and 18, 2016	Zamboanga City	KCC Mall de Zamboanga	
June 22 and 23, 2016	General Santos	KCC Mall of GenSan	
June 25 and 26, 2016	Legazpi, Albay	Pacific Mall Legazpi	

=== Other content ===
Daily updates about upcoming episodes are shown twice a day. Pinoy Big Brother: Lucky Season 7 Online airs their episodes on the official website and on their official Facebook and YouTube page on weekdays, sometimes on weekends for after-eviction specials. For three weeks, during the stay of the celebrity housemates, a special show entitled PBB: Mga Kwento ng Celebrity Housemates (then formerly known as PBB Vietnam: Mga Kwento ng Celebrity Housemates when the latter was still in Vietnam) aired. It was then renamed to PBB: Mga Kwento ng Teen Housemates upon the arrival of the teen housemates, and PBB: Mga Kwento ng Housemates ni Kuya upon the teen and regular housemates lived in one house, and then renamed as PBB: Mga Kwento ng Dream Team ni Kuya when the Dream Team housemates entered. Online Bahay ni Kuya returned for viewers to participate and win ₱100,000 at the end of its run.

On February 10, 2017, the show aired its final episode from Kapamilya Gold's afternoon and was replaced by Wildflower block called Pinoy Big Brother Lucky Season 7: Mga Kwentong Dream Team ni Kuya.

== Overview ==
Like 737, this season is divided into batches. However a celebrity batch is added along with the teen and adult batches. The show kicked off with the celebrities. The teen housemates entered next, and the adults to follow last.

=== Episode format ===
For the celebrity batch, housemates have entered a week before the actual premiere, and so the broadcast for these episodes are delayed as opposed to the previous-day format that had been present since the first season. Since the show does not display a day number for each episode, it is assumed that events had happened a week from the actual air date. It is possible that the length of stay of the celebrity housemates is shorter than what is being aired. On July 30, 2016, the celebrity housemates returned to the Philippines to enter the Pinoy Big Brother House, and so the previous-day format returns.

For the first three weeks of the season, the show only aired on weekdays due to the last few episodes of We Love OPM. After their stint in Vietnam, their format went back to air episodes 7 days a week.

=== Hosts ===
Toni Gonzaga, Bianca Gonzalez and Robi Domingo reprised their roles as hosts. Mariel Rodriguez returned as host after her absence since Teen Clash 2010. During the season, Toni Gonzaga and Mariel Rodriguez took a maternity leave due to pregnancy. However, Gonzaga returned as a regular host when the Dream Team housemates entered the house. Maymay Entrata was the winner of this season.

=== Changes ===
- Logo – For the first time since Unlimited, the show had a major logo change for this season. Having a minimalist look, the logo resembles that of the American and Canadian versions while keeping the original Pinoy Big Brother typeface. They have also included a human eye instead of a graphical one that was seen in earlier seasons.
- House – For its first two weeks, the celebrity housemates were sent to the Big Brother House in Vietnam to complete the seven lucky tasks. On Day 17, housemates returned to the Pinoy Big Brother House. The House was inspired by the various scenery in the Philippines.
- Eviction – Evictions take place in a studio in ABS-CBN. Evicted housemates will transfer from the House going to the studio during the commercial break for an interview. Nominations and evictions can happen any day of the week. Ligtask challenges will determine the evicted housemates. Only when there are seven housemates left for each batch and the Dream Team starts, the public will be given the chance to vote.

=== Twists ===
- 2-in-1 Housemate – Hashtags members McCoy de Leon and Nikko Natividad competed as one housemate.
- Lucky 7 Tasks – Housemates will undergo seven tasks, where different rewards can be won.
- Ligtask Challenges – Nominated housemates will undergo several challenges to save themselves from evictions. These will serve as an eviction process for the nominated housemates. Excluding for celebrity batch, as soon as seven housemates remain for each batch and the Dream Team begins, this will serve as challenges where one of the nominated housemates will be saved from eviction.
  - Ligtas Pares Challenges - Pairs will undergo series of Ligtask challenges to save themselves from evictions. The bottom two pairs will face the public vote.
- Big Jump Challenge – Housemates participate in a series of challenges to get a spot to the finale.
- #PBBPadaluck – This hashtag serves as a help for the nominated housemates in their Ligtask challenges. The nominated housemate who gets the most tweets in Twitter involving this hashtag will be given an advantage on the Ligtask. This will end once the lucky seven housemates are complete. This resumes during special tasks for the Dream Team housemates.
- Positive Nominations - Instead of voting to nominate a housemate to evict, housemates will nominate whom they want to save. Housemates receiving the highest nomination points will be saved from nomination. This was carried from the previous season.
- Wildcard Housemate – An evicted housemate will have a chance to come back on the roster of housemates. However, unlike in previous seasons, selected evicted housemates will participate in challenges for the wild card spot.
- Dream Team – Twelve housemates from different batches will compete to become a winner. 4 lucky stars were given to 4 celebrities, 4 lucky suns to 4 teens, and 4 lucky houses to 4 regular adults which made up into one team.
- Dream House Challenge – Housemates will compete to win a dream house.
- Overnight Voting - In some eviction nights, people will only be given 24 hours to vote for their favorite housemate.
- Dream Team Challenges - Remaining Dream Team housemates will be given several challenges. If they win the required number of challenges, seven housemates will be in the Big Night.
- Seven Minute Voting Period - The public will be given 7 minutes only to vote for their favorite housemate.
- Back-to-back Nomination and Eviction – The nomination and eviction will happen on the same day.
- Lucky 7 – Seven housemates advance to the Big Night, competing for the title of the season's Big Winner

== Housemates ==
The Celebrity Housemates of Pinoy Big Brother: Lucky Season 7

The Teen Housemates of Pinoy Big Brother: Lucky Season 7

The Adult Housemates of Pinoy Big Brother: Lucky Season 7

=== Celebrities ===
Before the housemates of each batch officially entered the House, they were introduced in different ABS-CBN programs. They are officially introduced to the show's audience come the night of the show's launch.

From July 2 until July 4, five of the nine celebrity housemates were introduced with the first being two-in-one housemates, the first of its kind since Celebrity Edition 2. They were officially introduced during a live online show on the evening of July 4. As the online show was cut abruptly, events after the show were reported the following days, that the celebrity housemates flew to Vietnam and live in the Vietnamese Big Brother house. This season marks the first time a number of housemates were officially introduced a week before the official premiere. Four more celebrity housemates were revealed on July 6, 2016.

=== Teens ===
The first teen housemate, who was chosen by the celebrity housemates, entered on August 5, 2016. Five male teen housemates entered on August 6, 2016. Six female teen housemates entered the following day.

=== Adults ===
Seven adult housemates entered on Day 108. The last three Adult housemates entered on Day 112.

=== Dream Team ===
On Day 145, Big Brother announced his Dream Team, 12 housemates from different batches will be competing to be the winner.

Name	Age on entry	Hometown	Occupation	Batch	Entered	Exited	Result	Refs.
Dream Team
Maymay Entrata	19	Cagayan de Oro	Student	Teen	Day 23; Day 178	Day 129; Day 235	Winner	
Kisses Delavin	17	Masbate	Student, beauty queen	Teen	Day 25; Day 178	Day 129; Day 235	Runner-up	
Yong Muhajil	16	Zamboanga	Student	Teen	Day 24; Day 178	Day 128; Day 235	3rd Place	
Edward Barber	16	Germany	Student	Teen	Day 24; Day 179	Day 129; Day 235	4th Place	
Tanner Mata	21	Nueva Ecija	Model	Adult	Day 108	Day 234	5th Place	
McCoy de Leon and Nikko Natividad	21 & 23	Tondo (de Leon); Bulacan (Natividad)	Dancers	Celebrity	Day 1 Day 178	Day 24; Day 234	6th Place	
Cora Waddell	26	Bulacan	Fashion model, video blogger	Adult	Day 108; Day 179	Day 177; Day 234	7th Place	
Elisse Joson	20	Mandaluyong	Commercial model	Celebrity	Day 1 Day 178	Day 23; Day 228	Evicted	
Jinri Park	28	South Korea	Gravure idol, cosplayer	Celebrity	Day 2 Day 178	Day 24; Day 220	Evicted	
Nonong Ballinan	29	Quezon City	Actor & comedian	Celebrity	Day 1 Day 178	Day 23; Day 213	Evicted	
Jerome Alacre	32	Tondo	Nurse	Adult	Day 108	Day 206	Evicted	—
Aura Azarcon	24	Las Piñas	Medical intern	Adult	Day 115	Day 199	Evicted	—
Evicted Wildcards
Baninay Bautista	20	Batangas	College student, vendor	Adult	Day 108; Day 179	Day 177; Day 184	Evicted	—
Christian Morones	15	Zamboanga	Student, varsity player	Teen	Day 24; Day 179	Day 112; Day 183	Evicted	
Yassi Pressman	21	Antipolo	Actress & singer	Celebrity	Day 1 Day 180	Day 23; Day 181	Voluntary exit	
Adults
Wil Dasovich	25	Makati	Model, video blogger	Adult	Day 115	Day 177	Evicted	
Luis Hontiveros	24	Taguig	Model, actor	Adult	Day 108	Day 158	Evicted	—
Ali Forbes	24	Bulacan	Singer, beauty queen	Adult	Day 108	Day 148	Evicted	—
Jesi Corcuera	25	Cavite	TV personality	Adult	Day 115	Day 148	Evicted	
Thuy Nguyen	23	Tacloban	Nurse	Adult	Day 108	Day 136	Evicted	
Teens
Vivoree Esclito	16	Bohol	Student, dancer	Teen	Day 25	Day 101	Evicted	
Marco Gallo	15	Italy	Student	Teen	Day 24	Day 95	Evicted	
Kristine Hammond	16	Biñan	Student, varsity player	Teen	Day 25	Day 80	Evicted	
Heaven Peralejo	16	Makati	Student	Teen	Day 25	Day 72	Voluntary exit	
Fenech Veloso	13	Bohol	Student	Teen	Day 25	Day 59	Evicted	
Rita Gaviola	13	Lucena	Student	Teen	Day 25	Day 52	Evicted	
Aizan Perez	14	Batangas	Student	Teen	Day 24	Day 45	Evicted	
Celebrities
Hideo Muraoka	28	Brazil	Model	Celebrity	Day 2	Day 23	Evicted	
JK Labajo	15	Cebu	Actor, singer	Celebrity	Day 2	Day 23	Evicted	
Chacha Balba	28	Tondo	Radio disc jockey	Celebrity	Day 1	Day 11	Voluntary exit	

=== Houseguests ===
The first houseguest from the celebrity batch is Thuy Nguyen, who was born in the Philippines, whose parents is Vietnamese. She participated with the celebrity batch on a series of tasks; more details are available on the Tasks section. Since the Celebrity Housemates succeeded in six tasks; Thuy is declared a regular housemate. Thuy left on Day 16 and has returned for the regular batch on Day 108. Jerome Ponce entered the House on Day 19.

For the teen batch, celebrity housemates JK Labajo, McCoy de Leon, and Elisse Joson entered the House on Day 27. Lola Pina entered on Day 40 as part of the housemates' third Lucky task. On Day 51, celebrity housemates Nikko Natividad and Nonong Ballinan entered the house to accompany the teen housemates on their 5th Lucky Task. On Day 58, Kathryn Bernardo and Daniel Padilla entered the house. On Day 65, Hashtags members, Jameson Blake, Jimboy Martin, McCoy de Leon, Nikko Natividad, Tom Doromal, and Zeus Collins entered the house to accompany the teen housemates on their second weekly task. Liza Soberano entered on that same day and Enrique Gil entered on Day 67. On Day 72, Alex Gonzaga and Joseph Marco entered as hotel guests. On Day 73, Miho Nishida re-entered with her child daughter Aimi, and Tommy Esguerra. On Day 80, two Brazilian models, Maria Fabiana and Stephanie Vaz, entered the House. During the Miss Teen Big Brother 2016 week, Precious Lara Quigaman entered the House to guide Kisses, Maymay, and Vivoree in the task. Angel Locsin, Zanjoe Marudo and Sam Milby also entered the house during the army training task.

For the regular batch, Angelica Panganiban entered the house on Day 118 to help them with their 1st lucky task. Tanner's twin, Tyler entered on Day 132 to help the housemates with their Jenga task. Celebrity housemates Elisse, Hideo, Nonong, and Yassi re-entered the House for the Comedy sketch weekly task.

== Summary of events ==
Note that Day 1 started on July 5 upon the entry of the first five celebrity housemates in the Vietnamese Big Brother House. The official premiere of the show was on July 11 (Day 7). The celebrity housemates left Vietnam on July 20 (Day 16); thereafter, they temporarily return to the outside world. They returned to the Pinoy Big Brother House on July 30; note that the show's official website designated the day they have returned as Day 17.

=== Celebrities ===
On Day 0, Jinri, JK, McCoy, Nikko, and Yassi were introduced as the first five celebrity housemates. As part of the season's twist, they were flown to Ho Chi Minh City, Vietnam on Day 1; however, only McCoy, Nikko and Yassi were only able to depart as Jinri, JK and Hideo (only introduced later in TV Patrol) had visa and immigration card issues. After arriving in Vietnam, McCoy, Nikko and Yassi then entered the Vietnamese Big Brother House along with Chacha, Elisse and Nonong (only introduced later in TV Patrol). Two Vietnamese actors and Thuy entered the House after finishing a task in the outside world; they pretended that they were the current occupants and were the last three housemates of Big Brother Vietnam. On Day 2, Jinri, JK and Hideo were able to resolve the issues and were able to fly to Vietnam; the three entered the House that morning, while being chained and blindfolded. Due to this, the housemates had to unchain them within 30 minutes using the correct 3 keys among the 77 keys scattered around the House; they were successful. On Day 3, Thuy returned; in order to secure her spot as a regular housemate, she was tasked to pretend that she had won Big Brother Vietnam, that she has to temporarily stay as a house guest, and that she has to help them in their special task.

On Day 10, Hideo, Jinri, Yassi and JK were nominated. On Day 11, Chacha decided to voluntarily exit during their first eviction night; note that Hideo was supposedly the one to exit the House after having the poorest performance in the Ligtask challenge.

On Day 15, the housemates have won their 6th and last Lucky task; with this, Thuy revealed her true self. Jinri was temporarily allowed to leave the House due to reasons kept confidential; her exit was not considered as voluntary. In the morning of Day 16, Big Brother toured the housemates in the Mekong River. By the afternoon, after more than two weeks in Vietnam, Big Brother announced that they will be leaving the Vietnamese Big Brother House and will return to the Philippines.

On Day 17, with the exception of JK, the celebrity housemates entered the Pinoy Big Brother House. Later on, Big Brother revealed that only two of them dubbed as Lucky Stars will be able to continue their journey to reach the finale; he also told them that they will encounter many challenges determined by picking a ball among the other Bola ng Kapalaran placed inside a Big Tambiola. Yassi was tasked to choose the first ball; their first task was that they were only allowed to bring one luggage from eight luggage they have; they picked Nonong's luggage. After the entry of the housemates, disguised as a hooded face ninja, Jerome Ponce entered the House as a house guest in order to assist Big Brother in the housemates' challenges and to fix the thing between him and Elisse. On Day 18, Elisse picked the second ball which showed an image of a basket; the image would mean that they will get a basket of eggs, sweet potatoes and bitter gourds as their food. They had to ration it until Big Brother gives them another set of food supplies. Meanwhile, McCoy was informed by Big Brother that the hooded face ninja was Jerome and that he has to help bring him to their bedroom without the female housemates noticing them; he was allowed to tell the task and ask for help with the other male housemates.

On Day 19, McCoy and the other male housemates continued their task in hiding Jerome from the females. Later that day, the female housemates were blind-folded for 4 hours; this gave Jerome the opportunity to freely roam the House. JK returned to the House; he was introduced by Big Brother to Jerome in the Confession Room. He was also told about the male housemates' task. Later on, the still blind-folded female housemates entered the Confession Room one by one; they were tasked to identify JK and Jerome. Each of the female housemates perfectly identified JK; while Jerome was only identified by Elisse. Due to this, JK was able to enter the House; Jerome, who was not able to enter the House, was given the chance to write a letter to Elisse. After Elisse read the letter, she was given the decision whether she would be willing to talk with him. In the early hours of Day 20, she decided to talk and both were able to do so. Their conversation led to the closure to their failed relationship. On Day 22, Jinri won one of the two Lucky Stars granting her to continue in hopes of becoming the big winner of this season. On Day 23, McCoy & Nikko later were revealed to get the last Lucky Star and able to continue with Jinri. The non-finalist celebrity housemates later exited the House.

=== Teens ===
On Day 23, Maymay was introduced as the chosen Lucky Teen Housemate by the celebrity housemates after they won the Lucky 7 Tasks; she later entered the House ahead of the other teen housemates. On Day 24, Big Brother told the Lucky 2 celebrity housemates that they will temporarily be leaving the house on that day and will eventually return on a specified date. In that same day, the male teen housemates entered the house and together with Maymay, Big Brother gave their first task of balancing styroballs, each of which corresponded to a priced grocery item, while rolling it onto a series of planks until it reaches a grocery cart placed on the other side of the activity area. This task will determine their weekly food supply. The female teen housemates then entered the house on Day 25.

On Day 27, the teen housemates started their first lucky task, which turned out to be successful. On Day 30, former celebrity housemates, Elisse and McCoy entered the Big Brother house as house guests. This is to prepare the teen housemates for their SwerTeen Ball. The male teen housemates were asked to draw lots for their partner on the SwerTeen Ball, the aftermath left Kisses and Vivoree without one. So, they requested Big Brother to do significant roles for the ball; Kisses to host, and Vivoree for a song number. This was all concluded in the SwerTeen Ball on Day 32, the teen housemates showcased their talents and skills in singing, dancing, and playing instruments. Vivoree was greeted by a special guest, JK, to play her composition for the song number. Note that JK became a celebrity housemate as well.

On Day 33, a romantic date was set up for house guests McCoy and Elisse. The teen housemates' second lucky task occurred on Day 34. The passed task led to a family reunion for Rita. The 1st Teen Nomination Night was witnessed on Day 39, which left Aizan, Christian, and Kisses nominated. On Day 40, they were visited by an elderly woman, Lola Pina, from the Kanlungan ni Maria - Home for the Aged. This was in line with their third lucky task. The result of their task was a failure and it was revealed on Day 45.

Also on Day 43, the 1st Teen Eviction Night occurred. This left Aizan as the first evictee of the teen batch. On that same night, the housemates cast their nominations but it was announced the following night. On Day 44, the 2nd Teen Nomination Night immediately took place. In this particular week, Christian, Heaven, Kristine, and Rita were nominated. Their 4th Lucky Task was revealed on Day 45. On Day 47, Maymay temporarily left the house due to the death of her grandfather. On Day 48, Edward was visited by his father to inform him of his grandmother's passing. Later that night, a family reunion took place for Yong due to the success of their 4th Lucky Task.

On Day 49, Maymay returned to the house. Later that night, the 2nd Teen Eviction Night occurred making Rita the second evictee. The 3rd Teen Nomination Night immediately occurred the following day, Day 50, and Christian, Fenech, Heaven, Kisses, and Marco were nominated. On Day 51, former celebrity housemates Nikko Natividad and Nonong Ballinan entered the house to facilitate the teen housemates on their fifth lucky task, which also revealed on the same day. The teen housemates passed the task and as a bonus, the proceeds of their task will go to the alms for Maymay's grandfather, who died of a heart attack. On Day 56, Fenech got evicted on the 3rd Teen Eviction Night.

On Day 58, Kapamilya stars Kathryn Bernardo and Daniel Padilla entered the house. They, together with the teen housemates, imitated scenes from the duo's movie, Barcelona: A Love Untold. The 4th Teen Nomination Night happened four days after the 3rd Teen Eviction Night (Day 60), and Christian, Heaven, and Kisses, are nominated for the week. Big Brother gave the nominees a condition wherein if they succeed their first-ever weekly task (Paliga ni Kuya), none of them will be put into threat for eviction, but if they fail, the eviction process will still continue.

The teen housemates failed their first weekly task and as a result, the eviction process for Christian, Heaven, and Kisses will still continue. On Day 64, Maymay, accompanied by Edward, went to Camiguin for her grandfather's burial. On Day 65, Hashtags members (Jameson Blake, Jimboy Martin, McCoy de Leon, Nikko Natividad, Tom Doromal, and Zeus Collins), who were once PBB housemates, entered the house to accompany the teen housemates on their second weekly task. On the same day, Kapamilya actress Liza Soberano entered the house as a houseguest and had an extraordinary date with the male teen housemates. On Day 67, Kapamilya actor Enrique Gil entered the house and had a memorable date with Maymay, who the latter is her ultimate celebrity crush.

On Day 70, Heaven decided to make a voluntary exit, due to her mother's wish to see to her as she recovers from a brain operation. This made Christian and Kisses safe from eviction. On Day 71, the teen housemates participated in Hashtags': The Road Trip Concert. To pass the weekly task, they must earn 70% of the approval of the audience. After the performance, they learned of the result in which they got 94% of the audience's approval; this made them pass their second weekly task. On the same day, the 5th Teen Nomination Night occurred, and Christian, Kristine, and Vivoree were nominated for eviction.

On Day 72, Big Brother announced their third weekly task wherein the housemates became hotel personnel in the PBB Hotel. Celebrities, Alex Gonzaga, Joseph Marco, and former housemates Tommy Esguerra, Miho Nishida and her daughter Aimi were the house guests in the PBB Hotel. With the help of Marco's mother, they passed their weekly task.

On Day 77, the 5th Teen Eviction Night occurred and Kristine got evicted in the house. The next day, Kuya proposed an international pageant called Miss Teen Big Brother 2016 as their fourth weekly task. The following, Kisses, Maymay, and Vivoree are the contestants. In Day 80, two Brazilian models, Maria Fabiana and Stephanie Vaz, entered the house as house players for the pageant. The pageant was held on Day 84 but it was aired for 3 days. Maria won the pageant which resulted in the failure of their fourth weekly task.

On Day 87, the housemates had their face-to-face nomination, which resulted in Kisses, Marco and Vivoree being nominated for that week. On Day 88, their 6th lucky task was revealed which made the teen housemates undergo army training. Their task occurred outside the house and it resulted in a success. On Day 92, Marco left the house on the 6th Teen Eviction Night.

On Day 94, the teen housemates had their second face-to-face nomination resulting in Kisses, Vivoree and Yong being nominated. On Day 96, the remaining housemates started their 7th and final lucky task. On Day 97, Big Brother announced the Big Jump Challenge and only three housemates can participate. Christian and Yong chose to participate in the challenge and the remaining housemates continued with their 7th lucky task. On Day 98, Vivoree was evicted on the 7th Teen Eviction Night.

On Day 100, their last weekly task was announced which they later on passed. On that same day, Edward won the third flag making him the last challenger on the Big Jump Challenge. On Day 102, Christian, Edward, and Yong faced an inquiry wherein they answered a series of questions asked by their fellow housemates, ex-housemates and from social media. This inquiry will be a great help on their Big Jump Challenge.

On Day 104, the Big Jump Challenge occurred which resulted to Edward getting the first lucky sun.

=== Adults ===
On Day 105, the first seven Adult housemates entered the house. They started their first day in the activity area which was set-up as a cemetery. Their first task was given that day—the first six Adults must work together to find the keys hidden in the cemetery to free Tanner, the seventh adult housemate, who was mummified by the teen housemates, from being chained and locked. On Day 109, the adult housemates were able to finally enter the house with the help from the remaining teen housemates.

On Day 110, they started their first weekly task, which turned out to be successful and as a bonus, the adult housemates were able to give the remaining teen housemates, ₱10,000 each as a Christmas gift. On Day 112, international vocal trio, SWV entered the house as house guests. Later that night, Christian, with the lowest percentage of votes, got evicted from the PBB House on the 8th Teen Eviction Night. The last three Adult housemates, Aura, Jesi, and Wil entered the house on that same night but was not introduced yet to the housemates inside the house. On that same night, Jesi was also given a secret task which is to hide his identity.

On Day 113, Aura was able to meet the housemates inside the house. On Day 114, their first lucky task was revealed. The remaining teen housemates went to Baguio to buy the clothes needed on their task. Also on that same day, Jesi entered the house as PJ, to hide his identity with the housemates. On Day 115, Wil met the housemates and he announced that Big Brother will have a pool party. On Day 117, the teen housemates returned to the Big Brother house.

On Day 118, celebrity actress, Angelica Panganiban entered the house as a houseguest to give some advice with their lucky task. On Day 119, Jesi revealed his true identity granting him immunity from the first adult nomination. On Day 120, Big Brother announced that the housemates passed their first lucky task and later that night, with the highest percentage of votes, Kisses took the 2nd lucky sun leaving Maymay and Yong fighting for the 3rd lucky sun through public voting.

On Day 122, their second lucky task was revealed. On Day 123, Ali and Tanner were given an outside task to become a garbage collector to collect more bottles needed for their lucky task. On Day 124, Ali, Cora, Tanner and Wil went to Payatas to collect more bottles. Later that day, due to Ali's success on her secret task, she was able to see her long lost sister, Lea. On Day 125, Big Brother announced that the housemates passed their second lucky task and later that night, with the highest percentage of votes, Maymay took the 3rd lucky sun making Yong the last evictee for their batch. The last three teens temporarily bid farewell to the adult housemates on Day 126 and will eventually return soon.

On Day 127, the 1st Adult Nomination Night occurred and Cora, Luis, Thuy at Wil was the first set of nominees for their batch. On Day 129, the housemates became superheroes for their weekly task. On Day 131, due to Wil's success on his secret task, Luis was able to hear his father's voice after a long time. On Day 132, Luis set up a Thanksgiving dinner for Wil and his family in the United States. Later that day Tanner's twin, Tyler, entered the house and was given a secret task to switch places with Tanner as a housemate without the other housemates noticing.

On Day 133, the 1st Adult Eviction Night occurred, and with the least time to finish the Ligtask Challenge, Thuy, left the house. On Day 136, the Double Trouble Challenge started, wherein the adult housemates were split into two teams: the Red Team (Ali, Cora, Jesi, Luis, and Wil) and the Blue Team (Aura, Baninay, Jerome, Tanner, and Tyler). They must win two out of the three Double Trouble Challenges to gain immunity from nomination, while the losing team will face nomination, and two members from their team will get evicted. The Red Team won the first challenge (Sumo Wars), while the Blue Team won the last two challenges (Rubik's Cube Tower and Tensyon Trouble). This, then, makes the Blue Team immune from nomination, and the Red Team to face eviction.

At the same time, Big Brother also gave them their fourth and fifth lucky tasks, which is to only have 16 hours of sleep in a span of five days. They won both tasks. On Day 147, house guest Tyler left the house. On Day 145, a special Double Eviction occurred, and Jesi and Ali got evicted from the house after gaining the lengthiest time from their Ligtask Challenge. After this, the remaining adult housemates were hereby proclaimed as the Lucky 7 Adult Housemates.

Following the adult housemates' victory in five lucky tasks, they have earned the opportunity to pass on their luck through the season’s ultimate twist, the Dream Team. The group of 12 fortunate housemates will compete for the title of Big Winner . It comprises the Lucky Celebrity Stars and the Lucky Teen Suns. With 5 of the 12 positions already filled, the next member will be selected from the lucky celebrity housemates. Their fifth victory will allow them to pass their luck to one of the eligible celebrity housemates : Elisse, Hideo, Nonong, and Yassi. However, JK is disqualified from the twist due to prior commitments.

On Day 154, Wil, Aura, and Luis were nominated in a positive face-to-face nomination that occurred. Aura eventually won the ligtask challenge. Also, Big Brother announced that there will be only an overnight voting and the one who will get the lowest votes will be evicted. On Day 155, Luis was evicted from the house.

On Day 169, Tanner got the first lucky house after winning the Big Jump Challenge. On Day 173, Baninay and Wil were transferred to a white isolated room with a red buzzer that they can press to give up their chance for the third lucky house and automatically voluntary exiting. They had to do different tasks to get food and other necessities. On Day 171, Aura got the second lucky house after receiving the highest percentage of text votes. As a result, Cora and Jerome were also transferred to the white room. They left the white room on Day 172. On Day 174, the lucky seven teen housemates were asked of who would they pick to be the third lucky house after reviewing several challenges the regulars faced. Jerome eventually got the third lucky house after having more votes from the teens than Cora, Wil, and Baninay, who were evicted.

=== Dream Team ===
On Day 175, the 3 lucky stars— Jinri, 2-in-1 housemates, McCoy and Nikko, Nonong and the 3 lucky suns— Edward, Kisses, and Maymay re-entered the Big Brother house. Big Brother also announced that he would pick the two recipients of a wildcard slot for each batch. On Day 176, Elisse, Christian, Yong, Cora, and Baninay re-entered the house for a chance to enter the dream team. Yassi followed them the next day. They would face each other in a challenge to determine the fourth lucky star, sun, and house. On Day 177, Yassi gained the fourth lucky star after winning their challenge against Elisse by having the fastest time. On Day 178, Yassi entered the main house again but eventually decided to leave and pass her "luck" or spot in the Dream Team to Elisse due to her prior commitments. Elisse entered the house again and gained the fourth lucky star.

== Tasks ==
=== Lucky 7 tasks ===
On July 8, it was announced that the celebrity housemates will do seven tasks in Vietnam, with then house guest Thuy Nguyen. If they pass six out of seven tasks, Thuy will be an adult housemate for the next batch; if they pass five out of seven, the celebrity housemates can pick a teen auditionee to become an official teen housemate for the next batch. Sometimes, these serve as weekly tasks.

The teen housemates were also given seven lucky tasks. If they pass five out of seven tasks, they will have a chance to pick an adult housemate for the next batch. If they pass six out of seven, there will be three finalists instead of two. Their first five tasks also served as their weekly tasks, after which they did regular weekly tasks until the Lucky 7 housemates were formed.

The adult housemates were also given seven tasks. If they pass five out of seven, they'll be able to pass their luck to one of the celebrity housemates.

Task No.	Date given	Task title and description	Result
Celebrities
1	July 7 (Day 3)	May Tatlong Bibe (Three Ducklings); Part 1: The housemates had to translate the Filipino children's song "May Tatlong Bibe" to English and teach it to several Vietnamese children. The housemates are only given three chances. Part 2: The song must be taught in Brazilian Portuguese by Hideo, in Vietnamese by Thuy, in Korean by Jinri, and in Cebuano by JK to their respective pairs.	Passed
2	July 9 (Day 5)	Vietnamese Water Puppets; The housemates must portray a story using a water puppet or the traditional Vietnamese theater art. Vietnamese experts will judge if their work passed or failed.	Passed
3	July 11 (Day 7)	Ride the Ostrich; Done at the Mango Garden Resort in Biên Hòa, male celebrity housemates will have to ride ostriches. For every 15 seconds of riding an ostrich, they will earn one basket. They need to collect seven baskets; thereby needing to earn one minute and 45 seconds in order to win the task.	Passed
4	July 12 (Day 8)	Crocodile Feeding; Done at the Mango Garden Resort, female housemates must retrieve five out of the seven baskets scattered inside a crocodile pen using five bamboo poles given to them; the bamboo poles also carry meat baits hanged onto them. If ever a crocodile grabs a meat bait, that would mean that they are not allowed to use that pole anymore; if all the five bamboo poles were grabbed by the crocodiles, they will fail the task. The female housemates must collect all seven baskets in order to win the task.	Passed
5	July 16 (Day 12)^{1}	Street Dancing; Housemates are divided into two groups, and must perform three dances. They have to invite passers-by to watch their performances. Each viewer will put a bamboo card inside the box of a housemate they like the most, and inside a red box if they did not like the performance, which will be deducted to the accumulated bamboo cards for all housemates. They must accumulate 100 bamboo cards to succeed.	Failed
6	July 18 (Day 14)	Part 1: Street Food Selling; Housemates are divided into three groups. The first group have 30 minutes to buy ingredients to make Vietnamese coffee and 250 spring rolls. The second group will have to prepare the food. In order to win this task, they must make 250 spring rolls and pass Big Brother's standards to be able to sell it.	Passed
7	July 19 (Day 15)	Part 2: Street Food Selling; The third group will have to go out of the House and sell 250 spring rolls. They must accumulate 2.5 million Vietnamese đồng (₱5,200) from selling spring rolls.	Passed
Teens
1	August 11 (Day 29)	Sayaw sa Gawgaw; Housemates will form a four-part choreography to the tune of "Just Got Lucky". They will have to perform their dance on top of an Oobleck-filled stage without sinking to win the task.	Passed
2	August 18 (Day 36)	Rita's House; The male housemates must imitate Rita's house. With help from Rita's dad, Danny, they must be able to mostly imitate Rita's house to win the task.	Passed
3	August 24 (Day 42)^{2}	88 Minutes of Laugh; The housemates must make Nanay Pina laugh for 88 minutes.	Failed
4	August 29 (Day 47)	PHILIPPINE MAP RUBRICS CUBE; The housemates must make a map of the Philippines using a Rubik's Cube.	Passed
5	September 5 (Day 54)	Pak Salern; The housemates must build a salon business, they must accumulate ₱20,000 in order to win the task.	Passed
6	October 12 (Day 91)	Army Training; The Lucky 7 housemates must become army cadets for the rest of the week, If they win the task they have a chance to choose an aspiring regular auditionee to become an official regular housemate for the next batch.	Passed
7	October 20 (Day 99)	Domino Tower; The remaining housemates must build a domino tower. They must defend their tower from the ninjas and obstacles that tends to destroy it. If they win the task 3 teen housemates will enter the finale instead of 2.	Passed
Adults
1	November 10 (Day 120)	Okay na Ukay ni Kuya; The adult and the remaining teen housemates must sell clothes that they have altered. They must earn ₱20,000 to win the task.	Passed
2	November 15 (Day 125)	Parol ni Kuya; The housemates must make 7 giant parols made from recycled plastic bottles. They must be able to light them to win the task.	Passed
3	November 20 (Day 130)	Tower of Blocks; The housemates must make a 24-layer tower block from an 8-layer block. The tower must remain standing until sunset for them to win the task.	Passed
4	November 29 (Day 139)	16 Hours of Sleep; The Red and Blue Team must not exceed in 16 hours of sleep allowed by Big Brother for the rest of the week. The time began to decrease as soon as one housemate closes his/her eyes and stops when everyone has their eyes open.	Passed
5	November 29 (Day 139)	16 Hours of Sleep; The Red and Blue Team must not exceed in 16 hours of sleep allowed by Big Brother for the rest of the week. The time began to decrease as soon as one housemate closes his/her eyes and stops when everyone has their eyes open.	Passed
6	December 19 (Day 159)	Christmas Presentation; With the help of some kids, the housemates must make an interpretative dance about the birth of Jesus with the tune of ABS-CBN's Christmas Station ID Isang Pamilya Tayo Ngayong Pasko	Passed
7	December 28 (Day 168)	2017 Continuous Jumps; The housemates except for Tanner and Aura must make 2017 continuous jumps using a regular jumping rope. If they fail the task, one housemate will leave the house.	Passed

1. Chacha was still in the House when the task was performed. The episode for this task aired on July 25, 2016. The celebrity housemates only received 97 bamboo cards.
2. The teen housemates made Nanay Pina laugh for about 51 minutes only.

=== Weekly tasks ===
For the teens, adults, and Dream Team housemates, Big Brother gave regular weekly tasks, which had no bearing to the Lucky 7 tasks.

Task No.	Date given	Task title and description	Result
Teens
1	September 15 (Day 64)	PALIGA NI KUYA; The housemates must participate in volleyball and basketball games, they must win the task in order for Kisses, Heaven, and Christian to be save from eviction.	Failed
2	September 19 (Day 68)	Dance Choreography; The housemates must participate in the Dance Class by It's Showtime's Kilig Ambassadors Hashtags. They must earn 70% of audience approval in order to win the weekly task	Passed
3	September 26 (Day 75)	PBB Hotel; The housemates must become a hotel personnel to the newly open PBB Hotel	Passed
4	October 2 (Day 81)	Miss Teen PBB 2016; The girl housemates must compete in a beauty pageant where they will compete with the international teen girls from various Teen Big Brother franchise around the world.: Housemate/Houseguests name / Title Won; Maria Fabiana / Miss Teen PBB 2016 Winner; Kisses / 1st Runner-up; Best in Sportswear; Maymay / 2nd Runner-up; Miss Congeniality; Miss Photogenic; Vivoree / Best in Talent; Stephanie Vaz / Best in Long Gown	Failed
5	October 24 (Day 103)	ZomBig Brother Breakout; The housemates must learn how to walk and talk like a zombie and must participate in the ZomBig Brother Breakout as zombies	Passed
Adults
1	November 3 (Day 113)	Floating Christmas Sled; The housemates must make a floating sled using bamboo and other pieces of wood. Once made, all of them must ride the floating sled in a span of 3 hours. While they are all on board, Tanner has to sing "Pinoy Ako" completely.	Passed
2	December 9 (Day 149)	PBB Comedy Show; With the help of returning celebrities, the remaining housemates must make a comedy sketch video that will be posted in the official Facebook page of the show. They must accumulate 7,000 shares in the posted videos in order to win the task.	Passed
3	January 2 (Day 173)	PBB Dream Team Symbol; Using nails and threads, the remaining housemates must follow a pattern to create an artwork symbolizing the three batches of the season.	Passed
Dream Team
1	January 14 (Day 185)	Hula Hoop Exhibition; Using a regular hula hoop, the Dream Team housemates must make an exhibition of the hula hoop through the hips of the housemate and passed through the other in a continuous manner.	Passed
2	January 16 (Day 187)	Dream Team Cheer Leading Squad; The Dream Team must learn seven cheer dancing moves and perform a cheer dance routine.	Passed
3	January 23 (Day 194)	Lucky Balloon Dragon; The Dream Team must create a balloon dragon and they must be able to move it through a spiky obstacle course while some of them are blindfolded. They must be able to finish the obstacle without popping more than 21 balloons to win the task.	Failed
4	February 1 (Day 203)	Popsicle Tower; The Dream Team must build 4 Popsicle towers on a platform in the middle of the swimming pool without going in it. They must be able to place the Popsicle roof on top of the 4 towers without falling to win the task.	Passed

== Challenges ==
=== Ligtask ===
The evictee will be determined by participating in a challenge. The nominee who loses the challenges becomes evicted. While the public cannot vote to save the nominees until seven housemates are left, they can give an advantage to one nominee by using Twitter hashtags given by the show. The nominee with the highest hashtag count will be given an advantage for their challenge. This rule did not apply to the celebrity housemates. From the Lucky 7 housemates in each batch except Celebrity batch, nominated housemates had to compete in challenges in order to save themselves from eviction. In case of ties, no one will be saved.

Task No.	Date given	Task description	Nominees	Result
Celebrities
1	July 15 (Day 11)	Nominees must eat two out of three exotic dishes in the fastest time possible. The nominee with the longest time gets evicted.	Hideo; Jinri; JK; Yassi	~~Hideo~~^{1} 15 minutes, 9 seconds
Teens^{2}
1	August 27 (Day 45)	Nominees must unlock a series of gates by answering a question correctly and using the key of the correct answer to open the next gate. Once they reach the last gate, they must ring the bell to signal that they're done. The nominee with the longest time to finish the task gets evicted.	Aizan; Christian; Kisses	Aizan; 3 minutes, 4 seconds
2	September 3 (Day 52)	Nominees must build a tower using Rubik's cubes. They must choose a base on which the tower will be built. They only have ten minutes to build a tower. The nominee with the lowest tower is evicted.	Christian; Heaven; Kristine; Rita	Rita; 13 cubes
3	September 10 (Day 59)	Nominees must play a memory game about the salon's equipment. They must choose the numbers with the same item to pass. There are 50 numbers. The nominee with the longest time to finish the task gets evicted.	Christian; Fenech; Heaven; Kisses; Marco	Fenech; 13 minutes, 4 seconds
4	October 1 (Day 80)	Nominees and their partners must memorize the placement of different things inside the Big Brother Hotel room. They must put seven items from the room to the luggage while blindfolded. Once the seven items are inside the luggage, and the luggage is closed, then the timer will stop. The nominee with the longest time to finish the task is evicted.	Christian; Kristine; Vivoree	Kristine; 4 minutes, 50 seconds
5	October 16 (Day 95)	Nominees must put seven crowns on the mannequin after balancing through an obstacle course. The nominee with the fastest time will be saved from eviction.	Christian; Kisses; Marco; Vivoree	Christian; 5 minutes, 28 seconds
6	October 22 (Day 101)	The remaining housemates are nominated. Each of the housemates should place each ball to the box of fellow housemates. The three housemates with the most balls in their respective boxes will face the public vote.	Christian; Edward; Kisses; Maymay; Vivoree; Yong	Edward; 1 ball Maymay; 2 balls Christian; 37 balls
Adults^{3}
1	November 26 (Day 136)	Nominees must save all the stuffed toys in the burning forest while facing three obstacle courses. The nominee with the longest time gets evicted.	Cora; Luis; Thuy; Wil	Thuy; 6 minutes, 24 seconds
2	December 8 (Day 148)	Nominees must memorize and arrange the Rubik's cubes according to the pattern given. There are seven different patterns and must be placed and arranged at a station one at a time. Two nominees with the longest time gets evicted.	Ali; Cora; Jesi; Luis; Wil	Ali; 14 minutes, 28 seconds Jesi; 15 minutes, 25 seconds
3	December 17 (Day 157)	Nominees must roll balls until the end of two slightly slanted poles to get points. The housemate with the most points will be saved from eviction.	Aura; Luis; Wil	Aura; 18 points
Dream Team
1	January 21 (Day 192)	The nominees must create a pyramid of wooden blocks while balancing it on a table supported by a piece of rope. First housemate to finish the challenge will be saved from eviction.: Challenge / Housemate / Winner; 1st Face-off / Aura vs. Jerome / Jerome; 2nd Face-off / Jinri vs. Tanner / Tanner; Final Face-off / Jerome vs. Tanner / Tanner	Aura; Jinri; Jerome; Tanner	Tanner
2	January 29 (Day 200)	The nominees will take turns in popping their balloons mounted on a nomination board. They each have 10 balloons and 5 attempts to pop them. The housemate with the least balloons remaining will be saved from eviction. Each color corresponds to the balloon that they popped.: Challenge / Tanner / Jerome / Nikko / Cora; 1st Round / Tanner / Missed / Missed / Missed; 2nd Round / Tanner / Jerome / Tanner / Tanner; 3rd Round / Cora / Jerome / Cora / Cora; 4th Round / Tanner / Missed / Missed / Missed; 5th Round / Missed / Nikko/Cora / Missed / Missed; Balloons Remaining / 5 / 8 / 9 / 6	Cora; Jerome; Nikko; Tanner	Tanner; 5 balloons
3	February 6–10 (Days 208-212)	Ligtas Pares Challenges; In pairs, the remaining dream team will face 4 ligtask challenges for the whole week. The scoring will be a point system. The first placer will get 5 points while the last placer will get 1 point. The 2 pairs who will get the lowest number of total points will be automatically nominated while the 3 pairs with highest total points will be safe.: Challenge / CorNer / JiNong / KissYong / MayWard / McLisse; Challenge 1 / 4 / 2 / 1 / 3 / 5; Challenge 2 / 2 / 1 / 5 / 4 / 3; Challenge 3 / 5 / 1 / 2 / 3 / 4; Challenge 4 / 4 / 2 / 3 / 5 / 1; Total Score / 15 / 6 / 11 / 15 / 13	Cora & Tanner; Jinri & Nonong; Kisses & Yong; Maymay & Edward; Elisse, McCoy & Nikko	Cora & Tanner; 15 points Maymay & Edward; 15 points Elisse, McCoy & Nikko; 13 points

1. Chacha opted for a voluntary exit; Hideo, consequently, became safe.
2. The columns in red are still the pre-Lucky 7 Teens, while those in yellow are already the Lucky 7 Teens.
3. The columns in red are still the pre-Lucky 7 adults, while those in yellow are already the Lucky 7 Adults.

=== Big Jump Challenge ===
Housemates had to participate in various challenges in order to continue and fight the journey to reach the finale. Highlighted in green are the Big Jump Challenge winners.

Task No.	Date given	Task title and description	Winner(s)
Celebrities
1	August 3 (Day 21)	Game of Throws; With the aid of one of their family members, the housemates have to shoot 20 balls to any of the eight towers of different heights placed across the activity area. Each tower corresponds to a certain number of points. The three housemates with the highest points earned will advance to the next challenge. Note that for McCoy & Nikko, one of them has to sit out for the task.: Housemate / Aided by (relationship) / Points; Elisse / Dr. Christine Joson (mother) / 102 points; Hideo / Fatima Rabago (spouse) / 140 points; Jinri / Joy Park (mother) / 140 points; JK / Louie Stephan Labajo (brother) / 56 points; McCoy / Sheila de Leon (mother) / 143 points; Nonong / Waldiamar Balinan (father) / 98 points; Yassi / Issa Pressman (sister) / 108 points	Hideo; Jinri; McCoy & Nikko
2	August 4 (Day 22)	Balloons; The housemates who advanced must hold a balloon below their hands, six inches above a pile of needles. The housemate who stays put the longest wins. Housemates who were left out from the first game has to give a badge to the competing housemates. The competing housemate with the most badge will have a 7-minute rest from the start.	Jinri
Teens
1	October 18 (Day 97)	Big Jump Challenge Flags; The housemates were given three flags. The housemate who will get the flag will not be able to help on their 7th lucky task but will be given a chance to compete on the Big Jump Challenge.	Christian; Yong
2	October 21 (Day 100)	The 3rd Flag; The housemate must search for the seven keys located all over the house filled with blind zombies. They must be able to unlock the flag and bring it to the garden area. The housemate with the fastest time to finish the task wins the third flag and will compete with Christian and Yong for the Big Jump Challenge.	Edward
3	October 28 (Day 107)	Electric Wire Maze and Puzzle; The housemates must surpass the electric maze given by Big Brother. If they finish it they will solve the 100 pieces puzzle whosoever first solve the puzzle wins.	Edward
Adults
1	December 26 (Day 166)	Ranking Nominations; Big Brother asked the housemates to rank their housemates including themselves from 1 to 6. 1 being the most deserving to be the big winner and six being the least. Those who ranked themselves as 1st in rank were given a chance by Big Brother to compete on the Big Jump Challenge.: / Cora / Wil / Jerome / Baninay / Tanner / Aura; Aura / 4 / 4 / 4 / 1 / 3 / 1; Baninay / 6 / 6 / 5 / 4 / 5 / 4; Cora / 2 / 5 / 2 / 5 / 6 / 6; Jerome / 1 / 2 / 3 / 2 / 2 / 3; Tanner / 5 / 1 / 1 / 3 / 1 / 2; Wil / 3 / 3 / 6 / 6 / 4 / 5	Aura; Tanner
2	December 27 (Day 167)	Balloon Challenge; The housemates must throw three balloons and must keep them in the air for as long as possible. They have unlimited tries but they only have 2017 seconds to do it. Big Brother will only count to their last play so once a balloon touches the ground, they could either try again if they think they can do longer or stop. The housemate with the longest time to keep the balloons from touching the ground will be joining Aura and Tanner for the Big Jump Challenge	Wil; 11 minutes, 38 seconds
3	December 29 (Day 169)	The 3 Lucky Challenges; The housemates will fight on 3 challenges to earn points. The housemate with the most points win.: Rounds / Tanner / Aura / Wil / Winner; 1st Round (20 points) / 168 pts. / 62 pts. / N/A / Tanner (20 pts.); 2nd Round (30 points) / 1st / 2nd / 3rd / Tanner (30 pts.); 3rd Round (50 points) / 3rd / 1st / 2nd / Aura (50pts.); Tie Breaker / 36:10 minutes / 91:55 minutes / Eliminated / Tanner	Tanner

=== Double Trouble Challenge ===
On Day 139, it was announced that the adult housemates will undergo a Double Trouble task wherein they will be divided into two teams. They will compete each other on series of challenges. The team with most wins will be saved from double eviction while the other team will be nominated. They will also have 2-in-1 lucky task during the double trouble week.

Blue Team	Red Team
Tanner; Tyler; Baninay; Jerome; Aura	Cora; Wil; Luis; Ali; Jesi

Task No.	Date given	Task Title and Description	Winning Team
1	November 29 (Day 139)	Sumo Wars	Red Team
2	December 3 (Day 143)	Rubik's Cube Tower	Blue Team
3	December 4 (Day 144)	Tensyon Trouble: Red Team / Blue Team; 5 hours, 2 minutes, and 59 seconds / 9 hours, 57 minutes, and 7 seconds	Blue Team

=== 4th Lucky Spot Challenge ===
On Day 179, Big Brother announced that there will be 3 more additional spots on the Dream Team. He decided who among the evicted housemate per batch will have a chance to become a finalist again. He selected 2 housemates per batch and only 1 housemate will become a member of the Dream Team. It would be Yassi vs. Elisse for celebrities, Christian vs. Yong for teens and Cora vs. Baninay for the adults.

Batch	Date given	Housemate	Aided by	Challenge Description	Winner
Celebrities	January 10 (Day 178)	Elisse	McCoy; Edward	Yassi and Elisse must guide the blindfolded male housemates through seven stations to get stick parts for them to reach the crown. First person to assemble the stick and reach the crown will win the 4th lucky star.	~~Yassi~~^{1} 13 minutes Elisse; Reinstated
Celebrities	January 10 (Day 178)	Yassi	Tanner; Jerome; Nonong	Yassi and Elisse must guide the blindfolded male housemates through seven stations to get stick parts for them to reach the crown. First person to assemble the stick and reach the crown will win the 4th lucky star.	~~Yassi~~^{1} 13 minutes Elisse; Reinstated
Teens	January 12 (Day 180)	Christian	Aura; Edward; Jinri; Nikko	On the first face-off, Christian and Yong was given ten large coins with their respective colors and faces each. They must flip it to their side to gain advantage. The aiding housemates can help them until the last minute. The housemate with the most coins after the given amount of time wins and gains an advantage on the second face-off where they need to hang a short rope with two tennis balls attached at both ends on the three layers of sticks with corresponding points by throwing it. The housemate with the most points after they run out of attempts gets the 4th lucky sun.: Games / Christian / Yong / Winner; 1st Face-off / 9 points / 11 points / Yong; 2nd Face-off / 9 points / 10 points / Yong	Yong; 2 games win
Teens	January 12 (Day 180)	Yong	Elisse; Jerome; Kisses; Maymay; Nonong; Tanner		Yong; 2 games win
Adults	January 13 (Day 181)	Baninay	Aura; Jerome; Jinri; Maymay; McCoy; Nikko; Tanner; Yong	Baninay and Cora will face off in an obstacle course where they will have to put a cup of water on their head while enduring different obstacle courses for 15 minutes, after the 15th minute, the aiding housemates will serve as a human clock where they will stand in a clock and do some jumping jacks. This will serve as an additional time for Baninay and Cora. The housemate with the largest amount of water collected at the end will get the 4th lucky house.	Cora; 40.5 cm
Adults	January 13 (Day 181)	Cora	Edward; Elisse; Kisses (McCoy); Nonong	Baninay and Cora will face off in an obstacle course where they will have to put a cup of water on their head while enduring different obstacle courses for 15 minutes, after the 15th minute, the aiding housemates will serve as a human clock where they will stand in a clock and do some jumping jacks. This will serve as an additional time for Baninay and Cora. The housemate with the largest amount of water collected at the end will get the 4th lucky house.	Cora; 40.5 cm

1. Yassi gave up her spot due to prior commitments outside so Elisse took the 4th lucky star.

=== Dream House Challenge ===
On Day 198, Big Brother announced that the housemate will compete against each other to win a dream house worth almost ₱2 million. Each housemate was asked if they want to compete. All housemates except Edward, Kisses and McCoy^{1} accepted the challenge.

Challenge	Date given	Housemate	Aided by	Challenge description	Winner(s)
1	January 31 (Day 199)	Cora; Elisse; Jerome; Jinri; Maymay; Nikko; Nonong; Tanner		The housemates must unlock themselves from being handcuffed by getting the code inside a tiny house located in the middle of the activity area. The first four housemates to free themselves will proceed to the next challenge.	Cora; Jerome; Tanner; Maymay
2	February 2 (Day 201)	Cora	Jinri	The housemates must keep 7 balls from falling by holding a long pole. Last two housemates from keeping the balls from falling will move on to the next challenge.	Jerome; Tanner
2	February 2 (Day 201)	Jerome	Nikko; Yong	The housemates must keep 7 balls from falling by holding a long pole. Last two housemates from keeping the balls from falling will move on to the next challenge.	Jerome; Tanner
2	February 2 (Day 201)	Maymay	Edward; Elisse; Kisses; Nonong	The housemates must keep 7 balls from falling by holding a long pole. Last two housemates from keeping the balls from falling will move on to the next challenge.	Jerome; Tanner
2	February 2 (Day 201)	Tanner	none	The housemates must keep 7 balls from falling by holding a long pole. Last two housemates from keeping the balls from falling will move on to the next challenge.	Jerome; Tanner
3	February 3 (Day 202)	Jerome	Yong	The housemates must stack 11 miniature houses by reaching and getting them through a maze. First housemate to finish the challenge wins the Dream House challenge.	Tanner
3	February 3 (Day 202)	Tanner	Maymay	The housemates must stack 11 miniature houses by reaching and getting them through a maze. First housemate to finish the challenge wins the Dream House challenge.	Tanner

1. Only one from McCoy and Nikko can compete in the Dream House challenge because they're a 2-in-1 housemate.

=== Padalucks for Special Challenges ===
The public were given a chance to help their favorite housemates on their special challenges by using the hashtag #PADALUCK. The housemate who gets the most mentions in Twitter involving this hashtag will be given an advantage on their challenge.

Day	Housemate	Used for	Winner
Teens
August 27 (Day 45)	Aizan; Christian; Kisses	Ligtask Challenge	Kisses; 196,247 mentions
September 3 (Day 52)	Christian; Heaven; Kristine; Rita	Ligtask Challenge	Heaven; 154,364 mentions
September 10 (Day 59)	Christian; Fenech; Heaven; Kisses; Marco	Ligtask Challenge	Kisses; 378,259 mentions
October 1 (Day 80)	Christian; Kristine; Vivoree	Ligtask Challenge	Vivoree; 88,535 mentions
Adults
November 26 (Day 136)	Cora; Luis; Thuy; Wil	Ligtask Challenge	Luis; 50,546 mentions
December 8 (Day 148)	Ali; Cora; Jesi; Luis; Wil	Ligtask Challenge	Cora; 67,520 mentions
Dream Team
January 31 (Day 202)	Cora; Jerome; Maymay; Tanner	Dream House Challenge	Maymay; 616,926 mentions
February 6 (Day 208)	Cora & Tanner; Jinri & Nonong; Kisses & Yong; Maymay & Edward; McCoy & Elisse	Ligtas Pares Challenge	Maymay & Edward; 4,231,158 mentions

=== Dream Team Challenge ===
On Day 213, Big Brother announced that instead of Big 4, there might be Lucky 7 housemates who will continue the Big Night if they will pass 3 out of 5 Dream Team Challenges.

Task No.	Date given	Task title and description	Result
1	February 14 (Day 216)	Golden Balls; The housemates must able to transfer 7 golden balls which are increasing in size into the designated circles from the ceiling of the pool side to the other side on activity area by using improvise panungkit and place it on the ball's designated podium. It must be done within 72 hours to win the challenge. The housemates are divided into two groups.	Passed
2	February 17 (Day 219)	Champagne Glass Tower; The housemates must able to balance a table top with a glass tower on it using a rope that is holding by the housemate. They must do it in 7 hours without breaking the glass or the tower.	Failed
3	February 23–25 (Days 225-227)	PBB Live Drama; The housemates must participate in a 3 part live drama directed by Rory B. Quintos with no cuts and take twos airing from Thursday to Saturday. Each part corresponds to 1 dream team challenge.	Passed
4	February 23–25 (Days 225-227)	PBB Live Drama; The housemates must participate in a 3 part live drama directed by Rory B. Quintos with no cuts and take twos airing from Thursday to Saturday. Each part corresponds to 1 dream team challenge.	Passed
5	February 23–25 (Days 225-227)	PBB Live Drama; The housemates must participate in a 3 part live drama directed by Rory B. Quintos with no cuts and take twos airing from Thursday to Saturday. Each part corresponds to 1 dream team challenge.	Passed

== Nomination history ==
In every nomination, each housemate has to nominate two people with the first receiving two points and the second with one point. As the celebrity housemates entered the House a week before the official premiere of the show, nomination and eviction dates that happened in Vietnam will reflect the days a week from the actual air date. On Day 17, celebrity housemates went back to the Philippines, and the dates presented from this day onward will reflect dates when nominations and evictions were aired.

As a new format for evictions, Ligtask challenges will be the basis for evicting housemates. Only when the House is down to seven housemates for each batch will the public be given the chance to vote.

=== Celebrity housemates ===
	#1	Big Jump Challenge	2nd Lucky Star	3rd Lucky Star	4th Lucky Star	Nominations received
	#1	#2		#3	4th Lucky Star	Nominations received
Eviction Day and Date	Day 11 July 24	—	Day 23 August 5	Day 158 December 18	Day 181 January 10	Nominations received
Nomination Day and Date	Day 10; July 22	Day 22; August 4		—		Nominations received
Jinri	JK; Yassi	No nominations	Lucky Star (Exited Day 24)			4
McCoy Nikko	Jinri; Hideo	No nominations		Lucky Star (Exited Day 24)		3
Nonong	Chacha; JK	No nominations		Evicted (Day 23)	Lucky Star (Exited Day 158)	0
Elisse	Hideo; Chacha	No nominations		Evicted (Day 23)	Lucky Star (Day 181)	2
Yassi	Jinri; JK	No nominations		Evicted (Day 23)	Voluntary Exit (Day 181)	4
Hideo	Elisse; McCoy & Nikko	No nominations		Evicted (Day 23)		4
JK	McCoy & Nikko; Yassi	No nominations		Evicted (Day 23)		4
Chacha	Yassi; Hideo	Voluntary Exit (Day 11)				3
Notes	none	^{1}		^{2}	^{3}	
Up for eviction	Hideo; Jinri; JK; Yassi	Elisse; JK; Nonong; Yassi	Hideo; McCoy & Nikko	Elisse; Hideo; Nonong; Yassi	Elisse; Yassi	
Saved from eviction	Jinri; 1:26 minutes Yassi; 2:03 minutes JK; 2:40 minutes	McCoy & Nikko; 46.95%		Nonong; 5 out of 7 votes Regular Housemates' Choice	~~Yassi~~; 13:00 minutes Elisse; Recipient of Yassi's slot.	
Evicted	~~Hideo~~^{1} 15:09 minutes	Yassi; 20.85% Elisse; 17.13% JK; 7.59% Nonong; 5.53% Hideo; 1.95%		Hideo; 1 out of 7 votes Yassi; 1 out of 7 votes Elisse; 0 out of 7 votes	~~Elisse~~; 13:23 minutes	
Voluntary Exit	Chacha	none			Yassi	

Notes

1. Only one spot is given for the winner of the Big Jump challenge; the other spot is given to the housemates who had received the highest number of public votes. For the results of the Big Jump challenges, see Big Jump Lucky 2 Stars Challenge.
2. Elisse, Hideo, Nonong and Yassi were nominated to be the 3rd Lucky Star, which will be chosen by the regular housemates as a reward of winning 5 lucky tasks. JK was not able to take part due to his prior commitments.
3. Yassi won the 4th Lucky Star challenge. Due to her prior commitments, she will not be able to join the Dream team. She passed the 4th lucky star spot to Elisse.

=== Teen housemates ===
	#1	#2	#3	#4	#5	Face-to-Face Nominations	Ranking Nominations	Big Jump Challenge	2nd Lucky Sun	3rd Lucky Sun	4th Lucky Sun	Nominations received
	#1	#2	#3	#4	#5	#6	#7	#8	2nd Lucky Sun	#9	4th Lucky Sun	Nominations received
Eviction Day and Date	Day 45 August 27	Day 52 September 3	Day 59 September 10	Day 73 September 24	Day 80 October 1	Day 95 October 16	Day 101 October 22	Day 115 November 5	Day 123 November 13	Day 128 November 18	Day 183 January 12	Nominations received
Nomination Day and Date	Day 41; August 23	Day 46; August 28	Day 53; September 4	Day 63; September 14	Day 74; September 25	Day 90; October 11	Day 97; October 18	Day 108; October 29			–	Nominations received
Edward	Kisses; Vivoree	Fenech; Rita	Fenech; Kisses	Kisses; Christian	Christian; Yong	Christian; Vivoree	16 points	Lucky Sun (Exited Day 129)				18
Kisses	Christian; Heaven	Heaven; Rita	Heaven; Christian	Heaven; Christian	Kristine; Vivoree	Vivoree; Christian	14 points	No nominations	No nominations	Lucky Sun (Exited Day 129)		28
Maymay	Christian; Rita	Christian; Heaven	Christian; Heaven	Christian; Marco	Kristine; Christian	Christian; Marco	5 points	No nominations	No nominations	No nominations	Lucky Sun (Exited Day 129)	8
Yong	Aizan; Christian	Marco; Heaven	Christian; Marco	Christian; Heaven	Christian; Vivoree	Christian; Vivoree	11 points	No nominations	No nominations	No nominations	Lucky Sun (Day 183)	14
Christian	Aizan; Rita	Rita; Kristine	Heaven; Marco	Yong; Marco	Marco; Kristine	Marco; Vivoree	22 points	No nominations	Evicted (Day 115)			95
Vivoree	Christian; Aizan	Rita; Christian	Heaven; Christian	Christian; Edward	Christian; Maymay	Kisses; Christian	22 points	Evicted (Day 101)				32
Marco	Christian; Fenech	Christian; Kristine	Christian; Kristine	Christian; Kristine	Maymay; Christian	Christian; Kisses	Evicted (Day 95)					11
Kristine	Christian; Aizan	Rita; Christian	Christian; Vivoree	Christian; Kisses	Vivoree; Christian	Evicted (Day 80)						12
Heaven	Christian; Kisses	Kisses; Kristine	Christian; Kisses	Christian; Kisses	Voluntary Exit (Day 73)							18
Fenech	Aizan; Christian	Marco; Christian	Christian; Heaven	Evicted (Day 59)								5
Rita	Christian; Aizan	Kristine; Heaven	Evicted (Day 52)									10
Aizan	Christian; Edward	Evicted (Day 45)										9
Notes	none			^{1}	none		^{2}	none				
Up for eviction	Aizan; Christian; Kisses	Christian; Heaven; Kristine; Rita	Christian; Fenech; Heaven; Kisses; Marco	Christian; Heaven; Kisses	Christian; Kristine; Vivoree	Christian; Kisses; Marco; Vivoree	Christian; Edward; Kisses; Maymay; Vivoree; Yong	Christian; Kisses; Maymay; Yong	Kisses; Maymay; Yong	Maymay; Yong	Christian; Yong	
Padaluck Winner	Kisses	Heaven	Kisses	none	Vivoree	Not implemented						
Ligtask Winner(s)	Not implemented					Christian	Christian; Edward; Maymay	Not implemented				
Saved from eviction	Kisses; 2:29 minutes Christian; 2:43 minutes	Christian; 18 cubes Kristine; 18 cubes Heaven; 14 cubes	Christian; 5:04 minutes Marco; 9:15 minutes Heaven; 11:52 minutes Kisses; 12:43 minutes	Christian; Kisses	Vivoree; 4:22 minutes Christian; 4:40 minutes	Kisses; 75.03% Vivoree; 16.99%	Kisses; 43.02% Yong; 39.56%	Kisses; 45.63% Maymay; 26.53% Yong; 24.42%	Kisses; 48.53%	Maymay; 54.57%	Yong; 10 points	
Evicted	Aizan; 3:04 minutes	Rita; 13 cubes	Fenech; 13:07 minutes	No Eviction	Kristine; 4:50 minutes	Marco; 7.98%	Vivoree; 17.42%	Christian; 3.42%	No Eviction	Yong; 45.43%	Christian; 9 points	
Voluntary Exit	none			Heaven	none							

Notes

1. The housemates didn't pass the weekly task Paliga ni Kuya. Because of this, the eviction will still occur. see Weekly tasks.
2. All housemates were up for eviction. However, Big Brother implemented a Ligtask Challenge so the three will be saved from eviction while the other three will be facing the public vote. Edward topped the Ligtask challenge by having the least balls.

=== Adult housemates ===
	#1	Double Trouble	Positive Nominations	Ranking Nominations	Big Jump Challenge	2nd Lucky House	3rd Lucky House	4th Lucky House	Nominations received
	#1	#2	#3	#4	#5	#6	#7	4th Lucky House	Nominations received
Eviction Day and Date	Day 136 November 26	Day 148 December 8	Day 158 December 18	—	Day 173 January 2	Day 174 January 3	Day 177 January 6	Day 184 January 13	Nominations received
Nomination Day and Date	Day 130; November 20	Day 144; December 4	Day 157; December 17	Day 166; December 26	Day 172; January 1	Day 173; January 2	—		Nominations received
Tanner	Luis; Wil	No nominations	Luis; Jerome	No nominations	No nominations	Lucky House (Day 173)			5
Aura	Cora; Tanner	No nominations	Baninay; Cora	No nominations	No nominations	No nominations	Lucky House (Day 174)		4
Jerome	Wil; Cora	No nominations	Cora; Aura	No nominations	No nominations	Evicted (Day 173)		Lucky House (Day 177)	4
Cora	Aura; Jerome	No nominations	Jerome; Tanner	No nominations	No nominations	Evicted (Day 173)		Lucky House (Day 184)	17
Baninay	Ali; Luis	No nominations	Cora; Tanner	No nominations	Evicted (Day 172)				6
Wil	Baninay; Ali	No nominations	Tanner; Aura	No nominations	Evicted (Day 172)				9
Luis	Cora; Baninay	No nominations	Cora; Baninay	Evicted (Day 158)					7
Ali	Luis; Cora	No nominations	Evicted (Day 148)						4
Jesi	Wil; Cora	No nominations	Evicted (Day 148)						0
Thuy	Wil; Cora	Evicted (Day 136)							0
Notes	^{1}	none		^{2} ^{3}	none				
Up for Eviction	Cora; Luis; Thuy; Wil	Ali; Cora; Jesi; Luis; Wil	Aura; Luis; Wil	Baninay; Cora; Jerome; Wil	Aura; Baninay; Cora; Jerome; Wil	Aura; Cora; Jerome	Baninay; Cora; Jerome; Wil	Baninay; Cora	
Padaluck Winner	Luis	Cora	Not implemented						
Ligtask Winner	Not implemented		Aura	Not implemented					
Saved from eviction	Luis; 4:39 minutes Wil; 4:41 minutes Cora; 6:22 minutes	Cora; 4:44 minutes Wil; 9:23 minutes Luis; 13:22 minutes	Wil; 52.43%	Baninay; Cora; Jerome; Wil	Aura; 45.84% Cora; 21.87% Jerome; 18.46%	Aura; 51.16%	Jerome; 3 out of 7 votes Teen Housemates' Choice	Cora; 40.5 cm	
Evicted	Thuy; 6:24 minutes	Ali; 14:28 minutes Jesi; 15:25 minutes	Luis; 47.57%	No; Eviction	Wil; 7.95% Baninay; 6.36%	Cora; 26.79% Jerome; 22.05%	Cora; 2 out of 7 votes Wil; 2 out of 7 votes Baninay; 0 out of 7 votes	Baninay; 39.5 cm	

Notes

1. Tanner, Wil, Ali, and Cora were punished for violating some house rules. They were asked to pick a ball inside a tambiolo. Each ball corresponds to either 1 point or 2 points, and whatever points they get will be added to their nomination points. Tanner and Ali got 1 additional point, while Wil and Cora got 2 more points.
2. Aura and Tanner are not allowed to participate on their 7th Lucky Task because they will be competing for the Big Jump Challenge
3. Because the housemates succeeded in their 7th Lucky Task, Baninay, Cora, Jerome, and Wil will no longer face the upcoming eviction.

=== Dream Team ===
	#1	#2	Ligtas Pares Challenges	Face-to-Face Nominations	Back-to-Back Nomination and Eviction Positive Nominations	Big Night		Nominations received
	#1	#2	#3	#4	#5	#6		Nominations received
Eviction Day and Date	Day 199 January 28	Day 206 February 4	Day 213 February 11	Day 220 February 18	Day 228 February 25	Day 234 March 4	Day 235 March 5	Nominations received
Nomination Day and Date	Day 193; January 22	Day 200; January 29	Days 208–212; February 6–10	Day 214; February 12	Day 228; February 26	—		Nominations received
Maymay	Aura; Tanner	Cora; Jerome	No nominations	Cora; McCoy & Nikko	Edward; Tanner	Advanced	Winner	1 (–4)
Kisses	Jerome; Tanner	McCoy & Nikko; Jerome	No nominations	Tanner; Cora	Maymay; Tanner	Advanced	Runner-up	0 (+1; –1)
Yong	Jinri; Aura	McCoy & Nikko; Nonong	No nominations	Tanner; Cora	Maymay; Edward	Advanced	3rd Place	2 (+1, –1)
Edward	Aura; Cora	Cora; Jerome	No nominations	Cora; Jinri	Tanner; Maymay	Advanced	4th place	1 (–2)
Tanner	Jinri; Yong	McCoy & Nikko; Jinri	No nominations	Jinri; McCoy & Nikko	Cora; McCoy & Nikko	5th place	Exited (Day 234)	24 (–5)
McCoy Nikko	Tanner; Aura	Jerome; Tanner	No nominations	Jinri; Tanner	Maymay; Kisses	6th place	Exited (Day 234)	11 (–2)
Cora	Jerome; Aura	Tanner; Yong	No nominations	Elisse; McCoy & Nikko	Tanner; Yong	7th place	Exited (Day 234)	17 (–1)
Elisse	Tanner; Aura	Tanner; Cora	No nominations	Cora; Tanner	Tanner; McCoy & Nikko	Evicted (Day 228)		2
Jinri	Tanner; Cora	Tanner; Nonong	No nominations	Tanner; McCoy & Nikko	Evicted (Day 220)			18 (+1)
Nonong	Jinri; Edward	Jinri; Tanner	No nominations	Evicted (Day 213)				3 (+1)
Jerome	Jinri; Maymay	Cora; McCoy & Nikko	Evicted (Day 206)					9
Aura	Jinri; Nonong	Evicted (Day 199)						8
Up for eviction	Aura; Jerome; Jinri; Tanner	Cora; Jerome; McCoy & Nikko; Tanner	Open Nominations	Cora; Jinri; McCoy & Nikko; Tanner	Cora; Elisse; Kisses; Yong	Open; Voting		
Ligtask Winner	Tanner	Tanner	Cora; Edward; Elisse; Maymay; McCoy & Nikko; Tanner	Not implemented				
Saved from eviction	Jinri; 50.00% Jerome; 27.82%	McCoy & Nikko; 53.10% Cora; 31.06%	Kisses; 63.37% Yong; 21.55% Jinri; 10.24%	McCoy & Nikko; 36.06% Tanner; 28.85% Cora; 24.02%	Yong; 41.10% Kisses; 26.71% Cora; 19.46%	Kisses; 34.79% Maymay; 34.16% Yong; 8.54% Edward; 6.27%	Maymay; 42.71%	
Evicted	Aura; 22.19%	Jerome; 15.84%	Nonong; 4.85%	Jinri; 11.08%	Elisse; 12.73%	Tanner; 5.93% McCoy & Nikko; 5.22% Cora; 5.10%	Kisses; 31.27% Yong; 21.52% Edward; 4.49%	

Legend

Housemate received immunity after winning/finishing a task
Housemate received automatic nomination

== The Big Night ==
The Big Night for this season was held at the Alonte Sports Arena in Biñan, Laguna from March 4–5, 2017, (Days 234 & 235).

On Day 234, before going to the venue, the housemates were given a surprise interview by the hosts of It's Showtime. They were transported into a truck that drove them into the venue, blindfolded. An opening production number was spearheaded by most of the Lucky Ex-housemates, together with Alex Gonzaga (the show's longest-staying houseguest), Tommy Esguerra (737 2nd Big Placer) and Big Winners Daniel Matsunaga and Miho Nishida, which were held inside the arena and a stage set outside. After which, Big Brother gave his final message to his Lucky 7, who were situated in a green room depicting an augmented reality of a castle hall in an interdimensional plane (the first in the season to do so) and the traditional üBER-Acting skit returns and performed by the contestants of Your Face Sounds Familiar Kids, Niño Muhlach, together with mainstay hosts Toni Gonzaga and Robi Domingo, highlighting some of the best moments of the show's longest edition.

Just like the 737 season, the seven-day open voting was closed and the first set of announcements were made. Cora Waddell, Nikko Natividad & McCoy de Leon, and Tanner Mata were named the 7th to 5th Lucky Big Placers respectively. The voting tally ended up very narrow with the top-gainer edging the closest contender less than one percent (0.62% to be exact). It was reset to zero after they announced the Dream Team Big 4 and voting will open tomorrow night.

The table shows the final tally of votes prior to the first set of announcements and note that the codes per housemate reflect that they are a Lucky Housemate (L, U, C, K, Y, H, M)

Dream Team Lucky 7	Votes	Result
Dream Team Lucky 7	Big Night	Result
Nikko & McCoy	5.22%	6th place
Edward	6.27%	Advanced
Kisses	34.79%	Advanced
Maymay	34.16%	Advanced
Yong	8.54%	Advanced
Tanner	5.93%	5th place
Cora	5.10%	7th place
Total votes	100%	—N/a

On Day 235, the show began with a production number with Gonzaga. Like yesterday, the Lucky Big 4 were then transported on separated vehicles to the venue. After this, the voting lines were re-opened and voting for the Big Winner was done in a span of 30 minutes (with the arrangement of the housemates changed to L, U, C, and K). While this is ongoing, the Lucky Big 4 were tasked to ask questions to their respective housemates, highlighting some of the important moments in the season. After that, the voting lines were then closed and two events happened after: an interview with the 5th-7th Lucky Big Placers and a production number from 737 alumnus Zeus Collins, 737 4th Big Placer Dawn Chang, Lucky 7 celebrity housemate Yassi Pressman and the show's first Teen Big Winner Kim Chiu.

Chiu and Garcia then accompanied Gonzaga in announcing the 4th and 3rd Big Placers respectively, with Edward Barber and Yong Muhajil garnering those placings. After which, the final 2 were named and the announcements for their fate were made with the director of the show and head of TV production Lauren Dyogi, and head of broadcast Cory Vidanes. Kisses Delavin was named the 2nd Big Placer while Maymay Entrata was announced the 14th Big Winner of the show.

Mariel Rodriguez was noticeably absent in the show due to her maternity leave. The table below shows the final breakdown of the votes.

Dream Team Big 4	Votes	Result
Dream Team Big 4	Big Night	Result
Edward	4.49%	4th place
Kisses	31.27%	Runner-up
Maymay	42.71%	Big Winner
Yong	21.52%	3rd Place
Total votes	100%	—N/a

Preceded by 737	Pinoy Big Brother: Lucky Season 7 (July 11, 2016–March 5, 2017)	Succeeded by Otso
