= Rhoel Gallardo =

Catholic priest (1965–2000)

Servant of God Rhoel D. Gallardo CMF
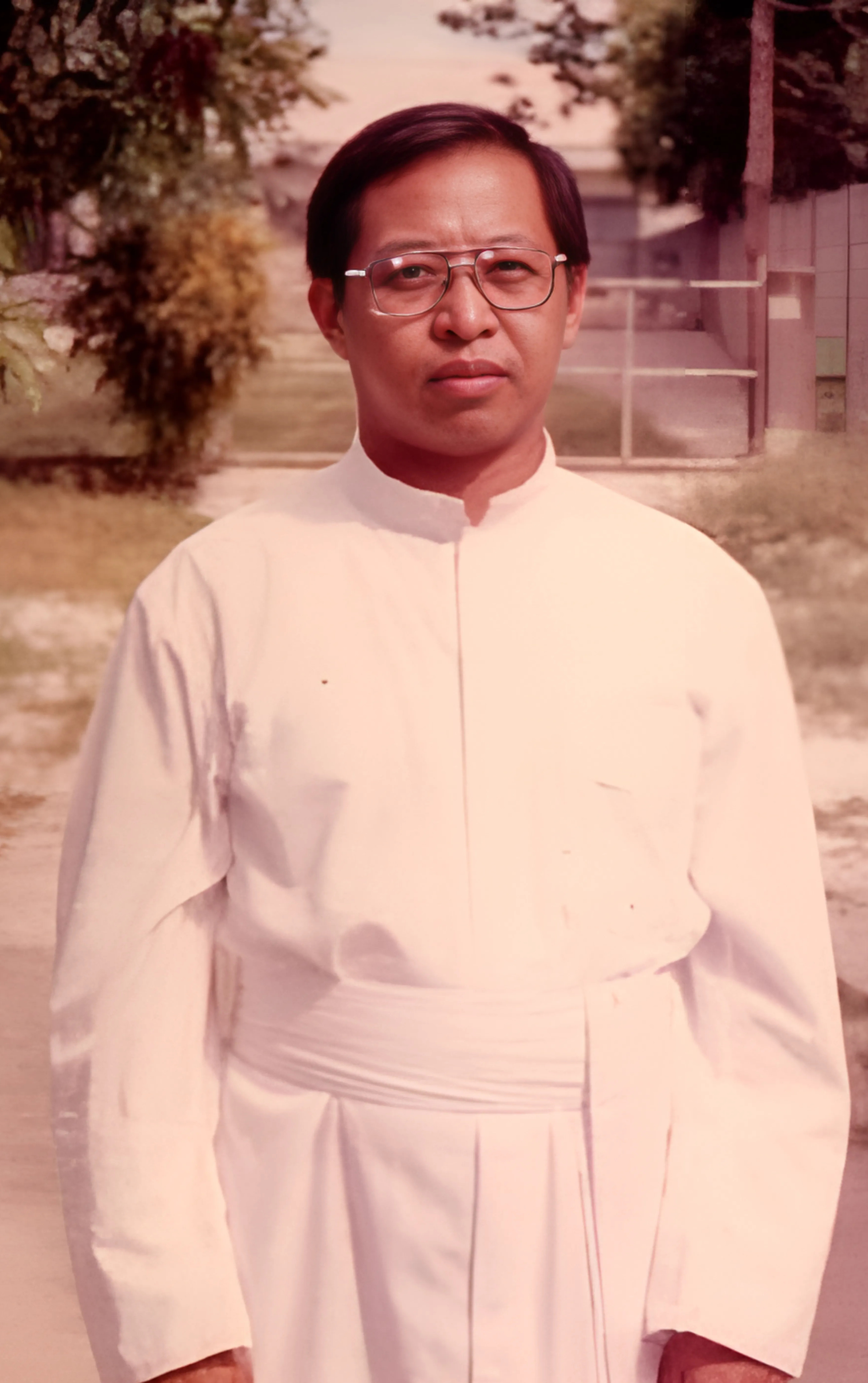
- Born: November 29, 1965; Olongapo, Zambales, Philippines
- Died: May 3, 2000 (aged 34); Sumisip, Basilan, Philippines

Rhoel Dayap Gallardo CMF (November 29, 1965 – May 3, 2000) was a Filipino Catholic priest. Known as the "Little Claret" owing to his small size and saintly manner, he joined the Claretians in 1988 and was ordained to the priesthood in 1994. He was eventually martyred in Basilan in 2000 by the Abu Sayyaf group. His cause for beatification was opened in 2021.

== Early life ==
Gallardo was born on November 29, 1965, in Olongapo, Zambales, Philippines, to Dominador Gallardo and Raquel Dayap. He was the second child among five siblings.

== Ministry ==
In 1988, Gallardo joined the Claretian Order, and took his first vows on May 1, 1989, in Isabela, Basilan. After completing his first pastoral year in the town of Maluso in the same province, he recounted his experience in his application for his perpetual profession:

My pastoral immersion in Basilan last year made me experience concretely our witnessing and evangelizing life and mission to the poor (as well as) our Community’s presence in the dialogue of life and faith with our Muslim brothers and sisters. These experiences, as a whole, have become a real challenge to me to be a committed missionary and active witness to God’s liberating love for humanity… conscious that our life and mission demand a total giving of ourselves for the greater glory of God and the salvation of humankind.

After professing his perpetual vows in 1993, Gallardo was ordained to the priesthood on December 6, 1994, at the Immaculate Heart of Mary Parish Church in Quezon City.

Gallardo's last assignment was at the parish church of Saint Vincent Ferrer in Barangay Tumahubong, Sumisip, Basilan. He volunteered to be assigned to that parish after its priest fell ill in June 1999. He also served as the director of the Claret School of Tumahubong.

== Kidnapping and death ==
On March 20, 2000, Abu Sayyaf militants stormed the Claret School of Tumahubong. The group burned the school, and abducted people in the area including teachers and students. Gallardo who resides in a mission house inside the complex was among those who were captured. The captives were kept in Punoh Mahadji and on May 3, 2000, they were brought out of the site; reportedly being planned to be transferred to Sulu. At one point, the male and female captives were separated from each other. Gallardo along with three teachers and five students were found dead. His body was found to be riddled with three bullet wounds caused by close-range shots, and had his nails removed.

Gallardo's remains were brought to Zambales on May 7. He was then buried on May 10 at Himlayang Pilipino in Quezon City.

== Cause for beatification ==
Five years after Gallardo's martyrdom, a group of former Claretian seminarians pushed for his beatification.

On May 3, 2021, Bishop Leo Dalmao of the Territorial Prelature of Isabela opened the diocesan process for the cause of Gallardo's beatification per viam Martyrii ("by way of martyrdom"). According to Elias Ayuban, then-provincial superior of Filipino Claretians, Gallardo was asked to denounce his Catholic faith but refused. Among his noted acts was during his kidnapping; he is testified to have protected his co-captives and prevented the rape of women, and gave spiritual support such as praying the rosary together with the other captives. He is also noted to have fostered Christian-Muslim relations in Basilan.

On November 20, 2021, the Claretian Province in the Philippines was renamed in honor of Gallardo.

== In popular culture ==
Gallardo was portrayed by McCoy de Leon in the 2025 film In Thy Name. The following year, Zaijian Jaranilla played him in Seeds of Peace.

== See also ==
- List of Filipinos venerated in the Catholic Church
