= In Thy Name =

2025 drama film by Caesar Soriano and Rommel G. Ruiz

- Theatrical release poster
- Directed by: Caesar Soriano; Rommel G. Ruiz
- Screenplay by: Robert Pagdagdagan-Raz; Rommel G. Ruiz; Joji Magbintang
- Produced by: Rosalyn Sinchongco
- Starring: McCoy de Leon; JC de Vera; Mon Confiado; Jerome Ponce; Aya Fernandez; Yves Flores
- Cinematography: Rommel Galapia Ruiz
- Edited by: Aymer Alquinto
- Music by: Paulo Almaden
- Production company: GreatCzar Media Production
- Distributed by: Viva Films
- Release date: March 5, 2025
- Running time: 96 minutes
- Country: Philippines
- Language: Filipino

In Thy Name is a 2025 Philippine drama film directed by Caesar Soriano and Rommel Galapia Ruiz and written by Ruiz, Robert Pagdagdagan-Raz, and Joji Magbintang. It stars McCoy de Leon, JC de Vera, Mon Confiado, Jerome Ponce, Aya Fernandez and Yves Flores. The film is about Fr. Rhoel Gallardo, a priest who was abducted by Abu Sayyaf militants.

== Synopsis ==
The film follows Fr. Rhoel Gallardo, a Claretian missionary who was martyred in Basilan after Abu Sayyaf militants stormed the Claretian School in the area.

== Cast ==
- McCoy de Leon as Fr. Rhoel Gallardo
- JC de Vera as Khadaffy Janjalani
- Mon Confiado as Abu Sabaya
- Jerome Ponce as Herbert Dilag
- Aya Fernandez as Theresa
- Yves Flores as Andrew Bacala
- Soliman Cruz as Rey Rubio
- Martin Escudero Isnilon
- Alex Medina as Rosebert
- Ynez Veneracion
- Elora Espanio as Lydda
- Kat Galang as Anabelle
- JM Soriano as Abu Fandal
- Kenken Nuyad as Reylios
- Cassandra Lavarias as Emylin
- John Estrada as BGen. Narciso Abaya
- Pen Medina as MNLF Commander Talib Congo
- Richard Quan as Gallardo 1
- Ana Abad Santos as Gallardo 2
- Arron Villaflor as Captain Sabban
- Gold Aceron as Gallardo 3
- Lowell Conales as Nelson
- Jal Galang as Abu Amira
- Polo Laurel as Mario Rapanut
- Chris Leonardo as Jaime Villanueva
- Lei Rosario as Dante
- Dylan Talon as Abu Hasser
- Marx Topacio as Isagani Criste
- Gino Illustre as Col.Aromin
- Jun Nayra as Maj.Caldeo

== Production ==
In a press conference on February 6, the director and the cast disclosed that McCoy de Leon cried while shooting the torture scene where Mon Confiado spat phlegm on him in the face.

McCoy said (translated into English);

“The Unforgettable scene for me is the torture scene where Kuya Mon spits phlegm on me. I cried, and my tears are real. That's the cry of McCoy, not Fr. Rhoel. I lie down so they can't see me crying, but it was satisfying that I sacrificed something for that thing; I made those scenes.

Mon Confiado added that he really had a cough and phlegm at the time they were shooting the scene. He said (translated into English);

“If I spit just saliva, it is not visible because it was thin. I collected my phlegm, and I used it for the scene. It was a long take, take one, and I spit twice; it has a close-up, you can see it in the movie.

== Release ==
The film was released on March 5, 2025, Ash Wednesday, under Viva Films.
