= Big Brother Vietnam =

Vietnamese adaptation of "Big Brother" TV series

- Presented by: Huy Khánh
- No. of days: 64
- No. of contestants: 13
- Winner: Hoàng Sơn Việt
- Runner-up: Huỳnh Ngọc Trí

Release
- Original network: VTV6
- Original release: 12 November 2013 – 14 January 2014

Người giấu mặt (lit. 'The Anonymous') is a Vietnamese version of the Big Brother reality television show based on the Dutch television series of the Big Brother. It revolves around a cohort of individuals termed Housemates, cohabiting within the confines of the 'Big Brother' residence, subject to continuous observation and devoid of external communication for an extended duration of five months.

Following nearly 11 years of contemplation, VTV6, in collaboration with production company BHD, embarked on the realization of the Vietnamese adaptation of Big Brother, titled Người giấu mặt. The first episode's live broadcast aired on VTV6 at 19:55 on Tuesday, November 12. Promising a grand prize of 2 billion VND for the victor, the program made its debut on VTV6's primetime lineup on November 12, 2013, culminating on January 14, 2014.

According to BHD representatives, the production set new benchmarks in both expenditure and technical complexity, surpassing even the most renowned global reality TV productions previously undertaken by BHD. The production boasted a team of 150 personnel, including 12 international experts, and employed over 40 cameras, ranging from automated robotic units to handheld devices.

There are no plans for future seasons due to the government's revised television policies.

In 2016, the 7th season of Pinoy Big Brother used this house and was redecorated especially for that season.

== Housemates ==
Housemate	Age	Occupation	Entered	Exited	Status
Hoàng Sơn Việt	27	Merchant	Day 1	Day 64	Winner
Huỳnh Ngọc Trí	22	Dancer	Day 1	Day 64	Runner-up
Nguyễn Quỳnh Trang	28	Model	Day 1	Day 64	3rd Place
Nguyễn Minh Long	25	Tattoo artist, Dancer	Day 1	Day 64	4th Place
Phùng Thị Thu Thảo	22	Miss Teen	Day 1	Day 57	Evicted
Trish Lương	25	Bartender	Day 1	Day 50	Evicted
Nguyễn Thị Hồng Hạnh	24	Businesswoman	Day 22	Day 50	Evicted
Phan Chí Bửu	28	Personal trainer	Day 1	Day 43	Evicted
Mai Bảo Ngọc	21	Voice actress	Day 1	Day 36	Evicted
Nguyễn Hiền	30	Freelance decorator	Day 1	Day 29	Evicted
Trần Hoài Sơn	25	Actor	Day 1	Day 22	Evicted
Hoàng Thị Ánh Nguyệt (Moon)	26	Airport Security	Day 1	Day 22	Walked
Nguyễn Thị Hà Thủy	28	Chef	Day 1	Day 15	Evicted

== Nominations table ==
	Week 2	Week 3	Week 4	Week 5	Week 6	Week 7	Week 8	Week 9	
Việt	Thủy, Nguyệt	Trish, Sơn	Trish, Ngọc	Ngọc, Hạnh	Trish, Trang	Hạnh, Trang, Trish	Trang, Thảo	Winner (Day 64)	
Trí	Nguyệt, Trang	Nguyệt, Trang	Hiền, Trang	Trang, Hạnh	Bửu, Hạnh	Hạnh, Trish, Việt	Trang, Việt	Runner-Up (Day 64)	
Trang	Trish, Thủy	Trish, Bửu	Trish, Hiền	Bửu, Trish	Bửu, Hạnh	Trish, Việt, Hạnh	Việt, Long	Third place (Day 64)	
Long	Nguyệt, Thủy	Trish, Sơn	Hiền, Trí	Ngọc, Trang	Trish, Trang	Thảo, Trish, Việt	Trang, Thảo	Fourth place (Day 64)	
Thảo	Sơn, Thủy	Bửu, Hiền	Hiền, Ngọc	Ngọc, Bửu	Bửu, Hạnh	Trish, Hạnh, Trí	Long, Trang	Evicted (Day 57)	
Trish	Trang, Hiền	Trang, Việt	Bửu, Việt	Bửu, Ngọc	Bửu, Hạnh	Trang, Hạnh, Long	Evicted (Day 50)		
Hạnh	Not in House		Exempt	Ngọc, Bửu	Trang, Trish	Trí, Việt, Trish	Evicted (Day 50)		
Bửu	Trang, Thủy	Trang, Sơn	Trang, Trish	Trish, Hạnh	Trish, Trang	Evicted (Day 43)			
Ngọc	Bửu, Trang	Trang, Sơn	Hiền, Trí	Trang, Hạnh	Evicted (Day 36)				
Hiền	Trish, Thủy	Trish, Sơn	Trish, Thảo	Evicted (Day 29)					
Sơn	Trang, Việt	Bửu, Ngọc	Evicted (Day 22)						
Nguyệt	Trang, Ngọc	Trang, Ngọc	Walked (Day 22)						
Thủy	Hiền, Trang	Evicted (Day 15)							
Notes	none			1, 2	none	3	none		
Nominated for eviction	Thủy, Trang	Sơn, Trang	Hiền, Trish	Hạnh, Ngọc, Trang	Bửu, Hạnh, Trang, Trish	Hạnh, Trish, Việt	Long, Thảo, Trang, Việt	Long, Trang, Trí, Việt	
Walked	none	Nguyệt	none						
Evicted	Thủy; 37.72% to save	Sơn; 40.66% to save	Hiền; 26.25% to save	Ngọc; 28.96% to save	Bửu; 10.59% to save	Hạnh; 12.46% to save	Thảo; Fewest votes to save	Long; 11% to win	Trang; 20% to win
Evicted	Thủy; 37.72% to save	Sơn; 40.66% to save	Hiền; 26.25% to save	Ngọc; 28.96% to save	Bửu; 10.59% to save	Trish; 37.07% to save	Thảo; Fewest votes to save	Trí; 28% to win	
Survived	Trang; 62.28%	Trang; 59.34%	Trish; 73.75%	Trang; 40.22% Hạnh; 30.82%	Trish; 41.50% Trang; 35.22% Hạnh; 13.15%	Việt; 50.46%	Long; Trang; Việt; Most votes	Việt; 38.87% to win	

- ^Note 1: Thảo and Trang received an extra vote due to rule breaking.
- ^Note 2: Bửu won a challenge in the weekly task and had one positive point to add to his total.
- ^Note 3: This week, housemates nominated 3 other housemates instead of 2.

== Nominations total received ==
	Week 2	Week 3	Week 4	Week 5	Week 6	Week 7	Week 8	Week 9	Total
Việt	1	1	1	0	0	4	2	Winner	9
Trí	0	0	2	0	0	2	0	Runner-Up	4
Trang	7	5	2	4	4	2	4	3rd Place	28
Long	0	0	0	0	0	1	2	4th Place	3
Thảo	0	0	1	1	0	1	2	Evicted	5
Trish	2	4	4	2	4	6	Evicted		22
Hạnh	Not in House		–	4	4	5	Evicted		13
Bửu	1	2	1	4	4	Evicted			12
Ngọc	1	2	2	5	Evicted				10
Hiền	2	1	5	Evicted					8
Sơn	1	5	Evicted						6
Nguyệt	3	1	Walked						4
Thủy	6	Evicted							6
