= Claretians =

Community of Catholic priests

Congregation of Missionary Sons of the Immaculate Heart of the Blessed Virgin Mary
- Congregatio Missionariorum Filiorum Immaculati Cordis Beatae Mariae Virginis
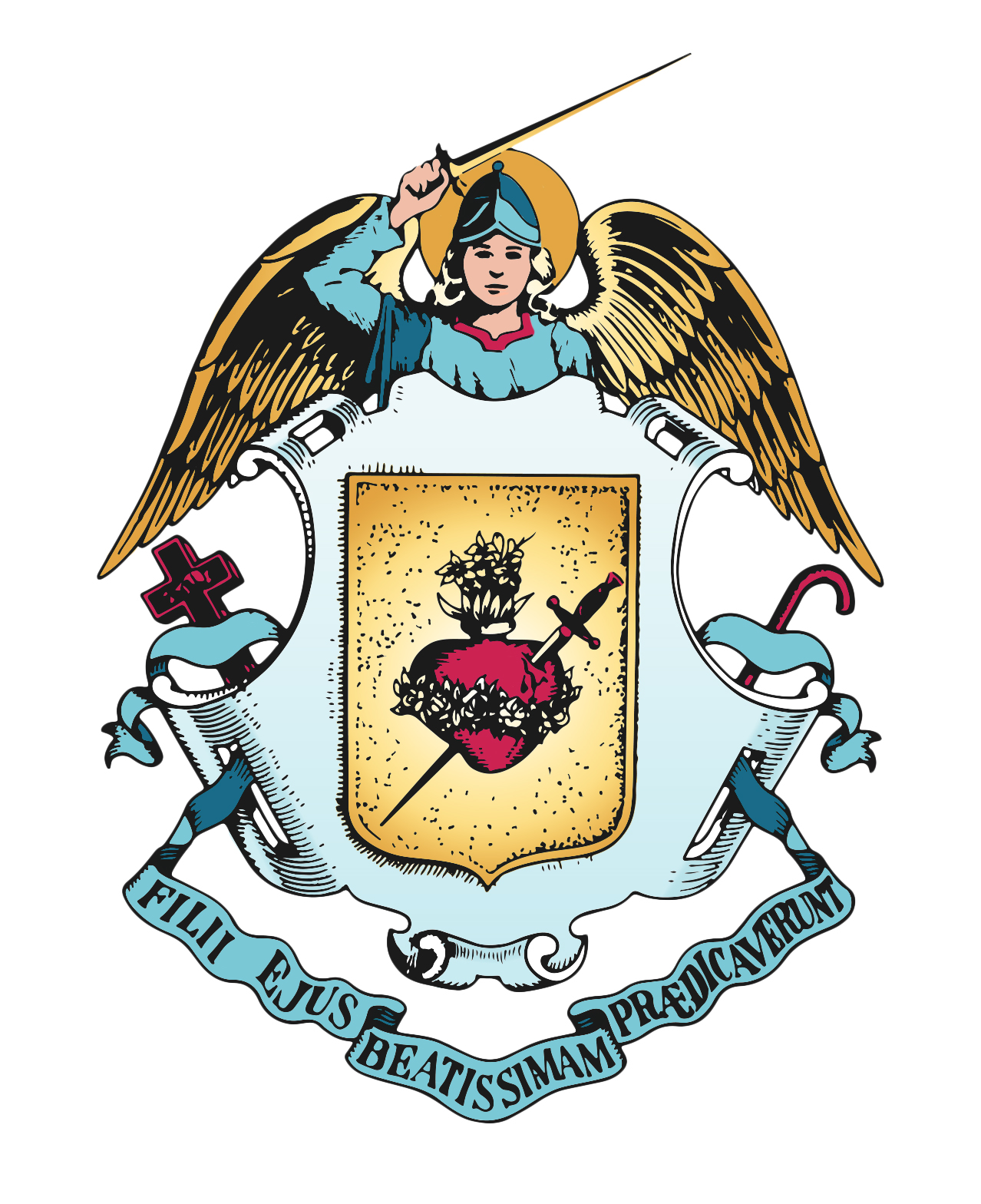
- Coat of arms of the Claretians
- Abbreviation: CMF
- Nickname: Claretians
- Formation: 16 July 1849 (177 years ago)
- Founders: Antonio María Claret, C.M.F. Esteban Sala, CMF; José Xifré, CMF
- Founded at: Barcelona, Catalonia, Spain
- Type: Clerical religious congregation of pontifical right for men
- Headquarters: Via del Sacro Cuore di Maria 5, Rome, Italy
- Members: 3,034 members (2,239 priests) (2020)
- motto: Latin: Filii Ejus Beatissimam Predicaverunt; English: Her sons proclaimed her most blessed.
- Superior General: Fr. Mathew Vattamattam, CMF
- Main organ: Commentarium pro Religiosis et Missionariis
- Parent organization: Catholic Church
- Website: claret.org

The Claretians, officially named the Congregation of Missionary Sons of the Immaculate Heart of the Blessed Virgin Mary (Latin: Congregatio Missionariorum Filiorum Immaculati Cordis Beatae Mariae Virginis; abbreviated CMF), is a Catholic clerical religious congregation of Pontifical Right for men headquartered in Rome. It was founded on July 16, 1849, by Fr. Antonio María Claret y Clará, C.M.F. They are active as missionaries worldwide, in 70 countries on five continents. The number of Claretian priests and brothers is at more than 3,000. The Congregation has a particular devotion to the Immaculate Heart of Mary and members have published extensively in Mariology.

== History ==
The Congregation of the "Missionary Sons of the Immaculate Heart of Mary" was founded by Anthony Mary Claret on July 16, 1849, at the seminary in Vic, in the province of Barcelona, Catalonia, Spain.

Claret had been thinking for a long time about preparing priests to proclaim the Gospel and bring together a group of priests who shared his vision to accomplish the work he could not do alone. Through his missionary work in Catalonia and the Canary Islands he was convinced that people needed to be evangelized and there were not enough priests who were sufficiently prepared or zealous enough for this mission. Only 20 days after the CMF's founding, Claret received news of his appointment as Archbishop of Cuba, which he accepted despite his reluctance. The Congregation was left under the guidance of one of the co-founders, Esteban Sala, who died in 1858. Another co-founder, José Xifré, took over the directorship. Under his leadership the Congregation established its first mission in Equatorial Guinea.

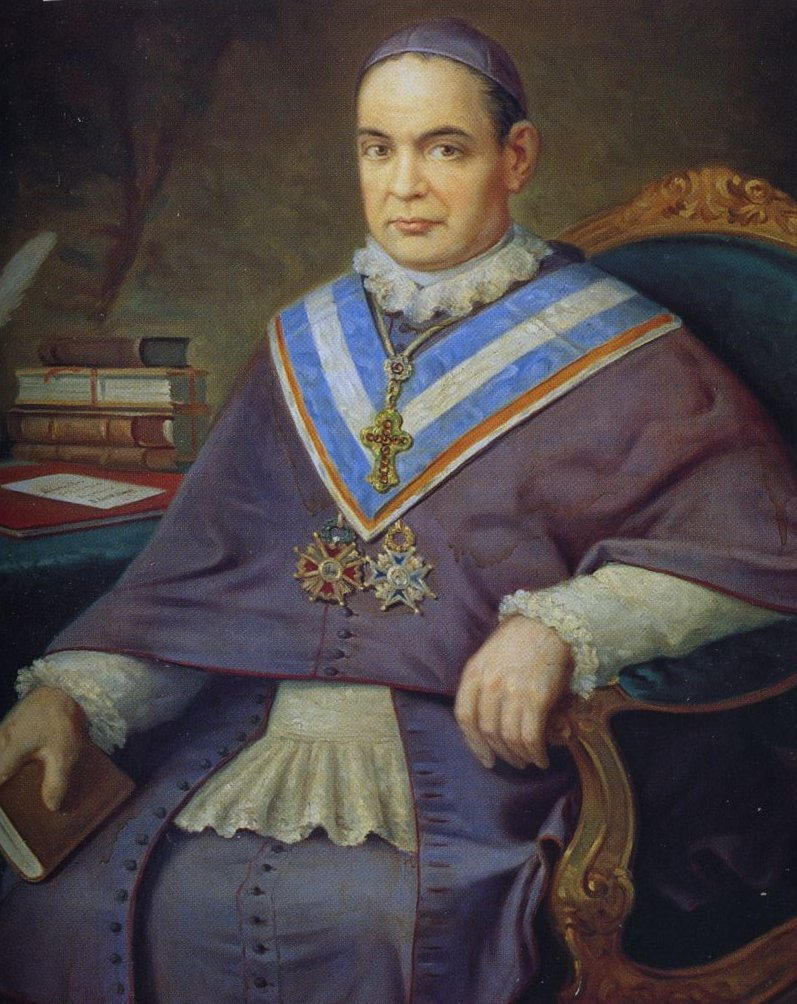
San Antonio María Claret

With the coming of the Revolution of 1868, the Congregation was suppressed by the state and all the Missionaries had to seek refuge in France. Archbishop Claret also went into exile there. He played a major role editing the Constitutions, which the Holy See approved on February 11, 1870, only a few months before his death. At this time the institute had its first martyr, Francisco Crusats. Archbishop Claret, the founder, had the great satisfaction of seeing new foundations established throughout Spain, as well as in Africa (Argel), and in Latin America in México, Chile, and also, in the Philippines.

The missionaries often faced extreme hardships. Of the eleven that made up the first expedition to Cuba all but two died a few days after arriving on the island. During the Mexican Revolution, Andres Sola died a martyr; and in the Spanish Civil War, 270 missionary priests, brothers and students were killed. Among them are the "51 Blessed Martyrs of Barbastro", members of the Claretian community at the seminary in Barbastro, Spain who were executed in August 1936, including nine priests and five brothers. Two were spared as they were foreigners from Argentina. These 51 Claretian Martyrs were the companions of the 18 Benedictine Martyrs of El Pueyo, Barbastro. They were beatified by Pope John Paul II on 25 October 1992, and are commemorated on 25 October. The relics of all fifty-one martyrs are kept at their original seminary in Barbastro, which now functions as a museum and chapel.

From 1949 to 1952 the missionaries were banned in China. In 1973 through the instrumentality of Fr Christian Ihedoro, the Congregation came to Nigeria. In May 2000, Rhoel Gallardo was murdered by Islamic separatists in Mindanao.

== Publications ==
The Congregation has an academic publishing company, Editiones Institutum Iuridicum Claretianum (Ediurcla), based in Rome. Their journal Commentarium pro Religiosis has been appearing since 1920, from 1935 as Commentarium pro Religiosis et Missionariis (abbreviated CRM, ISSN 1124-0172).

A number of Claretian publishing houses are united in the Claret Publishing Group, including Misioneros Claretianos (Sevilla), Editorial Claretiana (Buenos Aires), Misioneros Claretianos (Madrid), Claretian Communications Foundation Inc. (Quezon City, formerly Claretian Publications, established 1981) Claretian Publications (Bangalore) and Congregation Des Missionaires Claretians (Yaoundé). The Claretians of the United States and Canada also operate Claretian Publications and the U.S. Catholic magazine.

== By location ==
=== ECLA - Europeans Claretians ===
==== United Kingdom ====
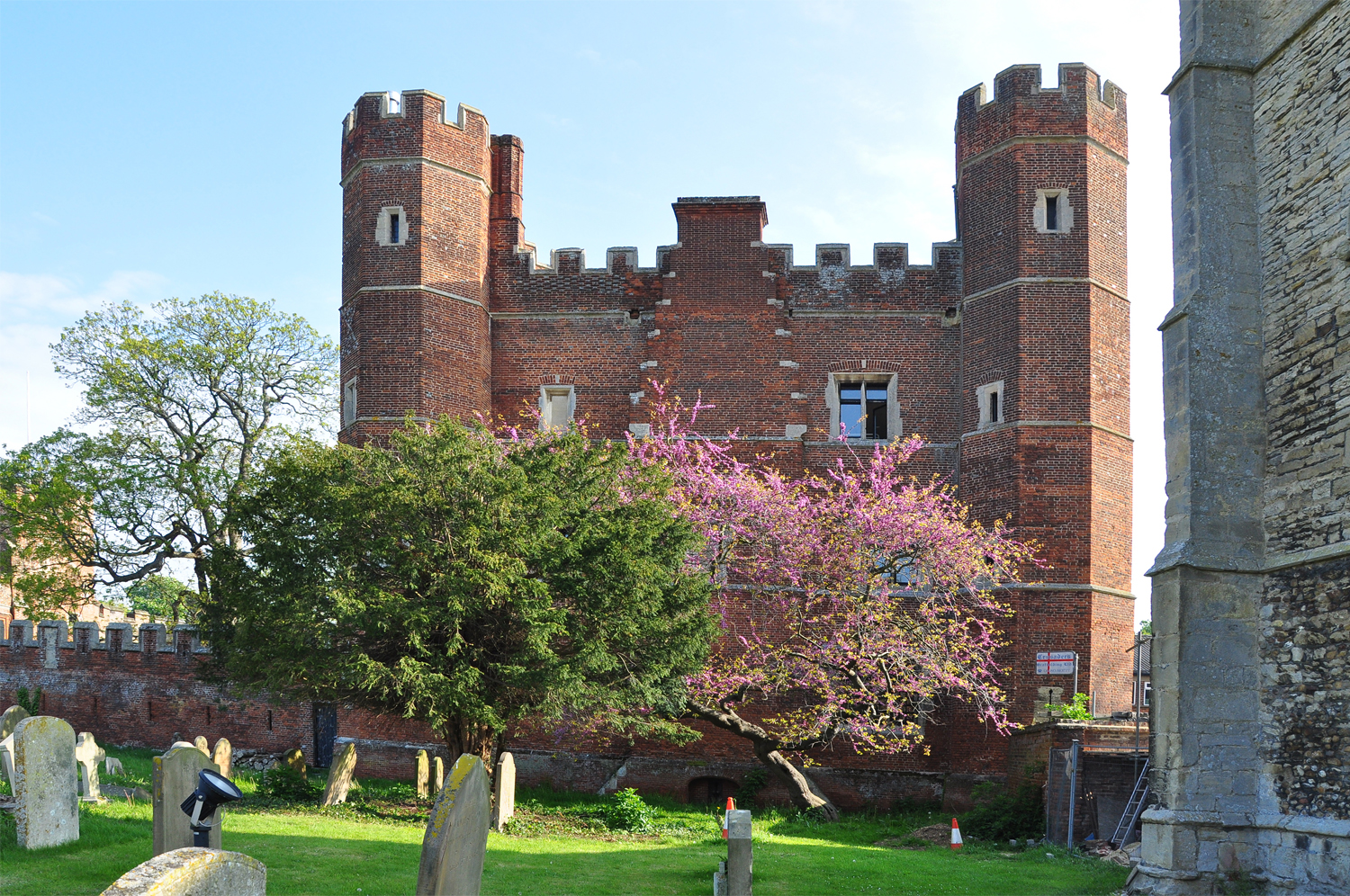
Buckden Towers

The community established the parish of the Immaculate Heart of Mary in Hayes in 1912 to offer services to Spanish speaking immigrants in the London area. The parish ministry continues to serve the different immigrant communities that pass through Hayes. Buckden Towers was left by a Mrs Edelston to the diocese of Northampton. It served as the Claretians Junior Seminary until 1965. Parish work was undertaken in the area, especially in the American Air bases at Chalveston, Alconbury and Molesworth. Then in 1969 the diocese of Northampton asked the Claretians to make Buckden Towers a parish under the title of St Hugh of Lincoln. The parish has grown in numbers and the Bishop of East Anglia asked the Claretians to take over the parish of St Neots as well in 2011. In 1997 the Claretians took over the multi-ethnic and multi-lingual parish of St Josephs, Leyton, Brentwood diocese.

=== MICLA - Claretians Missionaries of America ===
==== United States ====
===== California =====
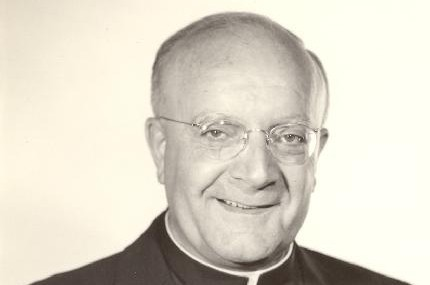
Aloysius Ellacuria, CMF

The Claretians came to Southern California by way of Mexico in the early 1900s, working in Los Angeles inner city missions. Since 1908 the Claretians have operated the historic La Iglesia de Nuestra Señora Reina de los Angeles in Pueblo de Los Angeles near Downtown Los Angeles, as well as Mission San Gabriel, one of the original Spanish missions in California.

A noted priest within the Claretian community who was active in the American Southwest was Aloysius Ellacuria, CMF (21 June 1905–6 April 1981). Born in Spain and arriving in Los Angeles, California, in 1931, Father Aloysius spent nearly fifty years within the order serving in the American Southwest, including Los Angeles, California (1930s–1970s); Phoenix, Arizona (1963–1966); and San Antonio, Texas (1966–1969). Father Aloysius is commonly described as a man of deep faith whose healing ministry impacted the lives of thousands of urban impoverished and sickly persons, and he is generally considered to have been a cleric with a mystical style. The cause for his canonization is under consideration by the Dicastery for the Causes of Saints after hundreds of requests prompted the Archdiocese of Los Angeles to refer the matter to the Roman Curia.

From 1952 to 1977 The Claretians also served from the Theological Seminary of Claretville and Immaculate Heart Claretian novitiate, on the former King Gillette Ranch in Calabasas, located in the Santa Monica Mountains of rural western Los Angeles County. The Thomas Aquinas College was also here from 1971 until moving to a permanent campus in Santa Paula, California in 1975. The land and structures are now part of Malibu Creek State Park.

The Claretians returned to their original Southern California location, the Dominguez Seminary near the Dominguez Rancho Adobe of Rancho San Pedro, in Rancho Dominguez, California near Long Beach.

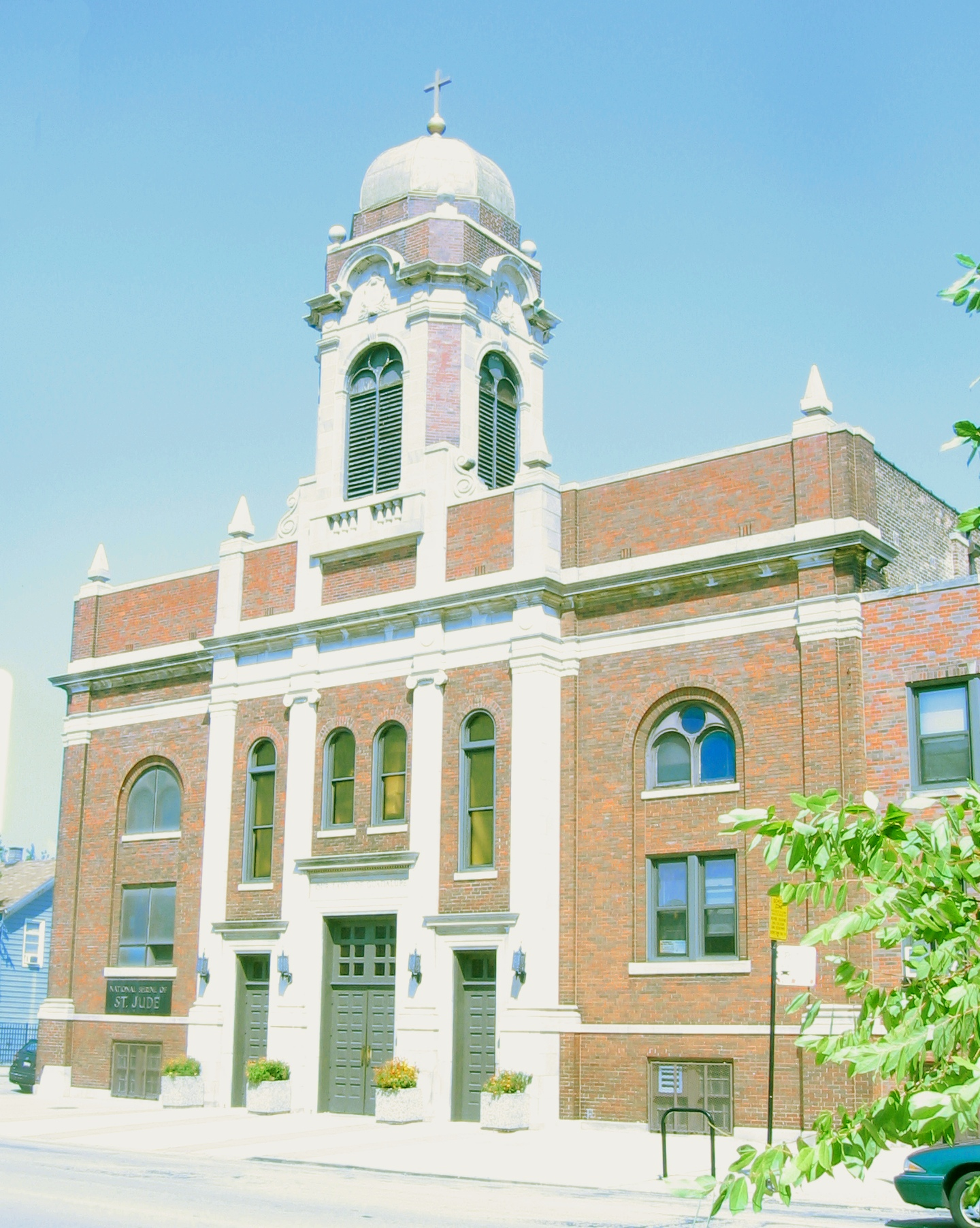
Our Lady of Guadelupe church, South Chicago, Chicago

===== National Shrine of St. Jude, Chicago =====
The national shrine of St. Jude was founded by James Tort, CMF, pastor of Our Lady of Guadalupe Church in Chicago, Illinois, United States. Many of Tort's parishioners were laborers in the nearby steel mills, which were drastically cutting back their work forces early in 1929. Tort was saddened to see that about 90% of his parishioners were without jobs and in difficult financial situations.

In an effort to lift the spirits of his parishioners, Tort began regular devotions to Saint Jude. The first novena honoring the saint was held on February 17, 1929. During the Depression of the 1930s and during World War II, thousands of men, women, and children attended novenas at the shrine and devotion to the patron saint of desperate causes spread throughout the country.

=== In South America ===
The Claretians divide their territorial presence in South America into provinces:

- Province of Colombia-Venezuela.
- Province of Colombia-Ecuador.
- Province of Brasil (Brasil, Mozambique).
- Province of Peru-Bolivia.
- Province of San José del Sur (Argentina, Chile, Paraguay, Uruguay).

=== ASCLA EAST- Asian Claretians East ===
==== In the Philippines ====
After the end of World War II, the Claretians arrived in the Philippines and took over Sta. Barbara Parish, Sta. Barbara, Pangasinan upon the invitation by the late Bishop Mariano Aspiras Madriaga, D.D. of the then Diocese of Lingayen-Dagupan. The first Claretian missionaries in the Philippines were Fr. Raymond Catalan, CMF, Fr. Arcadio Hortelano Martin, CMF and Fr. Thomas Mitchell, CMF. Through the years, the Claretians were able to establish different institutions like Claret Schools of Quezon City and Zamboanga, Claret College of Isabela, Claretian Publications Philippines (now Claretian Communications Foundation, Inc.). Likewise, they managed mission areas especially in Mindanao.

== Saints, Blesseds and other holy people ==
Saints

- Antoni Maria Claret i Clarà (23 December 1807 – 24 October 1870), Archbishop of Santiago de Cuba and founder of the Congregation, canonized on 7 May 1950

Blesseds

- Andrés Solá Molist (7 October 1895 - 25 April 1927), Martyr of the Cristero War, beatified on 20 November 2005
- Mateu Casals Mals and 108 Companions (died between July 1936 to March 1937), Martyrs of the Spanish Civil War from Barcelona, Lleida, and Valencia, beatified on 21 October 2017
- Felipe de Jesús Munárriz Azcona and 50 Companions (died August 1936), Martyrs of the Spanish Civil War from Barbastro, beatified on 25 October 1992
- José María Ruiz Cano and 15 Companions (died between July to October 1936), Martyrs of the Spanish Civil War from Siguenza and Fernan Caballero, beatified on 13 October 2013
- Jaume Mir Vime and 6 Companions (died between July to November 1936), Martyrs of the Spanish Civil War from the Archdiocese of Tarragona, beatified on 13 October 2013

Venerables

- Jaume Clotet Fabres (24 July 1822 - 4 February 1898), priest, declared Venerable on 13 May 1989
- Mariano Avellana Lasierra (16 April 1844 - 14 May 1904), priest, declared Venerable on 23 October 1987

Servants of God

- Francesc Crusats Franch (5 January 1831 - 30 September 1868), martyr
- Pere Marcer Cuscó (1 October 1854 - 17 August 1927), professed religious
- Miquel Palau Vila (4 June 1868 - 16 October 1929), priest
- Angelo Cantons Fornells (5 April 1895 - 9 June 1967), priest, declared as Servant of God on 11 October 1984
- Juan Luis Ellacuria Echevarría (21 June 1905 - 6 April 1980), priest, declared as Servant of God on 11 April 2016
- Rhoel Gallardo (29 November 1965 – 3 May 2000), Filipino missionary and martyr

== See also ==
- List of shrines#United States
