= Cubao =

Cubao may refer to:

- Cubao, Quezon City, a district of Quezon City, Metro Manila, Philippines
  - Araneta Center–Cubao station (LRT) on Line 2
  - Araneta Center–Cubao station (MRT) on Line 3
  - Cubao Cathedral
  - Ramon Magsaysay (Cubao) High School
  - Roman Catholic Diocese of Cubao
  - SM Cubao, now SM Araneta City, a SM Supermall
