= Parang, Maguindanao del Norte =

Municipality in Maguindanao del Norte, Philippines

Parang ڤارڠ
- Municipality
- Municipality of Parang
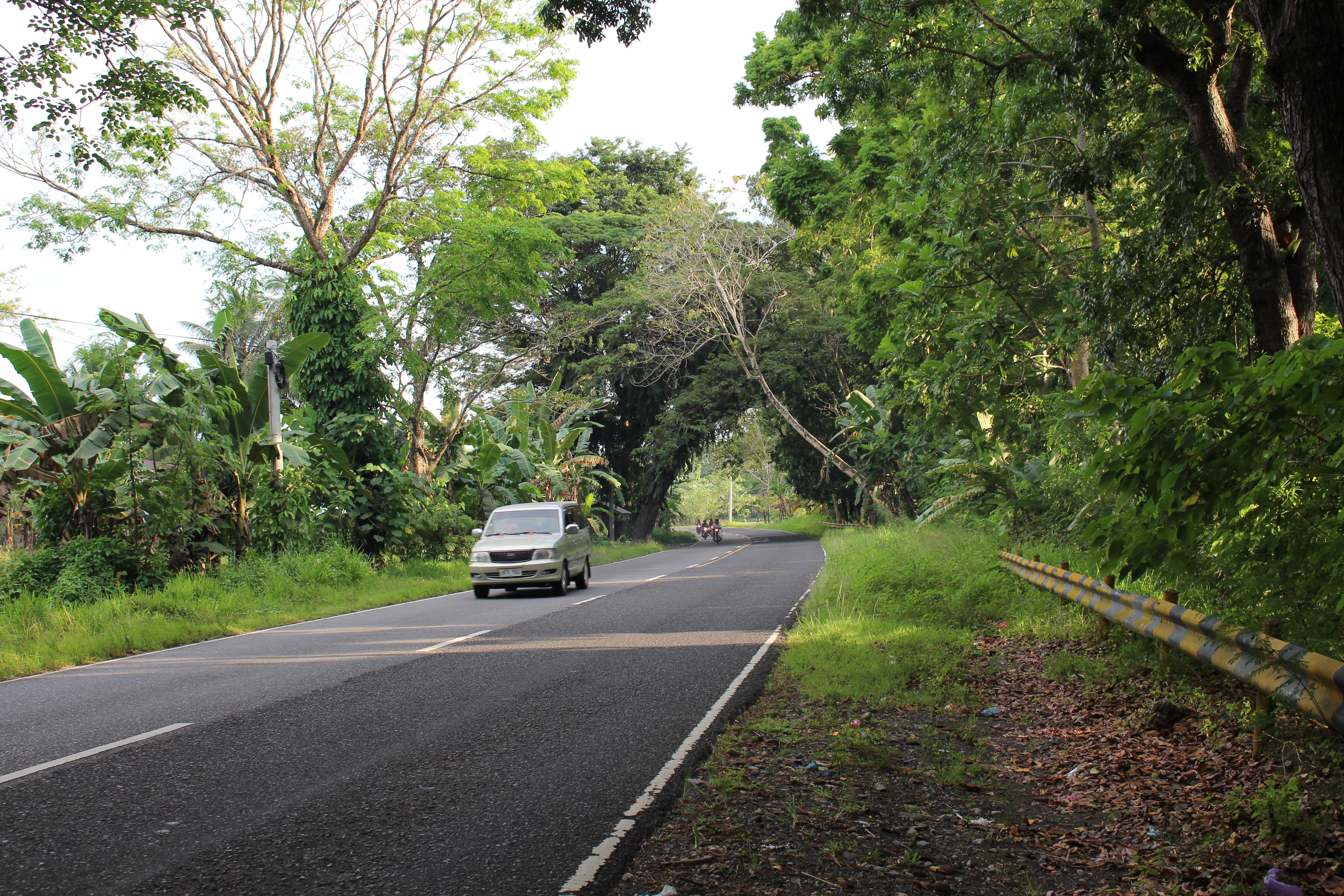
- Simuay-Parang-Landasan Road

- Seal

- Map of Maguindanao del Norte with Parang highlighted
- Interactive map of Parang
- Location within the Philippines
- Coordinates: 7°22′28″N 124°16′07″E
- Country: Philippines
- Region: Bangsamoro Autonomous Region in Muslim Mindanao
- Province: Maguindanao del Norte
- House district: Lone district
- Parliamentary district: 2nd district
- Founded: August 18, 1947
- Barangays: 25 (see Barangays)

Government
  - Type: Sangguniang Bayan
  - Mayor: Cahar P. Ibay
  - Vice Mayor: Abdul Aziz "Mahal" T. Ali
  - House Representative: Sittie Shahara "Dimple" I. Mastura
  - Municipal Council: Members: Abo M. Talib III; Esmael D. Ganduan; Noraina A. Ito; Habib D. Shyfullah; Cyrelle Mari G. Saavedra; Zacaria M. Kasim; Norhaina K. Dicay; Margan T. Fernandez
  - Electorate: 60,367 voters (2025)

Area
  - Total: 850.78 km^{2} (328.49 sq mi)
- Elevation: 57 m (187 ft)
- Highest elevation: 366 m (1,201 ft)
- Lowest elevation: 0 m (0 ft)

Population (2024 census)
  - Total: 123,209
  - Density: 144.82/km^{2} (375.08/sq mi)
  - Households: 17,712

Economy
  - Income class: 1st municipal income class
  - Poverty incidence: 27.11% (2023)
  - Revenue: ₱ 564.3 million (2024)
  - Assets: ₱ 438.5 million (2024)
  - Expenditure: ₱ 556.6 million (2024)
  - Liabilities: ₱ 162.5 million (2024)

Service provider
  - Electricity: Maguindanao Electric Cooperative (MAGELCO)
- Time zone: UTC+8 (PST)
- ZIP code: 9604
- PSGC: 1903811000
- IDD : area code: +63 (0)64
- Native languages: Maguindanao; Iranun; Tagalog
- Website: www.lgu-parang.gov.ph

Parang, officially the Municipality of Parang (Maguindanaon: Inged nu Parang, Jawi: ايڠايد نو ڤارڠ; Iranun: Inged a Parang, ايڠايد ا ڤارڠ; Tagalog: Bayan ng Parang), is a municipality in the province of Maguindanao del Norte, Philippines. According to the 2024 census, it had a population of 123,209.

Parang is the seat of government of the Bangsamoro. However the relevant infrastructure are yet to be put in place.

== History ==
The history of Parang traces back to the era when it used to be an integral part of the Maguindanao Sultanate. In June 1851, the Spanish military government based in Zamboanga sent forces to Polloc, presently a barangay of Parang, and seized it. Having a natural deep water harbor, the Spanish then set up a fortress and a naval base at Polloc, from which they would launch military operations against the Moros of the Pulangui Valley.

Polloc eventually grew into a small town that by 1860 it was home to 600 Christians and 50-60 Chinese traders along with people from other walks of life. In 1884, a road was built between Polloc and the other town of Cotabato, which was founded ten years later than Polloc in 1861 and now served as the capital of the 5th Military District of Cotabato in which Polloc was part of.

The Americans took over local affairs when the Spanish evacuated at the aftermath of the Philippine-American War in 1901 and American authorities replaced them. When political reorganization of the Philippines took place in 1917 under the Insular Government, Polloc was made part of the newly created municipal district of Parang, which also became part of the new province of Cotabato. Parang was created as a municipality on August 18, 1947, through Executive Order No. 82 signed by President Manuel Roxas. The modern Polloc Port, which form the main part of the present-day Polloc Freeport and Economic Zone currently based in Barangay Polloc in Parang, was built in 1977 and currently serves as the primary trans-shipment port in the Bangsamoro.

Former Hukbalahap members formed the bulk of migrants who later settled Parang, as well as in Buldon and other Muslim-majority towns in Mindanao.

The boundary with Nuling (now Sultan Kudarat) was fixed twice through executive orders by President Elpidio Quirino in 1949 and in 1953.

In 1961, through Republic Act No. 3419, twelve barrios and twenty sitios were separated as the municipality of Buldon. In 1973, Parang was annexed to the new province of Maguindanao. In 1975, through Presidential Decree No. 780, six barangays were separated as the municipality of Matanog.

Parang was among those municipalities where series of battles occurred, leading to the fall of Camp Abubakar in 2000. It was also part of the province of Shariff Kabunsuan from October 2006 until its nullification by the Supreme Court in July 2008.

On September 18, 2022, Parang became part of the newly created province of Maguindanao del Norte as a result of the Maguindanao division plebiscite. On June 19, 2023, the Bangsamoro Transition Authority Parliament approved a bill transferring the regional center of Bangsamoro from Cotabato City to Parang.

== Geography ==
It is bordered to the north by Barira and Matanog, on the east by Buldon, and on the south is Sultan Kudarat.

=== Barangays ===
Parang is politically subdivided into 25 barangays. Each barangay consists of puroks while some have sitios.

- Bongo Island (Litayen)
- Campo Islam
- Cotongan
- Datu Macarimbang Biruar
- Gadungan
- Gadungan Pedpandaran
- Guiday T. Biruar
- Gumagadong Calawag
- Kabuan
- Landasan (Sarmiento)
- Limbayan
- Macasandag
- Magsaysay
- Making
- Manion
- Moro Point
- Nituan
- Orandang
- Pinantao
- Poblacion
- Poblacion II
- Polloc
- Samberen
- Tagudtongan
- Tuca-Maror

=== Climate ===
Climate data for Parang, Maguindanao del Norte
Month	Jan	Feb	Mar	Apr	May	Jun	Jul	Aug	Sep	Oct	Nov	Dec	Year
Mean daily maximum °C (°F)	28 (82)	28 (82)	29 (84)	29 (84)	27 (81)	26 (79)	26 (79)	26 (79)	27 (81)	26 (79)	27 (81)	27 (81)	27 (81)
Mean daily minimum °C (°F)	19 (66)	19 (66)	19 (66)	20 (68)	21 (70)	20 (68)	20 (68)	20 (68)	20 (68)	20 (68)	20 (68)	19 (66)	20 (68)
Average precipitation mm (inches)	53 (2.1)	44 (1.7)	41 (1.6)	39 (1.5)	69 (2.7)	89 (3.5)	92 (3.6)	97 (3.8)	72 (2.8)	79 (3.1)	72 (2.8)	49 (1.9)	796 (31.1)
Average rainy days	15.3	13.5	16.3	16.9	22.3	23.5	22.5	23.1	19.4	21.5	20.6	17.5	232.4
Source: Meteoblue (modeled/calculated data, not measured locally)

== Demographics ==
Population census of Parang
Year	Pop.	±% p.a.
1903	603	—
1918	1,933	+8.08%
1939	4,495	+4.10%
1948	13,413	+12.92%
1960	37,296	+8.89%
1970	31,667	−1.62%
1975	32,506	+0.53%
1980	46,003	+7.19%
1990	55,355	+1.87%
1995	49,562	−2.05%
2000	60,935	+4.53%
2007	102,247	+7.40%
2010	73,328	−11.40%
2015	89,194	+3.80%
2020	102,914	+3.06%
2024	123,209	+4.42%
Source: Philippine Statistics Authority

== Economy ==
Poverty Incidence of Parang

Source: Philippine Statistics Authority

Gross Domestic Product

The Gross Domestic Product of the municipality (2022) is ₱24,067,200,000.

== Tourism ==
A cultural festival is held every August 18, the founding anniversary of Parang. Events are organized by the municipal government with the participation of various stakeholders.

Tourist attractions in Parang include:

- Golf course in Camp S.K. Pendatun
- Zone Beach
- Punta Beach
- White Sand Beach in Limbayan, Bongo Island
- Molina-Muñoz Farm Resort
- Fruit Bats Sanctuary
- Bacolod Street
- Simento White Camp

== Infrastructure ==
=== Transportation ===
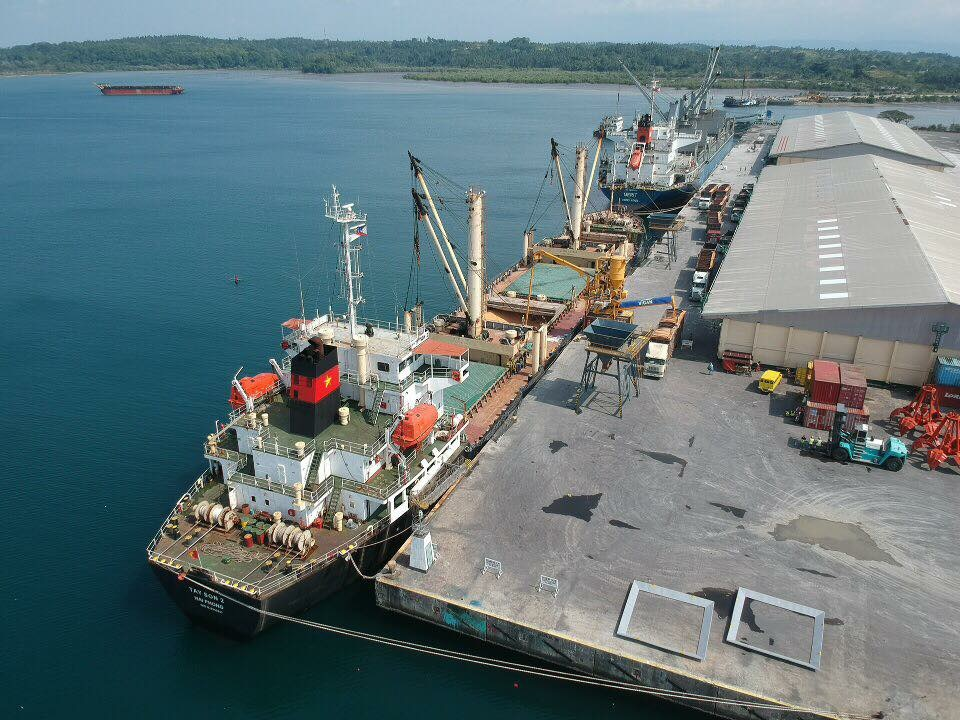
Polloc Port

Major sea vessels connect Polloc Port to Manila and other Philippine cities.

Parang is connected by road with its neighboring towns through the Narciso Ramos Highway, a component of the Pan-Philippine Highway.

Tricycles are the main modes of public transport in the municipality. Several shuttle vans and jeepneys provide regular trips to Cotabato City and other municipalities.

=== Health ===
- 1 District Hospital
- 1 Rural Health Unit
- 1 Private Hospital
- 1 Medical/Dental Hospital(PNP)
- 1 Medical Diagnostic Laboratory

=== Utilities ===
MAGELCO (Maguindanao Electric Cooperative, Inc.) provides electric power to the locality. Inland barangays use solar power installed by donor agencies.

== Education ==
- Tertiary: 3 private schools
- Secondary: 5 public schools; 3 private schools
- Elementary: 14 public schools; 4 private schools
- Primary: 14 public schools
- Pre-School: 2 public schools; 5 private schools

== Notable individuals ==
- Elías Lumayog Ayuban, Jr. – second Bishop of Cubao, born in Barangay Landasan (Sarmiento).
- Delfin Lorenzana - 26th Secretary of National Defense.
- Apollo Quiboloy - founder of Kingdom of Jesus Christ, and the "Appointed Son of God".

== Sister cities ==
- Cotabato City, Philippines
