= Elias Ayuban =

Filipino prelate (born 1968)

His Excellency, The Most Reverend Elias Lumayog Ayuban Jr. CMF DD JCD
- Bishop of Cubao; Apostolic Administrator of Parañaque
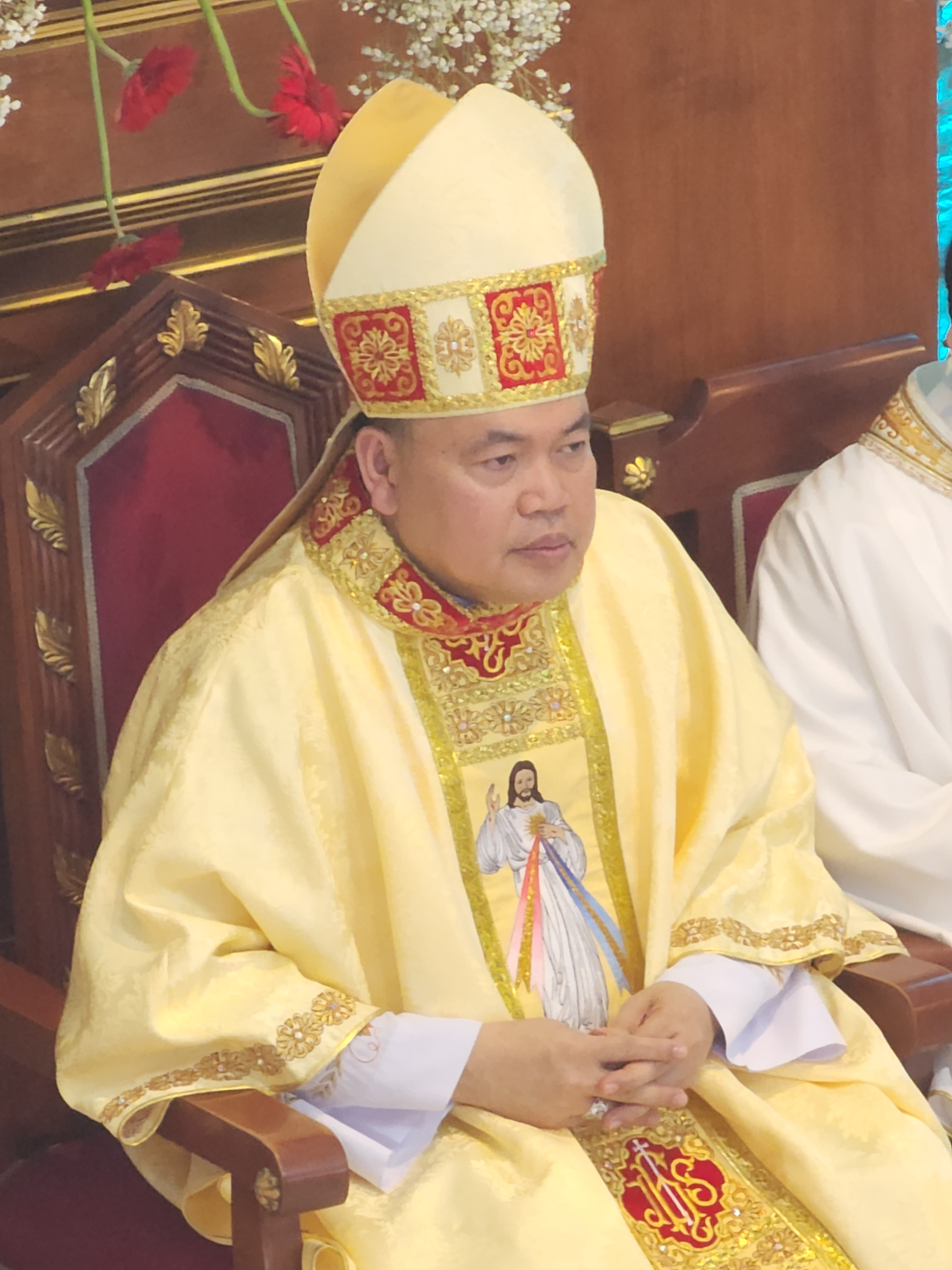
- Ayuban in 2025
- Church: Catholic Church
- Province: Manila
- See: Cubao
- Appointed: October 4, 2024
- Installed: December 3, 2024
- Predecessor: Honesto Ongtioco
- Other posts: Apostolic Administrator of Parañaque (2026-present); Chairman, CBCP Episcopal Commission on Mutual Relations (2025–present)
- Previous posts: Provincial Superior, Father Rhoel Gallardo Province of the Claretian Missionaries (2019–2024); Co-Chairperson, Conference of Major Superiors in the Philippines (2022–2024)

Orders
- Ordination: March 9, 1996 by Crisostomo Yalung
- Consecration: December 3, 2024 by Jose Advincula

Personal details
- Born: January 1, 1968 (age 58) Parang, Cotabato (present-day Maguindanao del Norte), Philippines
- Residence: Bishop's Residence, Cubao, Quezon City
- Education: Saint Anthony Mary Claret College; Ateneo de Manila University; Pontifical Lateran University
- Motto: Misericordes sicut Pater (Latin for 'Be merciful, just as your Father is merciful') (Note: From Luke 6:36)
- Coat of arms: Elias Lumayog Ayuban Jr.'s coat of arms

Ordination history
History
Priestly ordination
- Ordained by: Crisostomo Yalung
Episcopal consecration
- Principal consecrator: Jose Advincula
- Co-consecrators: Honesto Ongtioco; Alberto Uy

Styles of Elias L. Ayuban, Jr.
- Reference style: His Excellency; The Most Reverend
- Spoken style: Your Excellency
- Religious style: Bishop

Elias Lumayog Ayuban Jr. C.M.F. (born January 1, 1968) is a Filipino Claretian prelate of the Catholic Church. He is the second and current Bishop of Cubao, having succeeded Honesto Ongtioco in December 2024. He is the current Apostolic Administrator of the Diocese of Parañaque since June 2026.

== Early life and education ==
Ayuban was born on January 1, 1968, in Barrio Landasan, Parang, which was then part of the former province of Cotabato and currently under Maguindanao del Norte.

He studied philosophy at the Saint Anthony Mary Claret College and theology at the Ateneo de Manila University, both in Quezon City.

In 2003, he received a doctorate in canon law from the Pontifical Lateran University in Rome.

== Ministry ==
=== Priesthood ===
Ayuban professed his religious vows on July 16, 1995, and was ordained a priest on March 9, 1996, in Quezon City. His first assignment from 1996 to 2000 was as parish priest of Risen Christ Church in Tungawan, Zamboanga Sibugay. He subsequently held various local positions and served in the Vatican. Ayuban also held academic roles at the Institute for Consecrated Life Asia, Claret Theology House in Quezon City, and the University of Santo Tomas.

In January 2019, Ayuban was elected provincial superior of the Claretian Missionaries in the Philippines, succeeding Eduardo Apungan. On November 20, 2021, under his leadership, the Claretian Missionaries renamed their province after Rhoel Gallardo, a Claretian priest who was abducted, tortured, and martyred in Basilan by the Abu Sayyaf in May 2000. Following his appointment as a bishop in October 2024, he was succeeded as provincial superior by Amador Tumbaga.

In July 2022, he was elected co-chairperson of the Conference of Major Superiors in the Philippines (CMSP).

=== Episcopate ===
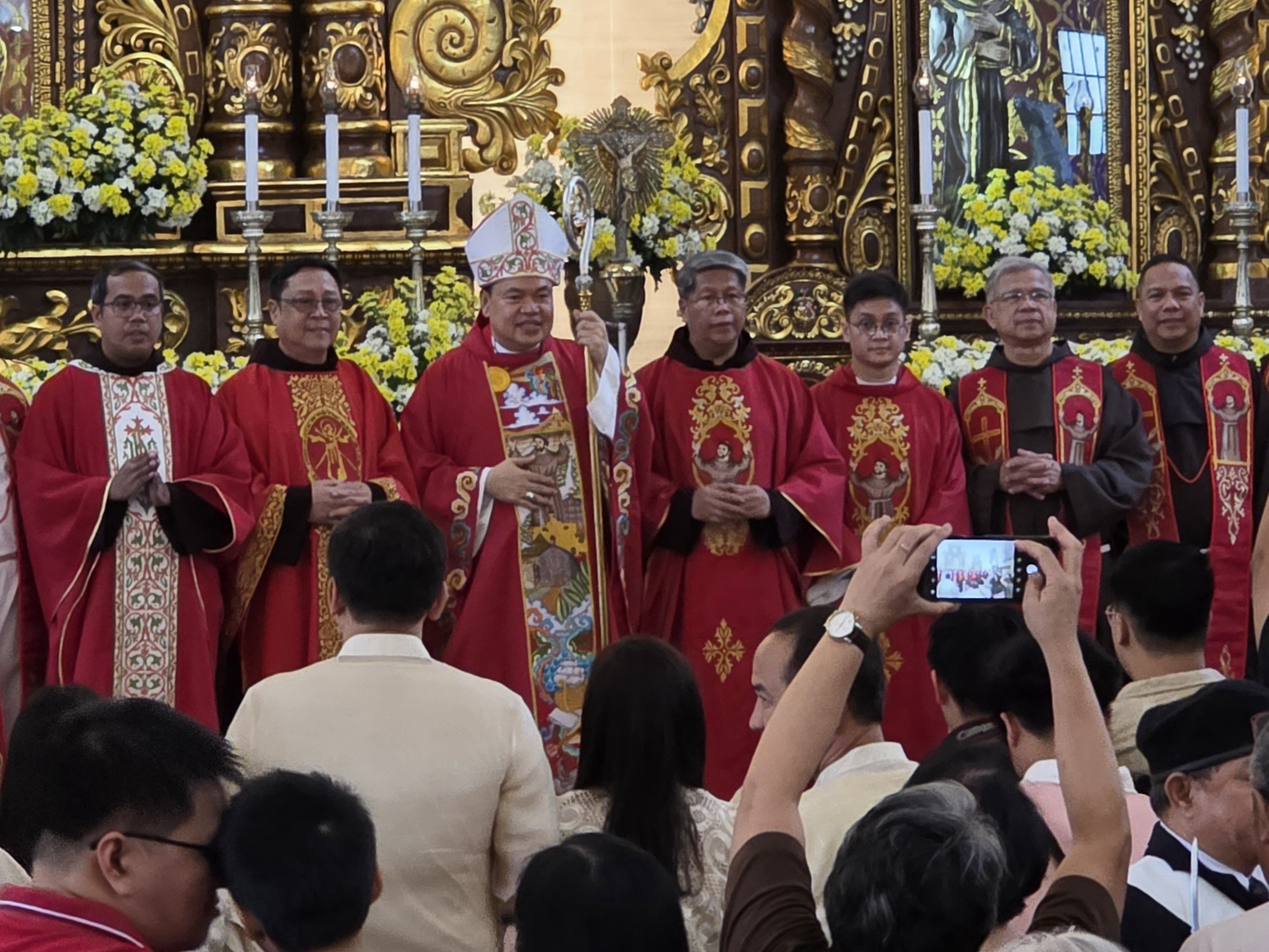
Ayuban (third from left) with Franciscan friars at the Basilica Minore de San Pedro Bautista in 2026

On October 4, 2024, Pope Francis appointed Ayuban as the second bishop of Diocese of Cubao, succeeding Honesto Ongtioco. He is the second Filipino Claretian bishop to be appointed a bishop after Leo Dalmao of the Prelature of Isabela de Basilan. Ayuban's episcopal ordination and canonical installation took place at Cubao Cathedral on December 3, 2024, on the feast of Saint Francis Xavier.

On November 21, 2025, the president of the Catholic Bishops' Conference of the Philippines (CBCP), Cardinal Pablo Virgilio David, appointed Ayuban to the National Tribunal of Appeals as its bishop-moderator.

On June 6, 2026, Pope Leo XIV appointed Ayuban as the Apostolic Administrator of the Diocese of Parañaque, following the retirement of Bishop Jesse Mercado, who reached the mandatory age of retirement for bishops on his 75th birthday.

== Political positions ==
Ayuban publicly makes his positions in sociopolitical issues through editorials and social media posts. He wrote a piece critical of then-President Rodrigo Duterte and his remarks of God being "stupid" in a 2018 column in La Croix International.

He supported then-Vice President Leni Robredo's presidential campaign for the 2022 election. In response to President Bongbong Marcos' win in that race, Ayuban used the hashtag "#NeverAgain", a rallying cry opposing the dictatorship of Marcos' father, former President Ferdinand Marcos. Writing for the CBCP, Ayuban also made known his position against legalizing civil divorce in the Philippines.

In response to the testimony of 18 former members of the Philippine Marines during a Senate Blue Ribbon Committee hearing on 4 June 2026, Ayuban refuted their claim that Fr. Flavie Villanueva of the Society of the Divine Word (SVD) received suitcases of cash in a Church allegedly located in Mindanao Avenue. The Diocese of Cubao further clarified that there is no Church run by the SVD located at Mindanao Avenue as mentioned by the "ex-Marines"; the SVD-run Parishes are located in Kamuning (Sacred Heart Parish-Shrine), E. Rodriguez Ave. (Diocesan Shrine of Jesus the Divine Word), and Sto. Niño de Violago Quasi-Parish. He denounced disinformation as the work of the devil.

== Notes ==
Catholic Church titles
Preceded by Eduardo Apungan	Provincial Superior of Claretians in the Philippines (Father Rhoel Gallardo Province); January 17, 2019 – December 3, 2024	Succeeded by Amador C. Tumbaga
Preceded by Honesto Ongtioco	Bishop of Cubao; December 3, 2024 – present	Incumbent
