= Mount Carmel Shrine (Quezon City) =

Roman Catholic Marian shrine and basilica in Quezon City, Philippines

- Basilica of the National Shrine of Our Lady of Mount Carmel
- Basílika at Pambansáng Dambana ng Mahál na Birhen ng Bundók del Carmen (Filipino); Basílica Menor del Santuario Nacional de Nuestra Señora del Carmen (Spanish)
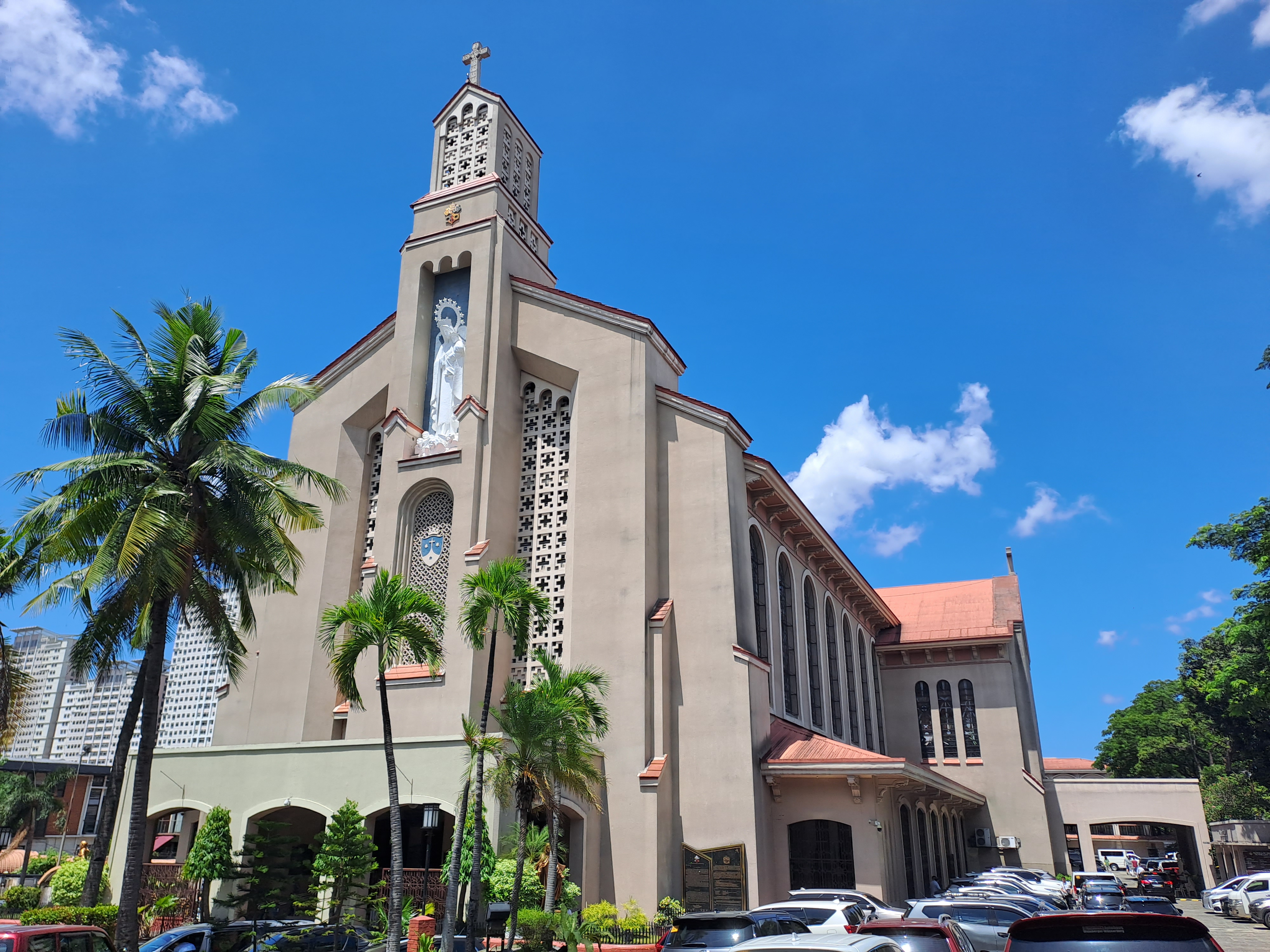
- The basilica’s façade in 2023
- Mount Carmel Shrine
- 14°36′52″N 121°01′51″E
- Location: Quezon City
- Country: Philippines
- Denomination: Roman Catholic
- Sui iuris church: Latin Church
- Religious order: Discalced Carmelites

History
- Status: Minor Basilica, National Shrine, Cathedral
- Dedication: Our Lady of Mount Carmel
- Consecrated: July 16, 1964

Architecture
- Functional status: Active
- Architect(s): Máximo Vicente, Jr.
- Architectural type: Basilica, Catedral
- Style: Modern, Neo-Romanesque
- Groundbreaking: December 30, 1954
- Completed: July 16, 1964

Specifications
- Length: 84.5 m (277 ft)

Administration
- Province: Manila
- Metropolis: Manila
- Archdiocese: Manila
- Diocese: Cubao
- Deanery: Holy Family
- Parish: Our Lady of Mount Carmel

Clergy
- Rector: Rev. Paulo N. Gamboa, Jr., OCD

The Basilica of the National Shrine of Our Lady of Mount Carmel, commonly known as Mount Carmel Shrine, is a Roman Catholic minor basilica and national shrine located in Barangay Mariana, Quezon City in the Philippines. Dedicated to Our Lady of Mount Carmel, it is under the jurisdiction of the Diocese of Cubao under the Vicariate of the Holy Family. The church opened in 1964 after a decade of construction and was declared a parish church in 1975, a national shrine in 2015, and a minor basilica in 2019, the country’s fifteenth.

The church celebrates its liturgical feast day every July 16, in honour of Our Lady of Mount Carmel.

== History ==
=== Early devotion and missionaries ===
Devotion to Our Lady of Mount Carmel in the Philippines began in the 1600s, when the Augustinian Recollects received an image of Our Lady of Mount Carmel from Carmelites nuns in the Viceroyalty of New Spain (modern Mexico).

In 1923, a group of four Carmelite nuns arrived in the Philippines, and they set up a convent in Jaro, Iloilo City. The Carmelite fathers followed in 1947, focusing their missionary work in the northern part of Quezon province (present-day Aurora). In 1952, during a meeting with then-Apostolic Nuncio to the Philippines Archbishop Egidio Vagnozzi and the Prior General of the Carmelite Order, the former asked for more Carmelites to be sent to the country to establish a monastery and church in Manila.

In response to Vagnozzi's request, a group of Irish Discalced Carmelite friars sent to the Philippines initially considered building along either Horseshoe Drive or Gregorio Araneta Avenue, both in Quezon City. However, in 1954 they chose a cogon grass field on Broadway Avenue, part of Hacienda de Magdalena owned by Doña Magdalena Hashim Ysmael-Hemady (a Lebanese-Filipino balae or in-law of then-Senator Claro M. Recto).

In the 1950s, residents of New Manila would hear Mass at the nearby Immaculate Conception Cathedral in Cubao, which served as the local parish church. Other churches for the community were Christ the King Mission Seminary along E. Rodriguez Sr. Avenue, or the Discalced Carmelite Convent of Saint Thérèse along Gilmore Avenue. Some would walk or drive as far as Santa Mesa Church (now Sacred Heart of Jesus Parish) in Santa Mesa, Manila or the new Santo Domingo Church along Quezon Avenue.

=== Construction and opening ===
The cornerstone of Mount Carmel Church was blessed on December 30, 1954. It was dedicated and consecration a decade later on July 16, 1964, the feast day of Our Lady of Mount Carmel, with Cardinal-Archbishop of Manila Rufino Santos officiating.

The church eventually became a popular location for filming wedding scenes, and later for actual weddings. This is attributed to the lower fees charged by the shrine compared to other churches, and the long aisle favoured by many brides.

On February 17, 1975, the church was made a parish by Cardinal-Archbishop of Manila Jaime Sin.

=== Contemporary ===
From 2015 to 2016, the altar was renovated. Its interior was also painted for the first time since it was built in 1954. On December 14, 2015, the parish was solemnly declared a national shrine.

On February 20, 2017, the shrine was granted a special bond of spiritual affinity with the Papal Basilica of Saint Mary Major in Rome, along with plenary indulgences for pilgrims in perpetuity. On November 30, 2018, the Holy See approved the petition by the Diocese of Cubao to elevate the shrine to the rank of minor basilica; it was officially declared as such on March 25, 2019, the Solemnity of the Annunciation, making it the first basilica in the diocese.

== Shrine details ==
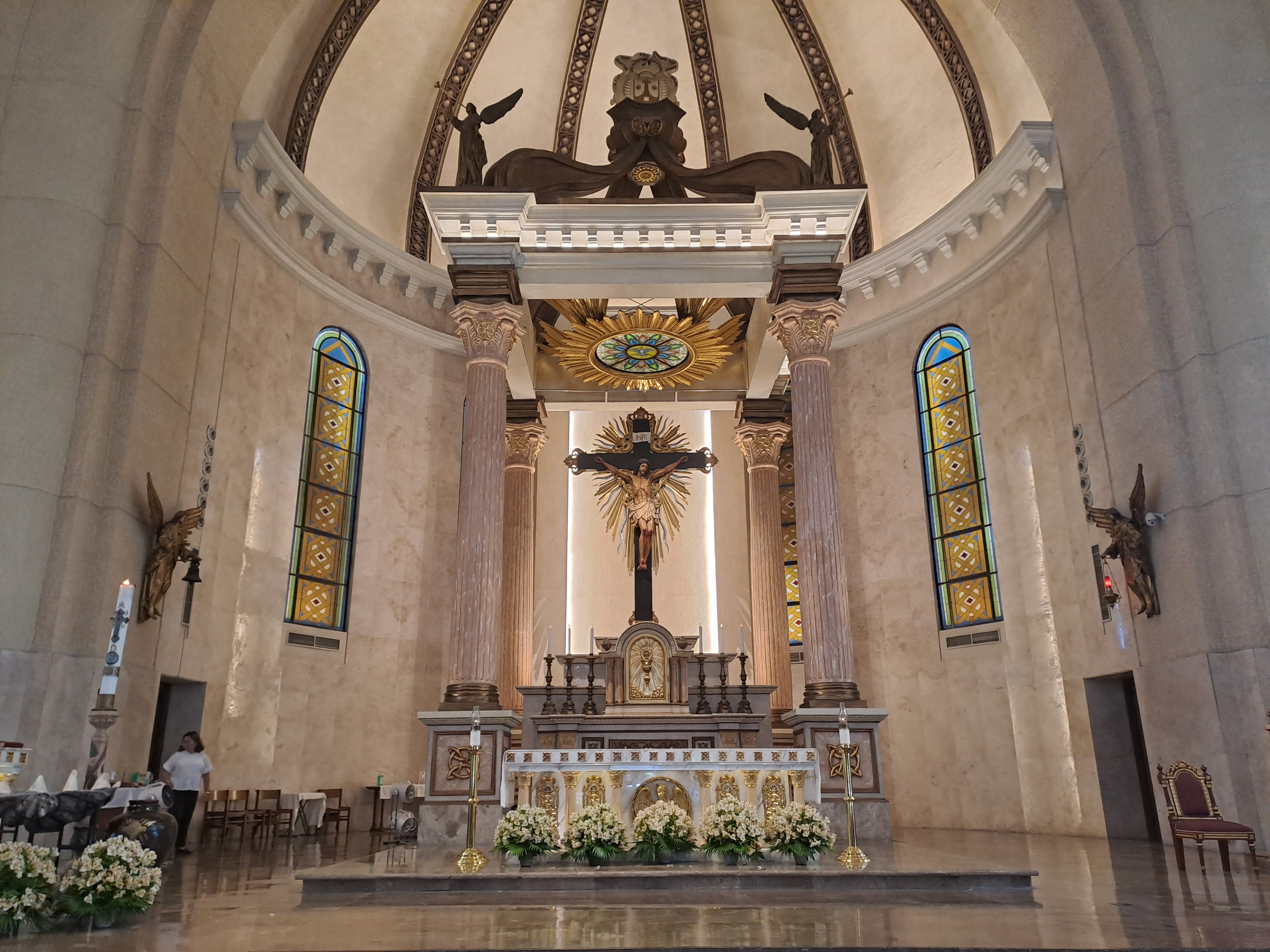
The high altar under its ciborium in apse

Designed by Architect Máximo Vicente Jr. in the Modernist style, the shrine is built according to a Latin cross (cruciform) footprint within a 17,155-square-meter (184,650 sq ft) complex fronting Broadway Avenue and between 4th and 5th Streets.

Aside from the main altar, the church has two side altars: the Saint Joseph altar on the gospel side (left), and the Our Lady of Mount Carmel altar on the epistle side (right). Since 2019, a relief of the papal arms has been placed above the Virgin’s side altar, as well at the main façade above the image’s niche, signifying the shrine’s status as a minor basilica.

The stained glass windows in the nave’s clerestory depict the pictorial cycle known as the Life of the Virgin, beginning with her childhood and ending her Assumption and Coronation. Transept windows depict scenes from the lives of Saint Joseph, Saint Teresa of Ávila, Saint John of the Cross, Saint Thérèse of Lisieux, and Prophet Elijah (considered the father of the Carmelites). The triforium under the windows features large high relieves in polychromed wood depicting the fourteen Stations of the Cross. These were restored and transferred from the southern side aisle, which has since become the Seat of Wisdom Chapel enshrining a seated image of Our Lady of Mount Carmel, as well as statues of Carmelite saints and blesseds. The opposite side aisle contains a Calvario altar as well as images of other saints for public veneration.

The crypt also has three air-conditioned mortuary chapels with a capacity of 50 to 150 seats, as well as an indoor and outdoor columbarium. The basilica complex also has a detached baptistery dedicated to Saint Raphael Kalinowski by the south transept along 4th Street, function halls for rent, and the Candle Chapel where worshippers can offer lit candles. Behind the main shrine is the Discalced Carmelite Saint John of the Cross Seminary.

== Venerated Marian image ==
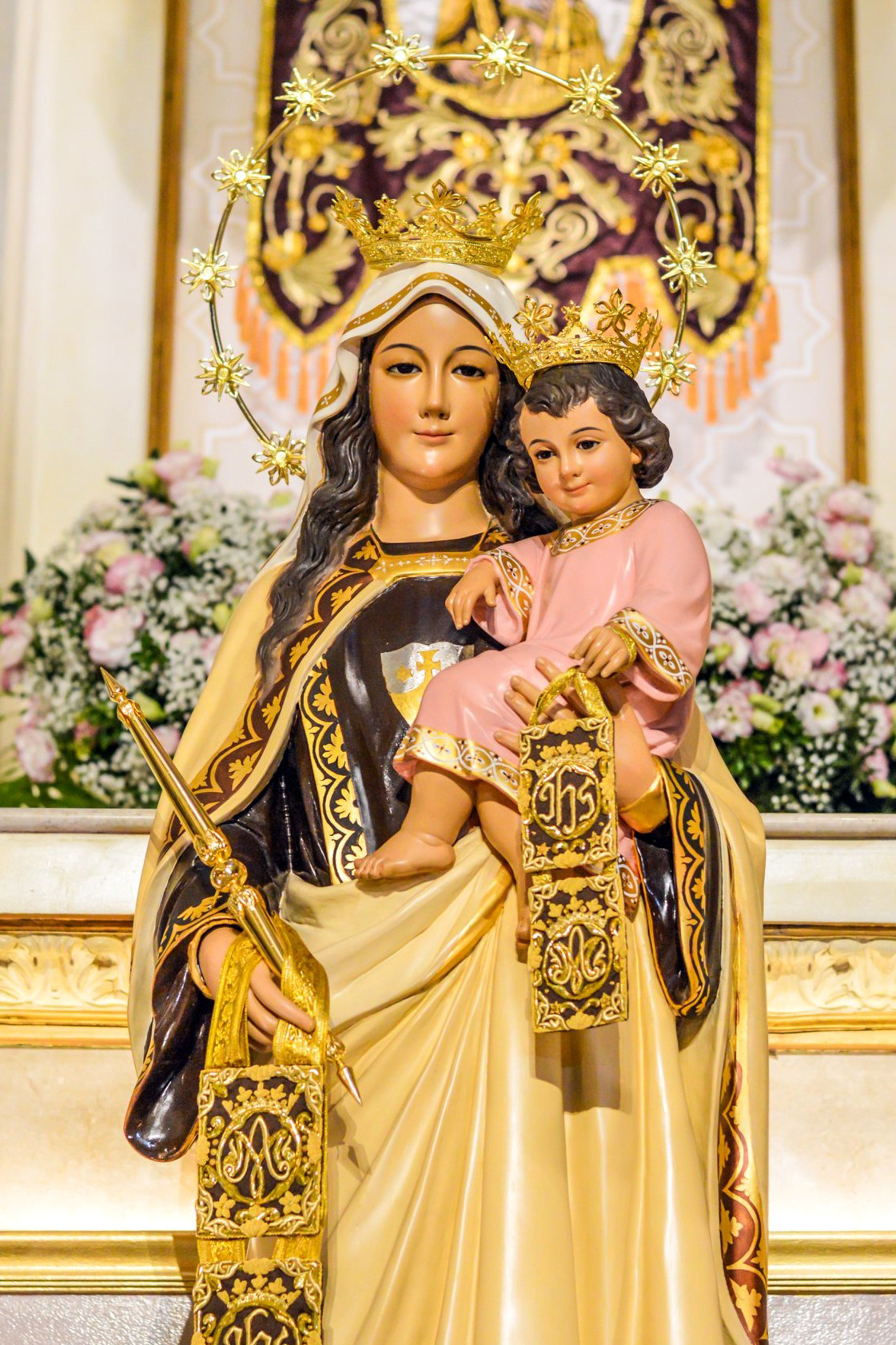
The venerated Marian image at its coronation in 2020

The venerated image of Our Lady of Mount Carmel is placed at the right side altar of the basilica. The de tallado image was designed and sculpted by Vicente Jr.'s father, Máximo Vicente, Sr. (1885–1964), who is hailed as a master sculptor of religious images with his own workshop, Talleres de Máximo Vicente.

The de tallado image depicts the Virgin Mary with the Child Jesus on her left arm and a sceptre in her right hand. Both wear golden crowns, with the Virgin clothed in the full Carmelite habit, and the Child in a pink robe. Both also hold fabric Brown Scapulars embroidered with a Christogram and the Auspice Maria. Her halo is a circle of twelve stars, identifying her as the Woman of the Apocalypse, while her peana (base) is of clouds with four putti.

On February 20, 2017, the venerated image had its episcopal coronation, granted by the diocesan bishop.

On May 13, 2020, the feast day of Our Lady of Fátima, Pope Francis approved the petition for its canonical coronation, although the Diocese of Cubao announced it two months later, on July 9. The image was canonically crowned on August 15, the Feast of the Assumption of Mary.

== Gallery ==
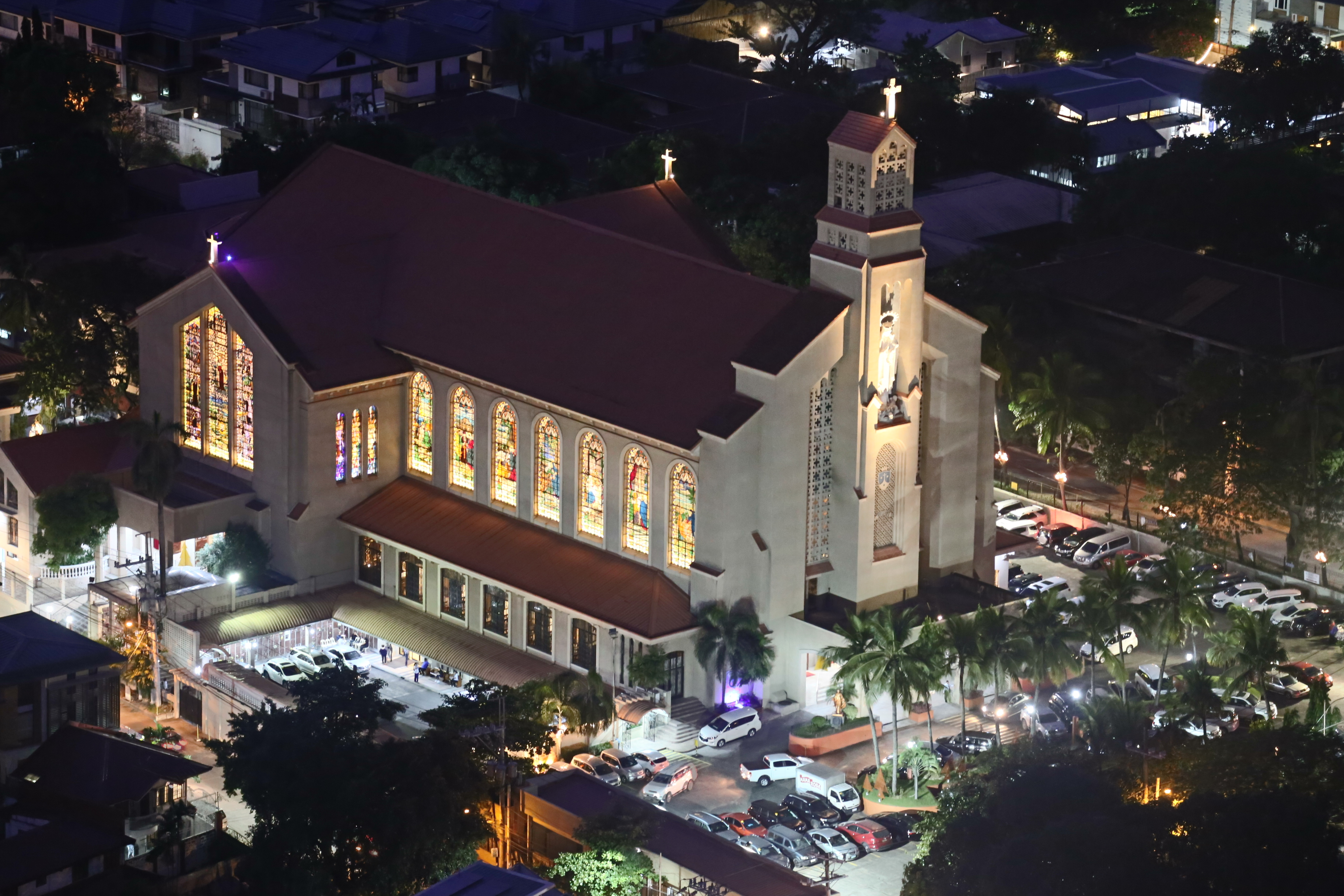
Aerial view of the shrine

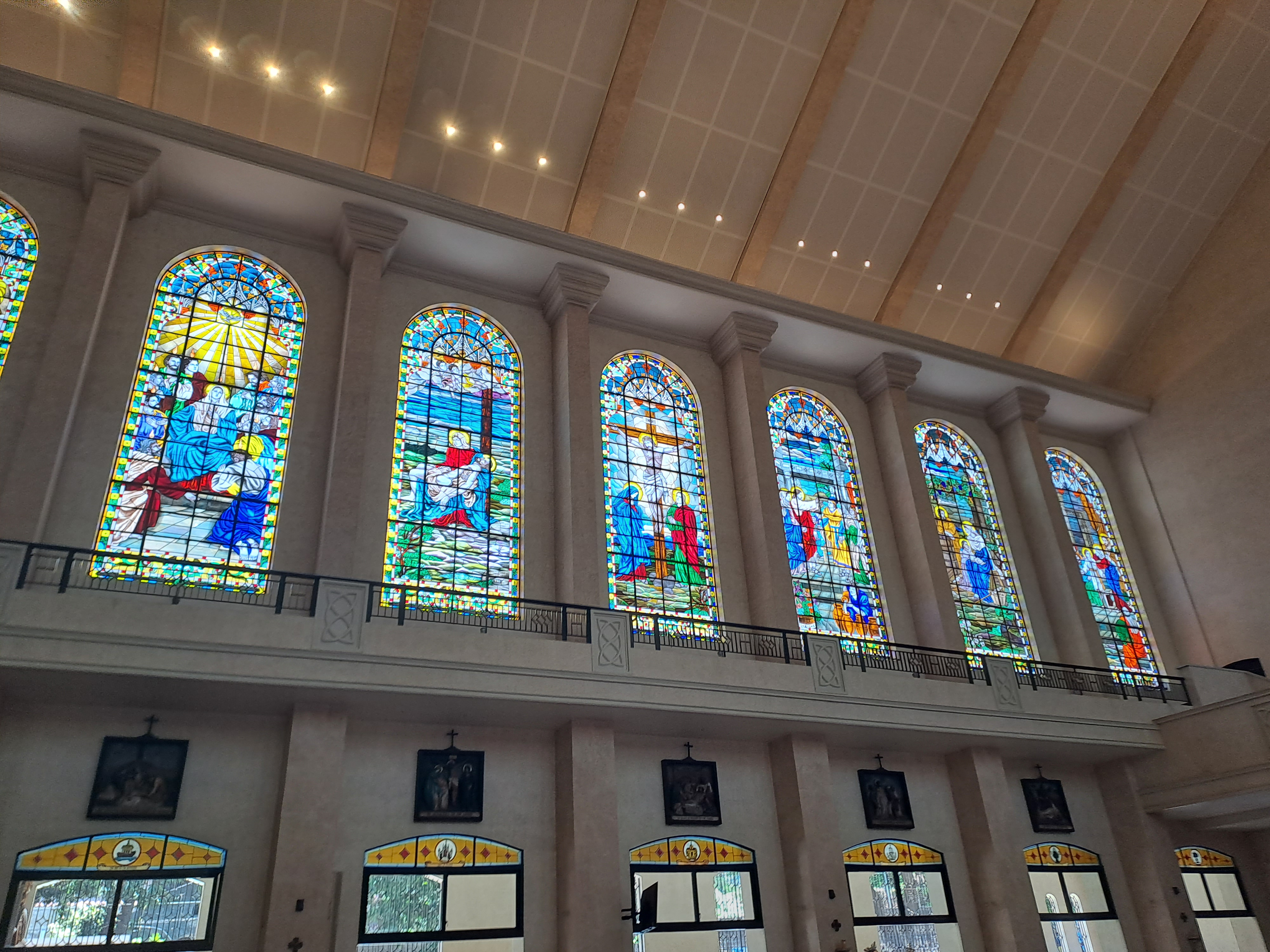
Stained glass windows

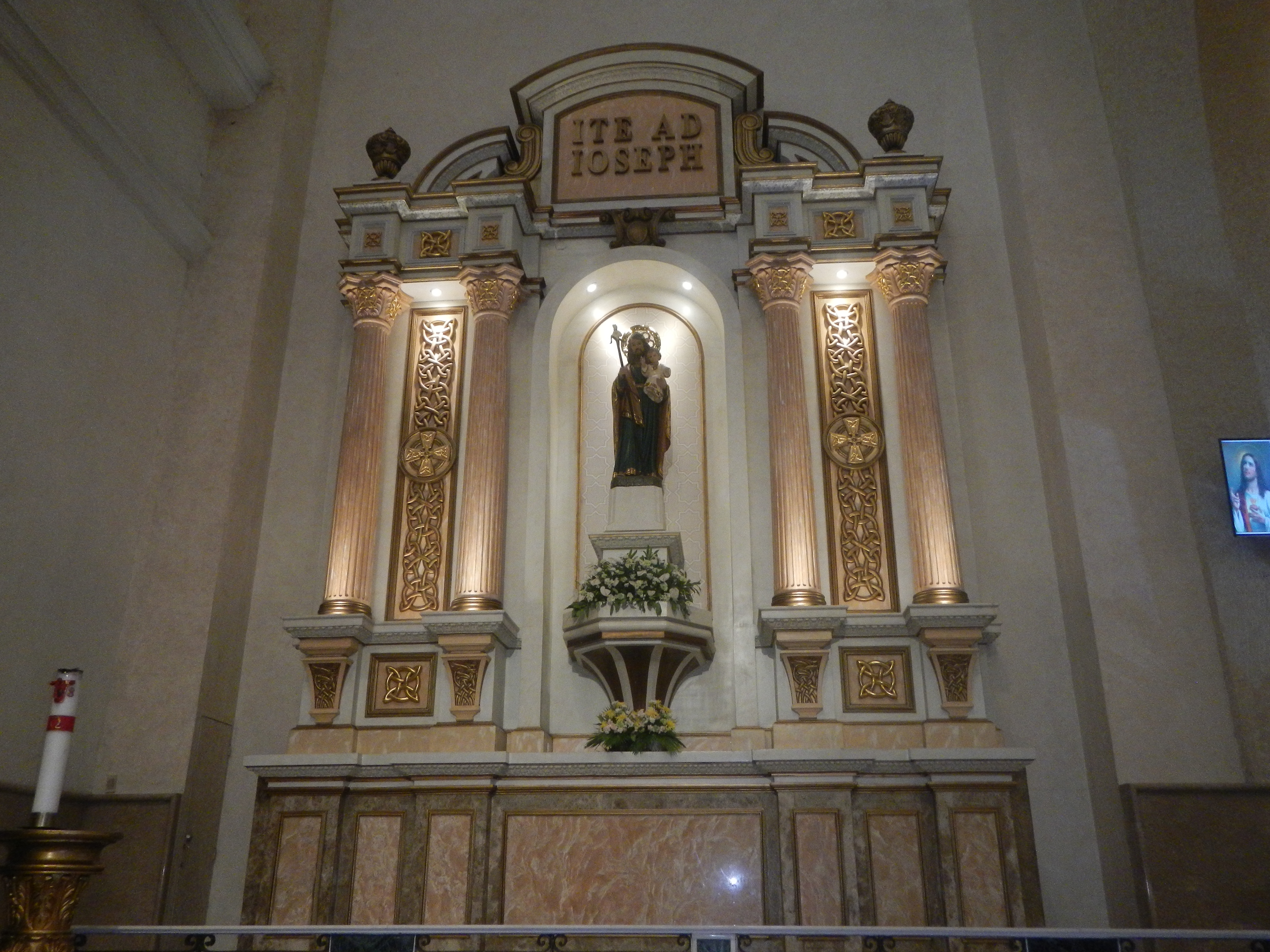
Saint Joseph side altar

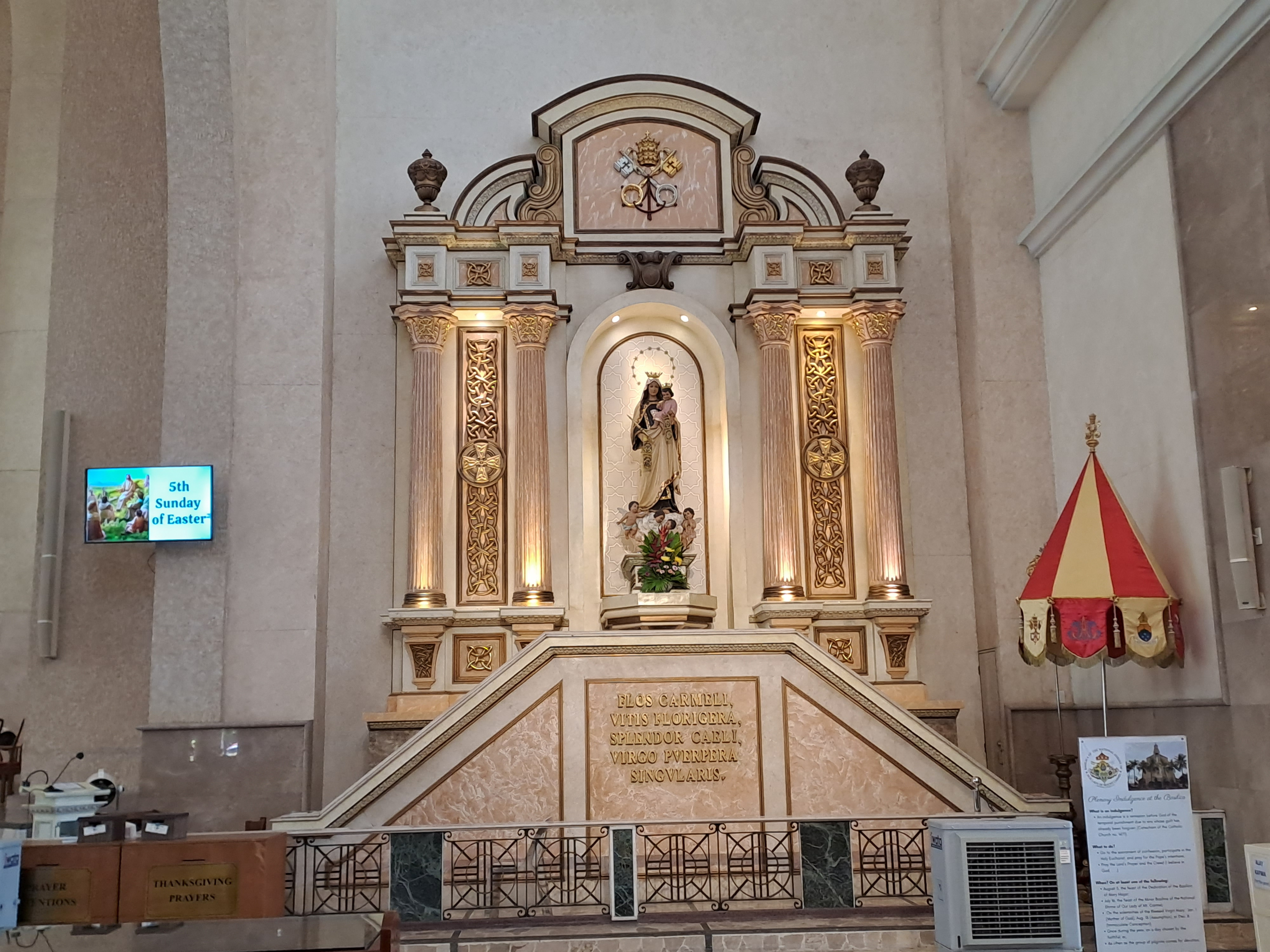
Our Lady of Mount Carmel side altar, with the umbraculum.

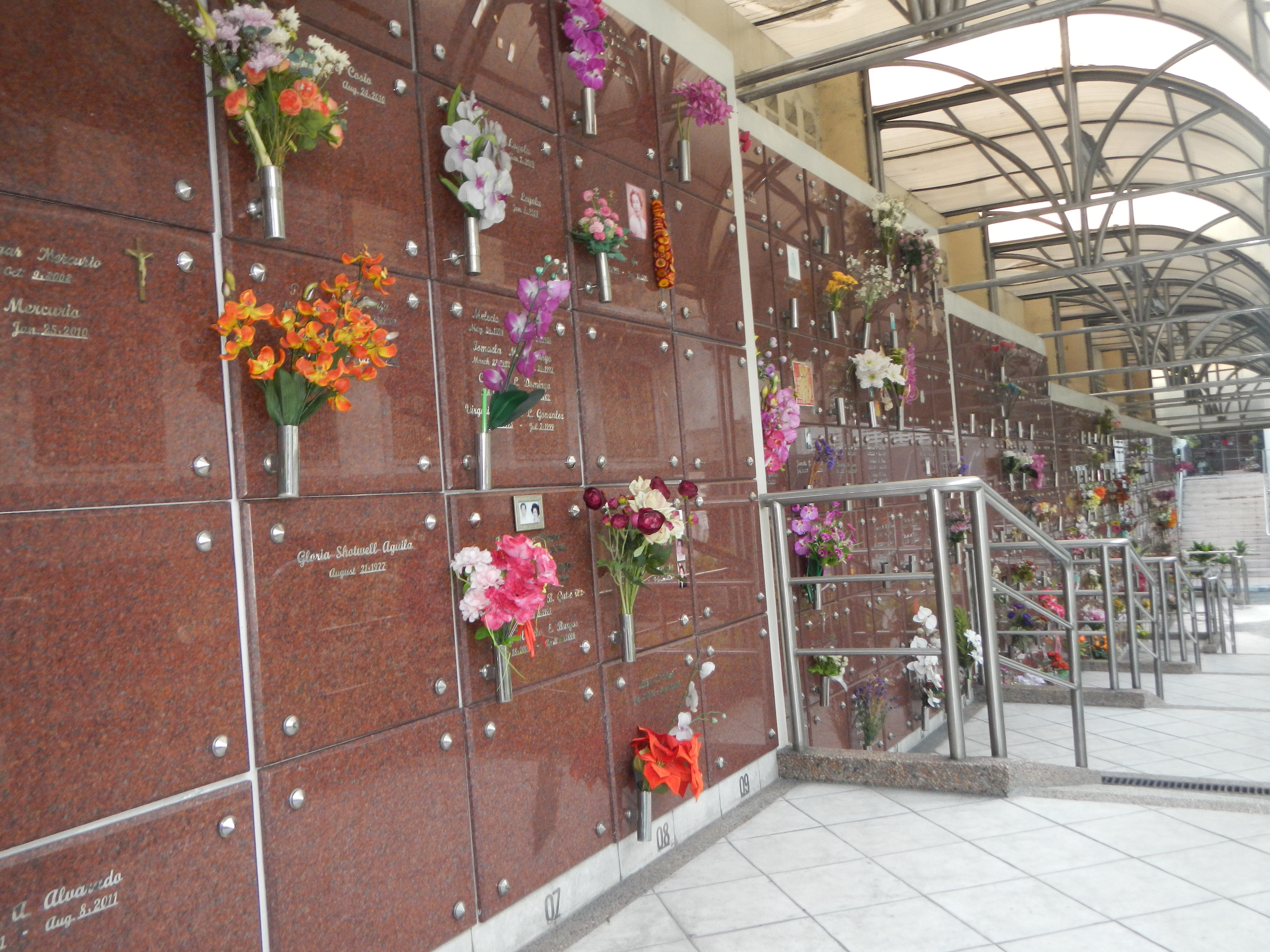
Columbarium

== See also ==
- San Sebastian Church (Manila)
- Our Lady of Mount Carmel
- List of Catholic basilicas
- List of Roman Catholic churches in Metro Manila
