= Cubao Cathedral =

Catholic cathedral in Quezon City, Philippines

- Immaculate Conception Cathedral of Cubao
- Katedral ng Kalinis-linisang Paglilihi ng Cubao (Filipino); Catedral de la Inmaculada Concepción de Cubao (Spanish)
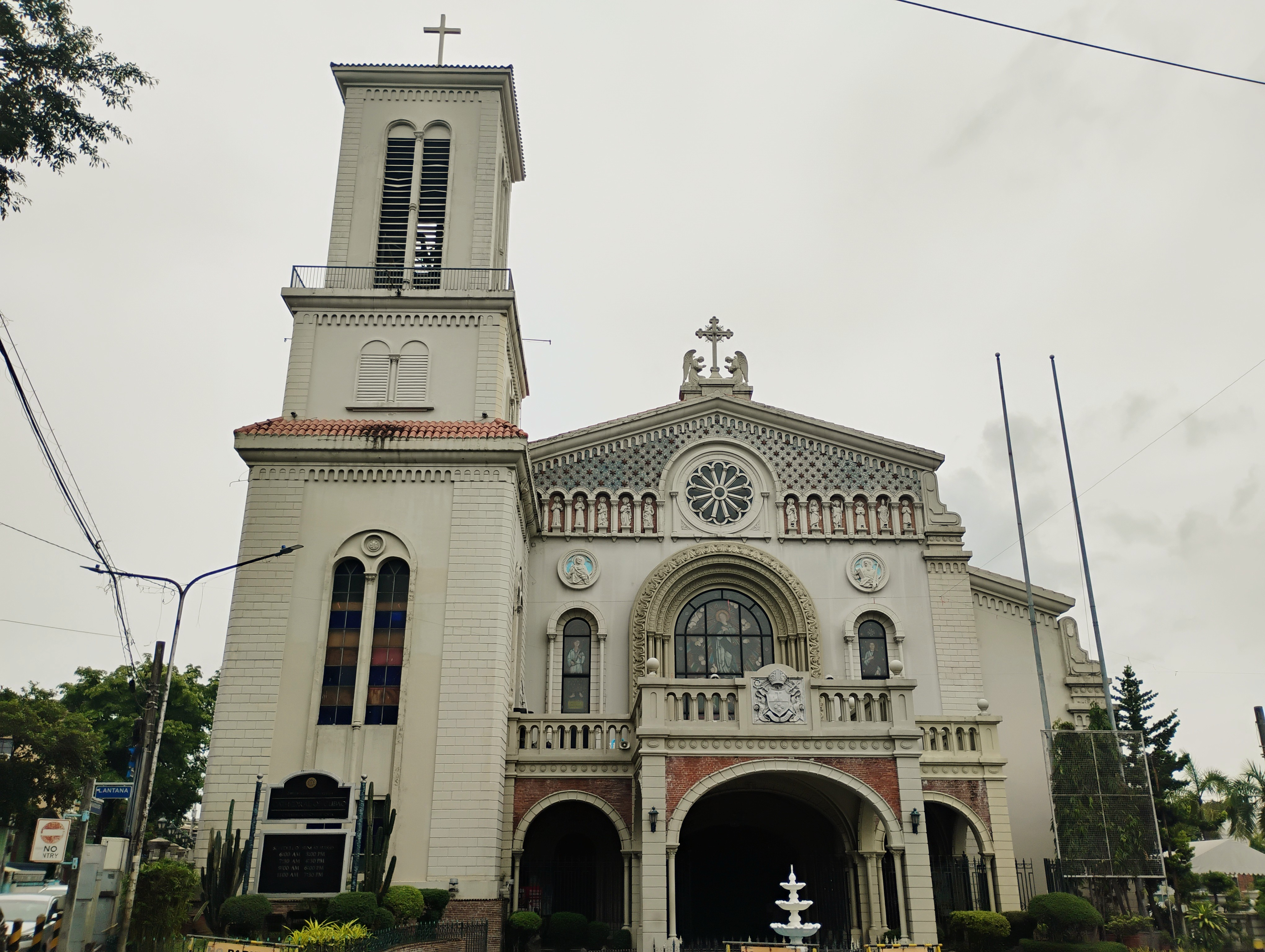
- Cathedral facade in June 2025
- Cubao Cathedral
- 14°37′19″N 121°02′36″E
- Location: Cubao, Quezon City
- Country: Philippines
- Denomination: Catholic Church
- Sui iuris church: Latin Church
- Website: Cubao Cathedral

History
- Former name: The Immaculate Conception Parish of Cubao
- Status: Cathedral
- Founded: July 15, 1950; 76 years ago
- Dedication: Immaculate Conception
- Dedicated: August 14, 2003; 22 years ago

Architecture
- Functional status: Active
- Architectural type: Cathedral
- Style: Romanesque Revival

Administration
- Province: Manila
- Metropolis: Manila
- Archdiocese: Manila
- Diocese: Cubao
- Deanery: Holy Family
- Parish: Immaculate Conception

Clergy
- Bishop: Elias Ayuban CMF
- Rector: Steven C. Zabala
- Vicar: Julius Callanga

The Immaculate Conception Cathedral of Cubao, commonly known as Cubao Cathedral, is a Roman Catholic cathedral located in Quezon City, Metro Manila, the Philippines. It is the episcopal seat of the Roman Catholic Bishop of Cubao. Built in 1950 by the Society of the Divine Word (SVD), it belonged to the order until 1990, when the Archdiocese of Manila took over its administration. In 2003, when the Diocese of Cubao was erected, the parish was elevated into the status of cathedral. The present rector of the cathedral is Steven C. Zabala.

== History ==
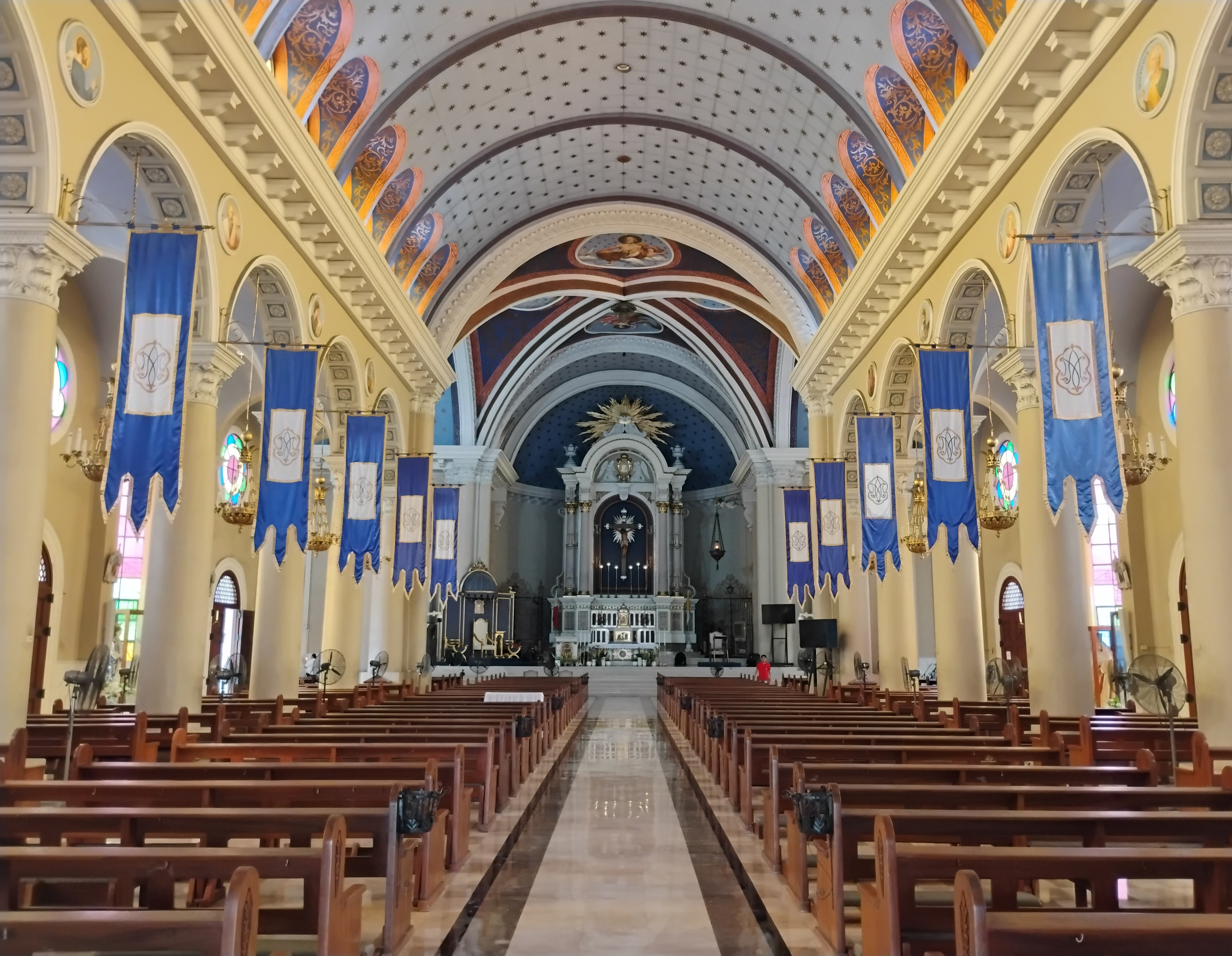
Cathedral interior in 2025

In 1935, the SVD priests of Christ the King Mission Seminary began ministering to a limited farming community around Manga Road in Cubao by first celebrating Mass in a small chapel near the present Cubao roundabout. Henry Demond then celebrated Mass in the house of a certain Carbonell family, then moved to a quonset mess hall from the Second World War that stood on what are now Spencer and Brooklyn streets. The building was abandoned by the combined US-Philippine Commonwealth Armed Forces.

As with other agrarian communities, farmers tilling the area's rice paddies invoked San Isidro Labrador, so the chapel was dedicated to him and belonged to Sacred Heart Parish in the Kamuníng area. While teaching as theology professor at Christ the King Mission Seminary (and later as Prefect of Scholastics), Ambrosio Manaligod and Ronnie Ganancias consistently helped with the pastoral work of the parish, especially in directing lay organizations.

In 1949, the chapel was re-dedicated to the Immaculate Conception. On July 15, 1950, the community chapel was elevated into a parish, with the first curé being the Argentine priest Juan Simón (1950–1954); he was succeeded by the German priests Alois Vogel (1954-1956) and Benito Rixner (1956–1958). For years, the parish remained under the SVD, as it was near the order's main residence at Christ the King Mission Seminary.

In 1989, the SVD offered the parish to the Archdiocese of Manila in keeping with the missionary spirit found in their constitutions. The official handover took place on Easter Sunday, 1990, with Reynaldo Celso as the first secular or diocesan parish priest. Due to an increase in the population of Catholics in Metro Manila, the archdiocese was gradually partitioned, with the Diocese of Cubao erected on August 28, 2003. The parish was selected to be the see for the new bishop, and extensive renovations on the church were carried out soon after.

On December 30, 2014, GMA Network, actor Dingdong Dantes and actress Marian Rivera were married at the cathedral, where Dantes was christened. Considered as one of the most expensive church weddings held in the country, guests included then-President Benigno S. Aquino III as the principal sponsor, other politicians, the couple's colleagues from the television and film industry, and various celebrities.

== Ecclesiastical territory ==
The Immaculate Conception Cathedral once belonged to the Archdiocese of Manila, but is now the seat of the Diocese of Cubao. However, it currently remains a parish as a part of the Vicariate of the Holy Family.

=== Parochial bounds ===
The parish itself is bounded to the north by a creek running Eulogio Rodriguez Sr. and Ermín García Avenues; to the east by EDSA; to the south by Col. Bonny Serrano Avenue (Santolan Road); and to the southwest by a small portion of Ermitaño Creek, parts of Horseshoe Village, N. Domingo Street and Balete Drive.

Surrounding parishes are Sacred Heart to the north; Nativity of Our Lord and Our Lady of Perpetual Help to the east; and the Minor Basilica and National Shrine of Our Lady of Mount Carmel to the west. To the south is San Juan, which is under the jurisdiction of the Archdiocese of Manila.

== Cathedral priests and rectors ==
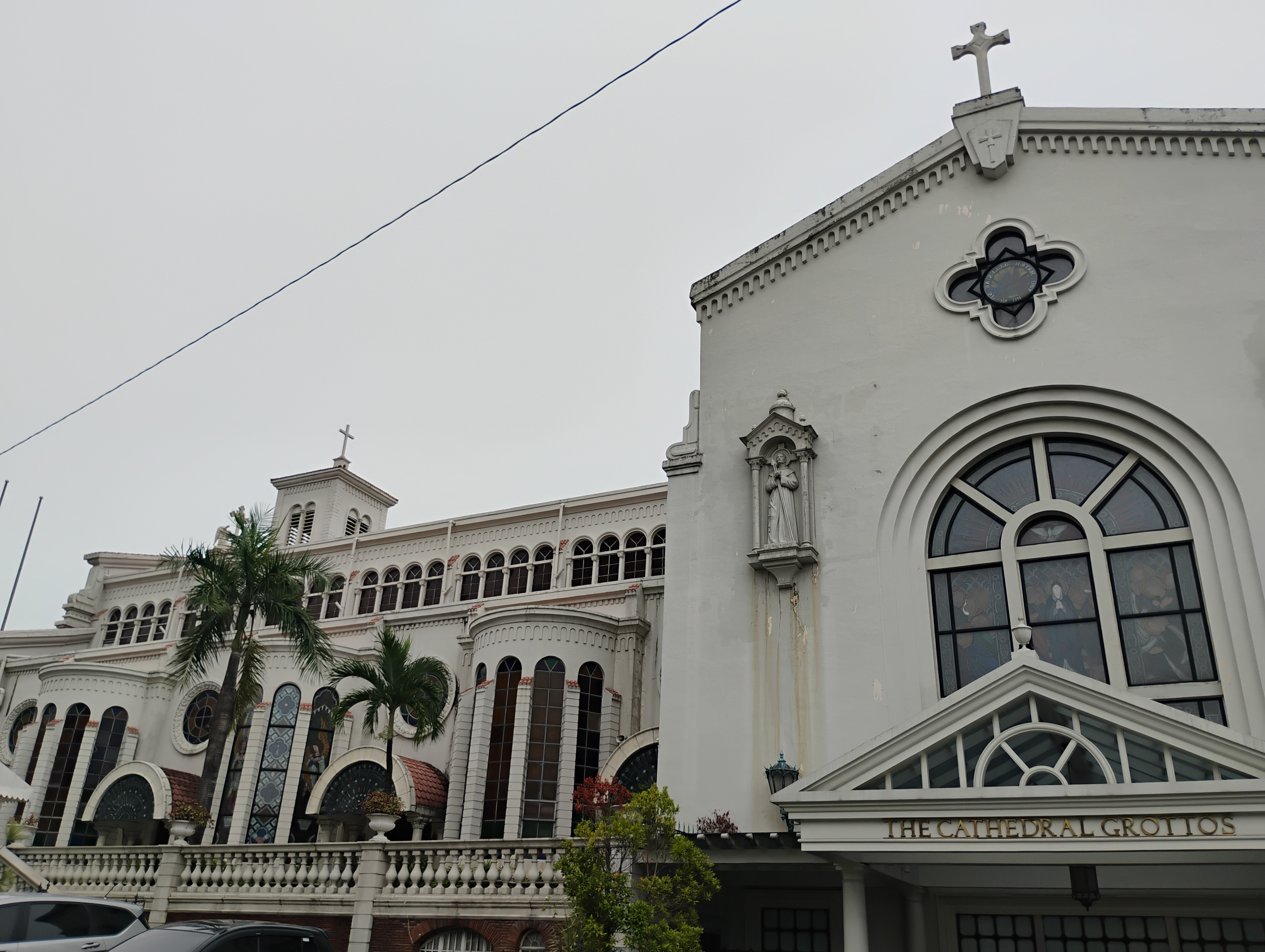
The north side of the cathedral's nave

Below is a list of parish priests, and upon the church's elevation to cathedral in 2003, rectors.

=== Society of the Divine Word administration ===
- Juan Simón (1950–1954)
- Alois Vogel (1955)
- Benito Rixner (1956–1958)
- Anselmo Bustos (1959–1962)
- José Lazo (1963)
- John Sleumer (1964)
- Francis Kutscher (1965–1970)
- George Harwardt (1971–1979)
- Liberato Fernandez (1980–1990)
- Chew Bing Ze (1980–1990)

=== Diocesan administration ===
- Reynaldo Y. Celso (1990–2000)
- Daniel B. Sta. María (2000–2006)
- Alfonso A. Bugaoan Jr. (2006–2009)
- Moises M. Cabrera (2009–2012)
- Ariston L. Sison Jr. (2012–2018)
- Dennis S. Soriano (2018–2024)
- Steven C. Zabala (2024–present)

== Gallery ==
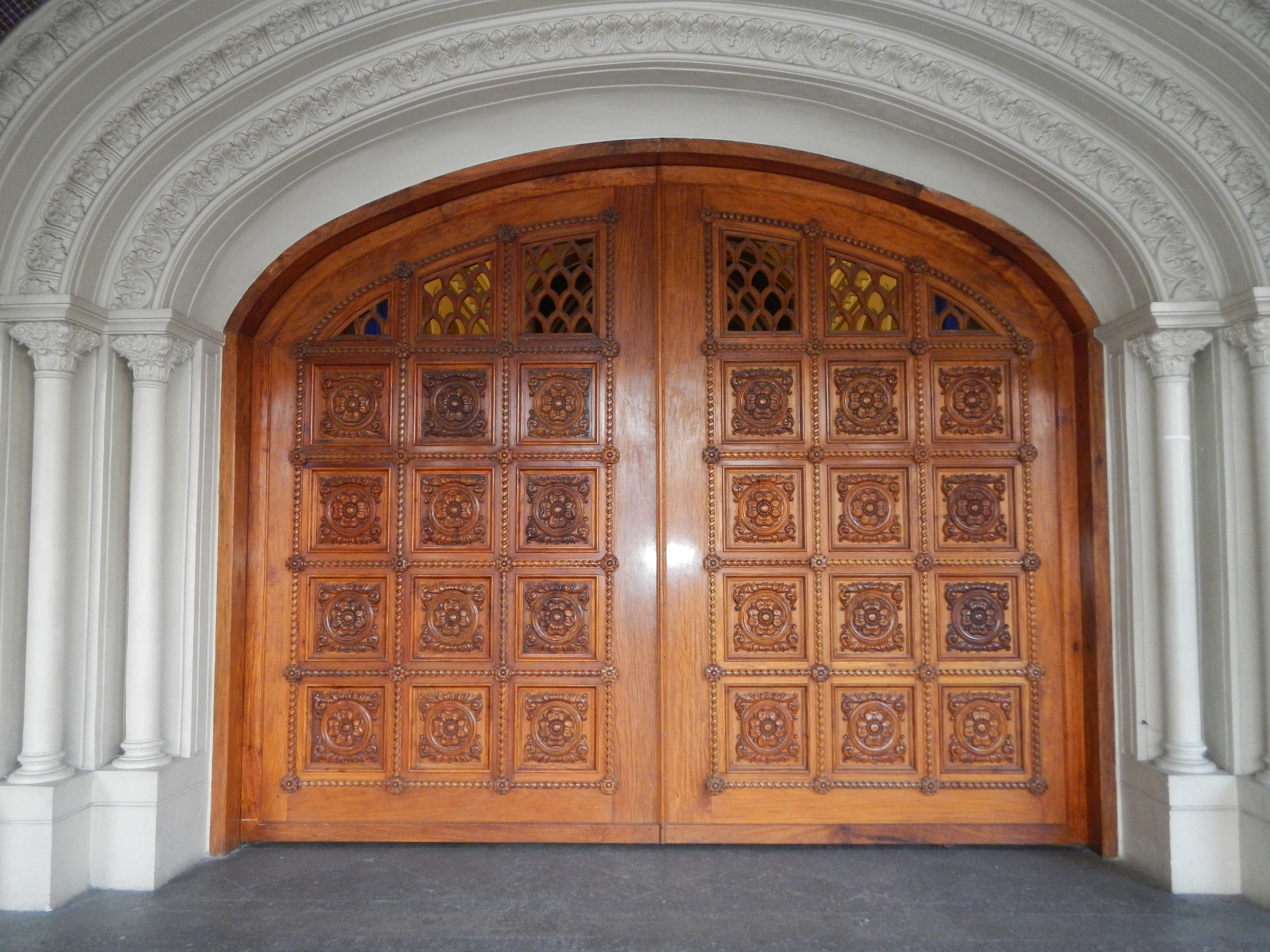
Church portal

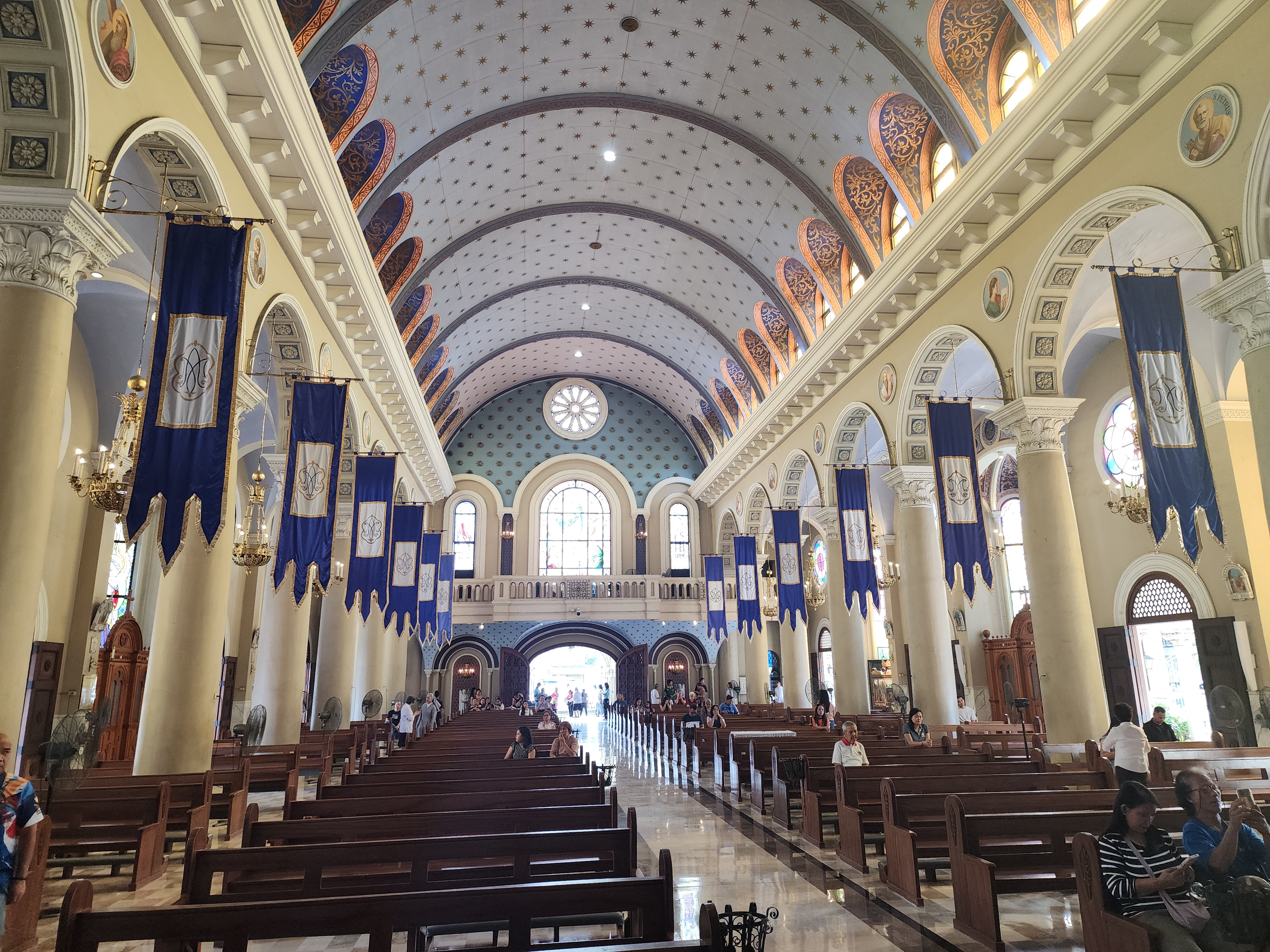
Church interior facing the choir loft. Note the arcade, clerestories, and rose window.

Stained glass window of the family of Mary, with Saints Anne and Joachim.

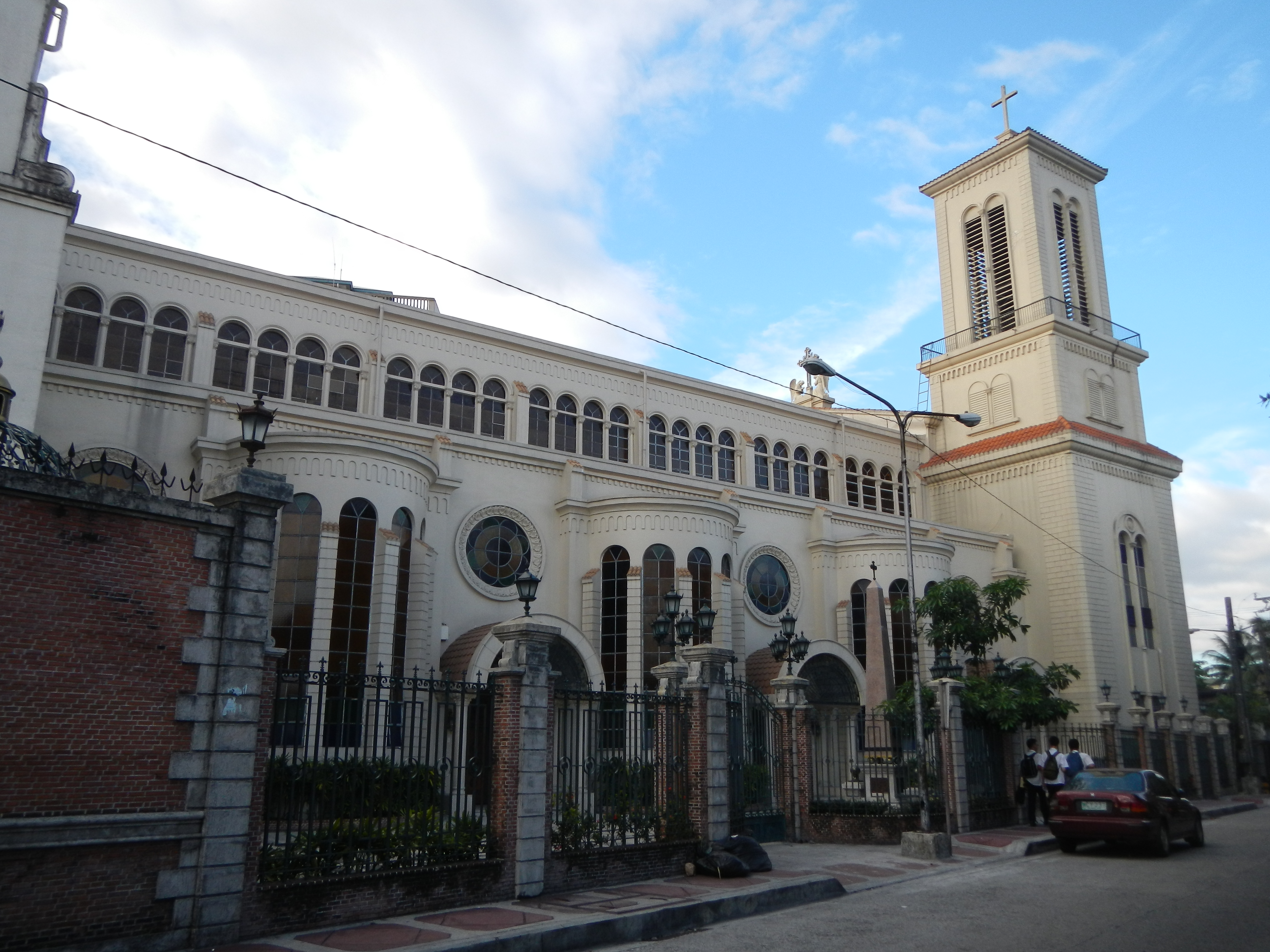
Left facade

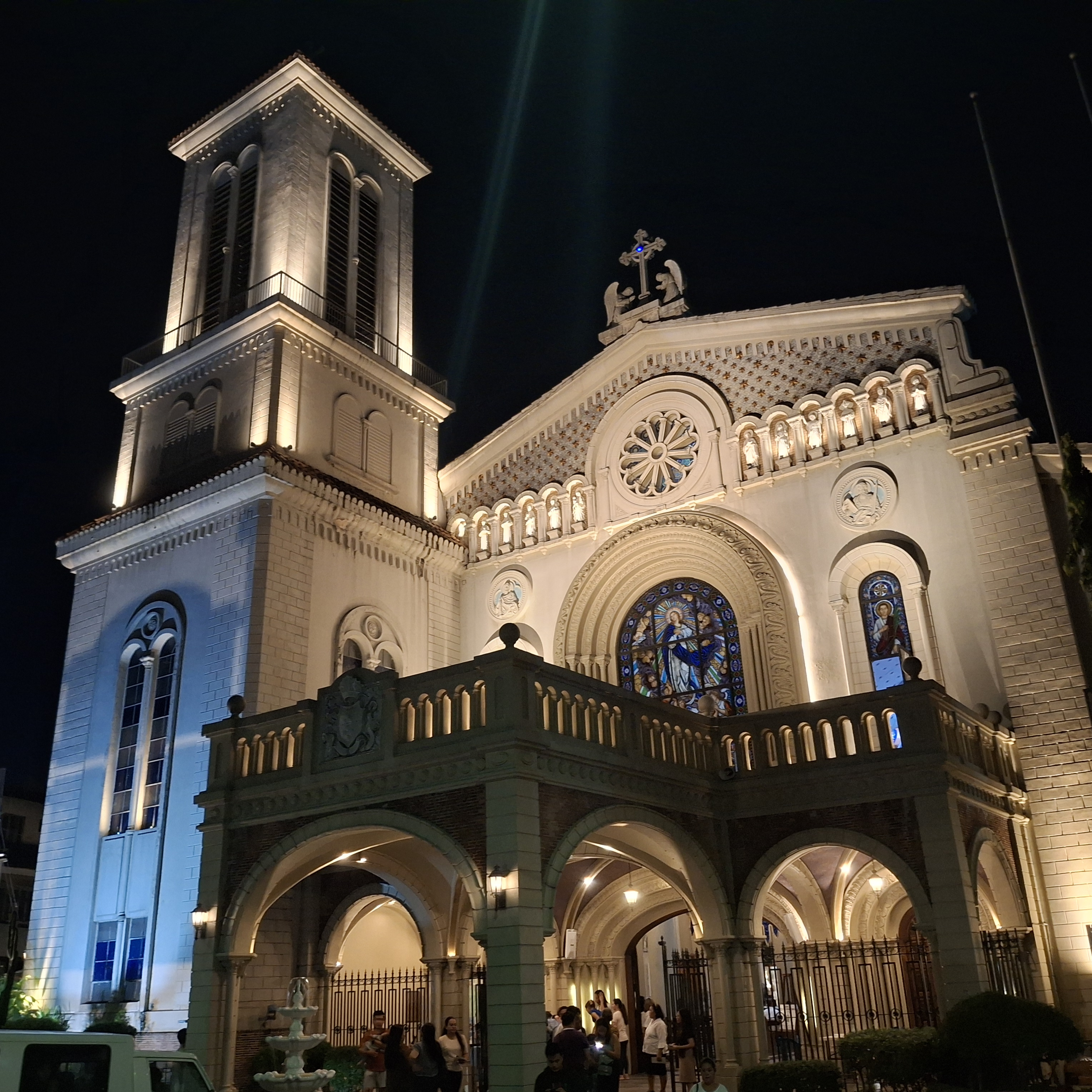
The Cathedral at Night

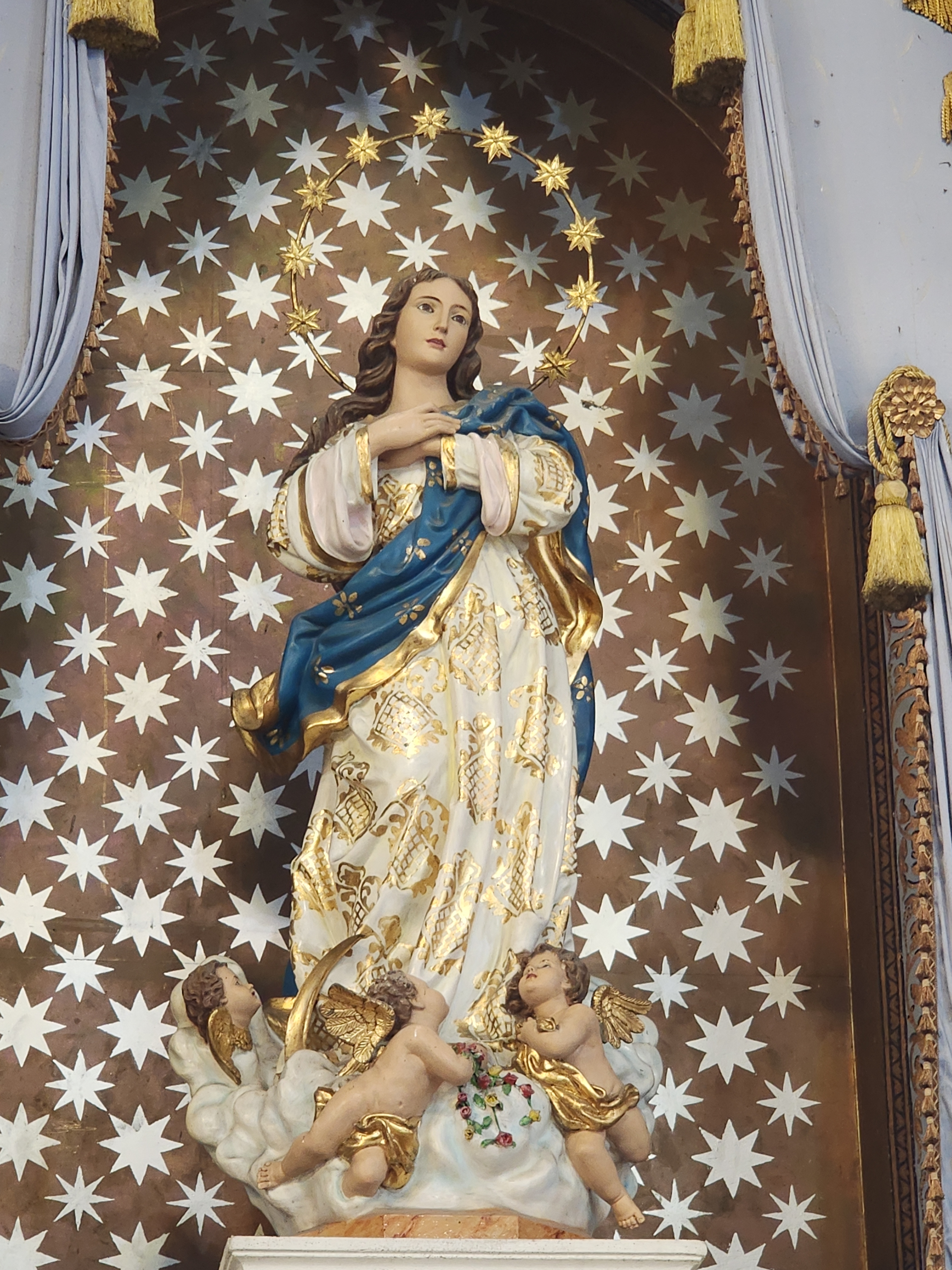
Altar of Our Lady of the Immaculate Conception

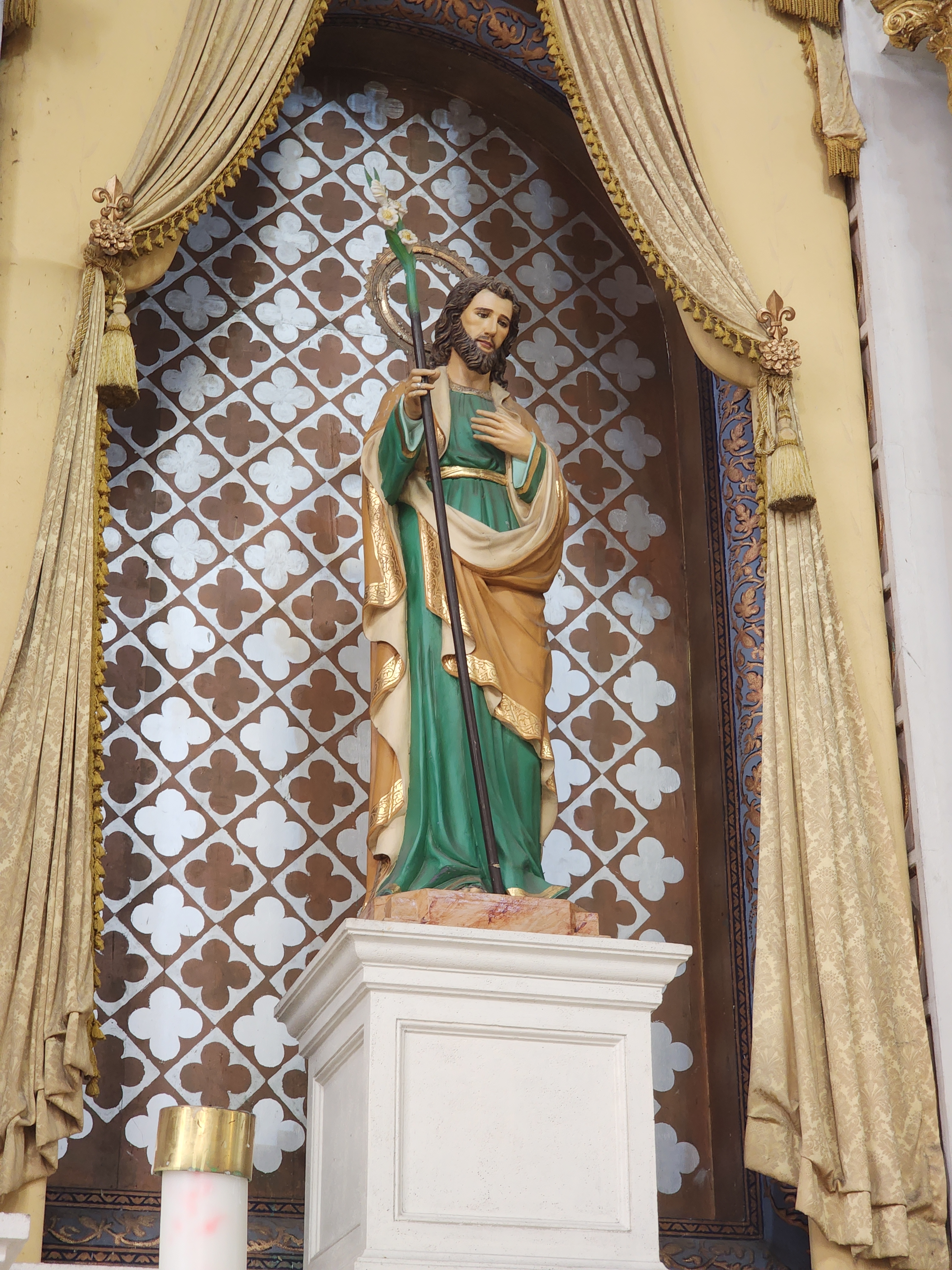
Altar of St. Joseph

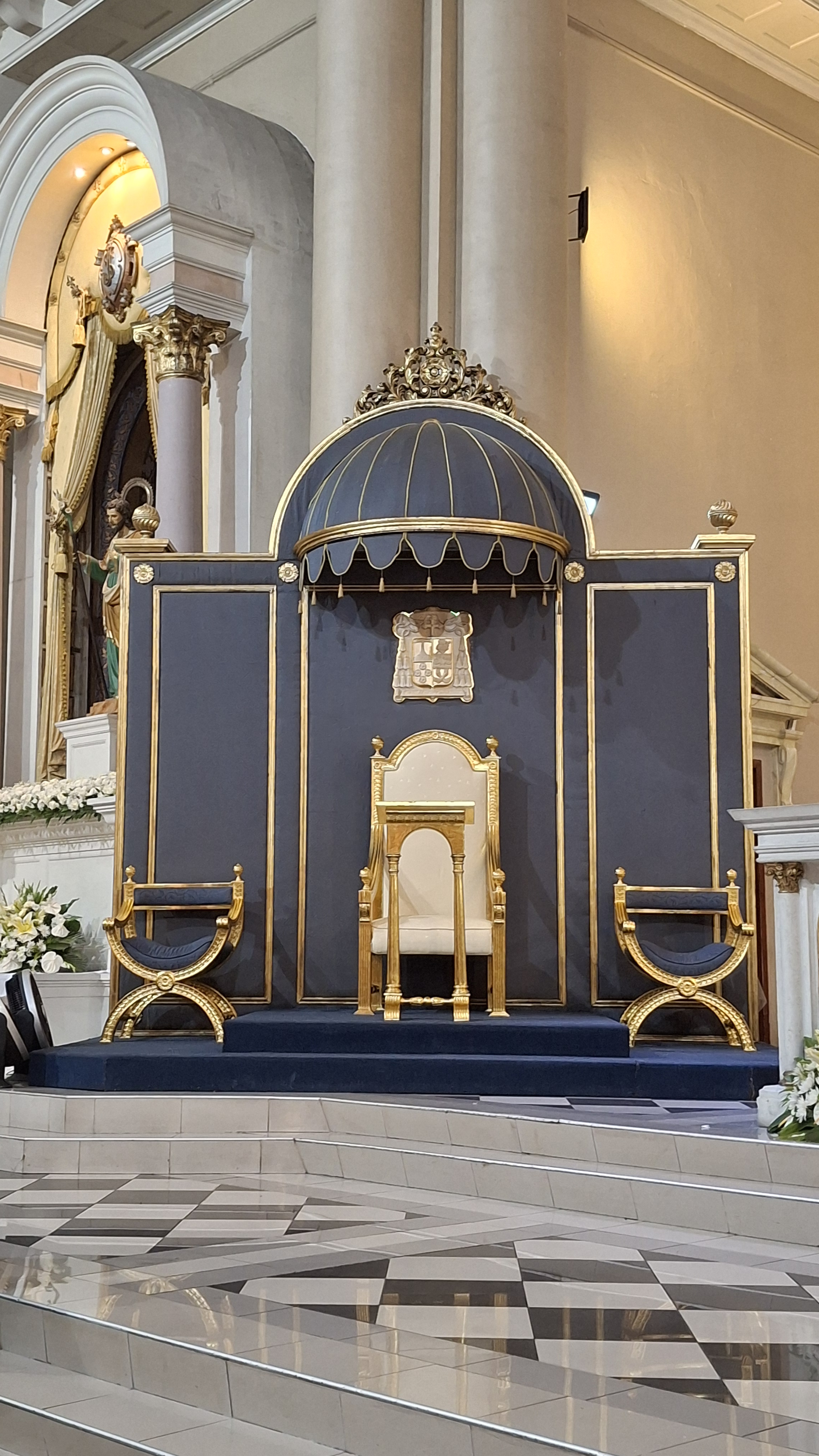
Cathedra
