= Diocese of Cubao =

Latin Catholic diocese in the Philippines

Coordinates: 14.6220°N 121.0435°E

Diocese of Cubao Dioecesis Cubaoënsis Diyosesis ng Cubao

Catholic
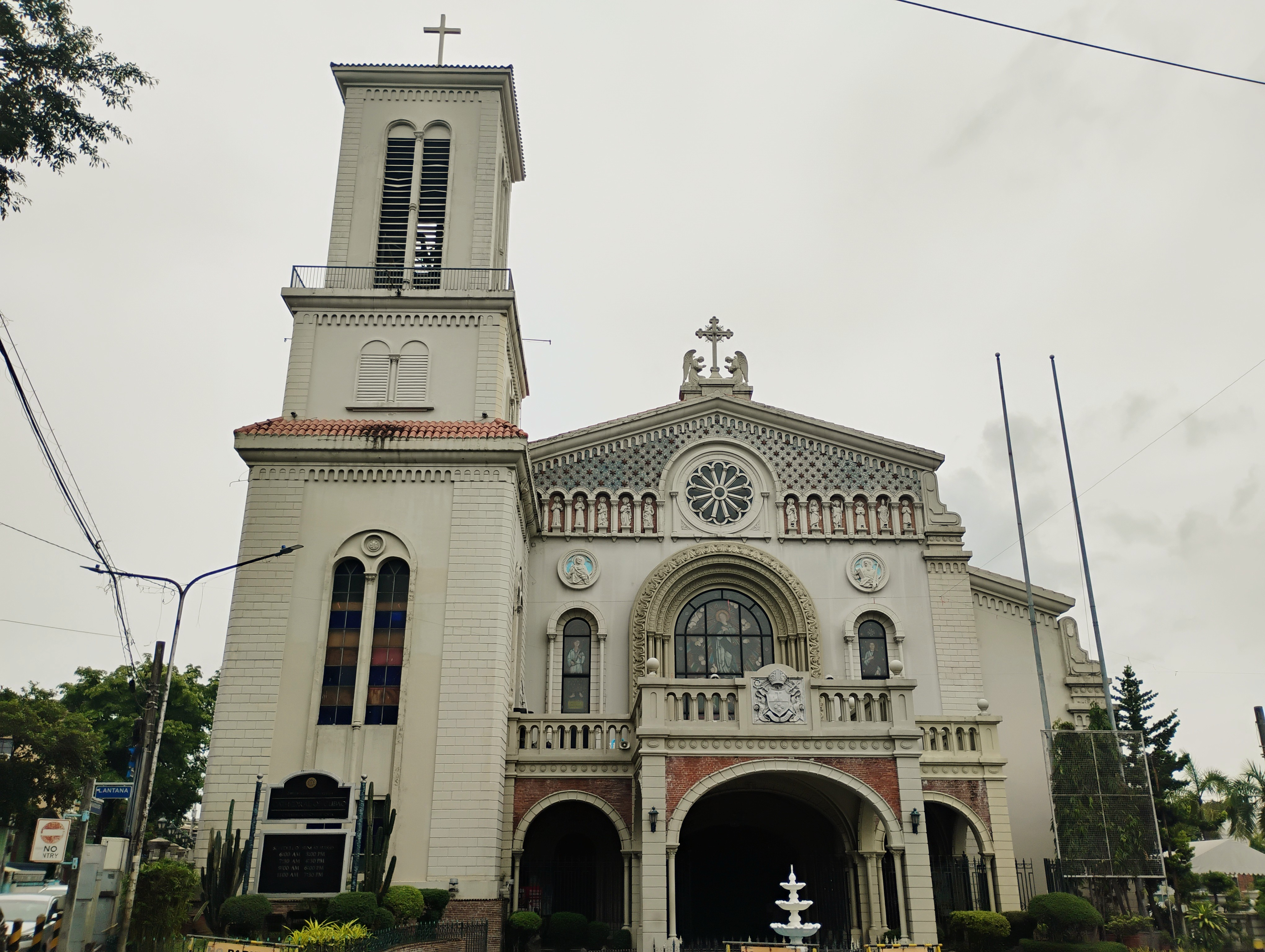
- Immaculate Conception Cathedral, seat of the diocese

- Coat of arms. The scroll reads, "Civitas supra montem posita" (Latin for 'A city set on a hill')

Location
- Country: Philippines
- Territory: Quezon City: District 1; District 3 (except Barangay Camp Aguinaldo, Matandang Balara, EDSA Shrine); District 4 (except the southern part of Bagong Lipunan ng Crame); District 6 (Apolonio Samson, Baesa, Balong Bato, New Era, Sangandaan, southern Culiat, southern Tandang Sora, Unang Sigaw)
- Ecclesiastical province: Manila
- Metropolitan: Manila

Statistics
- Area: 76 km^{2} (29 sq mi)
- Population: Total; Catholics: (as of 2021); 1,836,483; 1,468,829 (80%)
- Parishes: 46 parishes, 1 non-parochial shrine

Information
- Denomination: Catholic
- Sui iuris church: Latin Church
- Rite: Roman Rite
- Established: June 28, 2003; 23 years ago
- Cathedral: Immaculate Conception Cathedral of Cubao
- Patroness: Immaculate Conception
- Secular priests: 63

Current leadership
- Pope: Leo XIV
- Bishop: Elias Lumayog Ayuban Jr., C.M.F.
- Metropolitan Archbishop: Jose Advincula
- Vicar General: Fredrick Edward C. Simon
- Bishops emeritus: Honesto Flores Ongtioco

Website
- https://dioceseofcubao.ph

The Diocese of Cubao (Latin: Dioecesis Cubaoënsis) is a Latin Catholic diocese of the Catholic Church in district of Cubao in Quezon City, in northern Metro Manila, Philippines. The diocese was created by Pope John Paul II on June 28, 2003 from the ecclesiastical district of Cubao of the Roman Catholic Archdiocese of Manila. It was canonically erected on August 28, 2003, with the installation of Honesto Ongtioco as the first bishop of Cubao. The Blessed Virgin Mary, under the title Immaculate Conception, is the principal patroness of the diocese.

The diocese is composed of 45 full parishes including three national shrines, two minor basilicas; two quasi-parishes; one non-parochial diocesan shrine; and one mission station. These are clustered into six separate vicariates.

== History ==
On December 3, 1974, Manila Archbishop Jaime Sin divided Quezon City into four vicariates: the Vicariates of Santa Rita, of Holy Family, of Saint Joseph, and of Santo Nino.

On August 10, 1987, the ecclesiastical district of Quezon City was divided into two: Quezon City-North and Quezon City-South. On March 15, 2002, the district's territories were revised and the southern district renamed the ecclesiastical district of Cubao. Manila Auxiliary Bishop Socrates Villegas became the district bishop with Monsignor Daniel Santa Maria as its episcopal vicar.

On June 28, 2003, Pope John Paul II signed the papal bull Quo Satius Provideretur and the district was made a diocese, along with the Roman Catholic Diocese of Kalookan and Roman Catholic Diocese of Pasig. Honesto F. Ongtioco, Bishop of the Roman Catholic Diocese of Balanga, was named its first bishop and was formally installed on August 28, 2003. The Immaculate Conception Parish at 39 Lantana Street, Barangay Immaculate Conception, Cubao, Quezon City, became the Cubao Cathedral and seat of the diocese.

== Territorial jurisdiction ==
The diocese comprises the southern part of Quezon City, starting from Tandang Sora Avenue and Mactan Street leading throughout the south of the city, particularly the three legislative districts of the city in the south: District 1 (all barangays), District 3 (except Barangays Camp Aguinaldo, Matandang Balara and EDSA Shrine in Brgy. Ugong Norte along EDSA-Ortigas), and District 4 (except the lower part of Barangay Bagong Lipunan ng Crame). In addition to, it comprises some barangays in District 6, namely Sangandaan, Baesa, Apolonio Samson, Unang Sigaw, Balon-bato (or Balumbato), New Era, and portions of Culiat and Tandang Sora that are found on the southern portion across Tandang Sora Avenue.

Two properties owned and operated by the Archdiocese of Manila which are Radio Veritas 846 and Our Lady of Veritas Chapel, headquarters of Philippine religious congregations Claretian Missionaries (CMF), Dominican Order (Order of Preachers (OP)) Society of Jesus (SJ), Order of Friars Minor (OFM), Order of Augustinian Recollects (OAR), Religious of the Virgin Mary (RVM) Missionary Society of St. Paul (MSSP) and Missionaries of the Sacred Heart (MSC), government-owned media assets such as PTV-4 and PBS-BBS (under Radyo Pilipinas (Radyo Pilipinas - Radyo Publiko, Radyo Pilipinas - Sports and Radyo Pilipinas - Magasin) and PBS FM (Republika ni Juan and The Capital) brands), and headquarters of media companies and broadcasting networks, such as ABS-CBN Corporation, GMA Network, Inc. and their namesake media networks (ELJ Communications Center and GMA Network Center), are located within the diocese's jurisdiction.

Camp Aguinaldo and the portion of Camp Crame south of Bonny Serrano Avenue, with Veterans Memorial Medical Center along North Avenue, Project 6, are under the jurisdiction of the Military Ordinariate of the Philippines, whereas Barangay Matandang Balara and EDSA Shrine are under the Diocese of Novaliches and Archdiocese of Manila, respectively.

== Ordinaries ==
Bishop		Period in office	Notes	Coat of Arms
1	Honesto Flores Ongtioco	August 28, 2003 – December 3, 2024 (21 years, 97 days)	Retired, served as second Bishop of Balanga in Bataan from June 18, 1998 to August 28, 2003 prior to transfer to Cubao and Apostolic Administrator (Temporary Bishop) of Malolos from May 16, 2018 to August 21, 2019.	
2	Elias Lumayog Ayuban Jr., CMF	December 3, 2024 – present (1 year, 320 days)	Chairman of the CBCP – Episcopal Commission on Mutual Relations Between Bishops and Consecrated Persons Apostolic Administrator of Parañaque (Since June 6, 2026)	

=== Priests of the diocese who became bishops ===
- Mylo Hubert Vergara – appointed Bishop of San Jose, Nueva Ecija (2005–2011) and then Bishop of Pasig (2011–present)

== Vicariates and Parishes ==
The Diocese of Cubao consists of 48 parishes and quasi-parishes.

=== Vicariate of the Holy Family ===
1. The Immaculate Conception Cathedral of Cubao
2. Minor Basilica of the National Shrine of Our Lady of Mount Carmel
3. Diocesan Shrine of Jesus the Divine Word, Christ the King Mission Seminary
4. Sacred Heart Parish-Shrine
5. Holy Family Parish-Roxas
6. Most Holy Redeemer Parish, Brixton Hill
7. Saint Paul the Apostle Parish
8. Santo Niño de Vialogo Quasi-Parish
9. Our Lady of Fatima Parish

=== Vicariate of Our Lady of Perpetual Help ===
1. Our Lady of Perpetual Help Parish
2. Christ the King Parish-Greenmeadows
3. Nativity of Our Lord Parish
4. Our Lady of the Miraculous Medal Parish
5. Saint John Paul II Parish, Eastwood City
6. San Roque Parish
7. Transfiguration of Our Lord Parish

=== Vicariate of Saint Joseph ===
1. Saint Joseph Shrine
2. Holy Cross Parish, Krus na Ligas
3. Parish of the Lord of Divine Mercy
4. Holy Family Parish-Kamias
5. Immaculate Heart of Mary Parish, Diliman
6. Our Lady of Pentecost Parish
7. Parish of the Holy Sacrifice (UP Diliman)
8. Santa Maria della Strada Parish
9. San Isidro Labrador Parish

=== Vicariate of San Pedro Bautista ===
1. Basilica Minore de San Pedro Bautista
2. National Shrine of Our Lady of the Most Holy Rosary, La Naval de Manila, Santo Domingo Parish
3. National Shrine of Our Lady of Lourdes
4. Most Holy Redeemer Parish-Masambong
5. Saint Joseph the Worker Parish, Balintawak Cloverleaf
6. Saints Perpetua and Felicity Parish
7. Santa Teresita del Niño Jesus Parish
8. Immaculate Conception Parish-Damar Village

=== Vicariate of Santa Rita ===
1. Santa Rita de Cascia Parish, Philam, Quezon City
2. Christ the King Parish, Project 7
3. Hearts of Jesus and Mary Parish
4. Resurrection of Our Lord Parish
5. San Antonio de Padua Parish
6. Santo Cristo de Bungad Parish
7. Saint Jude Thaddeus Quasi-Parish

=== Vicariate of Santo Niño ===
1. Diocesan Shrine of Santo Niño Parish, Barangay Bago Bantay
2. Holy Family Parish-GSIS Village
3. Immaculate Conception Parish-GSIS Village
4. Our Lady of Hope Parish
5. Our Lady of Mount Carmel Parish, Project 6
6. Our Lady of Perpetual Help Parish, Project 8
7. Parish of Mary the Immaculate Conception
8. San Nicolas de Tolentino Parish Church

== Arms ==
Coat of arms of Diocese of Cubao

Notes
The arms of the Diocese of Cubao consists of:
Crest
Elaborately decorated heraldic Western mitre.
Escutcheon
Party per fess, in chief Or (gold) issuant from a mound of three coupeaux Vert (green) a Tau cross Tenné (brown); in base Azure (blue) four roses Argent (silver) arranged in lozenge.
Motto
Civitas Supra Montem Posita (English: A City Set on a Hill)

== See also ==
- Catholic Church in the Philippines
