= Intramuros Grand Marian Procession =

Religious procession in the Philippines

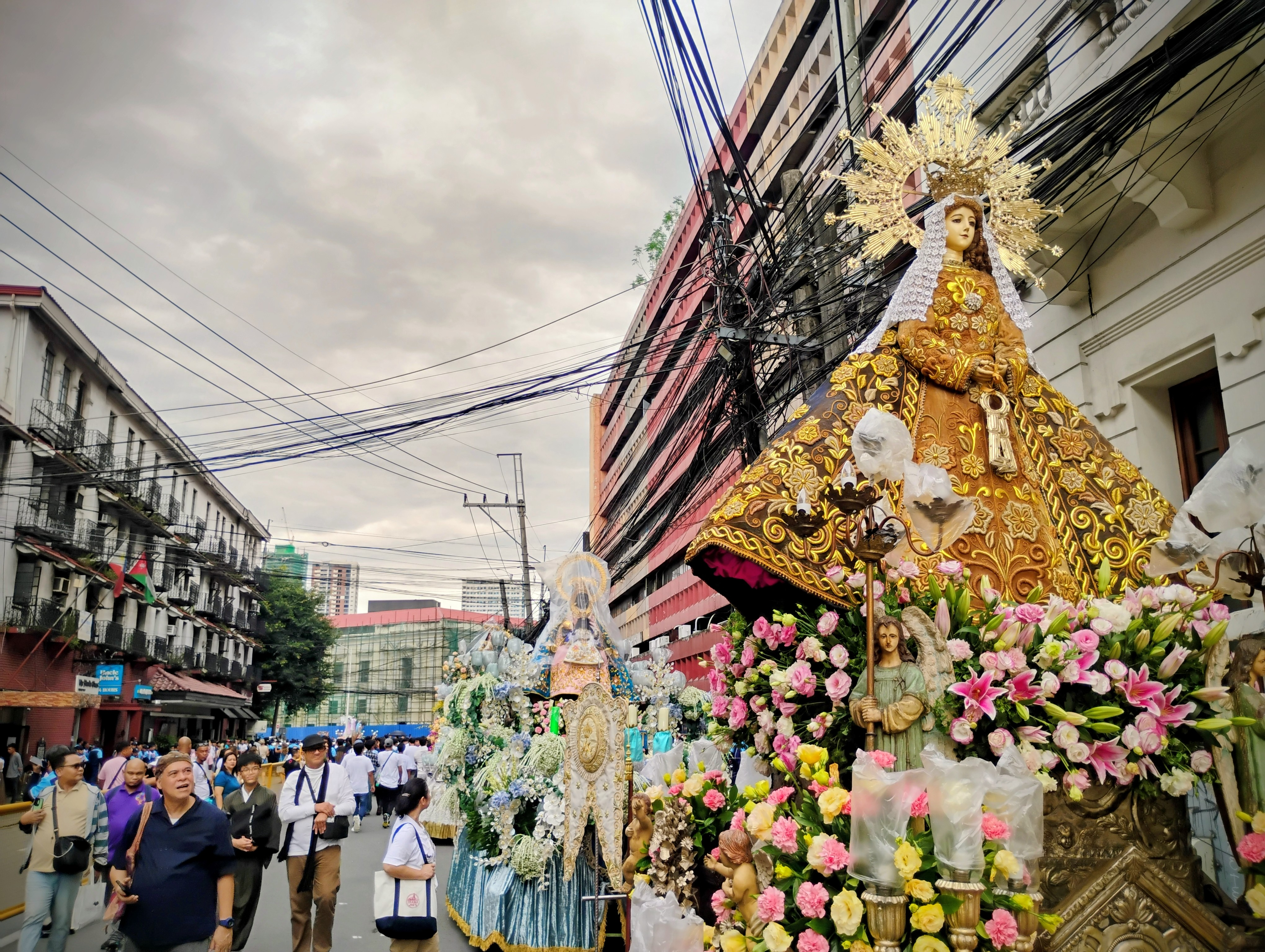
- The procession in 2025
- Also called: IGMP
- Observed by: Intramuros, Manila
- Liturgical color: White, Gold and Blue
- Type: Cultural, Catholic
- Significance: In honor to the Blessed Virgin Mary, Preparation for the feast of the Immaculate Conception and Gathering of all canonical and episcopal crown Marian images and icons throughout the Philippines
- Celebrations: Holy Mass; Processions
- Observances: Sending prayer cards, estampas, religious gifts and church services
- Date: First Sunday in December
- 2024 date: December 1
- 2025 date: December 7
- 2026 date: December 6
- 2027 date: December 5
- Frequency: Annual
- First time: 1981; 44 years ago
- Related to: Feast of the Immaculate Conception

The Intramuros Grand Marian Procession commonly known as IGMP is an annual religious procession that takes place in honor of the Feast of the Immaculate Conception. This event takes place every First Sunday of December at the Plaza de Roma at the facade of the Manila Cathedral in Intramuros, Manila. This event is organized by the Cofradia de la Immaculada Concepcion and the Intramuros Administration. This procession is the largest and grandest of its kind in the country. Over 100 images of the Blessed Virgin Mary participate every year which comes from different parishes and families from all over the country. Some of the images include La Naval de Manila; Our Lady of Porta Vaga of Cavite City; Our Lady of the Pillar of Imus; Divine Shepherdess of Gapan, Nueva Ecija; Morning Star of Taytay, Rizal; Our Lady of Caysasay of Batangas; Our Lady of Peace and Good Voyage of Antipolo; Our Lady of the Abandoned of Marikina; Our Lady of Aranzazu of San Mateo, Rizal; Our Lady of Light of Cainta, Rizal; Our Lady of the Most Holy Rosary of Cardona, Rizal; and Nuestra Señora de los Dolores de Turumba of Pakil, Laguna.

== History ==
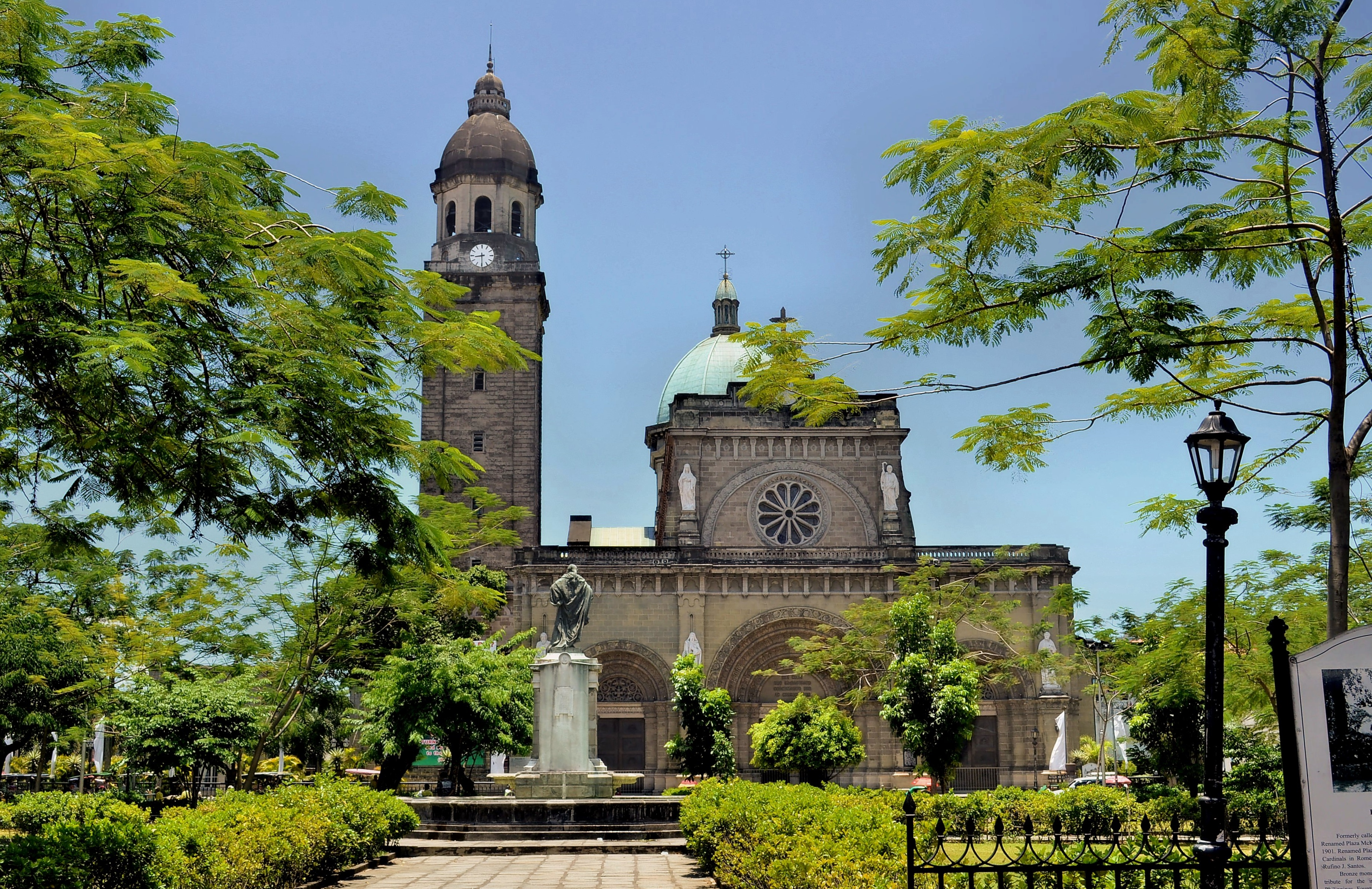
The Manila Cathedral, where the procession is held annually

The procession is a revival of the tradition that originated on December 8, 1619, in Intramuros. It was then a national celebration that ran for fifteen days, launched at the Manila Cathedral.

After the Second World War, Intramuros was destroyed. While the Intramuros Administration, the governing body of the Manila district, restored the Walled City, they also needed to restore some traditions that were held before the war. One of the most successful attempts was the revival of the procession of the Blessed Virgin Mary. Since 1981, the procession has been organized by the Intramuros Administration and the Cofradia de la Immaculada Concepcion.

No processions were held in 2020 and 2021 due to the COVID-19 pandemic in the Philippines. The procession returned on December 4, 2022, after a two-year hiatus.
