= Our Lady of Turumba =

Marian image and Patroness of Pakil, Laguna

Our Lady of Sorrows of Turumba Nuestra Señora de los Dolores de Turumba Mahal na Ina ng Hapis ng Turumba
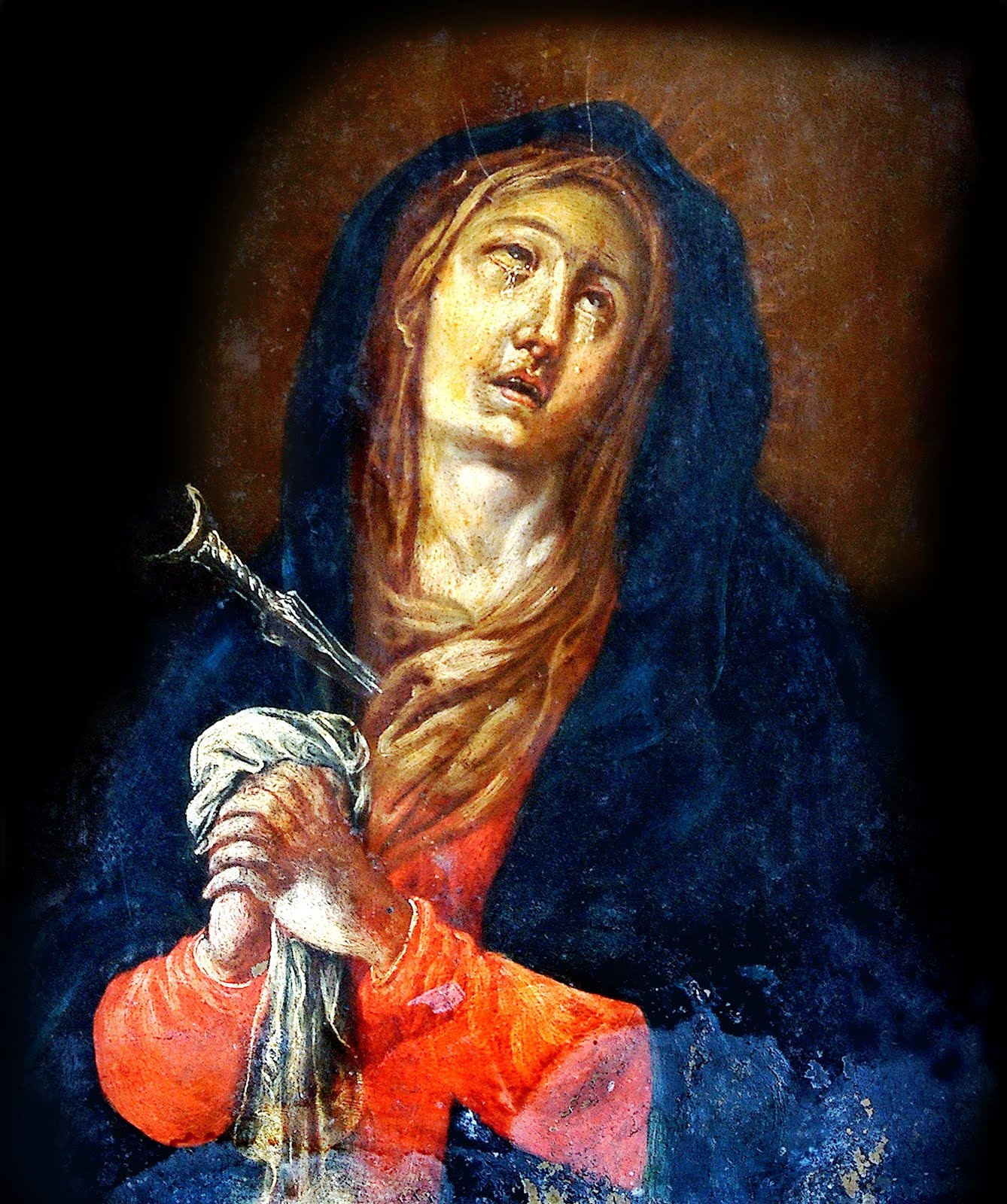
- The original icon
- Location: Pakil, Laguna, Philippines
- Date: 1788
- Witness: Fishermen
- Type: Wood statue and Oil painting
- Approval: 24 May 2021 by Pope Francis
- Venerated in: Catholic Church
- Shrine: Diocesan Shrine of Our Lady of Sorrows of Turumba, Saint Peter of Alcántara Parish, Pakil, Laguna, Philippines
- Patronage: Pakil, Laguna; Laguna de Bay
- Attributes: in mournful state, tears, white handkerchief in her hand and pierced by a dagger in her Immaculate heart

Our Lady of Sorrows of Turumba (Spanish: Nuestra Señora de los Dolores de Turumba; Tagalog: Mahal na Ina ng Hapis ng Turumba) is a Marian title, a venerated Marian icon and image associated to the Our Lady of Sorrows, The town of Pakil in the province of Laguna considers her as its patroness.

== Etymology ==
The word turumba is alleged to be from the Tagalog phrase “Natumbá sa lakí ng tuwâ” (English: "Had trembled in great joy"). The first turumba in the icon's honour was held on September 14, 1788.

== Description ==
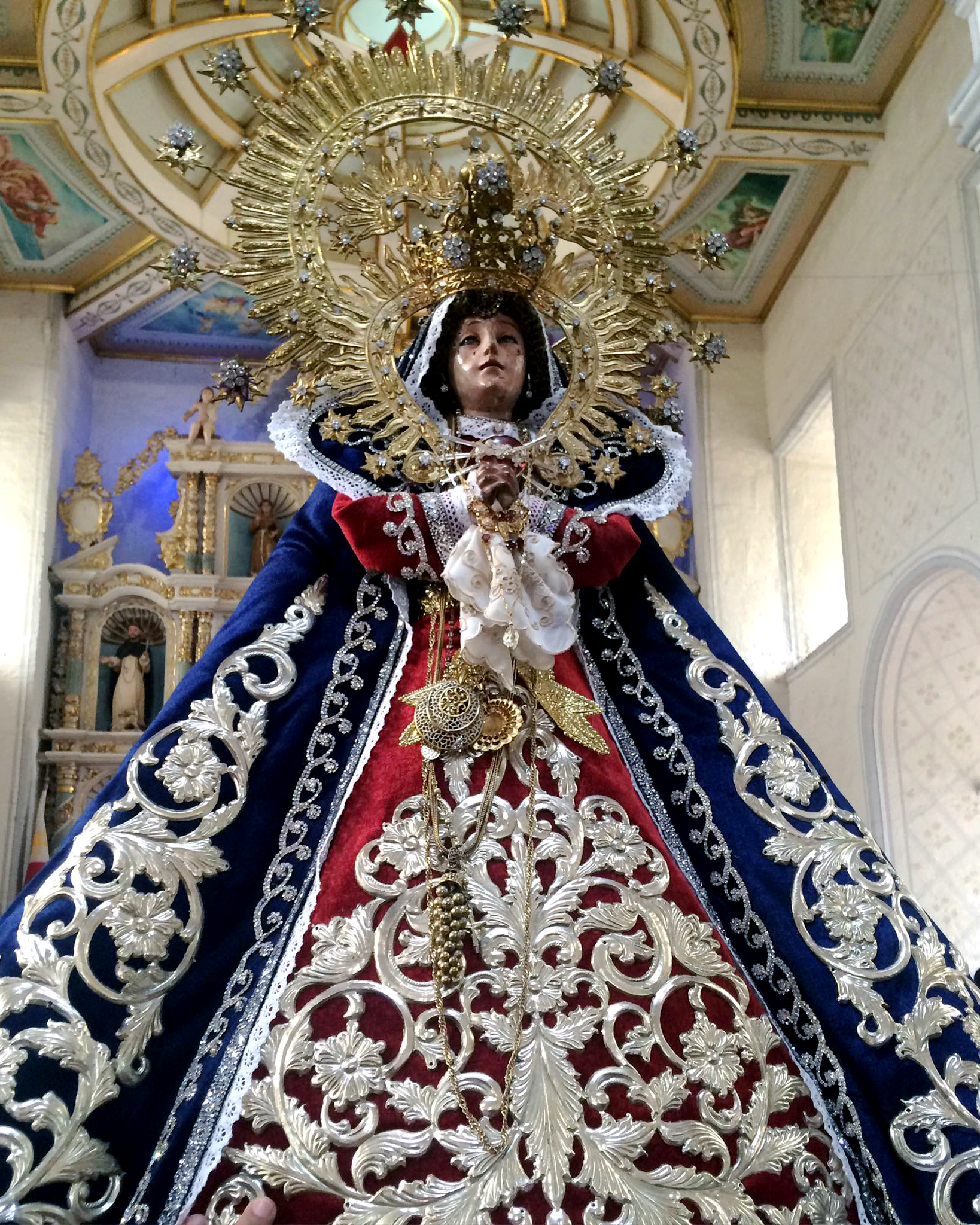
The second image of Our Lady of Turumba brought from Spain venerated inside the church. This particular image was bestowed an episcopal coronation in 1953.

The icon of Our Lady is a 9 by 11 inches (23 by 28 cm) oil painting on canvas. The face of Mary is contorted by pain from the dagger plunged into her heart, which Simeon has prophesied in Luke 2 at the Presentation of Jesus.

The icon is presently enshrined at the Saint Peter of Alcantara Parish Church in Pakil. The second image of the Virgin Mary as Our Lady of Sorrows is an in-the-round replica of the image of Nuestra Señora de la Antigua, Siete Dolores y Compasión from Spain.

== History ==
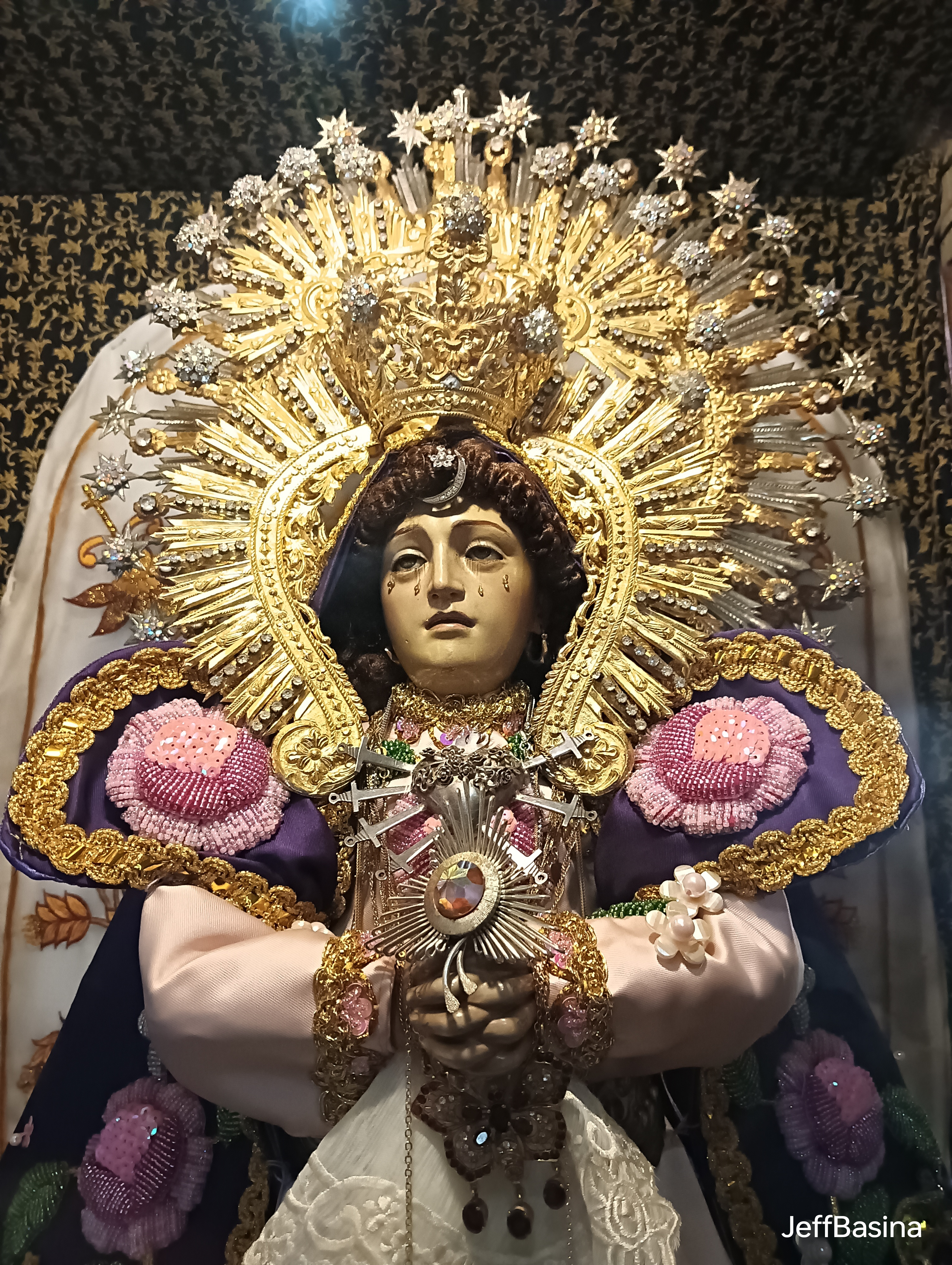
First replica of Our Lady of Sorrows of Turumba

The image, according to tradition, belonged to some missionaries who crossed Laguna de Bay in a launch. When the launch was shipwrecked, some of its relics were washed ashore including the icon of the Virgin.

One Friday morning, some fishermen found the icon in their nets. Believing it to be a religious image, they decided to bring it to a parish church. When the men carried the small painting, they found it too heavy. They tried sailing in directions with the icon until they brought it to the shore near Pakil Church. When headed that way, the wind and current aided their course. Upon landing, they left the heavy image on a rock so that they could continue fishing.

A group of women found the icon the following Sunday morning. Although it had rained during the night, the canvas was miraculously dry. When they tried to take the icon away, they could not move it; even the strongest among them, Mariangga, could not lift it. They quickly told the parish priest, who in turn called the sacristans, choristers, and churchgoers at Mass to fetch the image. As they lifted the icon, it gave way. The townsfolk around began to sing and dance, giving birth to the turumba.

The original Antiguas statue was episcopally crowned by the Bishop of Lipa, Alejandro Olalia y Ayson on 24 May 1953.

On July 30, 2016, the venerated image was declared by the Diocese of San Pablo as the “Mother and Patroness of Laguna Lake” and the “Patroness of Laguna’s Environmental Stewardship”.

== Lupi Feasts ==
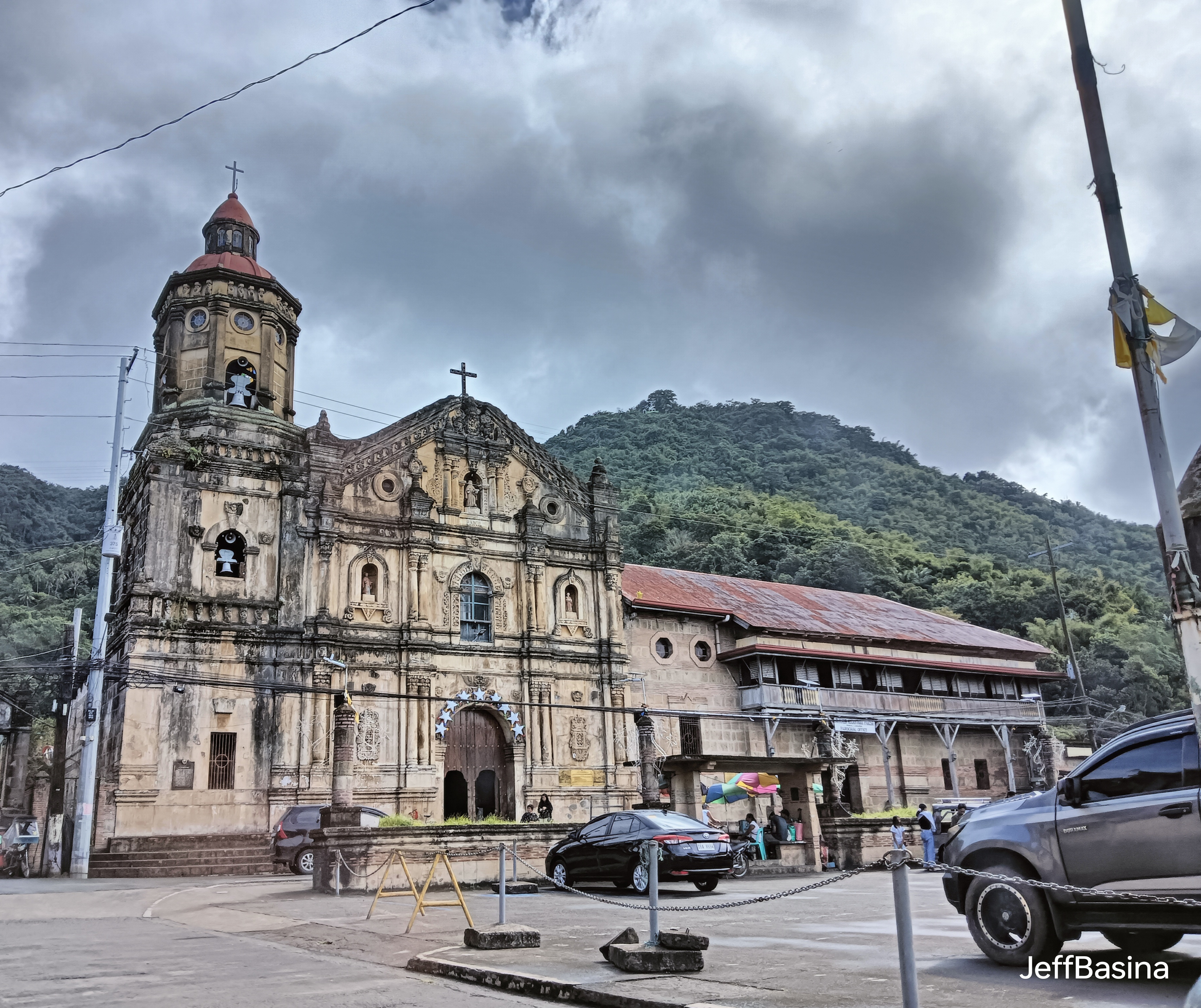
Church of St. Peter of Alcantara in Pakil, Laguna, where the image is enshrined

The Seven days of Sorrows are known to the Philippines as Lupi fiestas:

- 1st Lupi or "Biernes Dolores" falls on the Friday preceding Palm Sunday
- 2nd Lupi or "Pistang Martes" falls on Easter Tuesday
- 3rd Lupi or "Pistang Biyatiko" falls on the 2nd Wednesday after Easter Sunday
- 4th Lupi or "Pistang Biyernes" falls on the 3rd Friday after Easter Sunday
- 5th Lupi or "Pistang Linggo" falls on the 4th Sunday after Easter Sunday
- 6th Lupi after the Feast of the Ascension falls on the 5th Sunday after Easter
- 7th Lupi falls on Pentecost

Due to multitude of pilgrims and devotees, especially from nearby municipalities and provinces, four Lupi fiestas were added.

- "Fiesta Pakilena" falls every May 12 to commemorate the foundation of town of Pakil from the town of Paete in 1676. As it falls in the Lupi period, there's no separate novena.
- "Piyestang Inang Matulungin" usually falls on the Saturday before June 27 which is the feast of Our Mother of Perpetual Help if no other Lupi fiestas are observed for that month.
- "Piyestang Lagunense" or "Pistang Lagwenyos" usually falls on the Saturday before July 16 which is the feast of Our Lady of Mount Carmel. It is on July 28 when the Province of Laguna was created and on July 30, 2016, when the Our Lady of Sorrows of Turumba was proclaimed as patroness, Mother of Laguna Lake and "Patroness of Laguna's Environmental Stewardship".
- "Piyestang Pag-uugnay" or "Piyestang Pag-aakyat" usually falls every August 5, which is the Dedication of the Papal Basilica of Saint Mary Major (Basilica di Santa Maria Maggiore) in Rome, Italy. St. Peter of Alcantara Parish Church, the Diocesan Shrine of Our Lady of Sorrows of Turumba, was granted the Spiritual Bond of Affinity from the said Papal Basilica. The other name of the feast refers to the Feast of the Transfiguration held the day after.

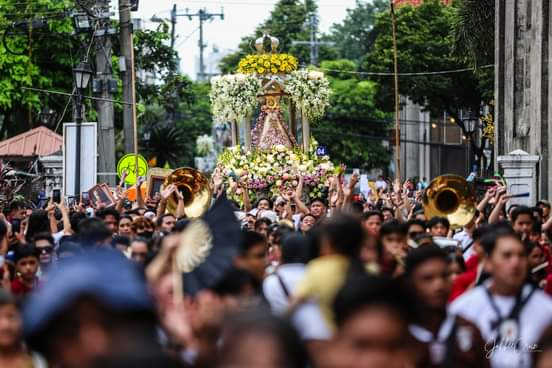
The original Antiguas image participating in the annual Intramuros Grand Marian Procession

The image is also brought out in procession on October 19, the town fiesta of Pakil. On the Sunday nearest September 15, the Catholic Church in the Philippines celebrates the feast of the discovery of the image, and alongside one final novena, a replicas procession is marked to celebrate the anniversary.

Homage to the Virgin of Sorrows is done by the way of song and dance, drumbeat and shill cries of its devotees of Sa Birhen that the people regard as co-sharing with Mary's grief during the Passion of Christ. The turumba Novena periods are called lupi ("meaning to fold"), because at the closing of every festivities, the novena booklet is folded to mark the pause in preparation for the next Lupi on the mass of the feast, which is followed by the usual procession as the congregration sings the anthem Turumba sa Birhen.

Old dresses of the Virgin are customarily shredded and given to pilgrims as tokens. It was said that when the piece of cloth from the Virgin is kept close to a person, it grants miraculous powers and protects against personal injury, accidents, fire, and calamities.

The statue is enshrined at the retablo in the main altar, The image is usually dressed in violet as a sign of sorrow for Christ's passion (the liturgical color of Lent). The original icon found in the waters is enshrined in a separate retablo around bas reliefs of her Seven Sorrows in a chapel inside the church.

The image is a participant in the Intramuros Grand Marian Procession and its delegation has the largest number of devotees accompanying it during the procession.

== Pontifical coronation ==
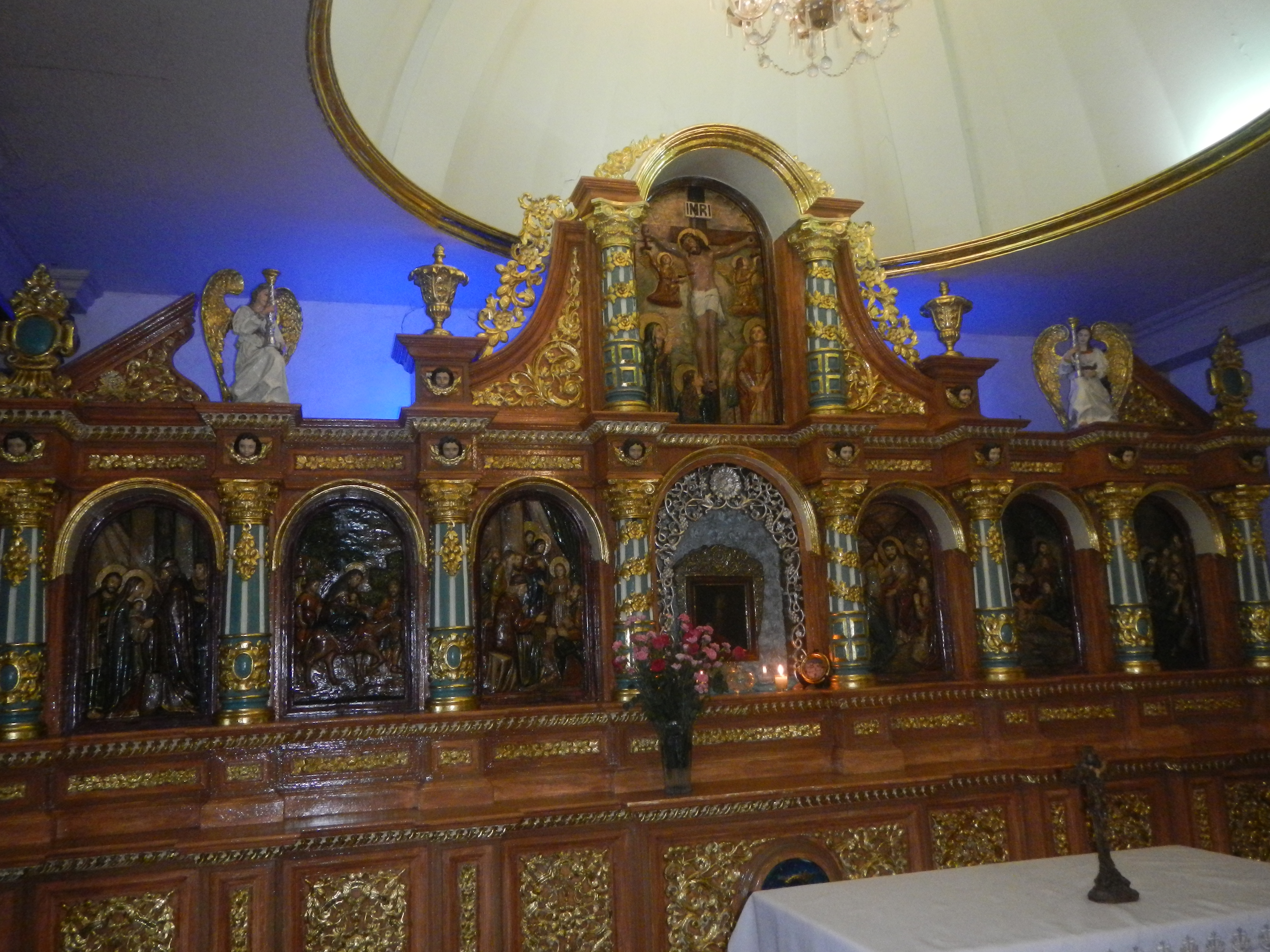
The chapel enshrining the original icon in the central niche of the reredos. The surrounding bas reliefs depict the Seven Sorrows of Mary.

Pope Francis granted a decree of canonical coronation specifically for the painted framed image on 24 May 2021. Due to necessary church works and restoration, the coronation would only be scheduled in 2023. Several activities are planned to celebrate the coronation starting from September 15 to 24. The original icon was canonically crowned by Archbishop Charles John Brown, Apostolic nuncio to the Philippines, on 15 September 2023, the Feast of Our Lady of Sorrows.

As closing remarks of the coronation events, the original statue was solemnly crowned (Note: According to the statement released by the Roman Catholic Diocese of San Pablo on 17 September 2023, both coronation celebrations are rather connected with each other, not as two separate rites. However, this would most likely be a symbolical coronation, considering a decree from the Holy See only grants one particular image for such an honor.) on 24 September 2023 at the Saint Paul the First Hermit Cathedral in San Pablo, Laguna with a Mass presided by the emeritus Bishop of Novaliches, Antonio Realubin Tobias. The commemorative act also marked the 70th anniversary of its episcopal coronation.

== See also ==
- List of canonically crowned images
