= Peter of Alcántara =

Christian saint

Saint Peter of Alcántara OFM
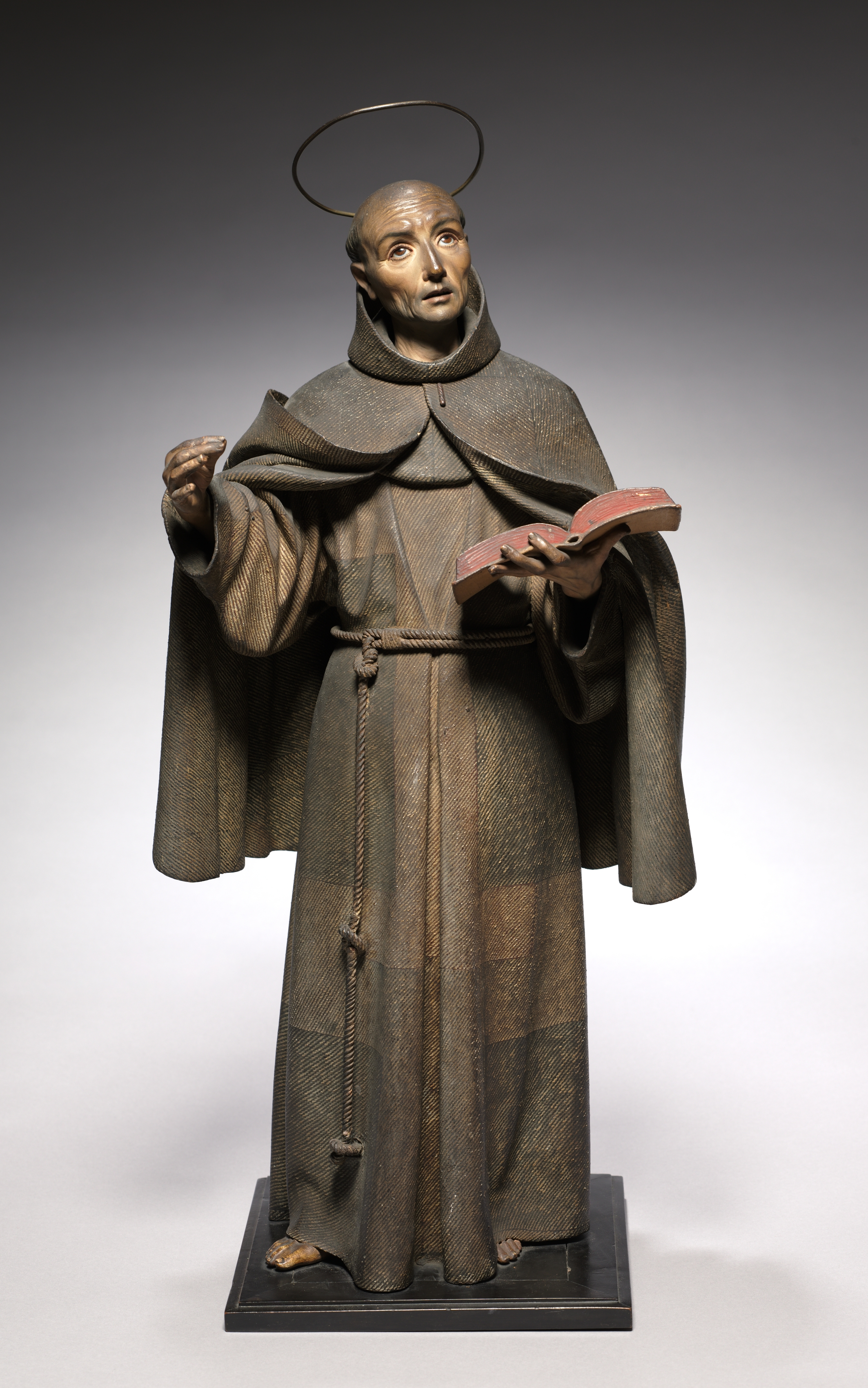
- Saint Peter of Alcántara, painted wood sculpture by Pedro de Mena (1628)

Friar, Mystic, Confessor
- Born: 1499; Alcántara, Spain
- Died: 18 October, 1562 (aged 62-63); Arenas de San Pedro, Spain
- Venerated in: Roman Catholic Church
- Beatified: April 18, 1622 by Pope Gregory XV
- Canonized: April 28, 1669 by Pope Clement IX
- Feast: October 19
- Attributes: Franciscan habit
- Patronage: Brazil, Eucharistic adoration, Extremadura, Pakil, Shrewsbury Cathedral

Peter of Alcántara, OFM (born Peter Garavita; Spanish: Pedro de Alcántara; 1499 – October 18, 1562) was a Spanish Franciscan friar who was canonized in 1669.

== Biography ==
Peter was born at Alcántara, Province of Cáceres, Extremadura, Spain. His father, Peter Garavita, was the governor of Alcántara, and his mother was of the noble family of Sanbia. He decided to join the Franciscans at the age of 16 shortly after he was sent to university in Salamanca by his stepfather.

Returning home, he became a Franciscan friar of the Stricter Observance in the friary at Manxaretes, Extremadura, in 1515. At the age of 22 he was sent to found a new community of the Stricter Observance at Badajoz. He was ordained a priest in 1524, and the following year was appointed Guardian of the friary of St. Mary of the Angels at Robredillo, Old Castile. A few years later he began preaching with much success. He preferred to preach to the poor; his sermons, taken largely from the Prophets and Sapiential Books, breathe the tenderest human sympathy. At the time Peter entered the Order, the reform of the "Discalced Friars" consisted of the Custody of the friaries in Spain and Santa Maria Pietatis in Portugal, all subject to the Minister General of the Observants.

In 1538 Peter was made minister provincial of the Franciscan Province of St. Gabriel of Estremadura but resigned when his plans to enforce severe rules among the friars were opposed, and he retired with St. John of Avila into the mountains of Arrábida in Portugal, where he joined Friar Martim de Santa Maria in a life of eremitical solitude. Soon, though, other friars came to join him, and several little communities were established. Peter was chosen guardian and master of novices at the friary of Palhais, Barreiro. In 1560 these communities were erected into the Province of Arrábida.

Returning to Spain in 1553 he spent two more years in solitude; then he journeyed barefoot to Rome and obtained permission of Pope Julius III to found some poor friaries in Spain under the jurisdiction of the Minister General of the Conventuals. Friaries were established at Pedrosa, Plasencia, and elsewhere; in 1556 they were made a commissariat, with Peter as commissary, and in 1561 a religious province under the title of St. Joseph. Not discouraged by the opposition and ill-success his efforts at reform had met with in St. Gabriel Province, Peter drafted the constitutions of the new province with even greater severity. The reform spread rapidly into other provinces of Spain and Portugal.

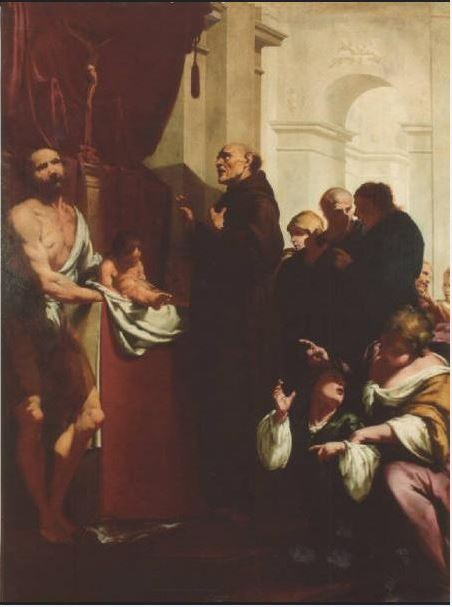
The Miracle of Saint Peter of Alcantara by Giovanni Battista Lucini

In 1562 the Province of St. Joseph was placed under the jurisdiction of the Minister General of the Observants, and two new custodies were formed: St. John the Baptist in Valencia and St. Simon in Galicia (see Friars Minor). Francis Borgia once wrote to him that "your remarkable success is a special comfort to me."

In St. Teresa of Ávila Peter perceived a soul chosen by God for a great work, and her success in the reform of Carmel (see Discalced Carmelites) was in great measure due to his counsel, encouragement, and advocacy. It was a letter from Peter, dated April 14, 1562, that encouraged her to found her first monastery in Avila, Spain on August 24 of that year. The autobiography of St. Teresa is the source of much of the extant information on Peter's life, work, gift of miracles, and prophecy. According to St. Teresa, it was very common for him to eat only once in three days, and sometimes he would pass a week without eating.

He was a man of remarkable austerity and poverty who travelled throughout Spain preaching the Gospel to the poor. He wrote a Treatise on Prayer and Meditation, which was considered a masterpiece by St. Teresa, St. Francis de Sales, and Ven. Louis of Granada.

While in prayer and contemplation, he was often seen in ecstasies and levitation. On his deathbed, he was offered a glass of water which he refused, saying that "even my Lord Jesus Christ thirsted on the Cross". He died while on his knees in prayer on October 18, 1562 in a monastery at Arenas (now Arenas de San Pedro, Province of Ávila, Old Castile, Spain).

== Veneration ==
It is also said that Peter slept very little and that he always slept sitting up. Because he was awake most of the time when his brother friars were sleeping, he is the patron saint of night watchmen.

== Legacy ==
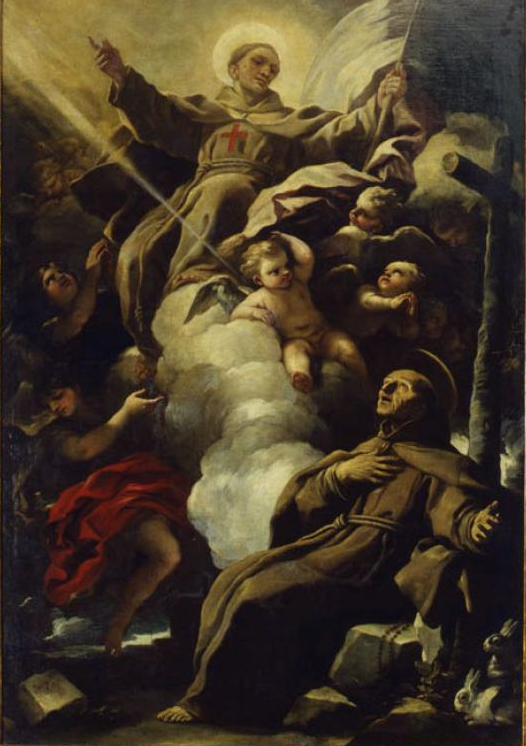
The apparition of Saint John of Capistrano to Saint Peter of Alcantara by Luca Giordano

Peter of Alcantara was beatified in Rome by Pope Gregory XV on April 18, 1622, and canonized by Pope Clement IX on April 28, 1669.

In 1670, Peter of Alcantara's feast day was set as October 19, the day after his death, as October 18 is the feast of Saint Luke the Evangelist in the Roman Calendar. The 1969 revision of the calendar removed his feast from the general calendar, limiting its celebration to places or communities for which he is especially significant (or which continue to follow the older calendar).

Peter of Alcantara is the patron saint of nocturnal adoration of the Blessed Sacrament. In 1826, he was named patron saint of Brazil, and in 1962 (the fourth centenary of his death), of the Spanish region of Extremadura. He is also venerated as patron saint of various parishes in the United States and the Philippines. The town of San Pedro de Alcántara in the province of Málaga is named after him.

== See also ==
- Diocese of Shrewsbury Cathedral of Our Lady Help of Christians and St. Peter of Alcantara, United Kingdom
- St. Peter of Alcantara Cathedral, Brazil
- Saint Peter of Alcantara Parish Church, Pakil, Laguna, Philippines
