= Investiture =

Formal installation of a candidate

Investiture (from the Latin preposition in and verb vestire, "dress" from vestis "robe") is a formal installation ceremony that a person undergoes, often to mark or celebrate their taking up membership in—or leadership of—a Christian religious institute, an order of chivalry (which may include knighthoods, damehoods, or other honours), or a governmental leadership role or office.

In an investiture, a person may receive (or be 'invested with') an outward symbol or marker of their membership, such as a religious habit (as with monastic communities), an ecclesiastical decoration (as with christian chivalric orders), a badge or medal (as with an honours investiture), a particular coloured veil (as with religious orders of women), or a scapular (as with confraternities). A person assuming political or clerical office (eg, as a bishop) may be given the symbols of authority or particular (usually historical) regalia of that office; these items often come to be regarded as manifestations of the polity or the religious order or institution itself, and are passed down from office-holder to their successor. Investiture can include formal dress and adornment, such as a robe of state, crown, or headdress; it often takes place in a particular space (a church or a parliament building etc) and other regalia such as a staff, sword, throne or sceptre may also play a role. An investiture is also often part of, or is similar to, a coronation rite or an episcopal enthronement.

== Christian organisations ==
Bishops are given jurisdiction over a particular part of a church during an investiture, which occurs alongside their consecration as a member of the order of bishops.

=== Religious institutes ===
Investiture indicates, in religious orders, the usually ceremonial handing over of the religious habit to a new novice. The investiture takes place either as part of a liturgical celebration (usually in a church or its choir) or in the community's chapter house.The investiture usually takes place upon admission to the novitiate (or, rarely, later, upon their simple or solemn profession).

In some places, a person entering a religious community's novitiate is invested with a slightly shorter or white habit: the junior member then dresses in this until their simple/solemn profession, at which time they exchange their prior garb for a full, regular habit as worn by other professed members of the community. In some religious orders for women, the white veil of the novice is exchanged for a black veil when taking temporary vows (simple profession), while other communities only give the black veil at solemn profession.

=== Confraternities ===
Joining a confraternity (such as the Confraternity of the Immaculate Conception) occurs through an investiture; in some of these ceremonies the new member is given a scapular as an outward totem or symbol of their membership.

=== Chivalry ===
A Christian is made a knight or dame through an investiture, as with the Order of Saint John (Bailiwick of Brandenburg), a chivalric order.

== Government ==
Investiture is the installation of individuals in institutions that usually have been extant from feudal times. For example, the installation of heads of state and various other state functions with ceremonial roles are invested with office. Usually, the investiture involves ceremonial transfer of the symbol of the gods. Judges in few countries, including justices of the Supreme Court of the United States, are invested with their office. American justices typically take two oaths: one to uphold the Constitution of the United States, and the other to apply justice equally. Likewise, university presidents, rectors and chancellors are invested with office.

In Spain, the prime minister and similarly, the leaders of regional governments, undergo an election procedure called "investiture" or "parliamentary investiture". Established in the Spanish Constitution, the procedure consists in the candidate to prime minister defending its political program and the legislative chamber supporting it or rejecting it. If accepted, the monarch appoints him as prime minister.

== Other uses ==
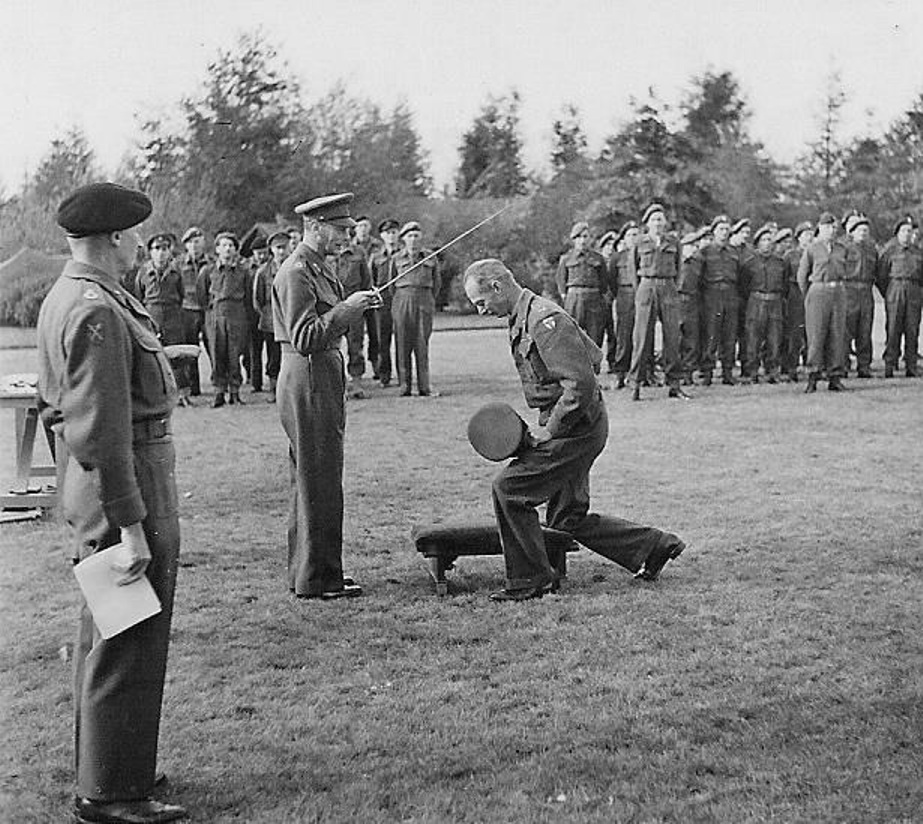
Lieutenant General Miles Dempsey is invested with his knighthood as Knight Commander of the Order of the Bath, in the field of battle, by King George VI on 15 October 1944, while Field Marshal Sir Bernard Montgomery looks on.

In the United Kingdom, around 2,600 people annually are invested with state honours or membership in chivalric orders, either personally by the reigning monarch (presently King Charles III) or another senior member of the royal family. A list of those to be honoured is published twice a year, in either the New Year Honours or the Birthday Honours. Approximately 25 investiture ceremonies are held annually, usually either in the Throne Room at Buckingham Palace or the Grand Reception Room in Windsor Castle. The Palace of Holyroodhouse, in Edinburgh, Scotland, is also used, as are other locations from time to time. In 2014, for example, the then-Prince of Wales held an investiture at Hillsborough Castle in Northern Ireland.

Investitures are also held in other Commonwealth realms, when the governor-general or lieutenant-governor acts on behalf of the relevant nation and the monarch to award and bestow upon certain citizens particular state honours or membership in orders of chivalry.

The term is used in the Scouting movement when enrolling a new youth member or an existing member is moving to a different section such as from Cubs to Scouts, and for the ceremony in which a new member declares their commitment to scouting traditions.

The poem "The Investiture" by English poet, writer, and soldier Siegfried Sassoon is about a young man who was killed in battle during World War I.

== See also ==
- Consecration of a bishop or of a church.
- Coronation and anointing, ceremonies similar to investitures signifying the assumption of royal office.
- Enthronement, a similar process, a term used to describe the ceremony at which one formally takes up royal or episcopal office.
- Investiture controversy of the Middle Ages between the church and state.
- Ordination.
