= Saint Peter of Alcantara Parish Church (Pakil) =

Roman Catholic church in Laguna, Philippines

Pakil Church
- Saint Peter of Alcantara Parish Church; Diocesan Shrine of Our Lady of Sorrows of Turumba
- Parokya ni San Pedro Alcantara (Filipino); Pang-Diyosesanong Dambana ng Mahal na Birhen ng Turumba (Filipino)
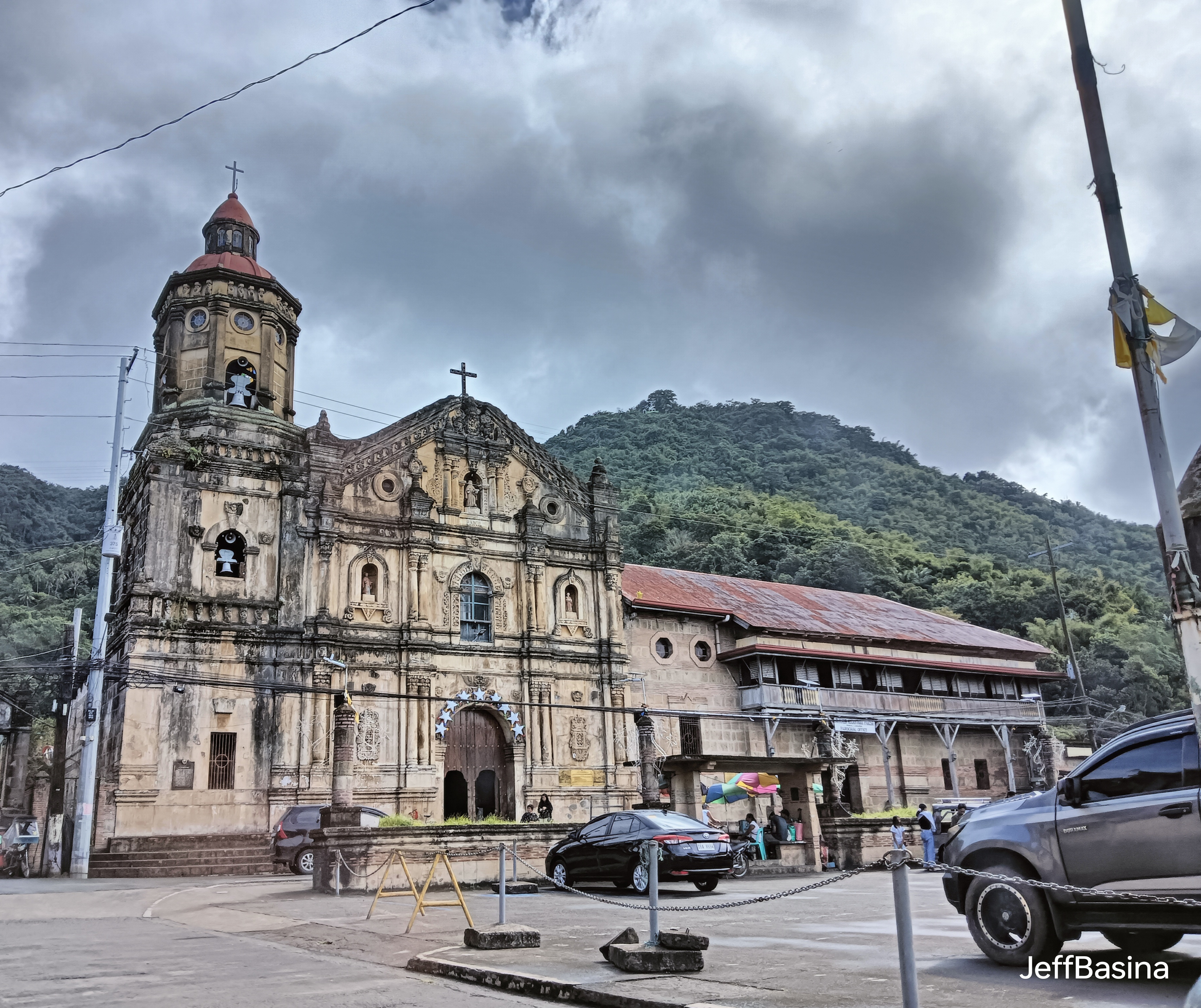
- Church facade in 2024

- Location in Laguna Location in Luzon Location in the Philippines
- 14°22′51″N 121°28′44″E
- Location: Pakil, Laguna
- Country: Philippines
- Denomination: Roman Catholic

History
- Status: Diocesan shrine and parish church
- Founded: 1676
- Founder: San Pedro Bautista
- Dedication: Peter of Alcántara
- Consecrated: 1581

Architecture
- Functional status: Active
- Architectural type: Church building
- Style: Corinthian and Ionic
- Groundbreaking: 1732
- Completed: 1767

Specifications
- Length: 162 ft (49 m)
- Width: 36 ft (11 m)
- Materials: Sand, gravel, cement, and bricks

Administration
- Province: Manila
- Metropolis: Manila
- Archdiocese: Manila
- Diocese: San Pablo
- Deanery: St. James

Clergy
- Rector: Jerry Oblepias

Saint Peter of Alcantara Parish Church, designated as the Diocesan Shrine of Nuestra Señora de los Dolores de Turumba, is a Roman Catholic church in Pakil, Laguna, Philippines. It is under the jurisdiction of the Diocese of San Pablo and enshrines the Our Lady of Turumba painting.

== History ==
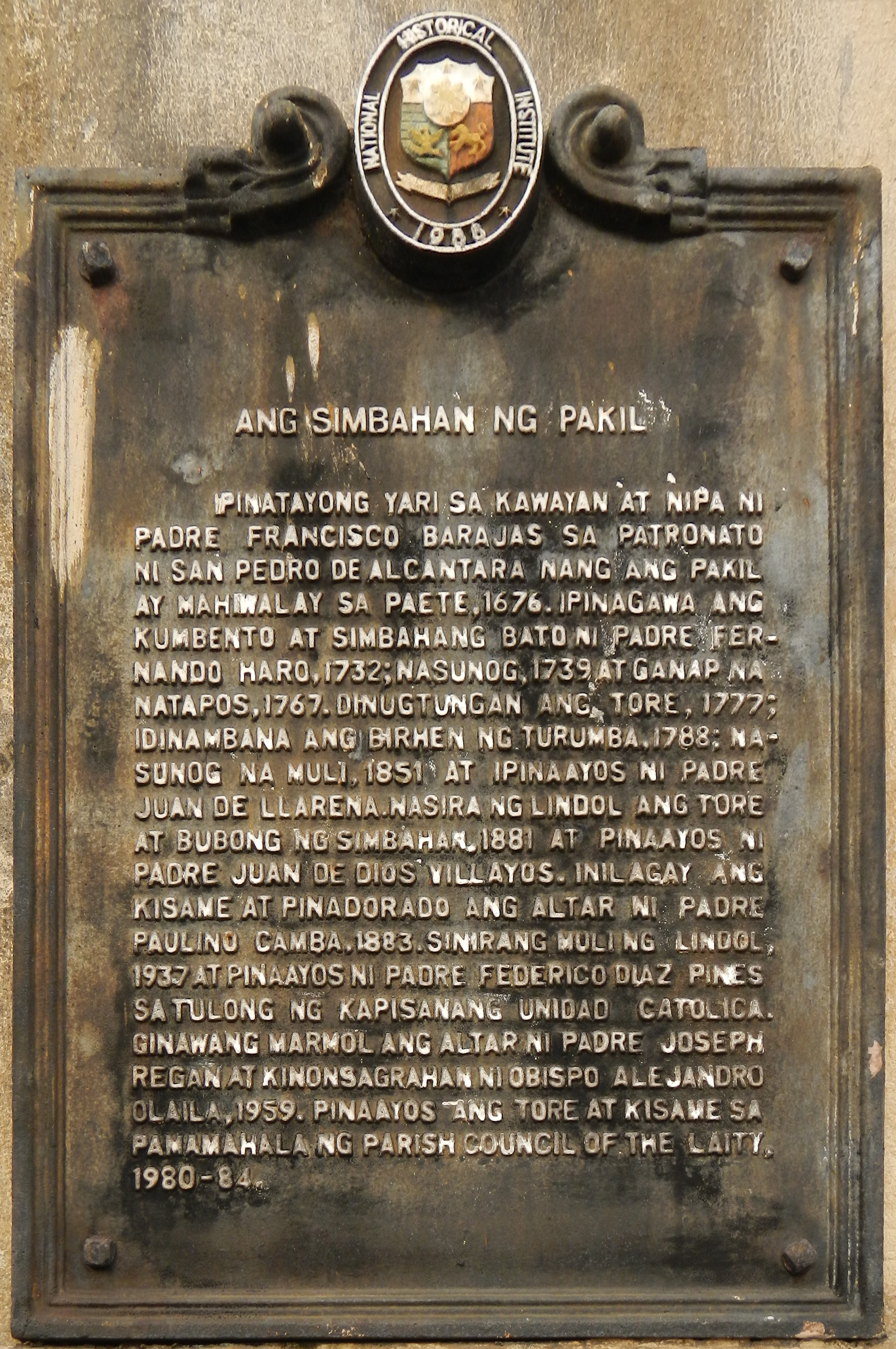
Church historical marker installed in 1988

The first Catholic community in Pakil was organized by Fray Pedro Bautista (later canonized as San Pedro de Bautista) as a visita of Paete in 1588. It was separated from Paete in 1676. Father Francisco de Barajas, a priest from Santa Ana de Sapa Church in Manila, was named as the first parish priest on May 12, 1676. The first church was constructed of bamboo, nipa and other light materials, by volunteers under the patronage of Peter of Alcantara.

In 1684, the government, through Governor General Gabriel Curuscalegui, approved the collection of a tribute for five years for the sole purpose of constructing a stone church. The foundation was laid in 1732 during the term of Father Fernando Haro, but it burned down in 1739. It was begun again, and the construction of the church finished in 1767 with the addition of a tower in 1777. The image of Our Lady of Turumba was unveiled in 1788. In 1840, Father Joaquin de Coria repaired the church, but because of a fire in 1851 which ravaged most of the town, Father Juan de Llanera fixed the damages to the church the following year. Father Juan de Dios de Villayos rebuilt the church roof and bell tower after it was damaged by an earthquake in 1881, and the church was rebuilt again in 1883 by Father Paulino Camba. Damaged by the earthquake of 1937, it was repaired again by Father Federico Diaz Pines with the help of the Confederation of United Catholics (Kapisanang Unidad Catolica). During World War II, the church suffered damage and was later renovated. A major repair was done from 1980 to 1984, when a story of the bell tower was rebuilt and the ceiling was renovated under the Parish Council of the Laity.

=== Affiliation with St. Mary Major in Rome ===
The Chancery of the Roman Catholic Diocese of San Pablo confirmed that the diocese received a letter from Santos Cardinal Abril, Archpriest of the Papal Basilica of St. Mary Major in Rome. The letter conferred a Spiritual Bond of Affinity between the basilica and the church of Pakil.

== Architecture ==
The church forms a cruciform and has a measurement of 162 by 36 feet (49 by 11 m). It is constructed in the Corinthian and Ionic architectural orders. Its facade has classical Corinthian columns and cornices across a floral stone relief. The church's side entrance is elaborately designed which is typical of churches in Laguna. To one side of the facade is a belfry housing four small bells and one huge bell.

The main retablo is painted in white and has a pantheon of 14 saints housed in an elaborately carved niche with the Archangel Michael towering above. There are two smaller retablos on either side. Father Ronald Reagan constructed an altar marble consecrated by Archbishop Alejandro Olalia in 1959 where the image of the Nuestra Señora de los Dolores was enshrined. A pulpit and a large painting depicting the concept of Heaven, Earth, Hell, and Judicium Finale (Final Judgement), created by Jose Dans, a 19th-century artist from Paete, can also be found. A life-sized figure of a crucified Christ is found in a smaller retablo near the church entrance. The church's Stations of the Cross were made by local artists.

Inside the church, there are original century-old images and church ornaments. Adjoining the church are a convent, sacristy, adoration room/chapel, and an ecclesiastical museum in honor of the Our Lady of Turumba. The museum contains clothes, perfumes, jewelry, and other historic memorabilia. The original oil painting, found by fishermen, can also be found inside the chapel.

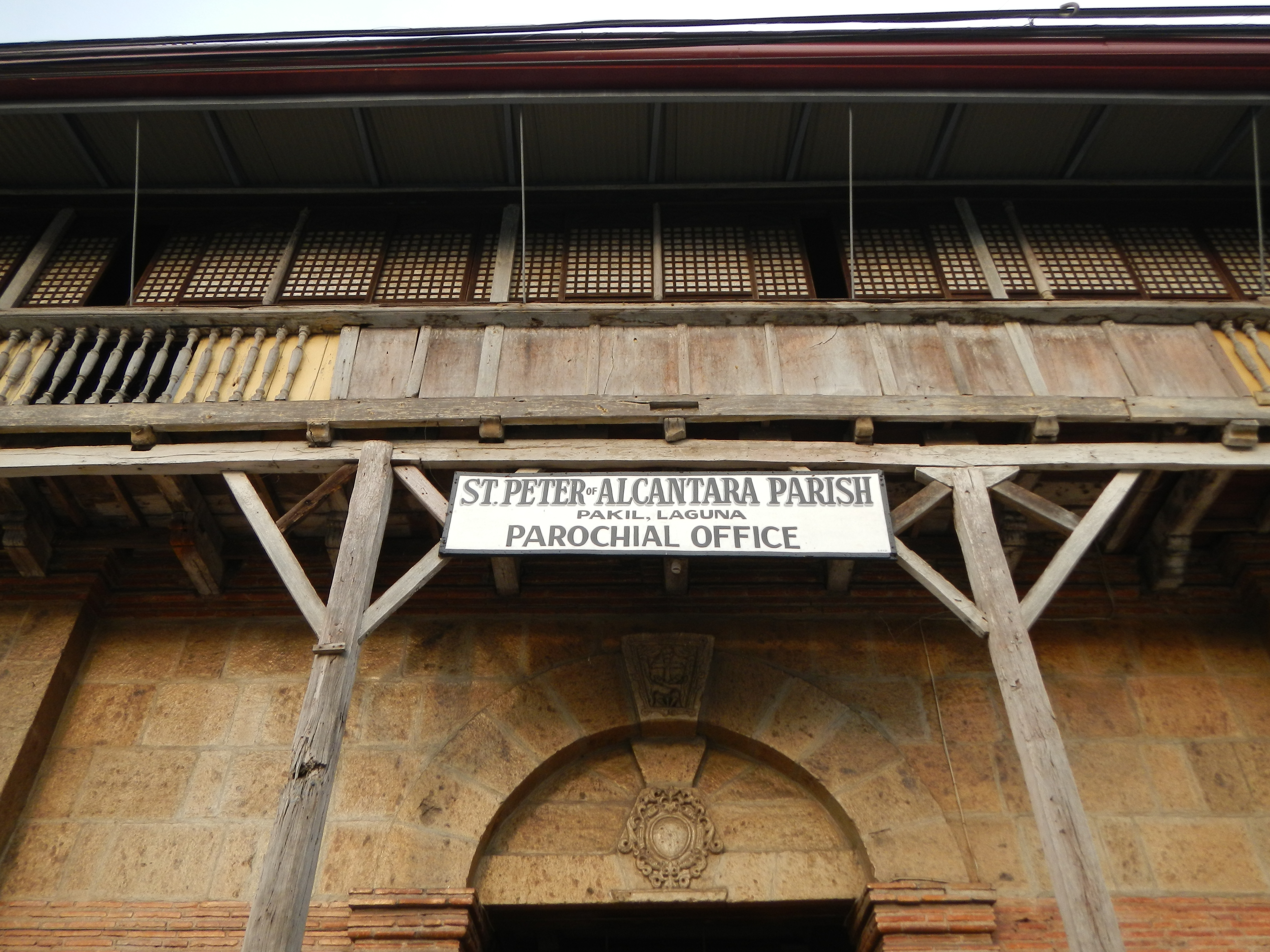
Parochial office

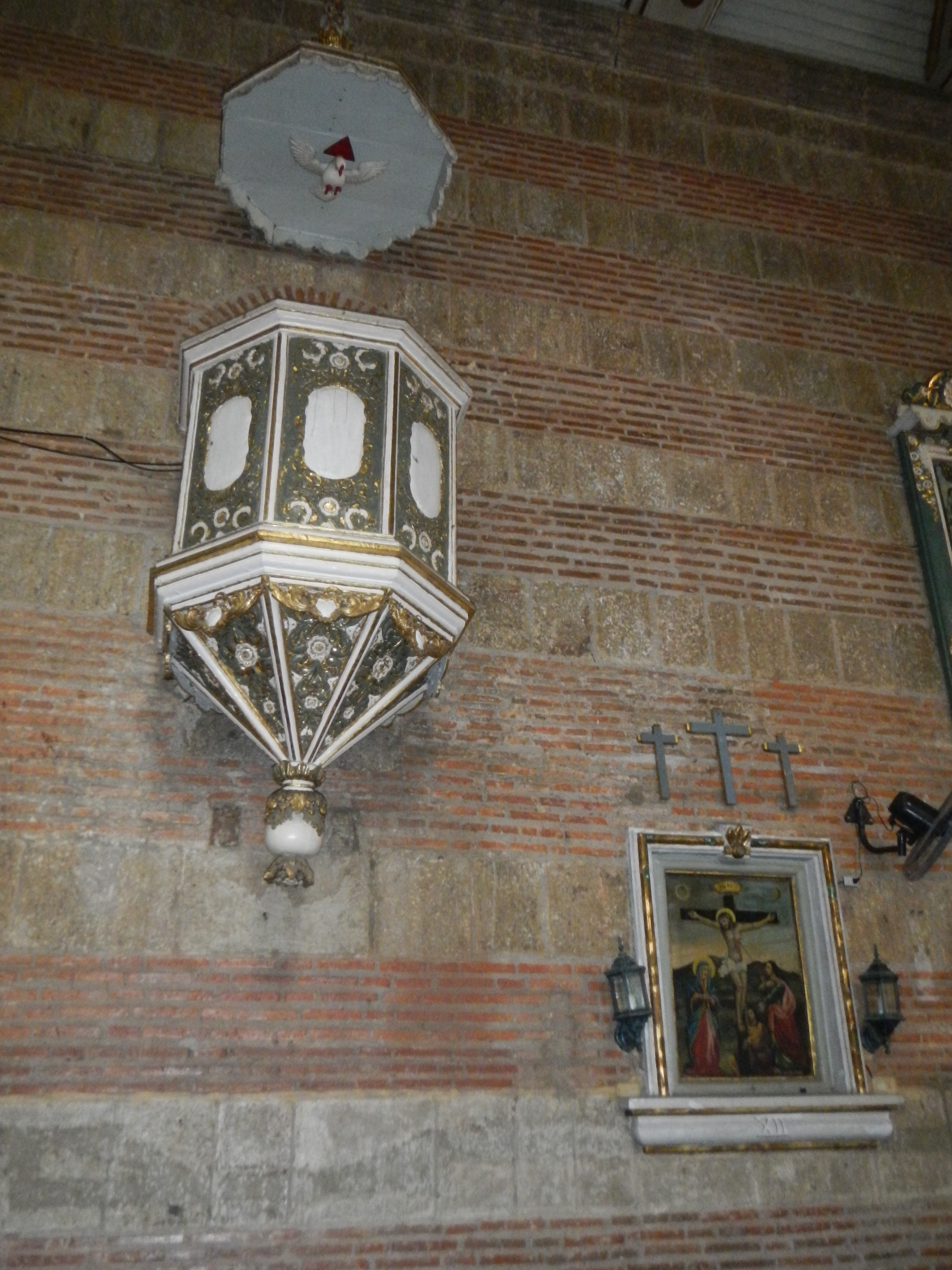
Pulpit

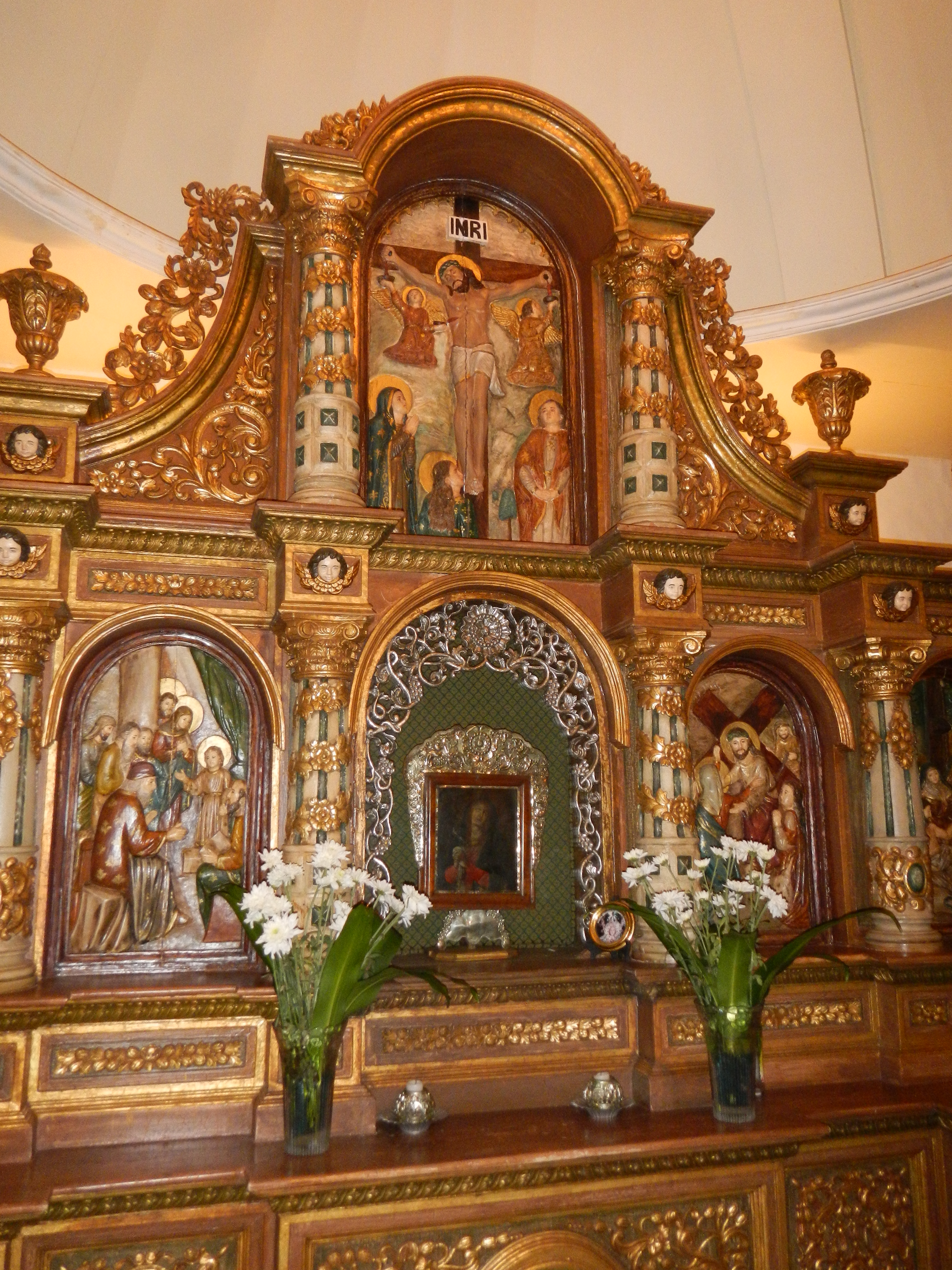
Retablo of the Turumba Chapel

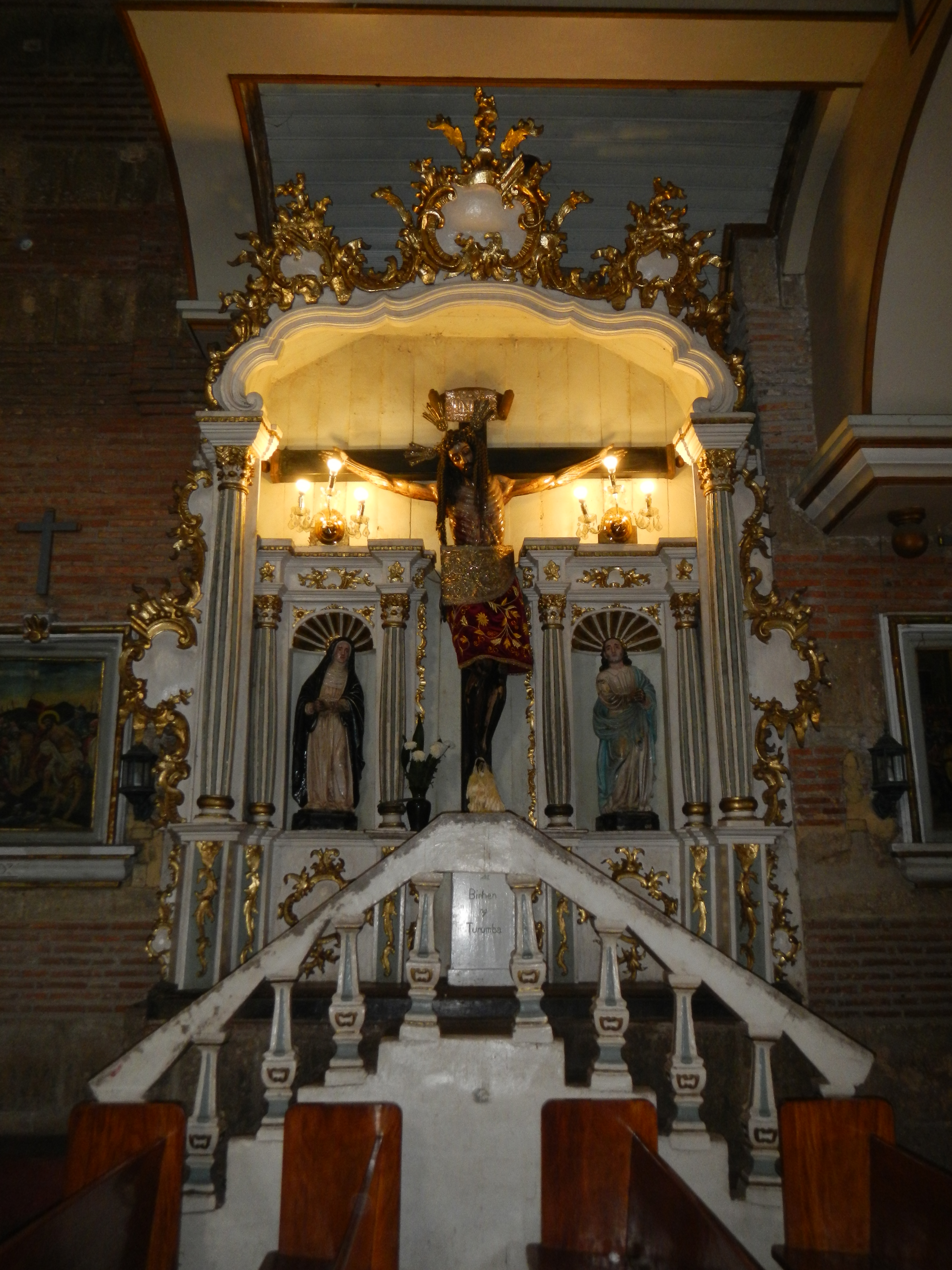
Minor retablo with crucified Christ

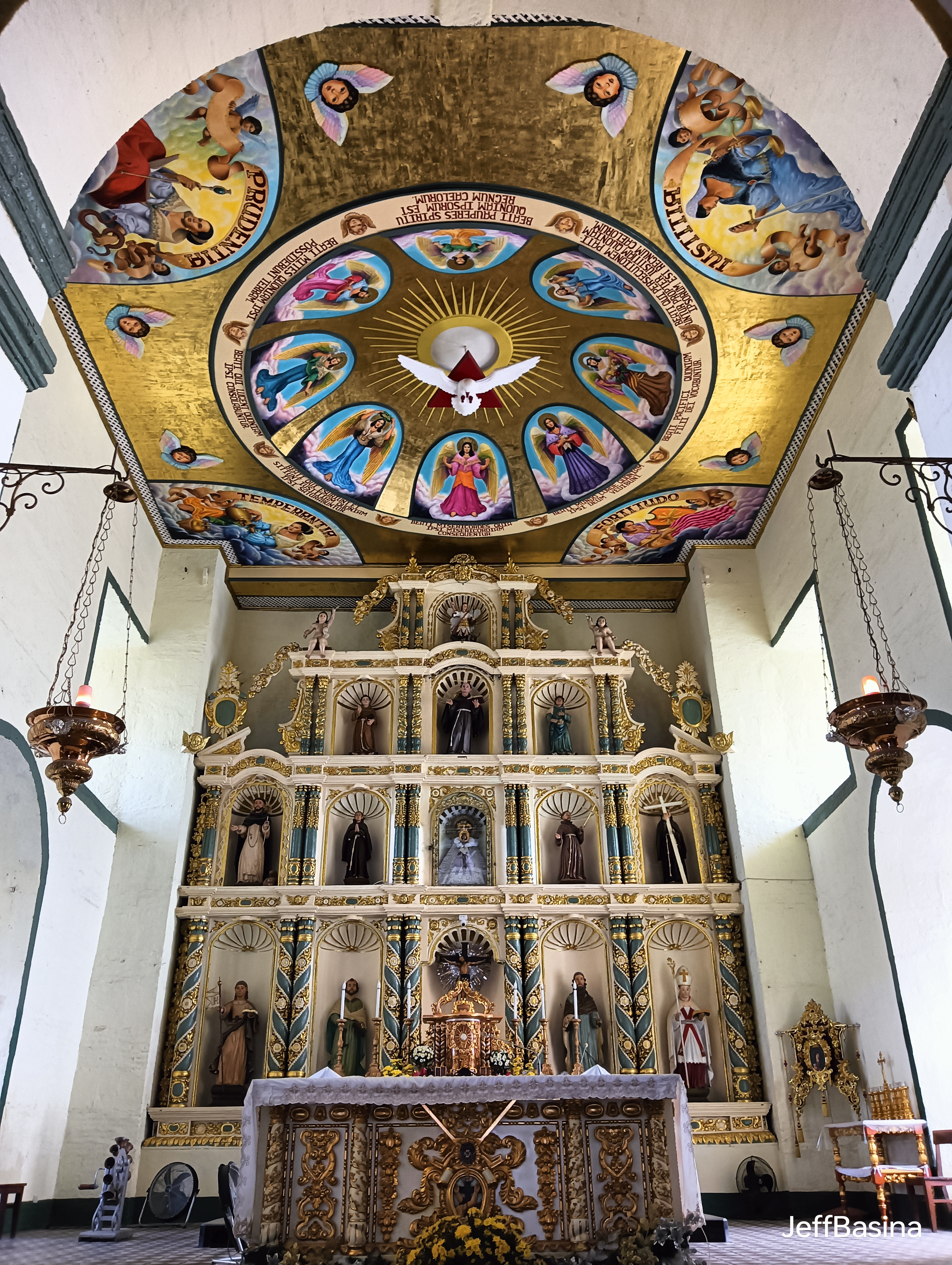
Retablo Mayor

== Our Lady of Turumba ==
The Nuestra Señora de los Dolores de Turumba (Our Lady of Sorrows of Turumba) is a 9 by 11 inches (23 by 28 cm) oil on canvas painting of the Virgin Mary. It is a replica of Nuestra Señora de las Antiguas, which was found by fishermen on September 15, 1788, after a storm. It was found floating in Laguna de Bay on the bank of the Matamig River and its presence began the devotion of Our Lady by the church. The Turumba Festival in honor of the Our Lady of Sorrows is the "largest and longest religious celebration in the country". It consists of seven Turumba novenas, or lupi, for seven months commemorating the seven sorrows of the Virgin Mary.

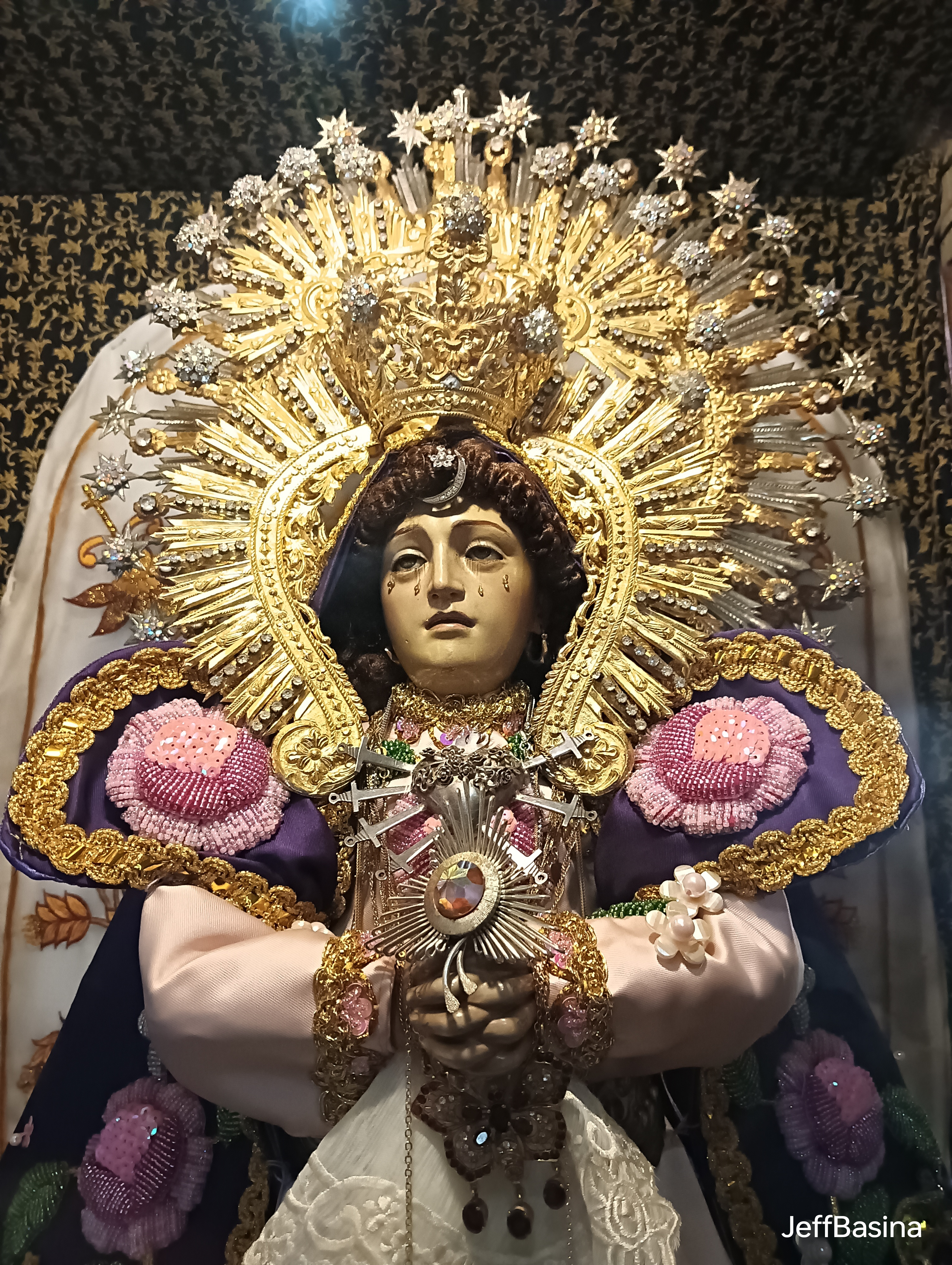
The Primera Replica of Nuestra Señora de los Dolores de Turumba enshrined to its chapel housing the original framed image.

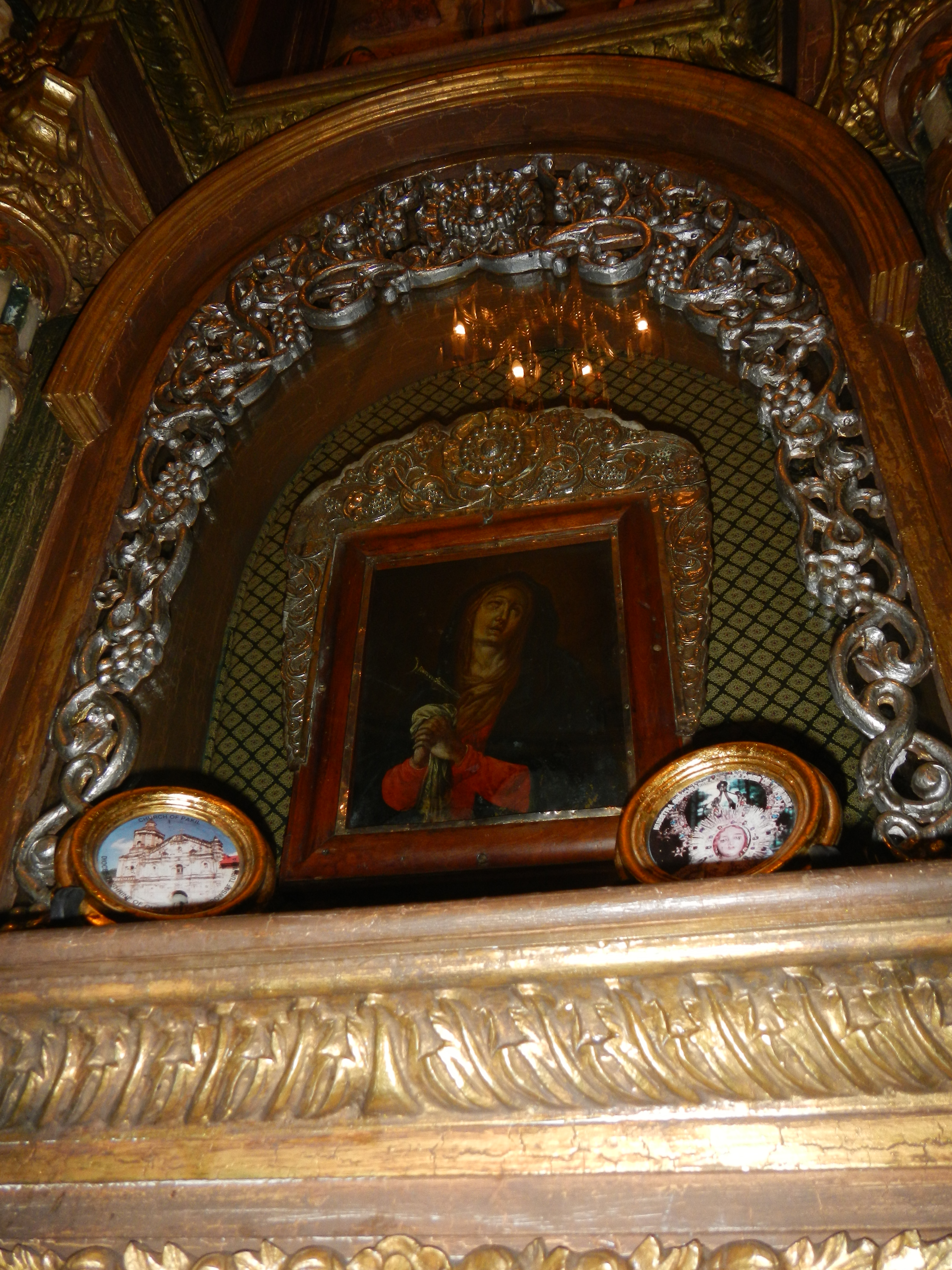
Original Painting of the Our Lady of Turumba in its shrine

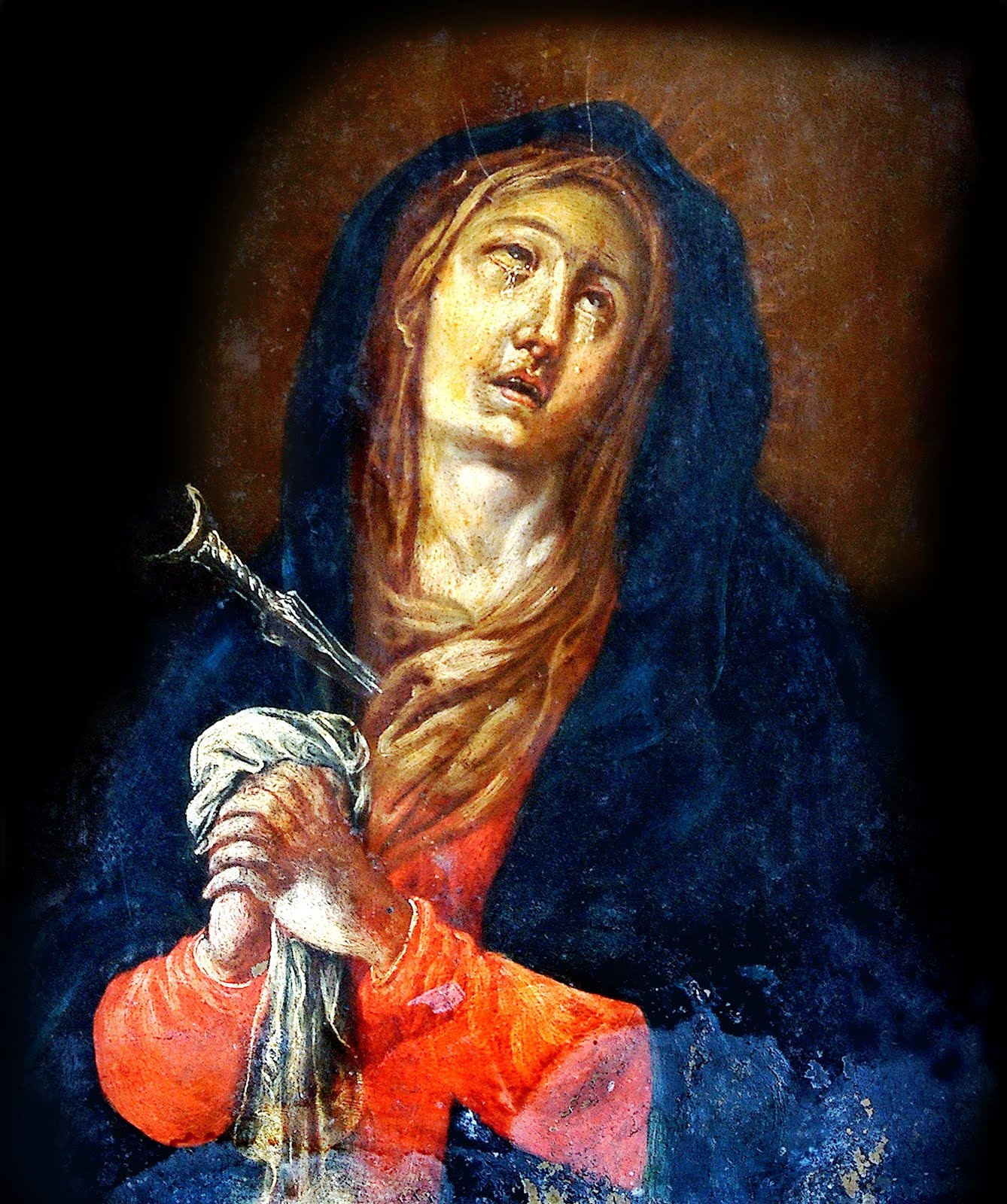
Original painting of Our Lady of Turumba

== In popular culture ==
Pakil church served as filming location for the Regal Entertainment film series Shake, Rattle & Roll 11 starring Maja Salvador in the episode 'Diablo' in 2009 film and ABS-CBN television series Juan dela Cruz starring Coco Martin and the show's follow-up series My Little Juan. In 1983, the celebration of Turumba was featured in the film Turumba by Kidlat Tahimik. The church was also used a setting by Martin when he directed his 2017 film Ang Panday.

== Bibliography ==
- Huerta, Felix de (1865). Estado geográfico, topográfico, estadístico, histórico-religioso [Geographical, topographical, statistical, historical and religious state] (in Spanish). Binondo: Imprenta de M. Sanchez y Ca.
- Historical Markers: Regions I-IV and CAR (in Filipino). Manila: National Historical Institute (Philippines). 1993. p. 88. ISBN 9715380611.
- Santoro, Nicholas (2011). Mary In Our Life: Atlas of the Names and Titles of Mary, the Mother of Jesus, and their Place in Marian Devotion. pp. 350–351. ISBN 978-1-4620-4021-6.
