= Confraternity of the Immaculate Conception =

Roman Catholic lay apostolate

The Confraternity of the Immaculate Conception of the Blessed Virgin Mary is one of the oldest lay apostolates still operating in the Roman Catholic Church, having been part of the Congregation of Marian Fathers of the Immaculate Conception founded by Stanislaw Papczynski. "The Blessed Marian Founder fervently encouraged his spiritual sons to establish confraternities of the Immaculate Conception at Marian churches. The first laws of the Order of 1694-1698 speak of this already."

The Confraternity of the Immaculate Conception predates the Congregation of the Marians of the Immaculate Conception. The Blue Scapular originated in Italy and is connected with the person of the Venerable Servant of God, Ursula Benincasa (1547-1618), who, in the year 1583, founded the Congregation of the Oblates of the Immaculate Conception of the Most Blessed Virgin Mary. She also founded the Hermitage of the Contemplative Nuns of the Immaculate Conception. The rule of both communities was approved by Pope Gregory XV on April 7, 1623.

== Philippine Association History ==
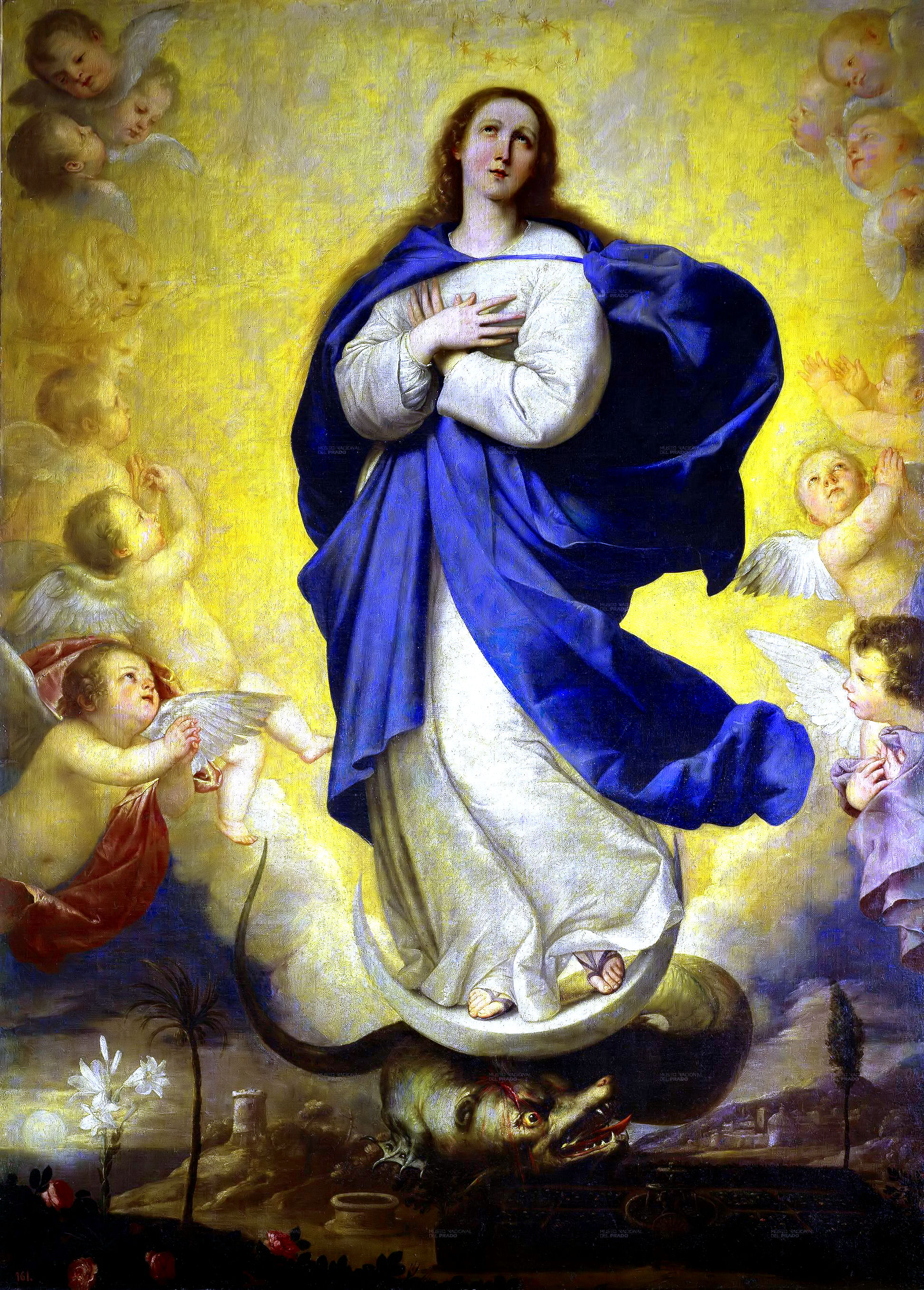
The Immaculate Conception is honored as the principal patroness of the Catholic association.

The Cofradia de la Inmaculada Concepcion (English: Confraternity of the Immaculate Conception) is a Filipino Roman Catholic Marian Apostolate focusing on the public veneration of the Blessed Virgin Mary through various Marian titles found in the Philippines. The group began in 1978 as an offshoot confraternity associated with the Manila Cathedral and the Intramuros Administration of the Philippines.

In February 2000, it became an approved apostolate under the Archdiocese of Manila through Archbishop Jaime Sin. It is mostly known for the Grand Marian Procession, often held just before the Feast of the Immaculate Conception, the patronal feast of the Philippines authorised by Pope Pius XII in September 1942 through his papal bull Impositi Nobis.

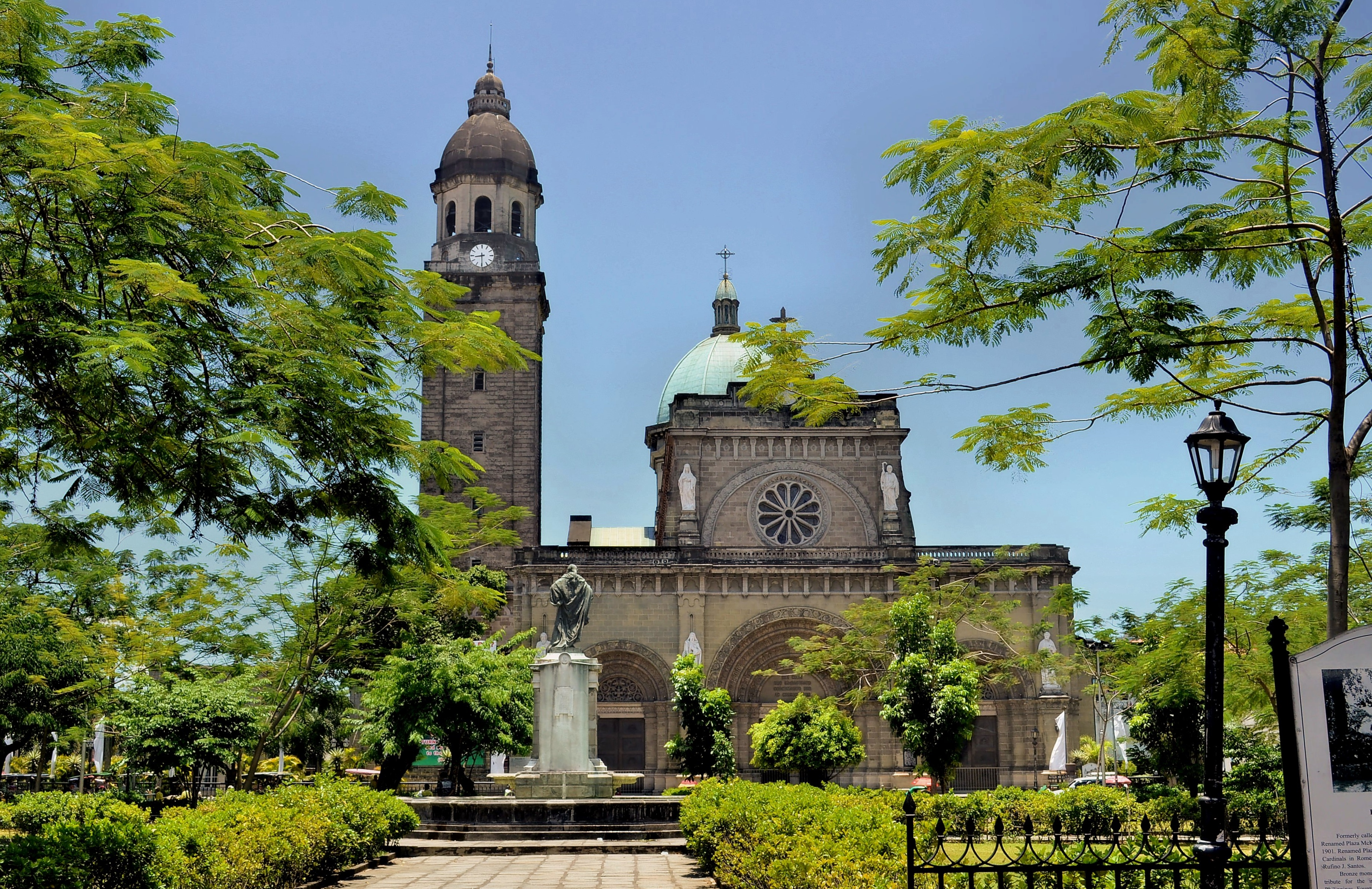
The Cathedral-Basilica of the Immaculate Conception, where the Grand Marian Procession of Intramuros is held annually since 1978. Aduana street, Intramuros, Manila.

== History ==
According to early Spanish historical records in The Annals of the Manila Cathedral (Spanish: Las Anales de la Catedral de Manila), the first Marian procession held in Intramuros began on December 8, 1619, and lasted for fifteen days. Throughout the centuries of Spanish colonial rule, the practice varied in terms of the days on which the procession was held. Today, the group is specifically known for conducting yearly novena services and a Intramuros Grand Marian Procession, which is an annual public parade and floral celebration of some of the select and most prominent Marian images in the country.

The dogma of the Catholic Church on the Immaculate Conception, was declared in 1854. Through the centuries the church has become ever more aware that Mary, "full of grace" through God, was redeemed from the moment of her conception. That is what the dogma of the Immaculate Conception confesses, as Pope Pius IX proclaimed in 1854: The most Blessed Virgin Mary was, from the first moment of her conception, by a singular grace and privilege of almighty God and by virtue of the merits of Jesus Christ, Savior of the human race, preserved immune from all stain of original sin.

Then procession intended to promote religious catechism through publicly parading images outside the Manila cathedral was on the Feast of the Immaculate Conception. The parade is oftentimes televised by various local Filipino media television outlets, namely the ABS-CBN and GMA Networks.

In addition, the Cofradia is known for selecting only more than ninety of the most prominent and liturgically inspiring Marian images in the country, most notably the ones featured, as the canonically crowned images in the Philippines such as the Our Lady of La Naval de Manila and Our Lady of Manaoag. The event is often chaperoned by the Armed Forces of the Philippines, which sponsors the security of the event.

In addition, a special novenario and Holy Mass is offered for the financial sponsors of each Marian image (Spanish: Hermanos y hermanas mayores) as well as the caretakers (Spanish: Camareros) of the images. In the Philippines, the Feast of the Immaculate Conception has become one of the grandest Marian events in the country, highlighting its festivities well into Advent and Christmas.

== Regulatory limits ==
By joining the Confraternity of the Immaculate Conception, the faithful take upon themselves certain obligations and receive spiritual benefits. The ceremony of admittance into the Confraternity includes the investiture with the Blue Scapular. Confraternity members ought to piously wear the Scapular always as an outward mark of veneration for the Immaculate Conception of the B.V.M. and a symbol that sets them apart as people particularly dedicated to the Blessed Virgin Mary. The rite of admission into the Confraternity of the Congregation of Marian Fathers takes place during a special liturgical ceremony, which may be presided over by a Marian priest or deacon, or by the priest or deacon delegated by the Marians. The faithful who live at a great distance from the church that hosts the Confraternity of the Immaculate Conception, and thus are prevented from participation in the Confraternity's meetings but who wish to belong, may be admitted into the Confraternity. The admission is performed through a written petition addressed to the local moderator of the Confraternity and then through acceptance of the certificate of membership. In this case, a priest or deacon (either religious order member or diocesan) may confer the Blue Scapular, upon prior obtaining of a sub-delegation issued by the Superior General of the Congregation of Marian Fathers.

There is the opportunity of accepting the Scapular of the Immaculate Conception of the Most Blessed Virgin Mary without joining its Confraternity. The faithful who wish to accept the Scapular but do not want to belong to the said Confraternity should clearly state this when asking for the Scapular. The faithful who wear the Blue Scapular but are not formally aggregated (admitted into the Confraternity of the Marian Fathers and listed in their Register) belong spiritually to the broadly understood community of the Theatine Fathers — custodians of the Blue Scapular. In addition, they share in the spiritual benefits of the Archconfraternity of the Immaculate Conception, which is located at the Basilica of Sant’Andrea della Valle in Rome and run by the Theatine Fathers.

In the Philippine Association The Cofradia is known in the country for administering one of the strictest rules and regulations regarding the approval of Marian images being publicly paraded in Intramuros.

Due to various illicit gay laypersons who tend to promote a revised version of a Marian image, some images are found not in liturgical harmony with the approved traditional iconography promoted by the Roman Catholic Church. In addition, only the select Marian images with the greatest public devotion are often allowed to enter into the parade.
