= Pakil =

Municipality in Laguna, Philippines

Pakil Paquil
- Municipality
- Municipality of Pakil
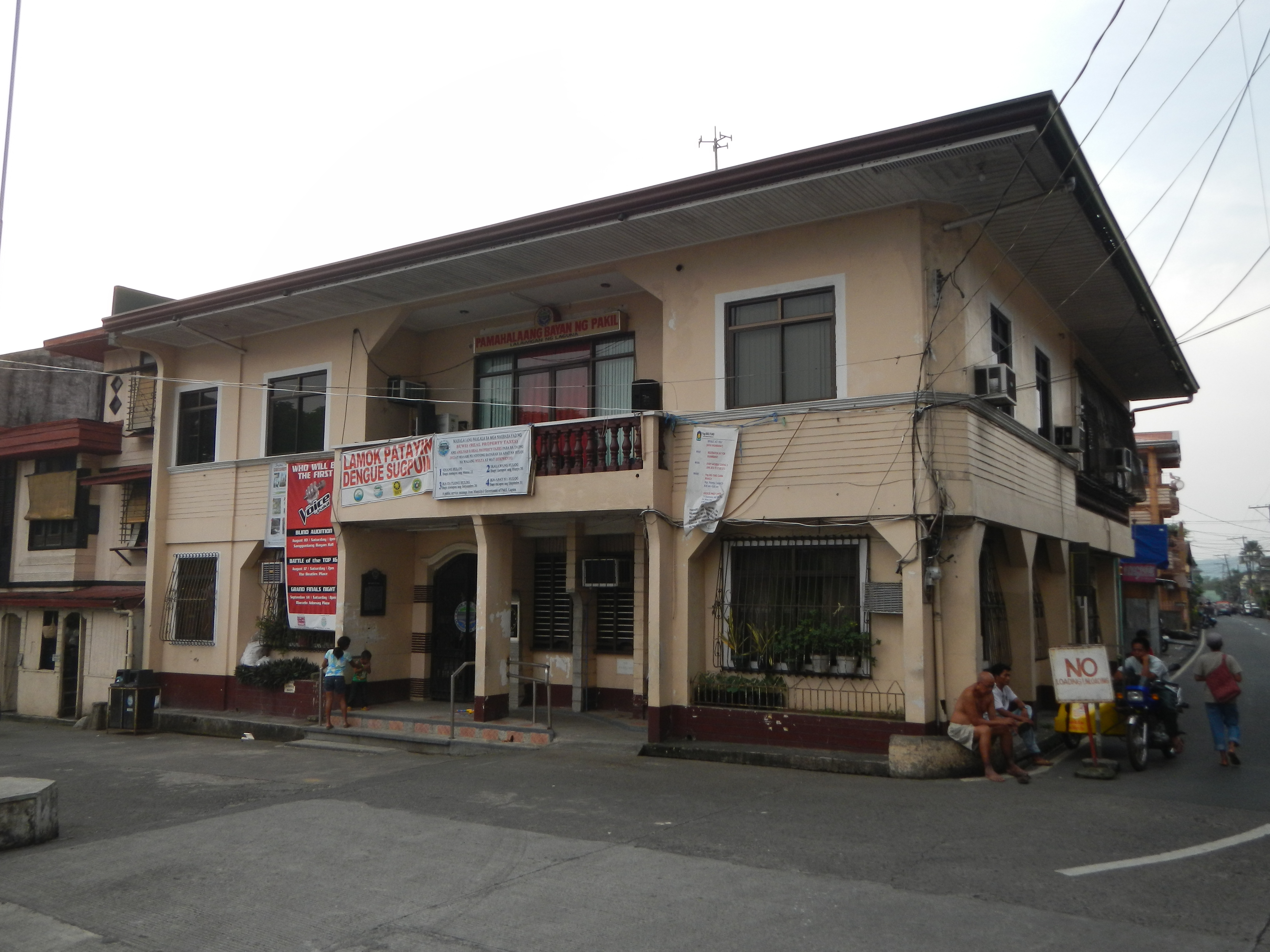
- Pakil Municipal Hall

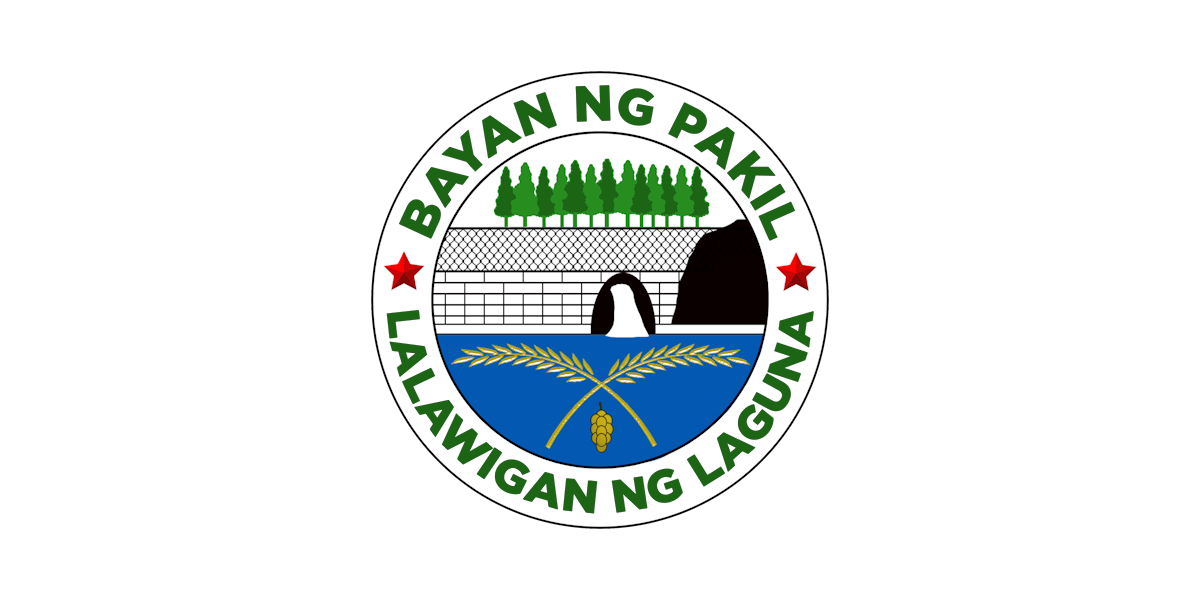
- Flag Seal
- Nickname: Pilgrimage Capital of Laguna
- Map of Laguna with Pakil highlighted
- Interactive map of Pakil
- Location within the Philippines
- Coordinates: 14°22′51″N 121°28′43″E
- Country: Philippines
- Region: Calabarzon
- Province: Laguna
- District: 4th district
- Founded: 1676
- Barangays: 13 (see Barangays)

Government
  - Type: Sangguniang Bayan
  - Mayor: Vincent L. Soriano
  - Vice Mayor: Vipops Charles D. Martinez
  - Representative: Benjamin C. Agarao Jr.
  - Municipal Council: Members: Vlacheslav Vaarniv D. Martinez; Aileen S. Cailles; Melody C. Familara; Jeffrey B. Cotoner; Mark Benito R. Caballero; Narciso A. Catarino; Aurelio Macapanpan-Gonzales; Geraldin V. Dizon
  - Electorate: 17,532 voters (2025)

Area
  - Total: 46.50 km^{2} (17.95 sq mi)
- Elevation: 162 m (531 ft)
- Highest elevation: 726 m (2,382 ft)
- Lowest elevation: 0 m (0 ft)

Population (2024 census)
  - Total: 23,972
  - Density: 515.5/km^{2} (1,335/sq mi)
  - Households: 5,841

Economy
  - Income class: 3rd municipal income class
  - Poverty incidence: 13.09% (2023)
  - Revenue: ₱ 134.4 million (2024)
  - Assets: ₱ 35.83 million (2024)
  - Expenditure: ₱ 55.39 million (2024)

Service provider
  - Electricity: First Laguna Electric Cooperative (FLECO)
- Time zone: UTC+8 (PST)
- ZIP code: 4017
- PSGC: 0403420000
- IDD : area code: +63 (0)49
- Native languages: Tagalog

Pakil, officially the Municipality of Pakil (Tagalog: Bayan ng Pakil), is a municipality in the province of Laguna, Philippines. According to the 2024 census, it has a population of 23,972 people.

== History ==
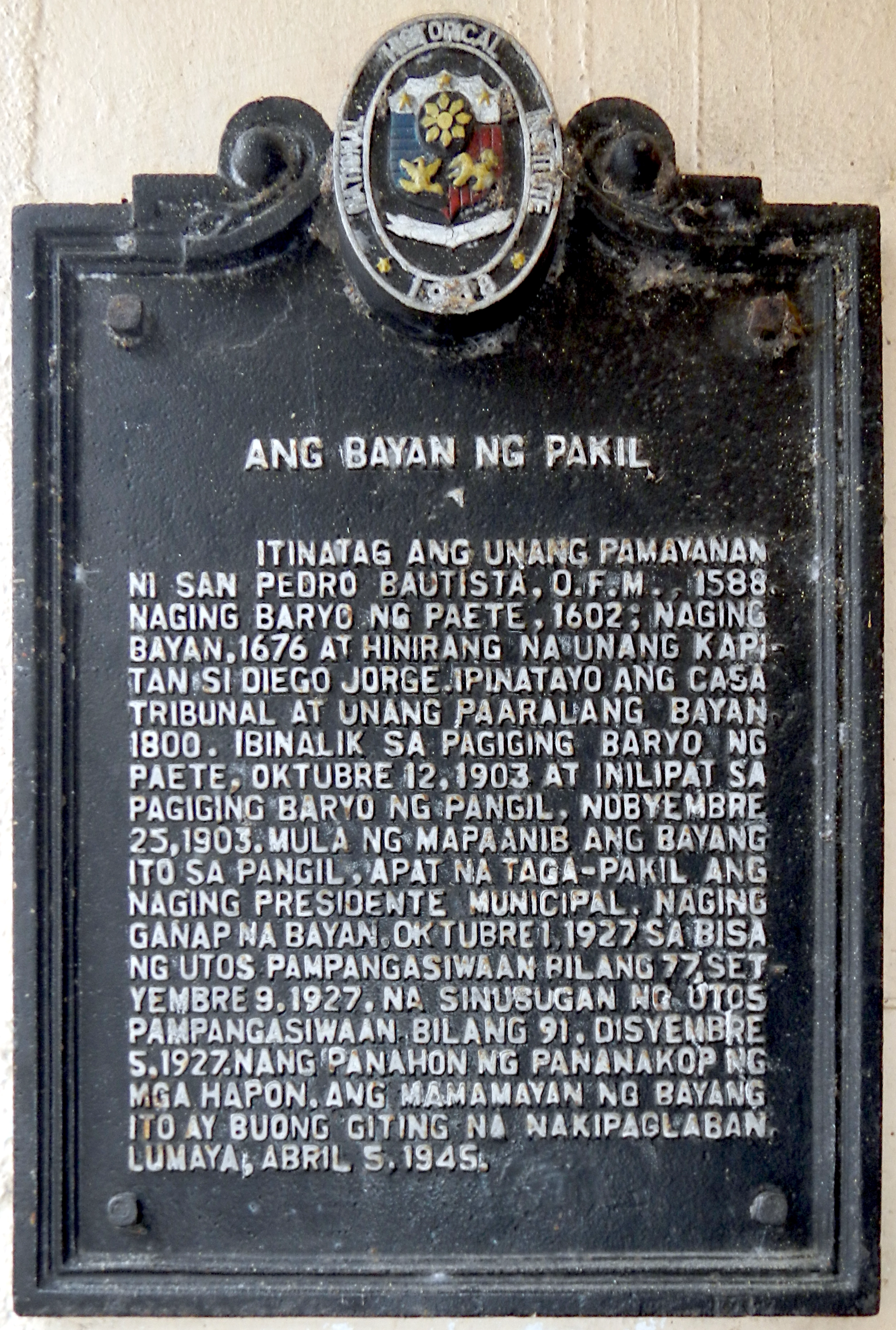
National historical marker installed in 1988 at the town hall

=== Spanish colonial period ===
When the Spanish conquistadors together with the Augustinians stationed at Bay came to the place in 1571, this colony was under the leadership of Gat Paquil whose name was used to name the settlement as "Paquil", which remained during the whole Spanish Regime and early part of the American period.

When the Franciscan missionaries came in 1578, Pakil was attached to Paete in 1602 as its "visita". Padre Francisco Barajas, made efforts to separate this town from Paete, and Don Diego Jorge became the first Capitan Municipal or Gobernadorcillo on May 12, 1676. Pakil was named as an independent town with the administration of the "Capitan Municipal" at the helm of the local colonial government, the last of whom was Capitan Municipal Don Nicolas Regalado.

=== American colonial period ===
With the change of government from the Spanish to Philippine, and eventually American after the total occupation of the Philippines by the United States after the defeat of the Philippine Republican Army in the Philippine–American War of 1898–1900, the Americans had to reorganize the pattern of the Civil Government in the country in 1901. It was Bernardo Gonzales was appointed the first Presidente Municipal (Municipal President) during the American Period until November 25, 1903. Upon the reorganization, the Public Law No. 1009, of the Philippine Commission, the town of Pakil was merged with Pangil in order to reduce the number of existing towns where the smaller towns are merged with more secure towns to stabilize the local economy due to the damages of the previous war. After nineteen years, On October 1, 1927, by virtue of Executive Order No. 77, Pakil was re-established as a municipality, with its spelling changed from Paquil to Pakil.

=== World War II and Japanese occupation ===
In 1942, the Japanese troops occupied Pakil, and in 1945, Pakil was liberated by the Philippine Commonwealth forces after the Philippine Army and Philippine Constabulary entered the town along with the local recognized guerrillas against the Japanese forces during the Second World War.

=== Modern era ===
In 1954, the sitios known as Casa Real, Casinsin and Kabulusan were converted into barrios. Durado followed suit in 1957.

== Geography ==
Pakil's land area consists of two non-contiguous parts, separated by Laguna de Bay. It borders Mabitac and Pangil to the north, Jalajala to the west, and Paete to the south. Pakil is 19 kilometres (12 mi) from Santa Cruz, 106 kilometres (66 mi) from Manila, and 67 kilometres (42 mi) from Lucena.

=== Barangays ===
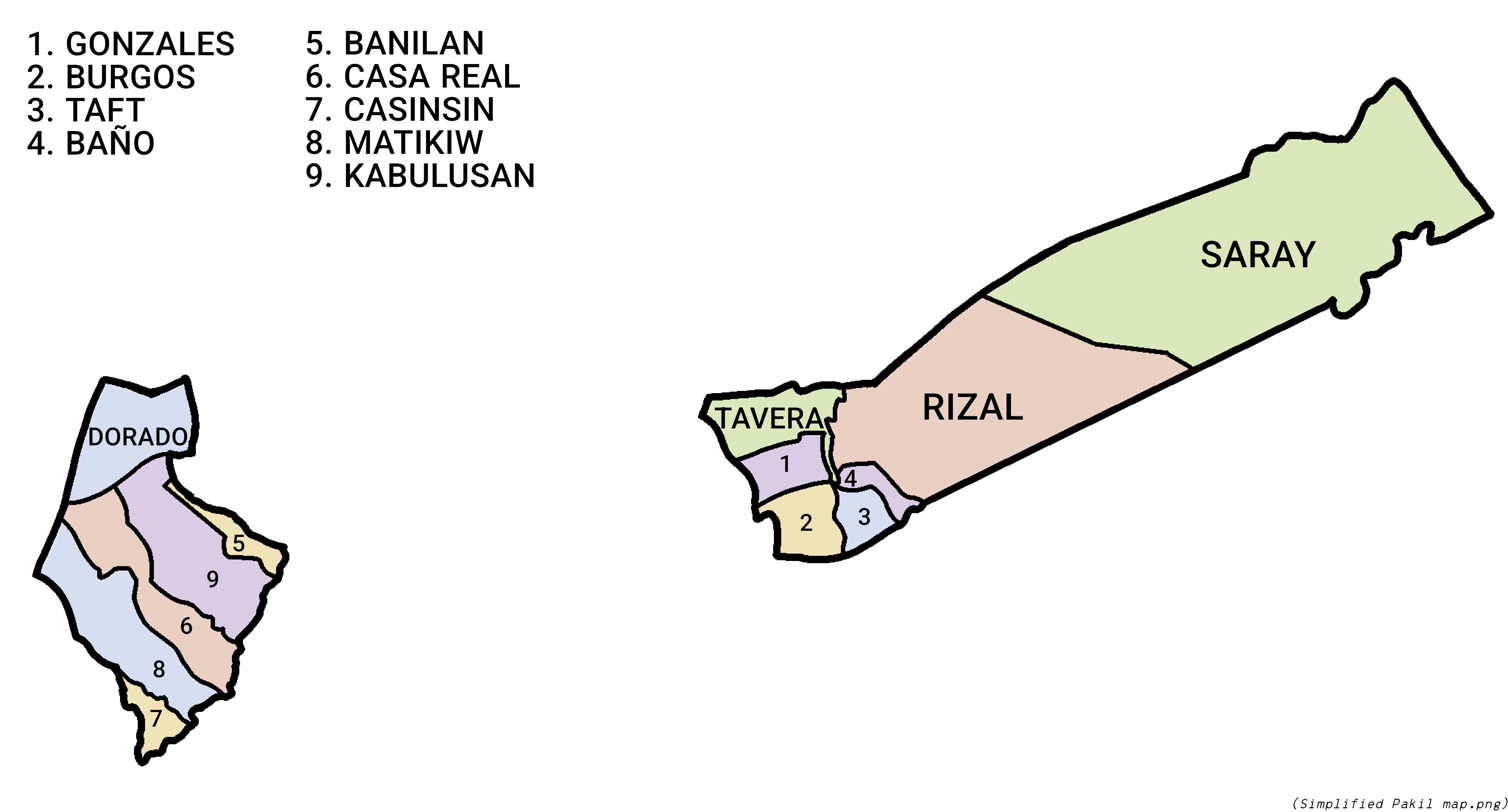
Barangay map of the western and eastern sections of Pakil

Pakil is politically subdivided into 13 barangays, as indicated in the matrix below. Each barangay consists of puroks and some have sitios.

PSGC	Barangay	Population			±% p.a.	
		2024		2010		
043420001	Banilan	7.7%	1,843	1,708	▴	0.53%
043420002	Baño	2.5%	593	485	▴	1.40%
043420003	Burgos (Poblacion)	9.2%	2,203	2,204	▾	0.00%
043420004	Casa Real	8.3%	1,992	1,401	▴	2.47%
043420005	Casinsin	9.1%	2,192	1,667	▴	1.92%
043420006	Dorado	1.1%	265	773	▾	−7.16%
043420007	Gonzalez (Poblacion)	10.9%	2,614	2,682	▾	−0.18%
043420008	Kabulusan	18.1%	4,330	3,482	▴	1.52%
043420009	Matikiw	3.4%	818	552	▴	2.77%
043420010	Rizal (Poblacion)	13.1%	3,130	2,440	▴	1.74%
043420011	Saray	1.7%	405	273	▴	2.77%
043420012	Taft (Poblacion)	5.4%	1,300	1,277	▴	0.12%
043420013	Tavera (Poblacion)	7.6%	1,810	1,868	▾	−0.22%
	Total		23,972	20,822	▴	0.98%

=== Climate ===
Climate data for Pakil, Laguna
Month	Jan	Feb	Mar	Apr	May	Jun	Jul	Aug	Sep	Oct	Nov	Dec	Year
Mean daily maximum °C (°F)	26 (79)	27 (81)	29 (84)	31 (88)	31 (88)	30 (86)	29 (84)	29 (84)	29 (84)	29 (84)	28 (82)	26 (79)	29 (84)
Mean daily minimum °C (°F)	22 (72)	22 (72)	22 (72)	23 (73)	24 (75)	25 (77)	24 (75)	24 (75)	24 (75)	24 (75)	24 (75)	23 (73)	23 (74)
Average precipitation mm (inches)	58 (2.3)	41 (1.6)	32 (1.3)	29 (1.1)	91 (3.6)	143 (5.6)	181 (7.1)	162 (6.4)	172 (6.8)	164 (6.5)	113 (4.4)	121 (4.8)	1,307 (51.5)
Average rainy days	13.4	9.3	9.1	9.8	19.1	22.9	26.6	24.9	25.0	21.4	16.5	16.5	214.5
Source: Meteoblue

== Demographics ==
Population census of Pakil
Year	Pop.	±% p.a.
1903	1,585	—
1939	2,451	+1.22%
1948	3,055	+2.48%
1960	4,765	+3.77%
1970	7,229	+4.25%
1975	8,375	+3.00%
1980	9,048	+1.56%
1990	13,438	+4.04%
1995	15,663	+2.91%
2000	18,021	+3.05%
2007	20,242	+1.62%
2010	20,822	+1.03%
2015	20,659	−0.15%
2020	23,495	+2.74%
2024	23,972	+0.48%
Source: Philippine Statistics Authority

In the 2024 census, the population of Pakil, Laguna, was 23,972 people, with a density of 520 inhabitants per square kilometre or 1,300 inhabitants per square mile.

== Economy ==
Poverty incidence of Pakil (%)

Source: Philippine Statistics Authority

== Culture ==
Music in Pakil was formally introduced by San Pedro Bautista in 1586, during his tenure as Guardian of the Franciscan order. He established what is regarded as the first music academy in the country, initially enrolling around 400 children from communities around Laguna de Bay. These students began as church choir members and were trained to create musical instruments using locally available materials such as bamboo, tin, wood, and coconut shells. They were known as tiples and later mentored younger children to join the choir.

Over time, music became deeply embedded in the community, with residents actively teaching the youth to sing and play instruments. This tradition was passed down through generations. The Adonay family played a key role in promoting musical development and helped organize the first brass band in Pakil.

Tacio Celis further contributed by training children in reading musical notation and playing instruments. As a result, many young musicians from Pakil were able to pursue higher education through scholarships earned by performing in school bands.

Currently, Pakil Music Program is helping out young students to continue the rich musical heritage of the town. Pakil Music Program (PMP) is providing music education through note reading and instrument performances with the help of some retired musicians.

== Religion ==
=== St. Peter of Alcantara Parish ===
The St. Peter of Alcantara Parish, also the Diocesan Shrine of the Our Lady of Turumba is a Roman Catholic Church in Pakil and home to the Our Lady of Sorrows de Turumba.

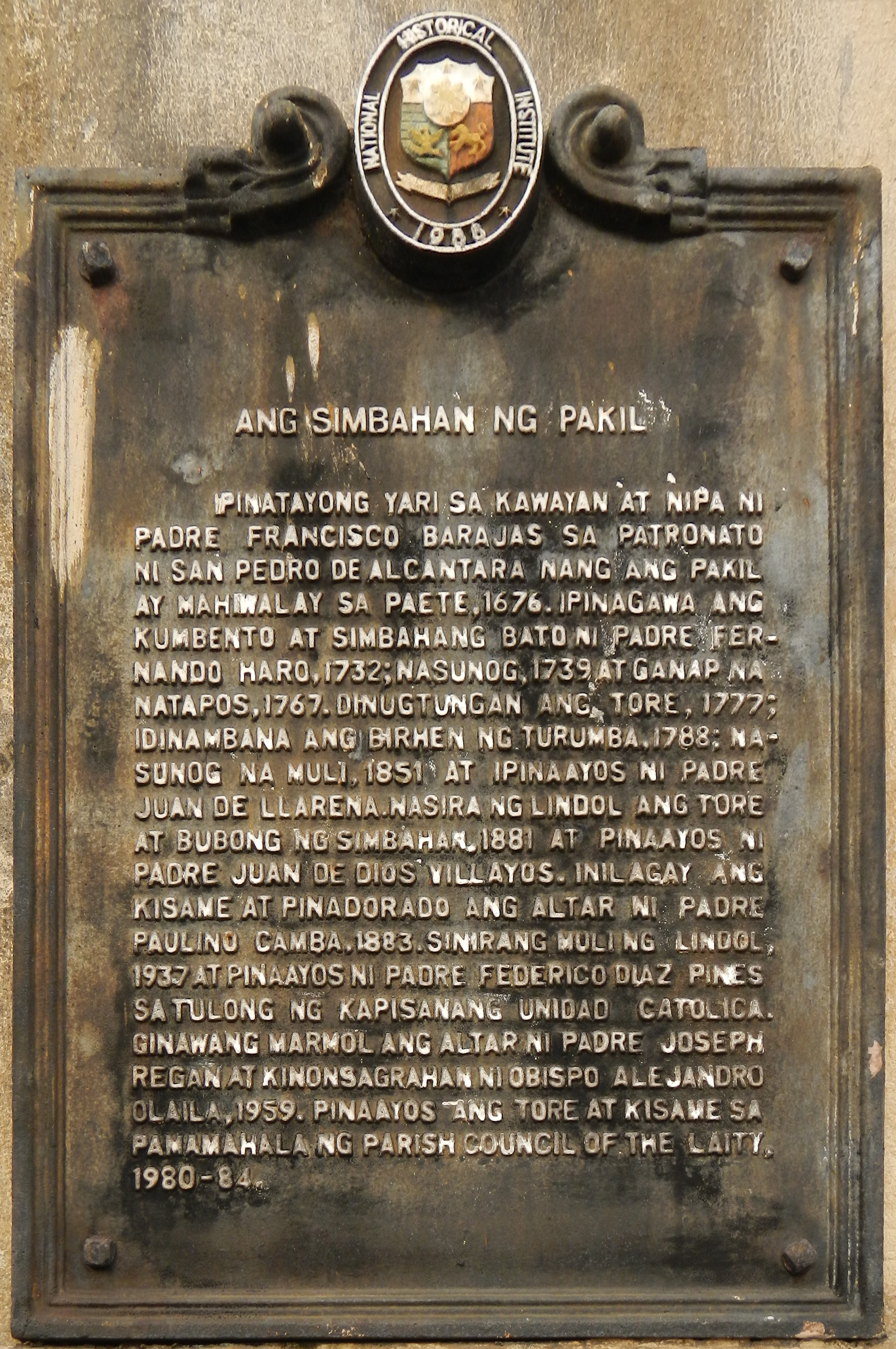
Historical Marker of Pakil Church

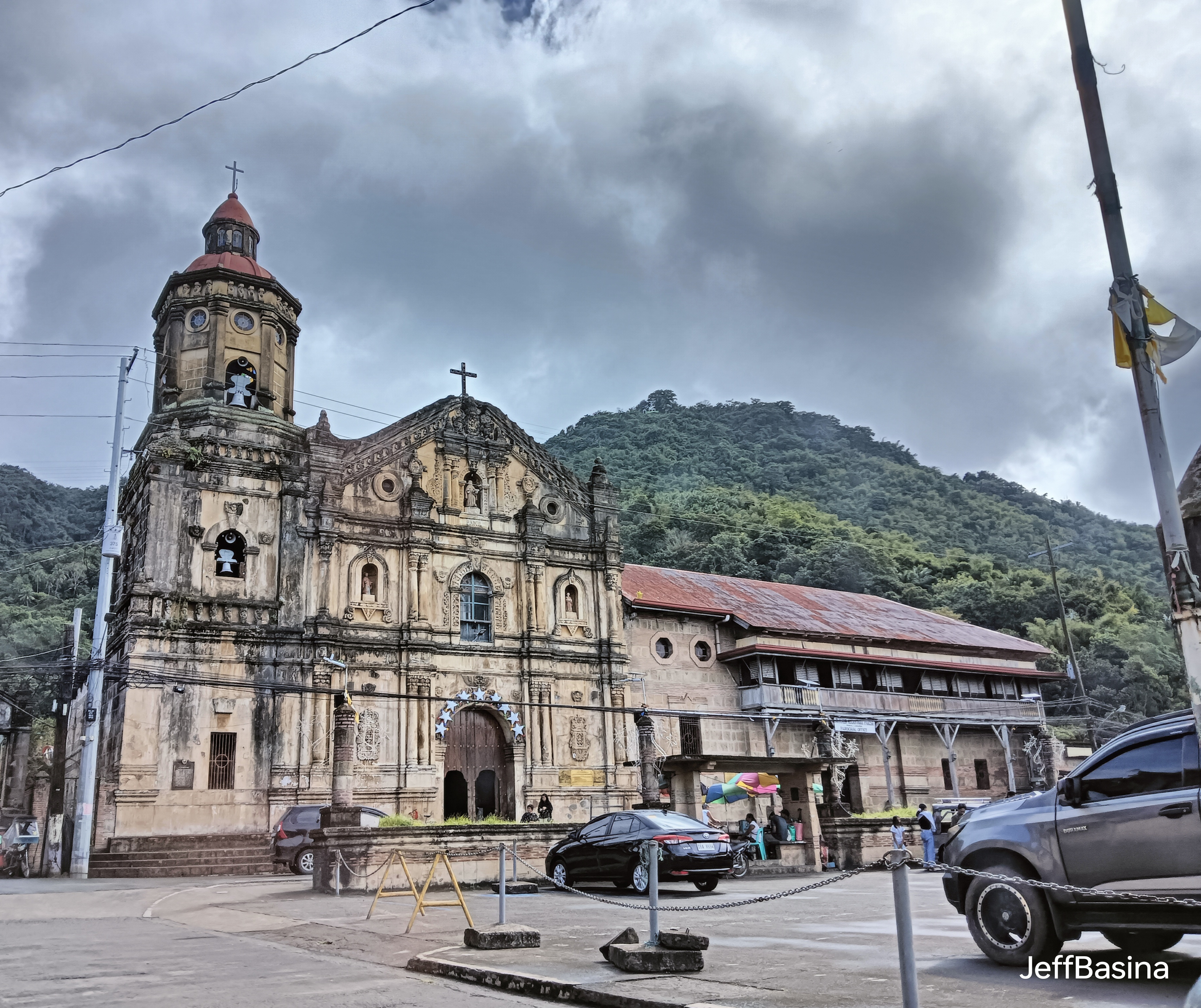
The Façade of Pakil Church

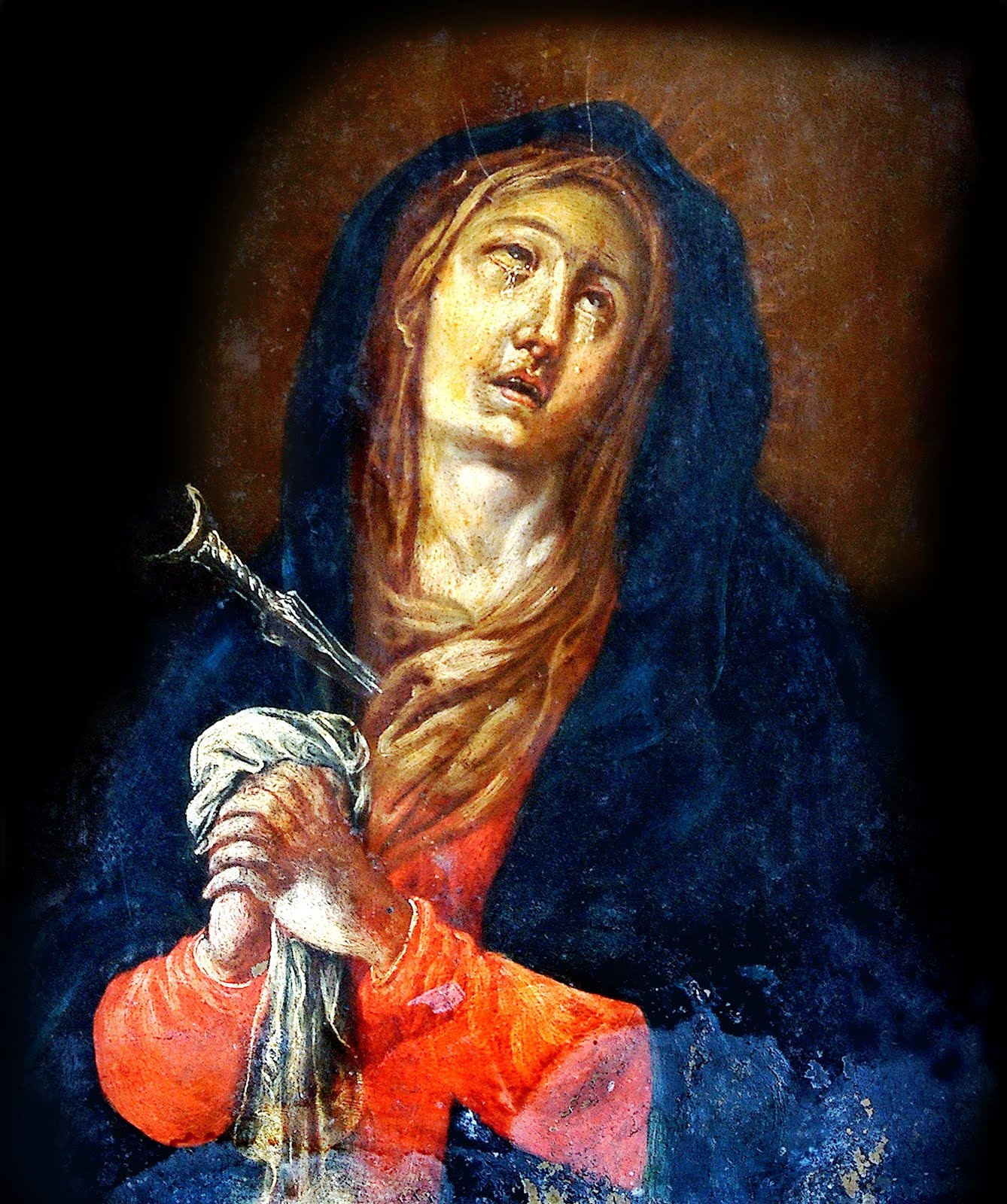
Original painting of Our Lady of Turumba

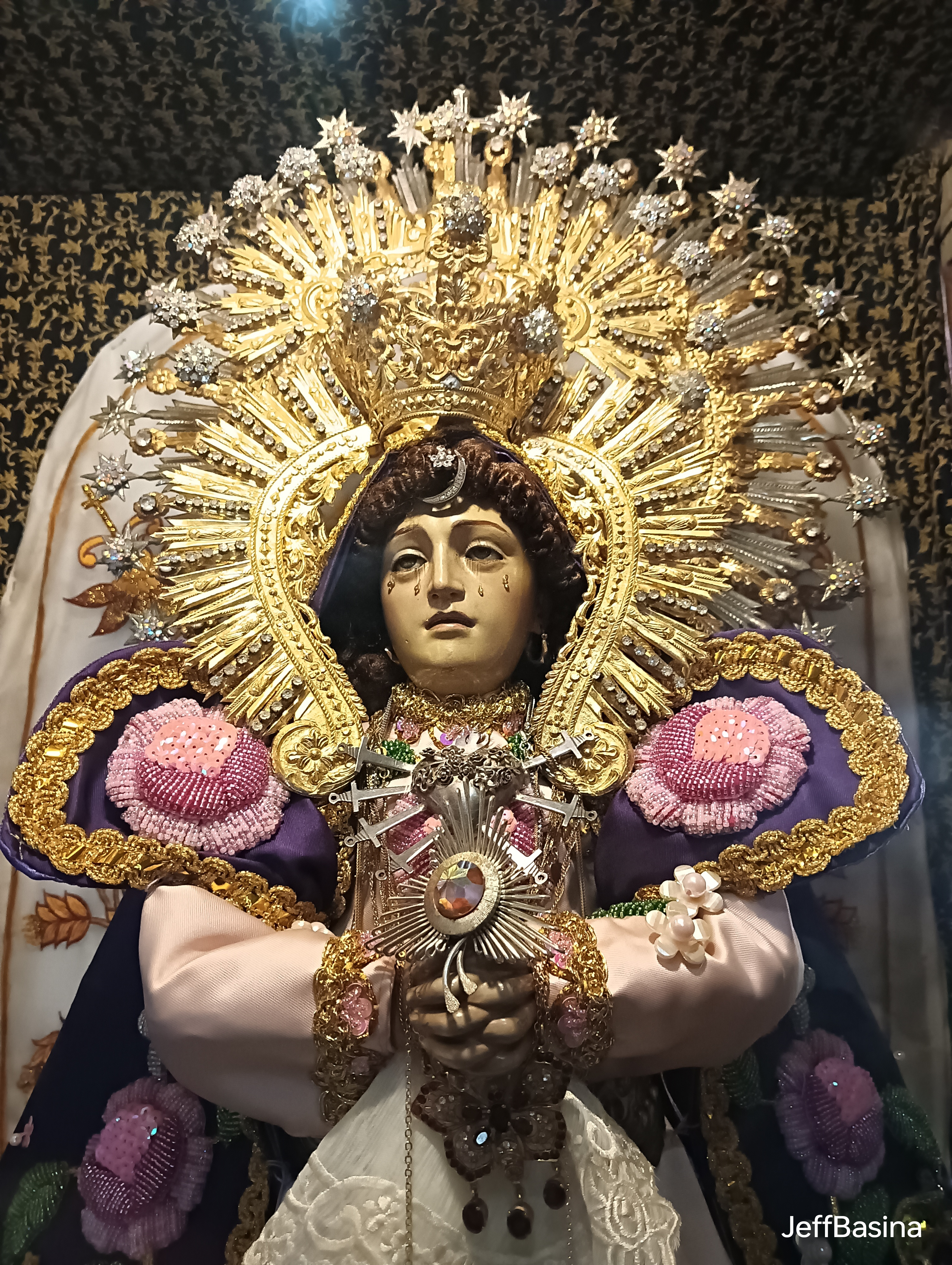
The Primera Replica of Nuestra Señora de los Dolores de Turumba enshrined to its chapel housing the original framed image.

=== Our Lady of Turumba ===
Nuestra Señora de los Dolores de Turumba ("Our Lady of Sorrows of Turumba") is the name for a specific statue of the Virgin Mary as Our Lady of Sorrows, enshrined in Pakil.

=== Liceo de Pakil ===
Liceo de Pakil is a private sectarian Catholic high school originally established by the Maryknoll Fathers in 1956. At first, the school was named Maryknoll Fathers High School following the namesake of its leaders. When the Maryknoll Fathers had to go to their mission in Davao, they ceded the leadership to the Maryknoll Sisters who subsequently changed the school's name into Maryknoll High School. Upon the termination of the mission of the Maryknoll Sisters in 1972, Bishop Pedro N. Bantigue invited the Augustinian Recollect Sisters to administer the school. The name was changed again to Mary Immaculate Academy by the Augustinian Recollect Sisters. In 1982, the school's name was changed to Liceo De Pakil by the Diocese of San Pablo. The first batch to graduate under Liceo de Pakil was the batch of 1983 graduating class. In 1986, the administration of the school was passed on to the Missionary Catechists of St. Therese (MCST). Liceo De Pakil is currently under the administration of the MCST and the Diocese of San Pablo.

== Education ==
The Pangil-Pakil Schools District Office governs all educational institutions within the municipality. It oversees the management and operations of all private and public, from primary to secondary schools.

=== Primary and elementary schools ===
- Banilan Elementary School
- Casa Real Elementary School
- Casinsin Elementary School
- Cornelio C. Dalena Elementary School
- Gisgis Elementary School
- Kabulusan Elementary School
- Liceo de Pakil
- Matikiw Elementary School
- Maulawin Elementary School
- Pakil Elementary School
- Sulib Elementary School

=== Secondary schools ===
- Balian National High School
- Balian National High School (Galalan Annex)
- Dambo National High School
- Liceo de Pakil

== Notable personalities ==
- Marcelo Adonay - major Philippine composer and church musician.
- Jun Regalado - one of the most prolific drummers in the Philippines.
- Jeff Cagandahan – prominent Filipino intersex man and intersex human rights activist who first successfully petitioned the Philippine courts to change name and sex markers.
