= Marikina Church =

Roman Catholic church in Marikina, Philippines

- Diocesan Shrine and Parish of Nuestra Señora de los Desamparados
- OLA Church
- Pandiyosesis na Dambana at Parokya ng Ina ng mga Walang Mag-Ampon (Filipino); Santuario Diocesano y Parroquia de Nuestra Señora de los Desamparados (Spanish)
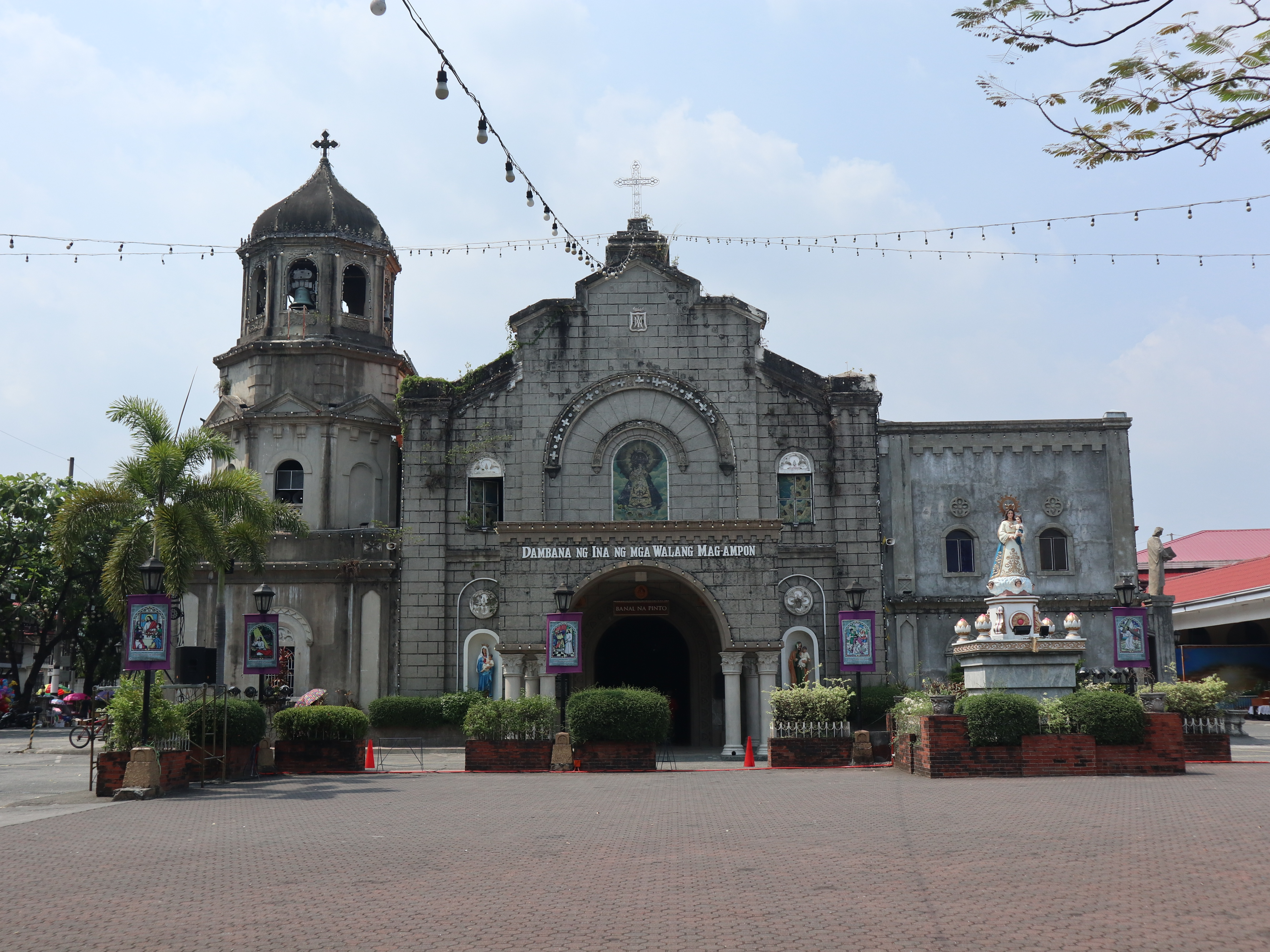
- Church facade in 2023
- Marikina Church
- 14°37′50″N 121°5′46″E
- Location: Santa Elena, Marikina
- Country: Philippines
- Denomination: Roman Catholic
- Website: OLA Marikina

History
- Status: Diocesan Shrine
- Founded: 1572; 454 years ago
- Dedication: Our Lady of the Abandoned
- Consecrated: 1957; 69 years ago

Architecture
- Architectural type: Church building
- Style: Baroque
- Completed: 1957; 69 years ago

Specifications
- Materials: Adobe, sand, gravel, cement, mortar, and steel

Administration
- Province: Manila
- Diocese: Antipolo
- Deanery: Our Lady of the Abandoned
- Parish: Our Lady of the Abandoned

Clergy
- Rector: Fr. Lamberto S. Ramos

The Diocesan Shrine and Parish of Nuestra Señora de los Desamparados (en:Our Lady of the Abandoned), commonly known as Marikina Church, is a Roman Catholic church in Marikina, the Philippines. The church enshrines one of several images of the Madonna and Child venerated as miraculous, which has received a Pontifical decree of coronation.

The church itself is a testament of a religious controversy rooting back from Marikina's early history wherein both the Jesuits and Augustinians fought over the ecclesiastical control of the area. The church is also known for featuring Metro Manila's longest Holy Week processions with around 87 floats as of 2023, and the third overall after the St. Augustine Parish in the town of Baliuag and the San Isidro Labrador Parish in the town of Pulilan, both located in the province of Bulacan and featuring at least 110 floats.

== History ==
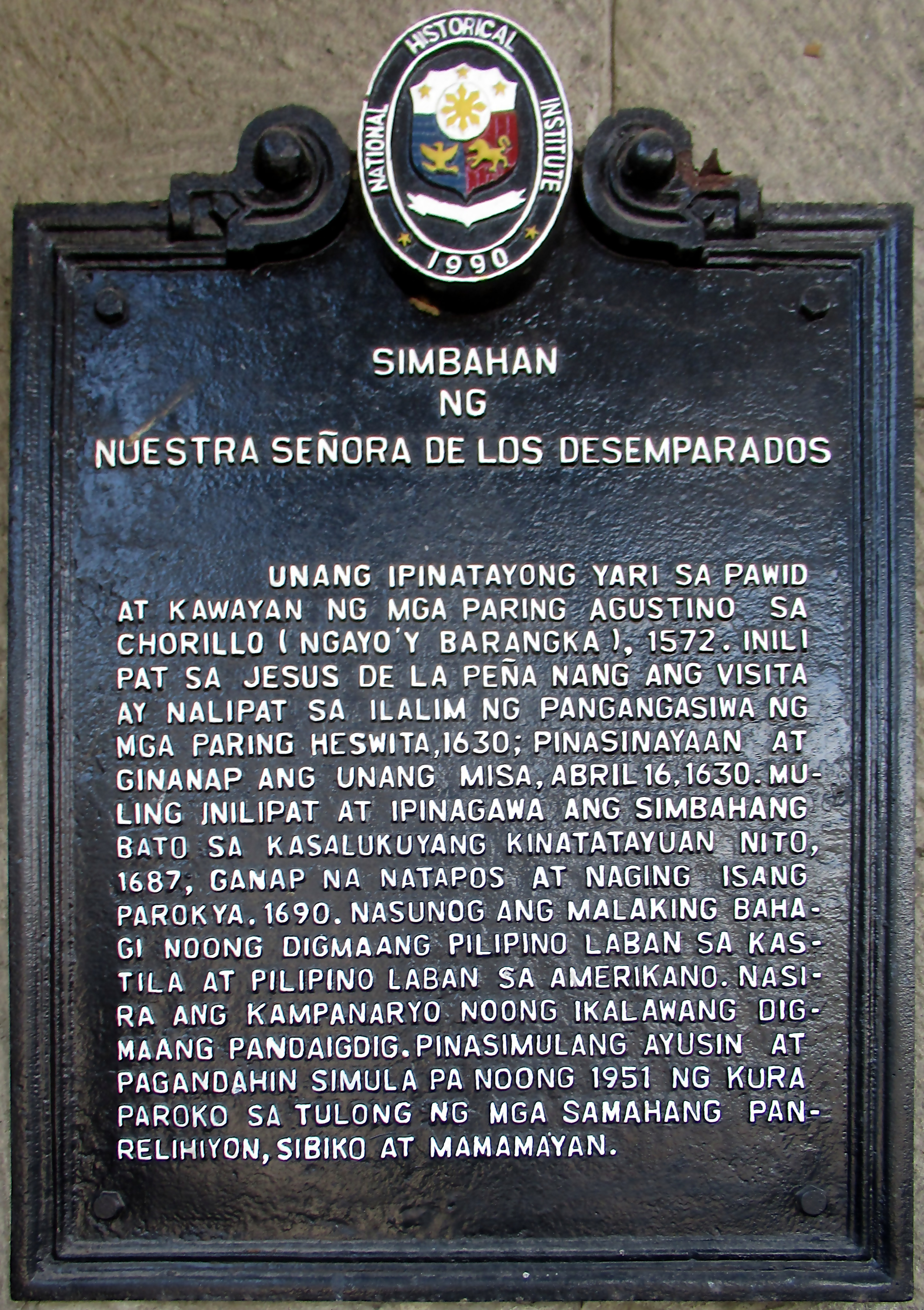
National Historical Institute marker installed in 1990

Catholicism in what is now Marikina began when the settlement was ceded to the Augustinians by the Jesuits. On March 10, 1687, Governor Gabriel Cruz Elasque ordered the transfer of Marikina to the oversight of the Augustinians and merged with the ministry of San Mateo. He instructed Don Juan Pimentel, the Mayor of Tondo, to vacate and demolish the visita of Jesús de la Peña as the Marikina River would flood the site during the rainy season. The visita could not accommodate the growing congregation, forcing the Augustinian friars to transfer operations across the Marikina to higher ground, where the much larger, present structure was built. The church was subsequently made an independent parish in 1690.

The church suffered major damages during the tumultuous years of the Philippine–American War in the early 1900s, that resulted in the loss of its records, and the carillion was totally destroyed during the Second World War. By 1957, OLA church was restored and refurbished by Father Silvestre dela Cruz of Archdiocese of Manila with the help from various religious and civic organisations.

On August 5, 2007, which is the Feast of the Dedication of the Basilica of St. Mary Major in Rome, the Bishop of Antipolo, Gabriel V. Reyes, consecrated the Parish Church of Our Lady of the Abandoned as a diocesan shrine in honor of Our Lady under the title Maria, Inang Mapag-Ampon ng Marikina, Nuestra Señora de los Desamparados. On September 8, 2007, a little more than a month after the dedication of the church as a shrine, Bishop Francisco de Leon, who had been appointed by Pope Benedict XVI as Auxiliary Bishop of Antipolo, was assigned by the Bishop of Antipolo as Parish Priest of Our Lady of the Abandoned. Msgr. Mariano Balbago Jr. relinquished the title of parish priest, but was appointed Rector and Parish Administrator, assisting Bishop De Leon in his duties. Upon the departure of Msgr. Balbago from the shrine and parish, Bishop De Leon was also appointed rector by the Bishop of Antipolo, but this time assisted by vice rector and parish administrator Fr. Reynante U. Tolentino.

== Architecture ==
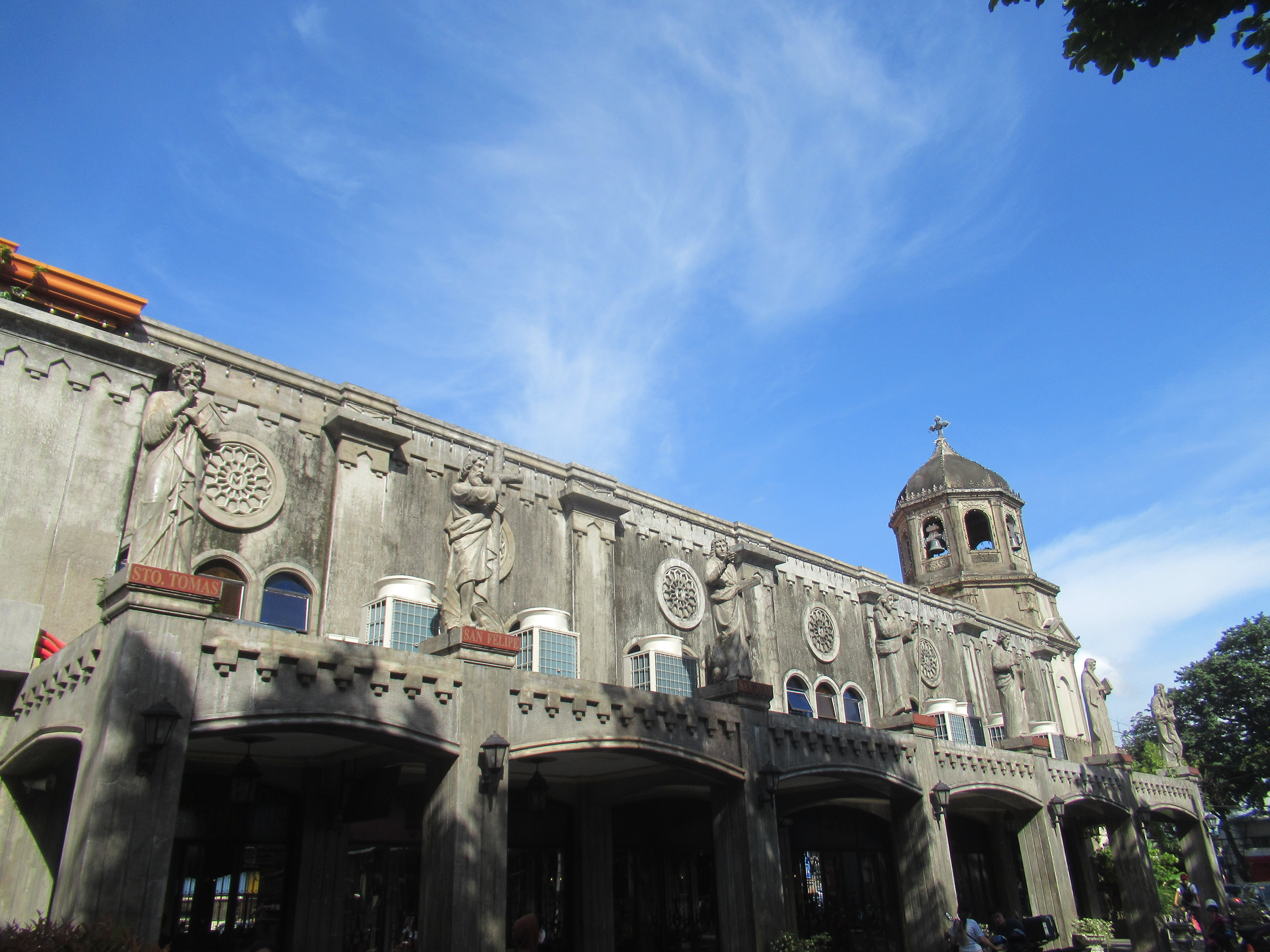
Statues of The Apostles at the top of the pillars around the side of the church

The church was first constructed from bamboo and leaves by the Augustinian friars in a place called Chorillo (present-day Barangka) on 1572. On 1687, the real construction began in its present location to stabilize an ecclesiastical jurisdiction over the area. Constructed in Baroque style, it is characterized by a heavily fortified facade, large-scale ceiling paintings, a dramatic central projection of the facade, a round-style pediment for the bell tower and the opulent blending of painting and architecture.

== Venerated Marian image ==
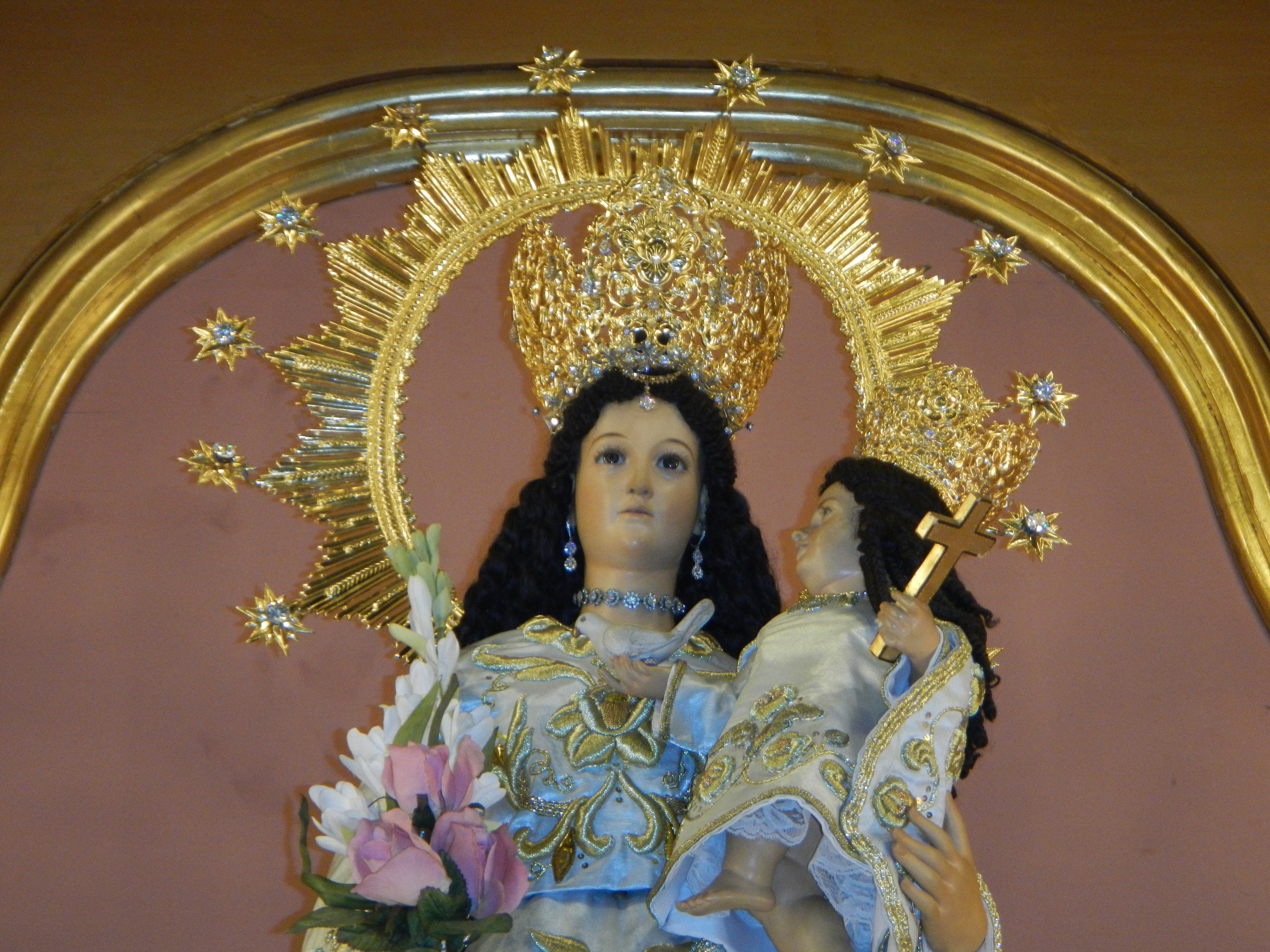
The original image of Virgen de los Desamparados de Marikina

On October 23, 1791, the church was consecrated by the Archdiocese of Manila for the Virgin's said title so that it could not be used for any secular purpose. In 1898, during the Philippine–American War, the first image was burnt along with pertinent records of the devotion in Marikina. In 1902, a new image was created, and is the one presently venerated in the parish.

The community initially approached the Apostolic Nuncio to petition for the Canonical Coronation of the image; however, the petition was declined due to few supporting documents. Meanwhile, then Bishop of Antipolo Crisostomo Yalung honored the Patrona with an Episcopal Coronation to remember the 100th Anniversary of the venerated image. The celebration was held on May 12, 2002, wherein the coronation was facilitated by President Gloria Macapagal-Arroyo.

Pope Benedict XVI granted the venerated image a decree of canonical coronation on April 22, 2005, one of his first formal institutional acts as a pope. The coronation would later take place the following October 23. Former Archbishop of Manila, Gaudencio Rosales presided over the Mass and canonical rites together with the Antipolo Bishop, Gabriel V. Reyes.

On December 8, 2024 a formal document between the Roman Catholic Diocese of Antipolo and donor of the said image was signed stating that the afermentioned image was to be given back to the said donor by the orders of father Lamberto S. Ramos (Parish Priest) and by the approval of His Excellency, Bishop Ruperto Santos, D.D., Bishop of Antipolo, and the news was later on revealed to the laity June 6, 2025. The image was taken home just 3 days later on June 9. On August 5, 2025, the new image which was patterned after the Valencian image was solemnly enthroned and blessed by His Excellency, Most Reverend Francisco Mendoza de Leon, Emeritus Bishop of Antipolo.

== Shrine rectors ==
Name	Years serving	Assignment
Mariano T. Balbago Jr.	2007 – 2009	Rector and Parish Administrator
Francisco M. de Leon	2009 – 2016	Rector and Parish Priest
Reynante U. Tolentino	2009 – 2016	Vice-Rector and Parish Administrator
Reynante U. Tolentino	2016 – 2017	Acting Rector and Parish Priest
Pedro C. Cañonero	2017 – 2019	Shrine Rector and Parish Priest
Nolly C. Buco	2019 – 2024	Parish Priest
Francisco Louie M. Deang Jr.	2019 – 2021	Shrine Rector and Parish Administrator
Lamberto S. Ramos	2021 – 2024	Shrine Rector and Parish Administrator
Lamberto S. Ramos	2025 – present	Shrine Rector and Parish Priest

Assisting in the Pastoral Team of the parish are as follows:

- Mark Anthony Ferrer
- Casiano Anthony Cotiamco

== Gallery ==
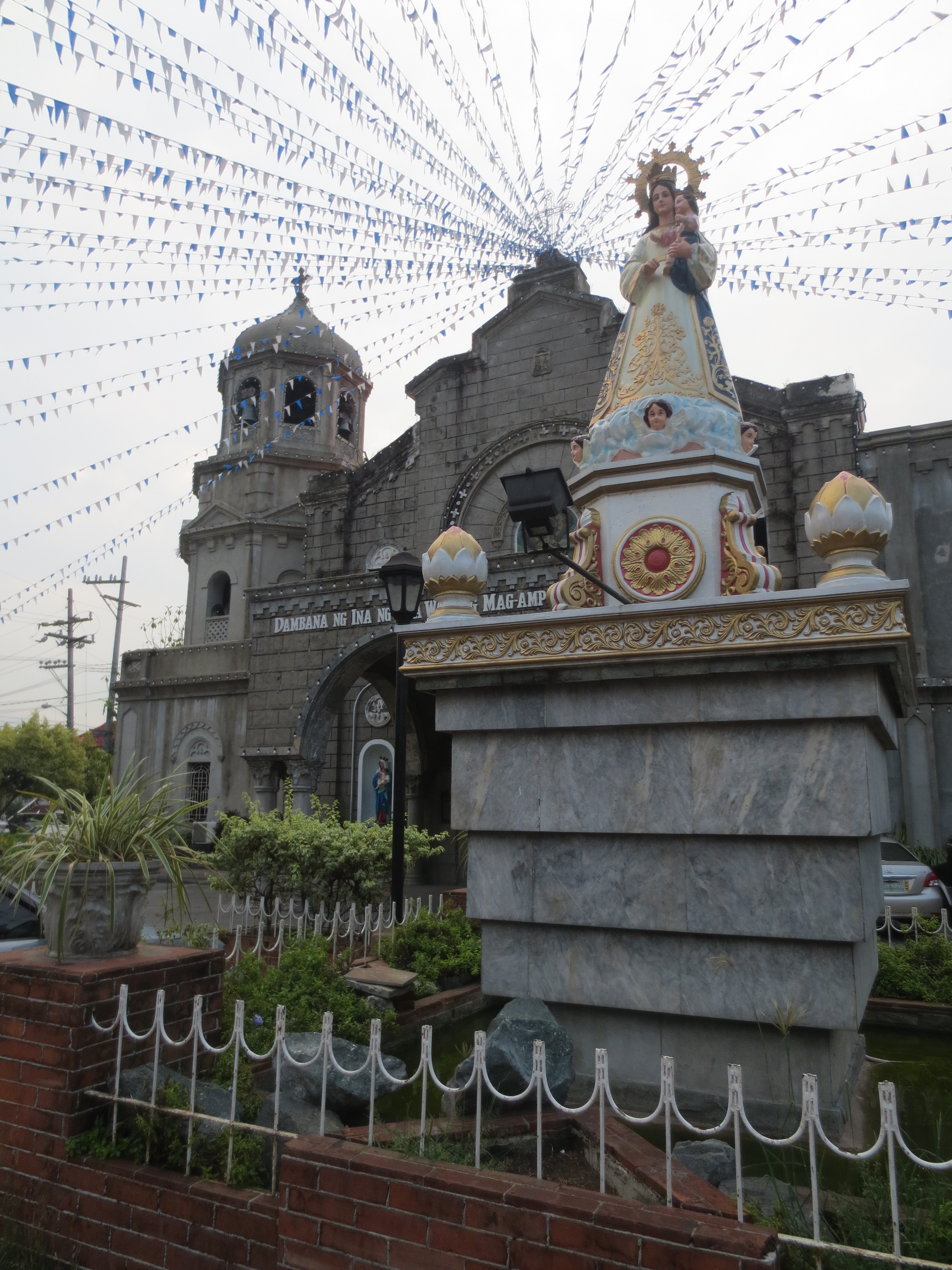
Nuestra Señora de los Desamparados fronting the church

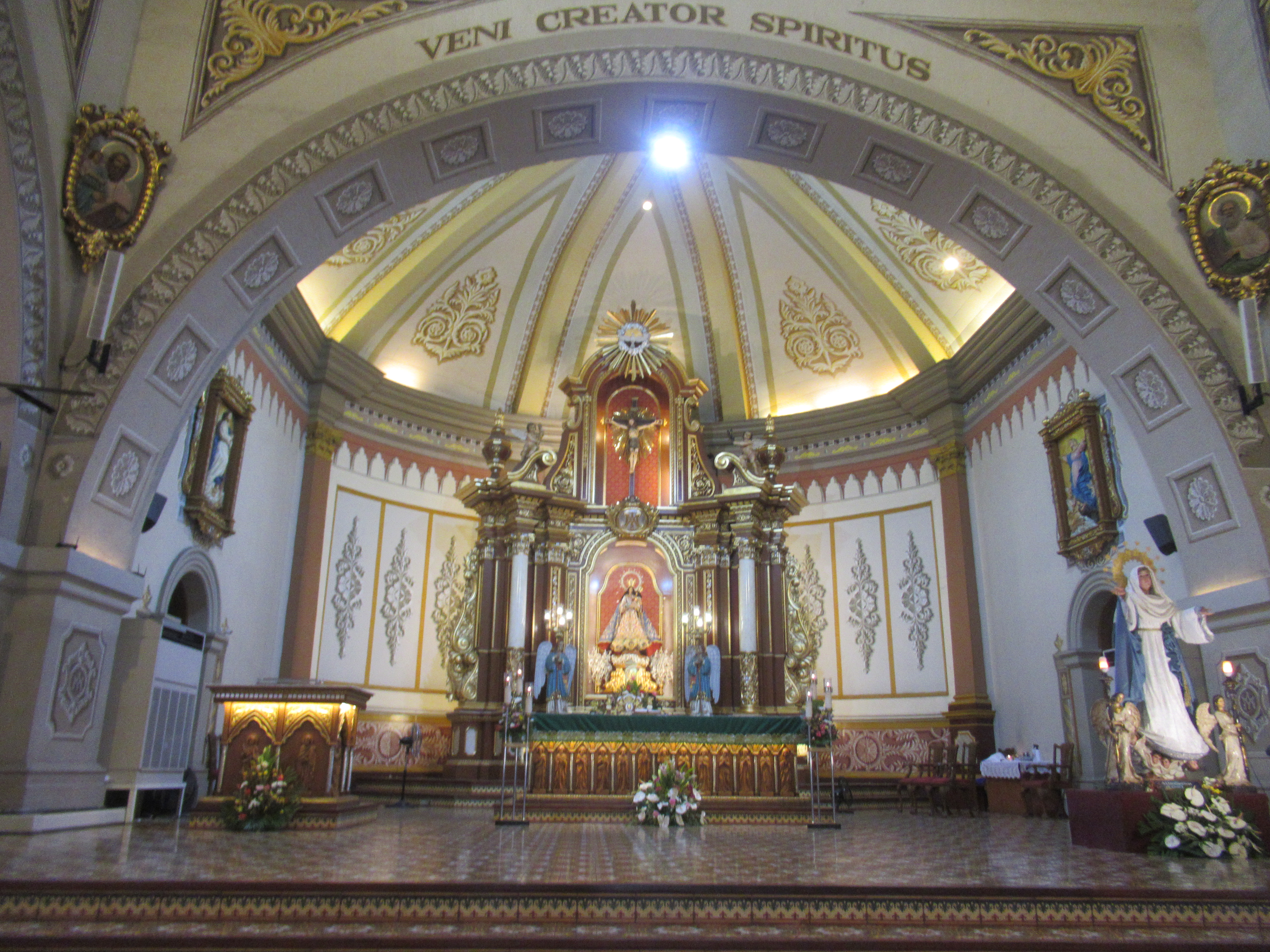
Sanctuary

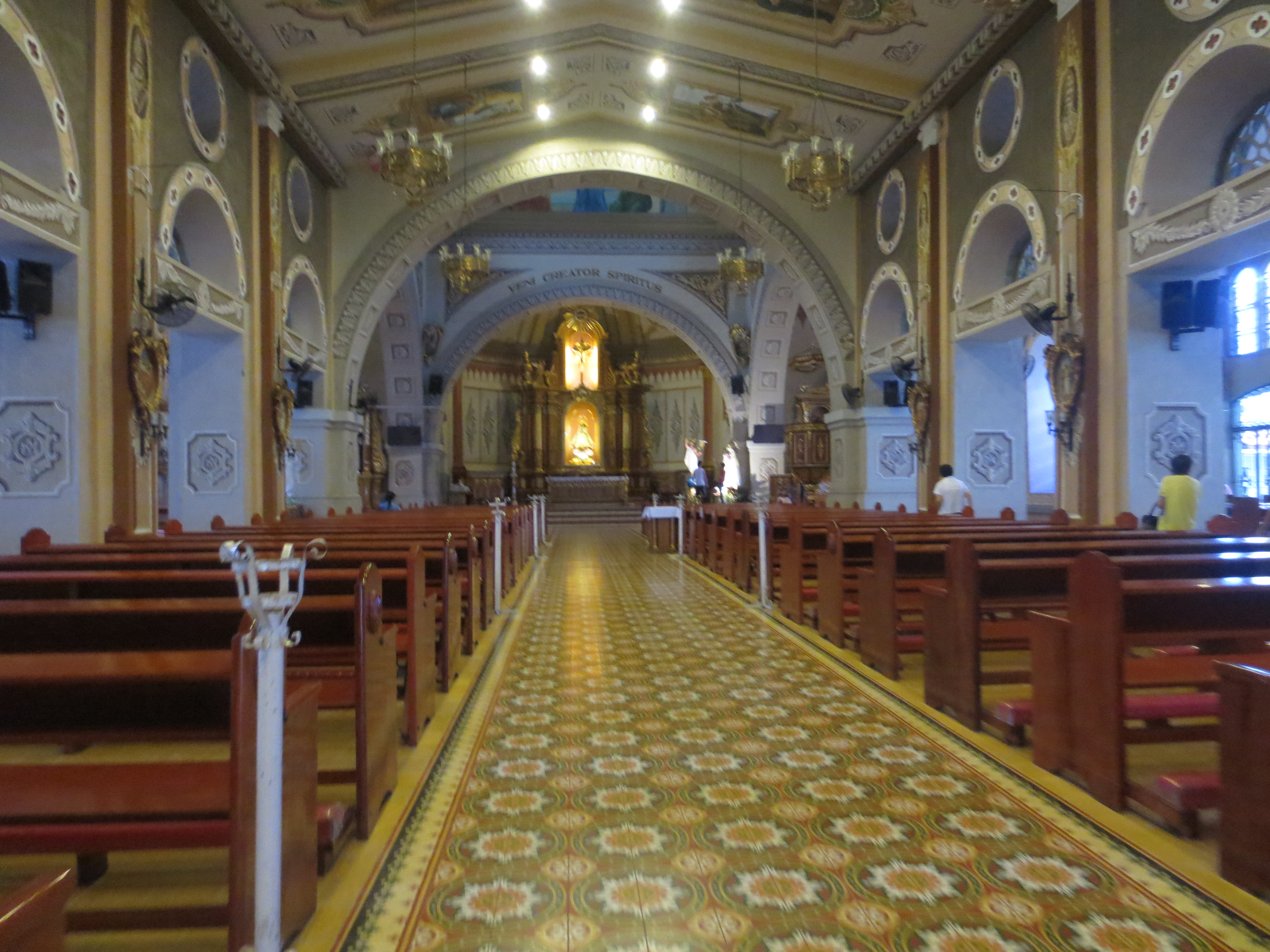
Church interior in 2014

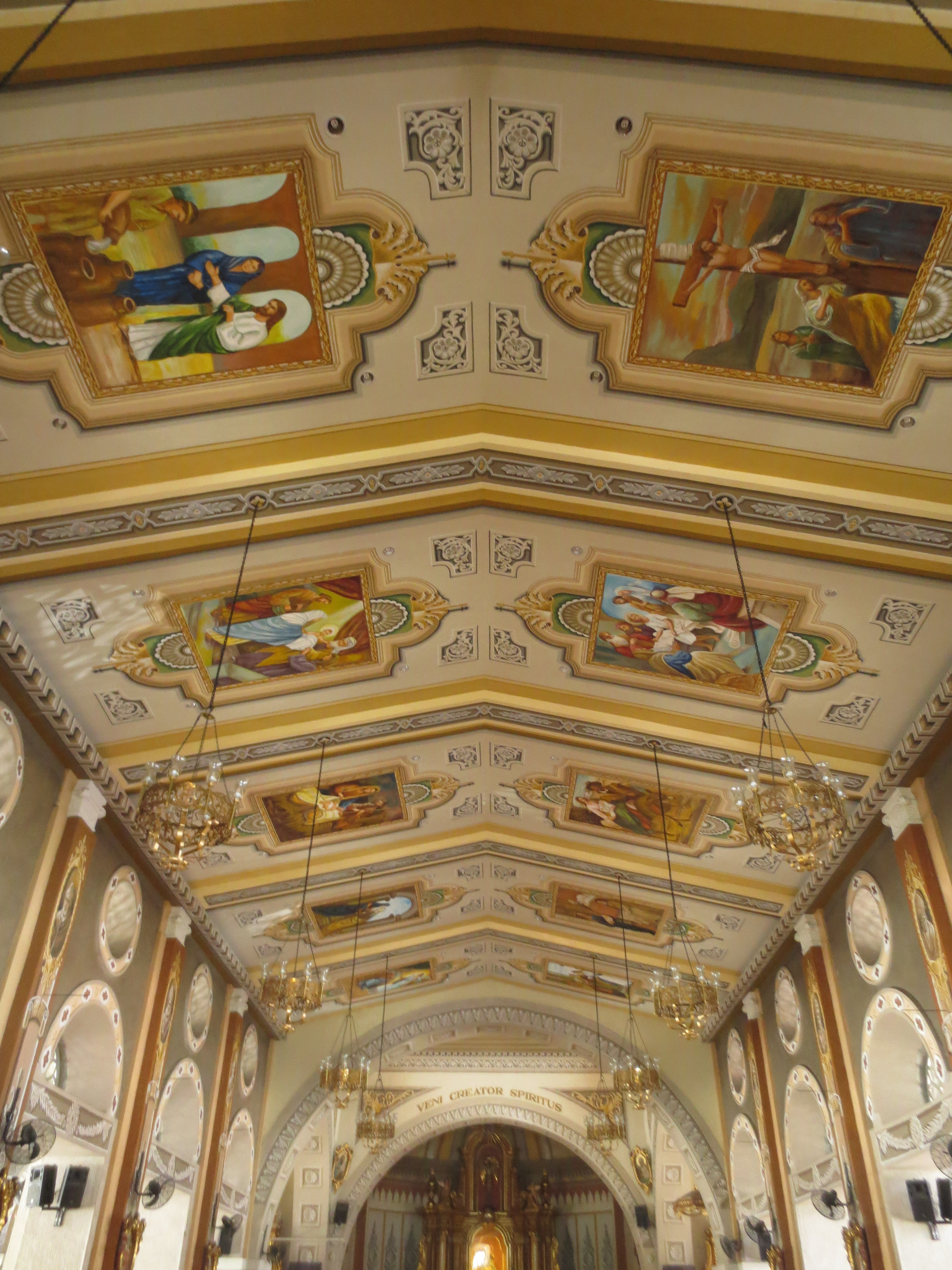
The church ceiling is painted with various images of Jesus' ministry according to the Bible.

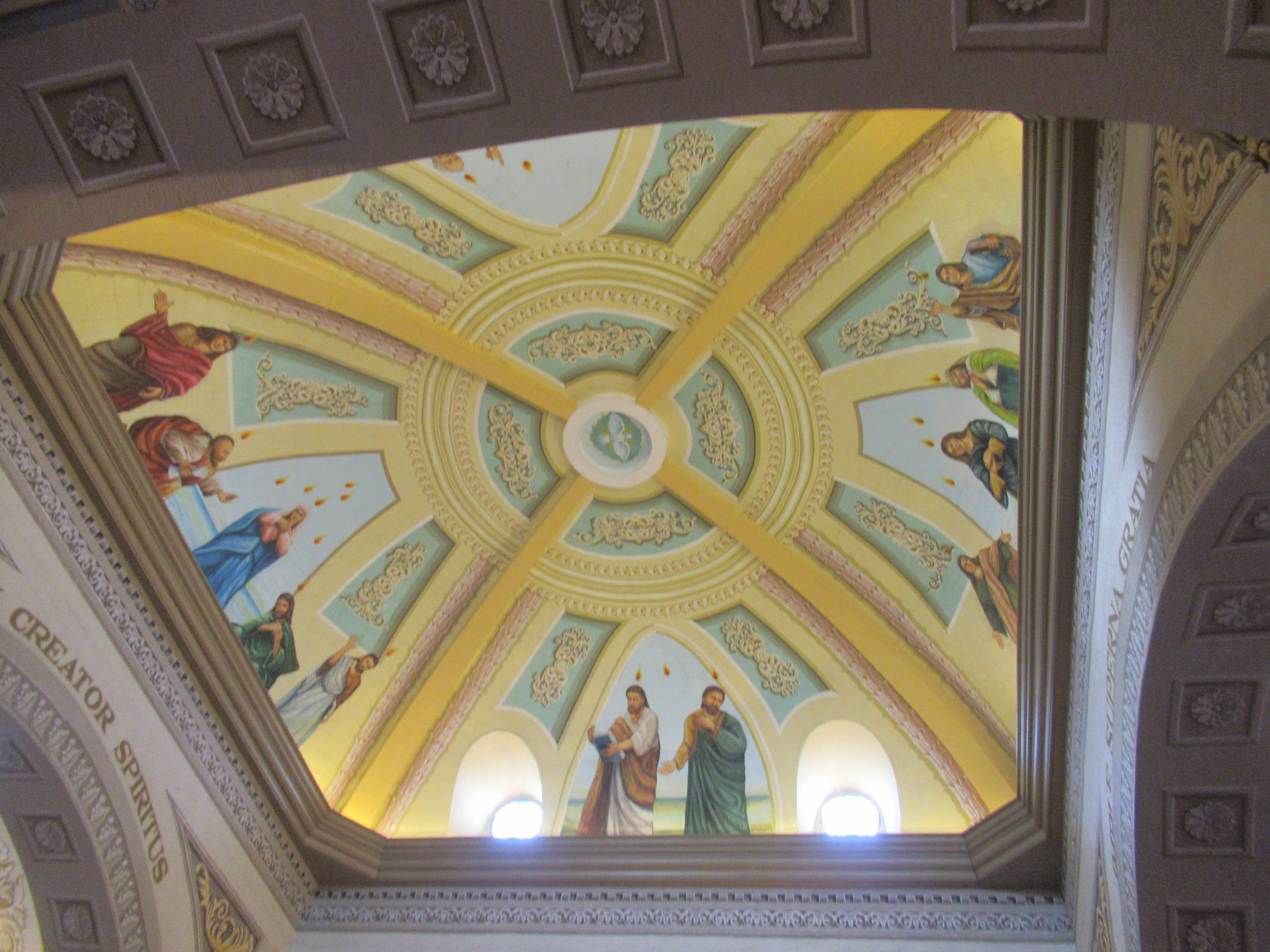
Main dome interior painting depicting the Descent of the Holy Spirit as tongues of fire which settled over the heads of Jesus' disciples

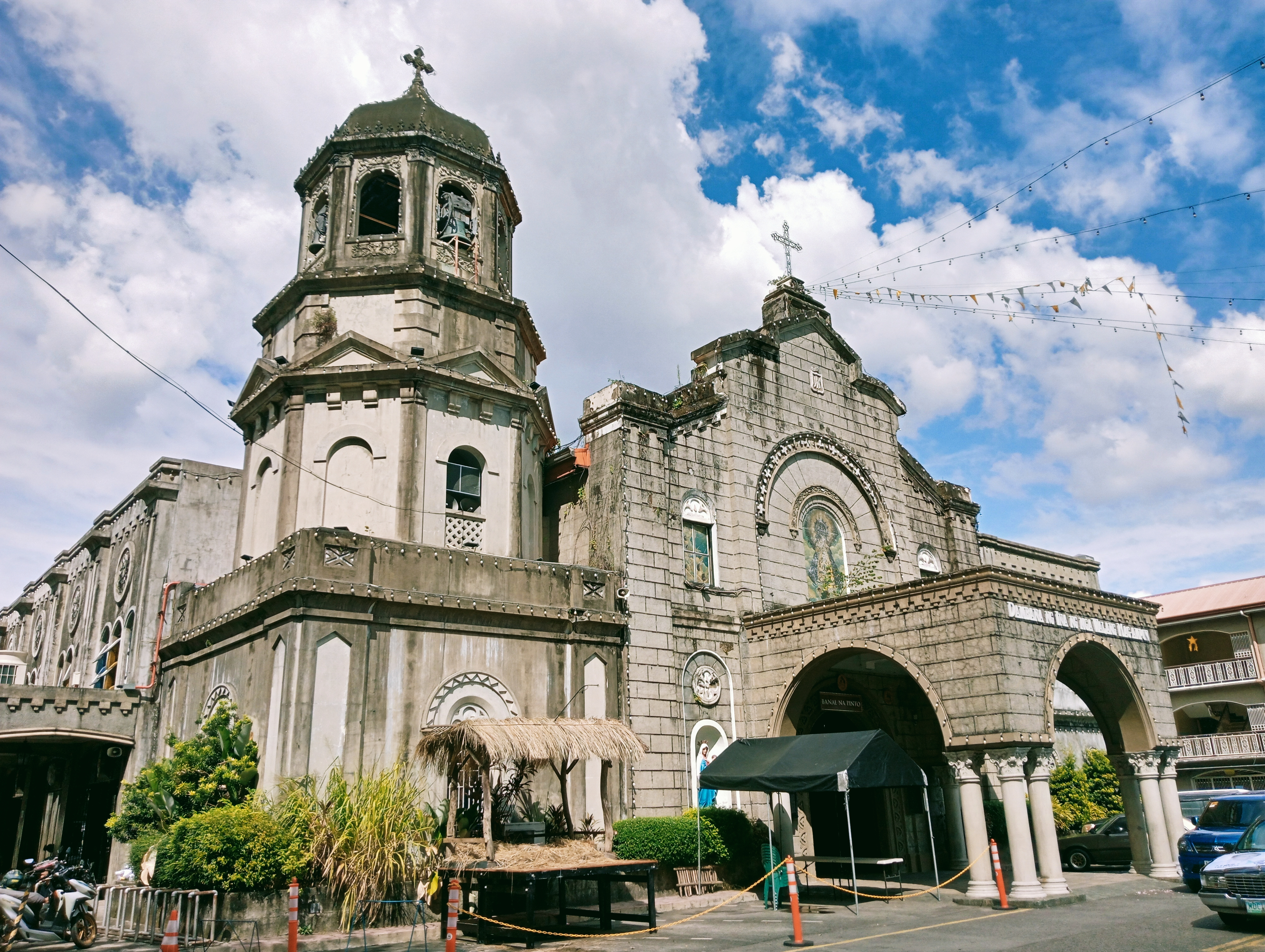
Church bell tower and portico in December 2023

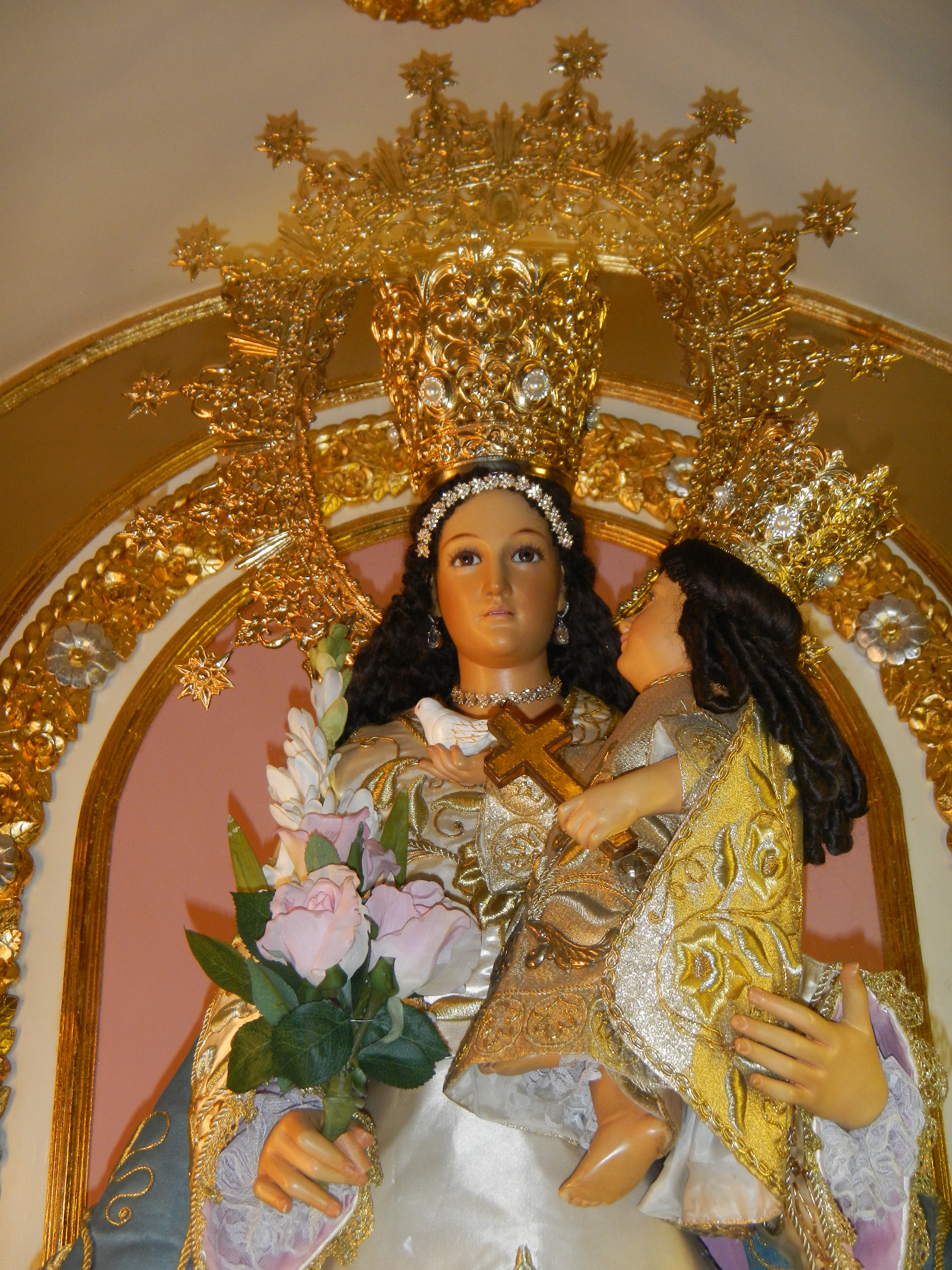
The official pilgrim image of Nuestra Señora de los Desamparados de Marikina

== See also ==
- Jesus dela Peña Chapel
- Virgen de los Desamparados
