= Oscar Cruz =

Filipino prelate of the Catholic Church (1934–2020)

The Most Reverend Oscar Valero Cruz D.D., J.C.D.
- Metropolitan Archbishop Emeritus of Lingayen–Dagupan
- Church: Catholic Church
- Archdiocese: Lingayen–Dagupan
- Appointed: July 15, 1991
- Installed: August 24, 1991
- Retired: November 4, 2009
- Predecessor: Federico Guba Limon
- Successor: Socrates B. Villegas
- Previous posts: Titular Bishop of Martirano (1976‍–‍1978); Auxiliary Bishop of Manila (1976‍–‍1978); Archbishop of San Fernando (1978‍–‍1988)

Personal details
- Born: November 17, 1934 Balanga, Bataan, Philippine Islands
- Died: August 26, 2020 (aged 85) San Juan, Metro Manila, Philippines
- Buried: Santuario de San Juan Evangelista, Dagupan City, Pangasinan, Philippines
- Education: University of Santo Tomas; Lateran University
- Motto: Iustitia Custodit Innocentis Viam (Latin for 'Justice guards the way of the innocent'; Proverbs 13:16)
- Coat of arms: Oscar Valero Cruz's coat of arms

Ordination history
History
Priestly ordination
- Date: February 10, 1962
Episcopal consecration
- Principal consecrator: Bruno Torpigliani
- Co-consecrators: Jaime Lachica Sin; Artemio Gabriel Casas
- Date: May 3, 1976
- Place: Manila Cathedral

Oscar Valero Cruz (November 17, 1934 – August 26, 2020) was a Filipino prelate of the Catholic Church in the Philippines. He was the Archbishop of Lingayen–Dagupan in Pangasinan, Philippines, from 1991 until his retirement in 2009.

== Biography ==
Oscar Cruz was born on November 17, 1934, in Balanga, Bataan, Philippines. He received his seminary training at the University of Santo Tomas Central Seminary, and further theology studies at the Lateran University.

His priestly ordination was on February 8, 1962, and his episcopal consecration on May 3, 1976. He was the first Filipino rector of San Carlos Seminary of the Archdiocese of Manila from 1973 to 1978. He was an auxiliary bishop of Manila (1976–1978) and archbishop of the Archdiocese of San Fernando (1978–1988). He served as a judicial vicar of the Catholic Bishops' Conference of the Philippines (CBCP) National Tribunal of Appeals, and director of the CBCP Legal Office. He was appointed Archbishop of Lingayen-Dagupan on July 15, 1991.

Cruz published many books, including CBCP Guidelines on Sexual Abuse and Misconduct: A Critique, and Call of the Laity.

Cruz was elected President of the Federation of Asian Bishops' Conferences and served from 1993–2000.

== Controversy ==
Manila RTC, Branch 52 Judge Antonio Rosales on May 14, 2008, issued the warrant of arrest, granted the P10,000 bail motion, and Archbishop Oscar V. Cruz posted bail. Libel cases were filed against him after he accused the Philippine Amusement and Gaming Corp. (PAGCOR) of using female staff to act like "guest relations officers (GROs)" during the 2004 birthday celebration of First Gentleman Jose Miguel Arroyo. His arraignment was set on June 17.

== Retirement ==
On September 8, 2009, Pope Benedict XVI accepted the retirement of Archbishop Cruz and was effective on November 4, 2009 where he was succeeded by Socrates Villegas of the Diocese of Balanga.

== Death ==
Cruz died from complications of multiple organ failure caused by COVID-19 on August 26, 2020, at age 85 during the COVID-19 pandemic in the Philippines.

== See also ==
- List of Filipino bishops

Academic offices
New title	Rector of San Carlos Seminary; 1978–1980	Succeeded by Protacio Gungon
Catholic Church titles
Preceded by Emilio Abera Cinense	Archbishop of San Fernando; May 22, 1978 – October 24, 1988	Succeeded by Paciano Aniceto
Preceded by Federico G. Limon	Archbishop of Lingayen–Dagupan; August 24, 1991 – November 4, 2009	Succeeded by Socrates B. Villegas
Preceded by Carmelo Dominador Flores Morelos	CBCP President; December 1, 1995 – November 30, 1999	Succeeded by Orlando Quevedo
