= San Carlos Seminary =

Roman Catholic archdiocesan seminary in Makati, Philippines

The Royal and Conciliar San Carlos Seminary
- Seminaryo ng San Carlos (Filipino)
- Latin: Seminarium Sancti Caroli
- Motto: Humilitas
- Motto in English: Humility
- Type: Seminary
- Established: April 28, 1702; 324 years ago
- Affiliations: Archdiocese of Manila
- Rector: Rolando Garcia Jr.
- Dean: Jose Joel Jason (Configuration Stage) and Ryan Jemomar Belono-ac (Discipleship Stage)
- Director: Leo Angelo Ignacio (Configuration Stage), Jaime Vidal Zuñiga (Discipleship Stage), Joselito Buenafe (Pastoral-Spiritual Integration Year)
- Procurator: Joselito Buenafe
- Location: Makati, Philippines; 14°33′50″N 121°02′34″E
- Patron Saint: Charles Borromeo, Patron of Seminaries
- Colours: Red and blue
- Nickname: SCS
- Website: scs.edu.ph
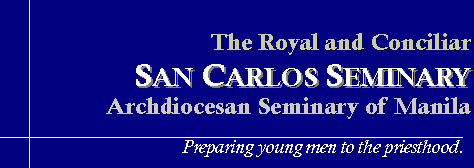

- Location in Metro Manila Location in Luzon Location in the Philippines
- The first diocesan seminary in the Philippines

The Royal and Conciliar San Carlos Seminary is the archdiocesan seminary of Manila. It was established in the year 1702, by decree of King Philip V of Spain. At present, the institution houses seminarians belonging to various dioceses in Luzon, particularly from the Metro Manila region.

== History ==
A devotional grotto of Our Lady of Lourdes on the campus of San Carlos Seminary, Guadalupe Viejo, Makati

San Carlos Seminary was the first diocesan seminary established in the Philippines. In 1562, the Council of Trent decreed that every bishop must establish a center of clerical education and training for his diocese.

In 1581, Domingo de Salazar, OP, the first Bishop of Manila, decreed the establishment of a seminary to prepare native men for the priesthood and ecclesiastical dignities. Despite several attempts, his dream crystallized 125 years later as both Church and State did what the poverty of the colony and other adverse circumstances would afford. Several colleges where ecclesiastical and religious native vocations might be fostered were founded in the early 17th century: the Jesuits' Colegio de San José (1601), Colegio de Santo Tomás (1611) of the Dominicans, Colegio de San Juan de Letrán and Colegio de San Pedro y San Pablo (1632). Although these various schools trained future priests, a unified diocesan seminary was lacking.

=== Early centuries in Manila ===
In 1592, King Philip II of Spain enjoined that the pertinent decree of Trent be implemented in the Indies. He ordered all archbishops and bishops of the Indies to found and support seminaries decreed by the Council of Trent for the formation of native clergy.

Since the Philippines was then under the Patronato Real system, on April 28, 1702, King Philip V of Spain ordered the establishment of a seminary in Manila for eight seminarians. However, this plan was modified by Giovanni Battista Sidoti, an Italian priest accompanying Archbishop Charles Thomas Maillard de Tournon, papal legate to Peking, on the way to China. He worked for the erection in Manila of an Asian regional seminary for seventy-two seminarians of the Far East, with the approval of Archbishop Diego Camacho y Ávila. The seminary was named Real Colegio Seminario de San Clemente in honour of Pope Clement XI. Having learned of the development, the King ordered the closure and demolition of the seminary building, the execution of his original plan, and the transfer of Archbishop Camacho to Mexico.

From 1702 to 1730, seminarians took their courses of philosophy and theology at the Colegio de San José and Colegio de Santo Tomás. The number of seminarians increased several times.

On December 8, 1707, Archbishop Francisco de la Cuesta, Camacho's successor, opened the seminary. In 1715, he renamed the institution to Real Seminario de San Felipe after the King's patron saint. It was located in front of the Archbishop's Palace in Intramuros.

In 1728, Archbishop Carlos Bermúdez de Castro had a dispute with the Governor-General over his right to nominate professors at San Felipe. He argued that the seminary was an ecclesiastical institution to be administered by the archbishop in conformity with the decrees of the Council of Trent and the laws of the Indies. His successor, Archbishop Juan Ángel Rodríguez, continued de Castro's fight over the archbishop's right to guide the seminary. However, civil authorities rebuffed them under the pretext of the Patronato Real.

The impetus for a review of how the Patronato Real administered the seminary came when Bishop Miguel Lino de Espeleta of Cebu became Acting Governor-General of the Philippines from 1759 to 1761. He insisted that the royal treasury pay its obligations to the seminary which amounted to 54,000 pesos from 1705 to 1759. The royal treasury had committed 1,200 pesos for the yearly maintenance of the seminary. Hence, during the fifty-four years of the seminary, the royal contribution to the seminary averaged only 200 pesos a year.

The British Invasion in 1762 dispersed the seminarians. It was only on January 25, 1768, that the seminary was re-opened by Archbishop Basílio Sancho de Santa Justa y Rufina, naming it Colegio Seminario Ecclesiástico de Manila. It was placed under the royal patronage of King Charles II. On November 16, 1778, the King ordered a visitation of the seminary. As a result, reforms were instituted, and the magnificent buildings of the expelled Jesuits, the Church and Colegio de San Ignacio were assigned to the diocesan seminary. For some thirty years (1784–1817), the Colegio de San José and the diocesan seminary, which began to be called in 1786 as Real Seminario Conciliar de San Carlos in honour of the King, existed side-by-side. San Carlos was located from 1784 to 1880 on Calle Real de Palacio (now General Luna Street) and Calle Escuela (now Victoria Street).

The Vincentian Fathers took charge over the seminary on August 2, 1862, under the patronage of Queen Isabella II and with the support of Archbishop Gregorio Melitón Martínez de Santa Cruz. Rev. Fr. Gregorio Velasco, CM became the first Vincentian Rector of the conciliar seminary.

Earthquakes in 1852, 1863, and 1880 damaged the Church of San Ignacio and the seminary building itself. Following the last earthquake, the Vincentians temporarily moved their charges to their Casa del Ocampo at 959 Calle San Marcelino (1880–1883).

In 1883, Archbishop Pedro Payo, O.P constructed a new seminary building between the new Jesuit church of San Ignacio and the Archbishop's property on Calle Arzobispo. The building was rented in 1925 by Ateneo de Manila and was called Patio de San Javier. At present, it is the quarters for the employees of the Intramuros guest house of the archdiocese.

In 1897, the seminary moved to a new building built under the direction of Archbishop Bernardino Nozaleda. It occupied a whole block bordered by Beaterio, Anda, and Real de Palacio (now General Luna) Streets. The seminary stayed in this building for only a year (1897–1898). With the outbreak of the Philippine Revolution, the archbishop ordered its closure. The building, for a while leased by the Americans, became known as Saint Paul's Hospital, under the charge of Saint Paul de Chartres Sisters and later the Maryknoll Sisters.

Between the years 1900–1911, the seminary existed in an old building along Calle Arzobispo beside the new San Ignacio Church. On May 20, 1905, the administration of the seminary was turned over by the American Archbishop Jeremiah Harty to the Jesuits. This arrangement under the Jesuits lasted for only six years until August 17, 1911. In the next two years, San Carlos was fused with Seminario de San Javier (the name given by the Jesuits, upon their return to the Philippines, to Colegio de San José) on Padre Faura Street in Ermita. The few seminarians then went to San Javier for their studies until 1913, when San Javier was closed.

=== Years in Mandaluyong ===
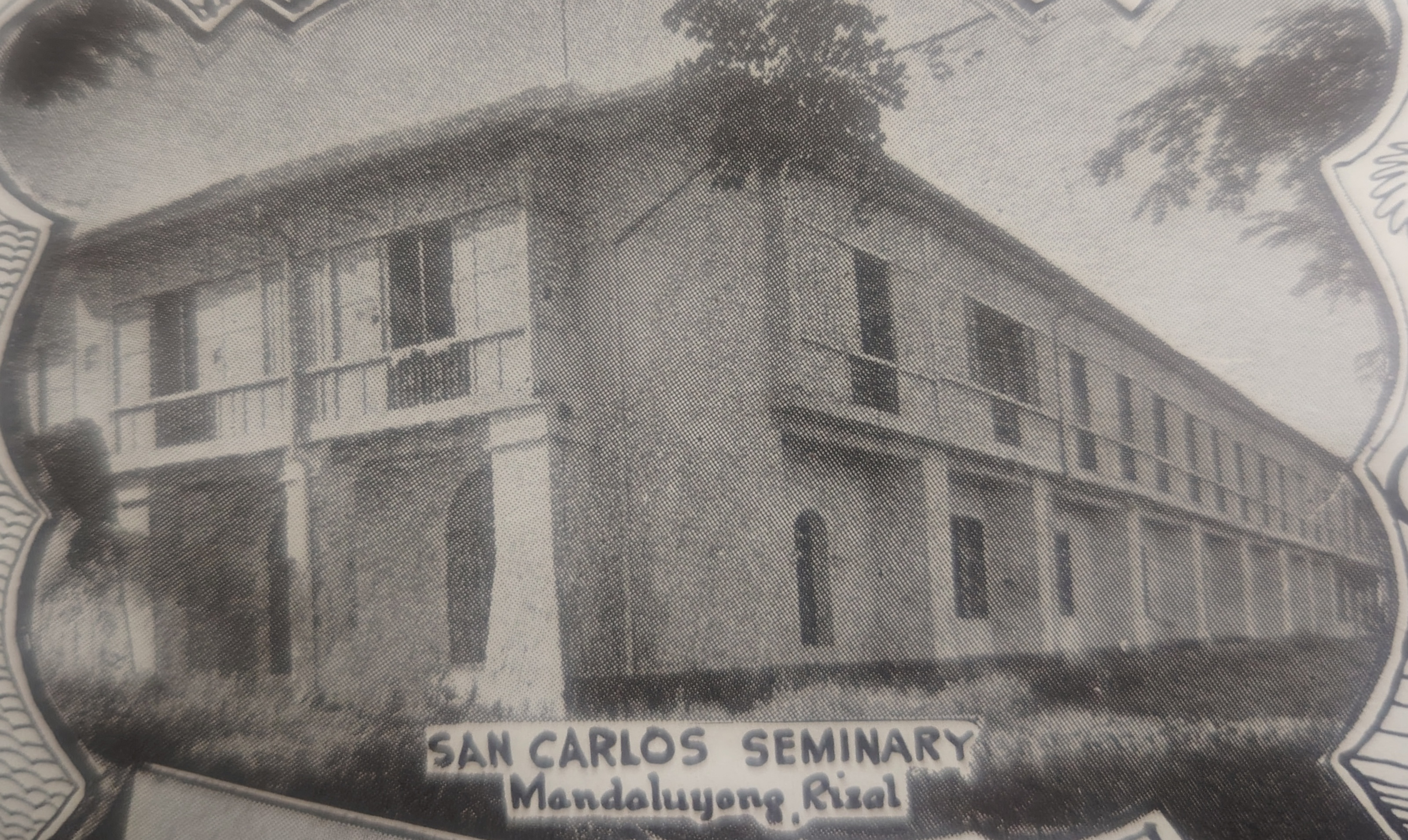
San Carlos Seminary, then located in Mandaluyong, in 1940

For economic reasons, on May 19, 1913, Harty decided to transfer seminarians to the former Asilo de Mandaloya, which was constructed by the Augustinians in 1716 and had been abandoned since around 1900. In June 1913, the Vincentians were again put in charge of the seminary. The seminary's name in honor of San Carlos Borromeo was by then definite.

In 1927, to separate the major seminarians from the minor seminarians, San Carlos was again housed at Casa de Ocampo along San Marcelino Street in Manila. In 1936, due to the construction of a new building along San Marcelino, the major seminarians joined the minor seminarians in Mandaluyong. In the ensuing years, San Carlos Seminary returned to San Marcelino Street in the newly built Vincentian Central House. In 1941, the major and minor seminarians were reunited in Mandaluyong, which was closed that December at the outbreak of the Second World War. It reopened in 1946, but the issue of a large number of enrolees needed action in the postwar era.

=== Move to Makati ===
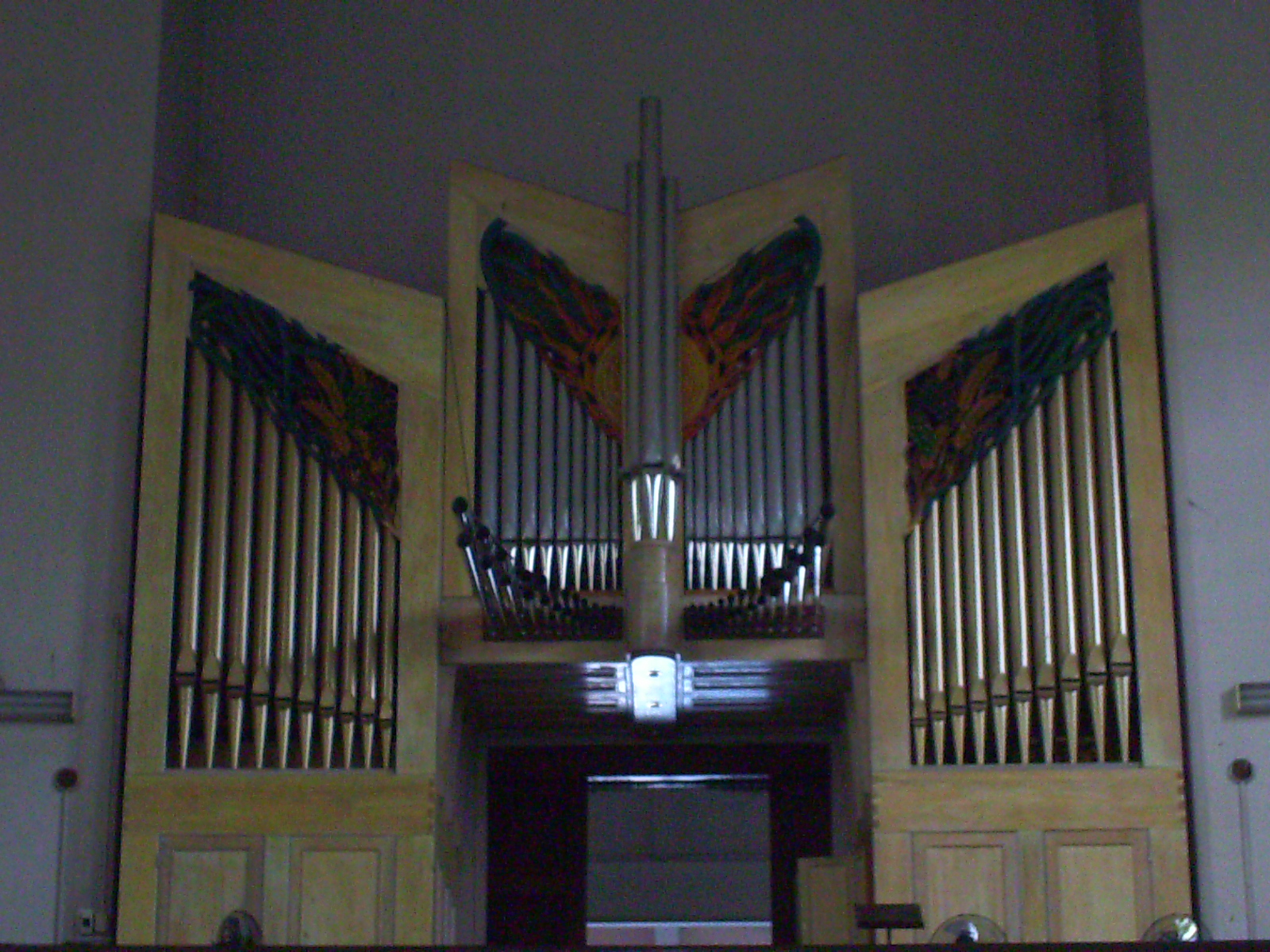
The Pipe Organ of the Main Chapel of San Carlos Seminary

In 1916, Harty was succeeded by Archbishop Michael O'Doherty, who reigned until 1949. His successor, Archbishop of Cebu Gabriel M. Reyes, and the first native Filipino Archbishop of Manila, had planned and ordered the construction of a new campus in Makati to accommodate the huge number of students. In 1951, he blessed the cornerstone for the new building of San Carlos Seminary in Guadalupe Viejo village along Highway 54 (now Epifanio de los Santos Avenue or EDSA). On January 24, 1953, Cardinal Norman Thomas Gilroy, Archbishop of Sydney and papal legate to the First Plenary Council of the Philippines, blessed the new building.

The Manila seminarians and professors transferred from Mandaluyong to the Makati site to begin the school year 1953–1954. The new seminary building housed both major and minor seminarians of the Archdiocese of Manila (which then also covered Rizal, Cavite and Bulacan and Laguna). The right wing was occupied by minor seminarians and the left wing by major seminarians. In the middle of the building is the common chapel, and in the basement, the refectory.

In 1951, the Congregation of the Immaculate Heart of Mary (CICM, known as the Belgian or Scheut Fathers) had been tasked by Rome with the formation of seminarians in Lipa, where Bishop Rufino J. Santos (later Archbishop of Manila in 1953 and the first Filipino cardinal in 1960) was the diocesan administrator. On June 10, 1953, it was announced that the CICM Fathers would take over San Carlos Seminary from the Vincentians, and so the major seminarians in Lipa were transferred to Makati on June 15 and 16. On June 25, the new school year began with a Mass of the Holy Spirit.

In 1955, the minor seminarians were then separated from the Philosophy and Theology departments and transferred to the newly erected Our Lady of Guadalupe Minor Seminary, which was blessed on August 22, 1955. It was located a block away from San Carlos Seminary in the direction of the Pasig River, near the present day Guadalupe MRT station. In 1973, Cardinal Santos turned over the seminary administration from the CICM Fathers to the diocesan priests led by Oscar V. Cruz, who later became Auxiliary Bishop of Manila in 1976.

The construction of the new building of the San Carlos Graduate School of Theology and the Archbishop Gabriel M. Reyes Memorial Library began in 1985, and they were completed and blessed by Cardinal Sin and Cardinal Ricardo Vidal, Archbishop of Cebu, on June 29, 1987. In that same year, the two-winged edifice for the Holy Apostles Senior Seminary (HASS) and the San Lorenzo Ruiz Lay Formation Center (or LayForce) was constructed. The Lorenzo Mission Institute (LMI), aimed at forming priestly candidates for the missions to the Chinese communities was built in 1989. In 1990, Bahay-Pari, a house for priests, was put up for the ongoing formation, physical rest and spiritual rejuvenation for the Manila clergy. On March 13, 1995, the cornerstone of Holy Apostles Senior Seminary was laid to give way to the full-swing formation of the laity at the Layforce Building.

When Bishop of Imus Luis Antonio G. Tagle became Archbishop of Manila in 2011, he continued the vision of his predecessor Cardinal Rosales, to uplift and deepen the formation program of the seminarians through regular pastoral and theological updating and strengthening the seminary's thrust in human formation of the seminarians.

Some of the historic events that took place in San Carlos Seminary were the following: the Second Plenary Council of the Philippines (January 20 to February 17, 1991); the Sixth Plenary Assembly of the Federation of Asian Bishops' Conferences (January 10–19, 1995); the visit of Pope John Paul II (January 15, 1995); the National Pastoral Consultation on Church Renewal (January 20–27, 2001); and the Second National Rural Congress (July 7–8, 2008).

The seminary has produced men who have served for the mission of the church. San Carlos Seminary's alumni include the Gomburza priests, Mariano Gómez and Jacinto Zamora, who were executed by the Spanish government for supposed involvement in the 1872 Cavite Mutiny and inspired the Revolution; Cardinal Rufino Santos; and Cardinal Ricardo Vidal, Archbishop of Cebu.

The seminary is considered a national heritage structure, as it was designed by Juan Nakpil, National Artist for Architecture.

== Priest-formators of San Carlos Seminary ==
There are eleven priests of the Archdiocese of Manila that cater to the formation program of seminarians starting the School Year 2024-2025.

- Rolando Garcia Jr., Rector
- Joselito Buenafe, Vice Rector, Procurator, and Director, Pastoral-Spiritual Integration Year
- Leo Angelo Ignacio, Director, Theology Department (Configuration Stage)
- Jaime Vidal Zuñiga, Director, Philosophy Department (Discipleship Stage)
- Carlo Magno Marcelo, Director, Pre-College Department (Propaedeutic Stage)
- Jose Joel Jason, Academic Dean, San Carlos Graduate School of Theology
- Ryan Jamemar Belono-ac, Academic Dean, Philosophy Department
- Joseph Don Zaldivar, Spiritual Director of Philosophy Department, Admissions Director and Human Formation Director
- Emerico Sixto Juan Garcia, Spiritual Director of Theology Department
- Celestino Pascual, Resident Confessor
- Eugene David, Spiritual Director

== Seminary Rectors ==
Rectors of San Carlos Seminary Since 1862
| Name | Year |
|---|---|
| Rev. Fr. Gregorio Velasco, CM | 1862-1870 |
| Rev. Fr. Diego Salmeron, CM | 1870-1874 |
| Rev. Fr Manuel Orriols, CM | 1875-1890 |
| Rev. Fr. Rafael de la Iglesia, CM | 1894-1899 |
| Rev. Fr. Jose Sabater | 1900-1903 |
| Rev. Msgr. Jose Ma. Changco | 1904-1905 |
| Rev. Fr. Joaquin Villalonga, SJ | 1905 |
| Rev. Fr. Pio Pi, SJ | 1905-1911 |
| Rev. Fr. Gregorio Tabar, CM | 1913-1917 |
| Rev. Fr. Aurelio Fernandez, CM | 1917-1927 |
| Rev. Fr. Jacinto Villalain, CM | ca. 1929-ca. 1938 |
| Rev. Fr. Zacarias Subiñas, CM | ca. 1941-1945 |
| Rev. Fr. Maximo Juguera, CM | ca. 1945-1953 |
| Rev. Msgr. Josef Billiet, CICM | 1953-1964 |
| Rev. Fr. Gerard Linssen, CICM | 1964-1967 |
| Rev. Fr. Albert Meersschaert, CICM | 1967-1972 |
| Rev. Fr. Leo Vandromme, CICM | 1972-1974 |
| Most Rev. Oscar Cruz, DD | 1973-1978 |
| Most Rev. Protacio Gungon, DD | 1978-1980 |
| Most Rev. Gaudencio Rosales, DD | 1980-1982 |
| Rev. Fr. Ramon Arguelles | 1982-1986 |
| Rev. Fr. Francisco de Leon | 1986-1991; 1998-2001 |
| Most Rev. Crisostomo Yalung, DD | 1991-1994 |
| Rev. Msgr. Allen Aganon | 1994-1998 |
| Rev. Msgr. Jesus Romulo Rañada | 2001-2002 |
| Rev. Fr. Edwin Mercado | 2002-2008 |
| Rev. Msgr. Hernando Coronel | 2008-2015 |
| Rev. Fr. Joselito Martin | 2015-2024 |
| Rev. Fr. Rolando Garcia Jr. | 2024-present |

== Priestly formation program of San Carlos Seminary ==
Being the only seminary run by diocese in Metro Manila with a dual status of house of formation and house of studies offering civil degrees in theology and philosophy, recognized and accredited by the Commission on Higher Education as with other colleges and universities, San Carlos Seminary provides updated holistic priestly formation for the dioceses of Metro Manila, as well as in other parts of the country and abroad, for as long as seminarians are recommended by their respective local ordinary.

A young man is accepted after rigorous screening. A high school diploma and baptismal certificate are the minimum requirements, yet standards of intelligence and psychological maturity must also be met. The priestly formation is holistic. The seminary organizes its programs of formation under five main aspects coined as CHIPS: Community, Human, Intellectual, Pastoral, and Spiritual Formation.

== Stages of priestly formation ==
The seminary formation comprises three stages: Pre-College, Philosophy, and Theology.

=== Propaedeutic Stage (Pre-College Department) ===
- Fresh high school graduates, college undergraduates and graduates, who are no more than 22 years of age, undergo this one-year period of rigid seminary orientation. They learn the rubrics of prayer life, community living, study habits, and personal growth. This stage was used to be called the Juniorate Department because from 1990 to 2005, it housed both the Formation Year seminarians and the First Year Philosophy seminarians. With the adoption of the K-12 curriculum, a senior high school wing was added.

==== Directors of the Pre-College Department ====
- 1979–1982, Jesse Mercado (Diocese of Parañaque)
- 1982–1985, Jesus-Norriel Bandojo
- 1985–1987, Lazaro Abaco
- 1987–1988, Francisco Siguan (Diocese of Parañaque)
- 1988–1993, Jesus-Norriel Bandojo
- 1993–1995, Raymond Joseph Arre (Diocese of Cubao)
- 1995–1999, Leandro Magnait (Diocese of Kalookan)
- 1999–2002, Jose Peregrino Tomas (Diocese of Novaliches)
- 2002–2007, Carlo Magno Marcelo
- 2007–2014, Jose Francisco Syquia
- 2014−2015, 2022−2023, Kristoffer Habal
- 2015−2022, Godwin Tatlonghari
- 2023−2024, Ramon Merino
- 2024 - present, Carlo Magno Marcelo

=== Discipleship Stage (Philosophy Department) ===
- Seminarians admitted to the First Year are only those coming from the Formation Year Department (or pre-college from other seminaries) and graduates of the minor seminary. During the four years of this stage, the seminarian is equipped with academic knowledge for critical thinking and understanding of matters of faith and morality, a profound sense of spirituality and community living, and grounding in pastoral activities.
- The Philosophy curriculum is compliant with the provisions of the Commission on Higher Education of the Department of Education. Seminarians who complete the academic requirements are granted the Bachelor of Arts (A.B.) Degree in Philosophy, Major in Classical Philosophy.
- The role of the Director can be equated with the term Prefect or Dean of Seminarians.

==== Directors of the Philosophy Department ====
- 1974–1976, Oscar V. Cruz (Archdiocese of Lingayen-Dagupan)
- 1976–1978, Severino Anatalio
- 1978–1979, Francisco De Leon (Diocese of Antipolo)
- 1979, Miguel Ilagan
- 1979–1980, Jesse Mercado (Diocese of Parañaque)
- 1980–1984, Emmanuel Sunga
- 1984–1985, Jesus-Norriel Bandojo
- 1985–1986, Ramon Tirania (Diocese of Bacolod)
- 1986–1987, Lazaro Abaco
- 1987–1989, Roberto Reyes (Diocese of Cubao)
- 1989–1992, Melchor Montalbo (Diocese of Parañaque)
- 1992–1993, Benito Tuazon
- 1993–1997, Alex Amandy (Diocese of Kalookan)
- 1997–1998, Raymond Joseph Arre (Diocese of Cubao)
- 1998–2001, Lorenz Moises Festin
- 2001–2003, Ferdinand Santos (Archdiocese of Miami - Florida, USA)
- 2003–2005, Jason Laguerta
- 2005–2015, Rey Anthony Yatco
- 2015−2024, Kristoffer Habal
- 2024−present, Jaime Vidal Zuñiga

==== Academic Deans of the Philosophy Department ====
- 1977–1979, Francisco De Leon (Diocese of Antipolo)
- 1979–1980, Feliciano Manalili
- 1980–1985, Emmanuel Sunga
- 1985–1987, Gerardo Giovanni Tapiador (Diocese of Novaliches)
- 1987–1994, Melchor Montalbo (Diocese of Parañaque)
- 1994–1995, Leandro Magnait (Diocese of Kalookan)
- 1995–1996, Melchor Montalbo (Diocese of Parañaque)
- 1996–1997, Henry Ferreras (Diocese of Cubao)
- 1997–1998, Dennis S. Odiver
- 1998–2015, Lorenz Moises Festin
- 2015–2022, Isidro Marinay
- 2022−2024, Leo Angelo Ignacio
- 2024–present, Ryan Jamemar Belono-ac

=== Configuration Stage (Theology Department) ===
- At this stage, the seminarian is formed to be a pastoral theologian in fulfillment of the demands of the church for his future ministry. He should exemplify traits of a responsible shepherd and conscious leader.
- There are five years allotted for the theological formation of a seminarian: 4 for the course proper and 1 for the PSIY. Between his Second Year and Third Year, he undergoes the Pastoral-Spiritual Integration Year (or PSIY) wherein he begins to discern seriously his vocation to the priesthood through lengthy activities of pastoral outreach, community building, and prayerful discernment.
- In the absence of the Seminary Rector, the Director of the Theology Department assumes the responsibilities of this post. In the past, there was a vice-rector who would assist in the key administration of the seminary. The last vice-rector, Estelito Villegas, was installed parish priest of Saints Peter and Paul Parish in Poblacion, Makati in January 2007, upon the request of the seminary fathers to cater the need for a seminary parish for the ongoing formation of seminarians.
- Seminarians who would complete the course requirements will be granted a Master's Degree in either Theology (thesis program), Pastoral Ministry (non-thesis), or Spirituality.
- The role of the Director can be equated with the term Prefect or Dean of Seminarians.

==== Directors of the Theology Department ====
- 1974–1978, Sabino Vengco (Diocese of Malolos)
- 1978–1979, Feliciano Manalili
- 1979-1981, Francisco De Leon (Diocese of Antipolo)
- 1981–1985, Sabino Vengco (Diocese of Malolos)
- 1985–1987, Edwin Agapay (Prelature of Infanta)
- 1987–1993, Edwin Mercado
- 1993–1998, Mario Sanchez (Diocese of Novaliches)
- 1998–2000, Nestor Cerbo
- 2000-2001, Gregory Ramon Gaston
- 2001-2002, Ramil Marcos (Diocese of Pasig)
- 2002–2007, Joselito Martin
- 2007–2015, Carlo Magno Marcelo
- 2015−2022, Edwin Mercado
- 2022−2024, Jose Francisco Syquia
- 2024–present, Leo Angelo Ignacio

==== Academic Deans of the San Carlos Graduate School of Theology ====
- 1978–1982, Sabino Vengco (Diocese of Malolos)
- 1982–1983, Teodoro Bacani (Diocese of Novaliches)
- 1983–1985, Sabino Vengco (Diocese of Malolos)
- 1985–1987, Edwin Agapay (Prelature of Infanta')
- 1987–1989, Gerardo Giovanni Tapiador (Diocese of Novaliches)
- 1989–1992, Gerardo Santos
- 1992–1997, Ruperto Santos (Diocese of Balanga)
- 1997–1998, Henry Ferreras (Diocese of Cubao)
- 1998–2002, Gregory Ramon Gaston
- 2002-2006, Nolan Que
- 2006–2015, Joel Jason
- 2015−2024, Enrico Emmanuel Ayo
- 2024–present, Joel Jason

==== Directors of the Pastoral-Spiritual Integration Year ====
- 1992–1993, Celestino Pascual
- 1993–1994, Allen Aganon (Diocese of Parañaque)
- 1994–2000, Ronald Macale (Diocese of Cubao)
- 2000–2007, Estelito Villegas
- 2007–2015, Joselito Martin
- 2015-2022, Ramon Jade Licuanan
- 2022−2024, Jaime Vidal Zuniga
- 2024−present, Joselito Buenafe
