= Crisostomo Yalung =

Catholic Bishop of Antipolo

The Most Reverend Crisostomo Yalung
- Bishop Emeritus of Antipolo
- Church: Catholic Church
- See: Antipolo
- Appointed: October 18, 2001
- Installed: December 3, 2001
- Term ended: December 5, 2002
- Predecessor: Protacio Gungon
- Successor: Gabriel V. Reyes
- Previous posts: Auxiliary Bishop of Manila (1994–2001); Titular Bishop of Ficus (1994–2001)

Orders
- Ordination: June 23, 1979
- Consecration: October 18, 2001 by Jaime Sin

Personal details
- Born: December 3, 1953 (age 72) Angeles, Pampanga, Philippines
- Denomination: Roman Catholic
- Spouse: Cristine Rances
- Children: 2
- Coat of arms: Crisostomo Yalung's coat of arms

Ordination history
History
Priestly ordination
- Date: June 23, 1979
Episcopal consecration
- Principal consecrator: Jaime Sin
- Co-consecrators: Oscar V. Cruz; Paciano Aniceto
- Date: May 31, 1994
- Place: Manila Cathedral

Crisostomo Ayson Yalung (born December 3, 1953) is a former Roman Catholic bishop from the Philippines. He was the second Bishop of Antipolo, serving from December 3, 2001, to October 19, 2002.

== Early life and education ==
Born in Angeles, Pampanga on December 3, 1953, Yalung studied philosophy and theology at San Carlos Seminary.

He holds a licentiate in Sacred Scriptures from the Pontifical Biblical Institute and a doctorate in Sacred Theology from the Pontifical Gregorian University in Rome. He would also attend the Fu Jen Catholic University where he learned to the Chinese language.

== Career ==
Yalung was ordained as a priest for the Archdiocese of San Fernando on June 23, 1979.

Among Yalung's pastoral assignments were being assistant parish priest in Balibago, Angeles City (1979–1980) and formator at Mother of Good Counsel Seminary in San Fernando, Pampanga (1987–1989). He served as Vice-Rector of the Lorenzo Mission Institute (1989-1991) and as Rector of San Carlos Seminary (1991–1994). He was made Papal Chaplain for the Archdiocese of Manila in 1991.

Pope John Paul II named him auxiliary bishop of Manila on March 23, 1994. Fondly known as Bishop Tom, he headed the Ecclesiastical District of Makati. Concurrently, he served as Parish Priest and Rector of the National Shrine of the Sacred Heart in San Antonio Village, Makati from 1999 to 2001.

On October 18, 2001, he was named successor to Protacio Gungon as Bishop of Antipolo. He was installed on December 3 that same year. His tenure as bishop was marked by the major renovation of the Cathedral of Antipolo, under the rectorship of Rev. Fr. Enrico Salazar, the inauguration of Our Lady of Peace and Good Voyage Seminary, and the preparation of the diocese for the upcoming establishment of the neighboring Diocese of Pasig. Around more than 10 parishes (and quasi-parishes) were established during his episcopacy.

Yalung's term was interrupted when a scandal broke out. He was discovered to have fathered a child. The incident prompted him to resign on October 19, 2002. His resignation was accepted on December 5, 2002.

== Post-resignation ==
After his resignation, the Vatican named Jesse Mercado, former Auxiliary Bishop of Manila (and a former Bishop of Parañaque), to become the diocese's erstwhile apostolic administrator pending the appointment of a new bishop, which came on December 7, 2002, with Kalibo Bishop Gabriel V. Reyes' designation as the third Bishop of Antipolo.

Yalung would work as a Social Worker in the United States, where he fled following the scandal. He had a second daughter with his lover Cristine Rances, who announced that Yalung would leave the clergy to attend to their children.

Catholic Church titles
| Preceded by Jaime Pedro Gonçalves | — TITULAR — Bishop of Ficus; May 31, 1994 – October 18, 2001 | Succeeded by Jabulani A. Nxumalo |
| Preceded by Protacio Gungon | Bishop of Antipolo; December 3, 2001 – December 5, 2002 | Succeeded by Gabriel V. Reyes |
