= Francisco Mendoza de Leon =

Filipino prelate of the Catholic Church (born 1947)

The Most Reverend Francisco Mendoza de León D.D.
- Bishop Emeritus of Antipolo
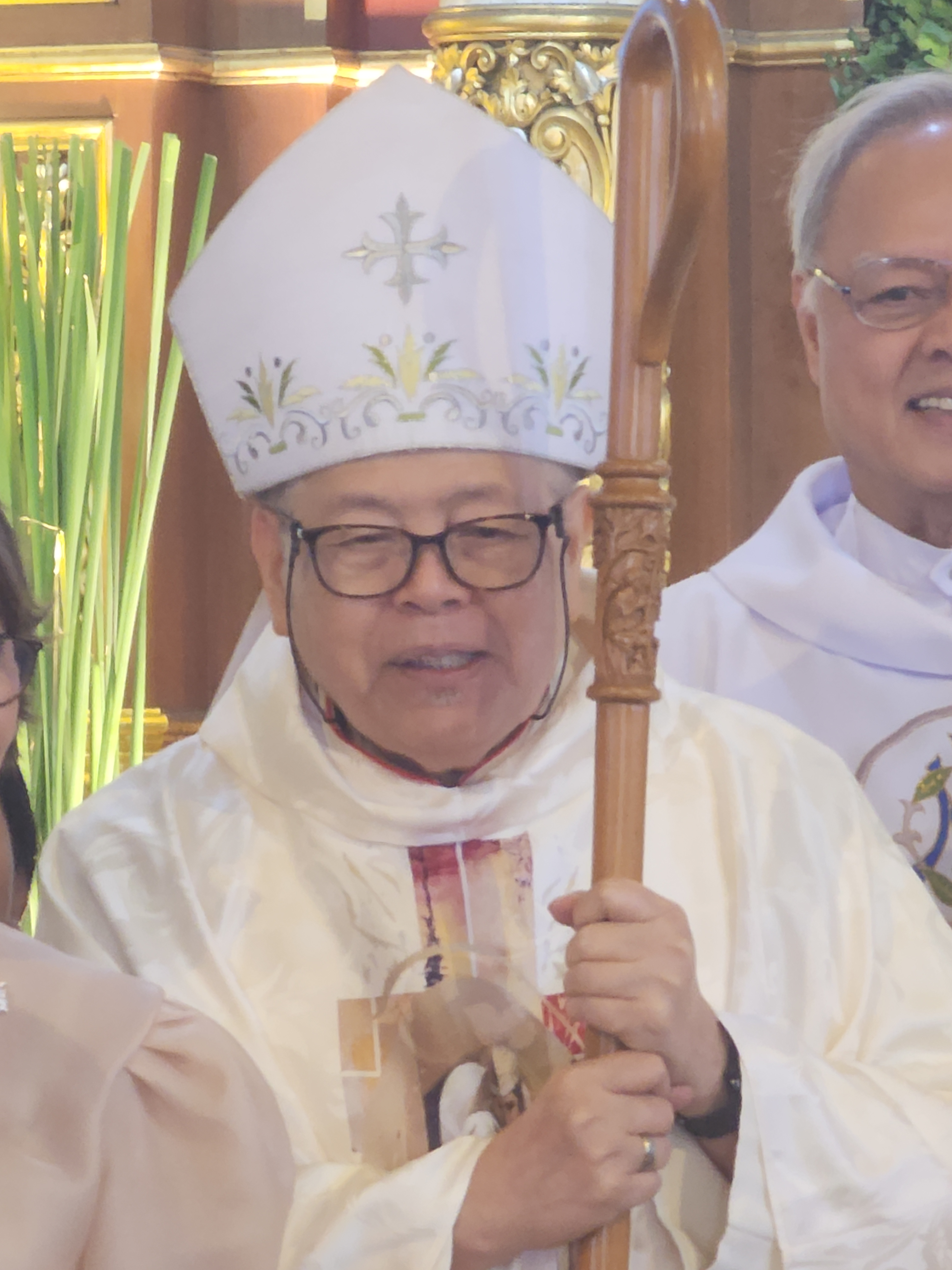
- De Leon in 2025
- Church: Catholic Church
- Province: Manila
- Diocese: Antipolo
- See: Antipolo
- Appointed: November 22, 2015 (Coadjutor)
- Installed: September 10, 2016
- Retired: May 24, 2023
- Predecessor: Gabriel Villaruz Reyes
- Successor: Ruperto Cruz Santos
- Previous posts: Auxiliary Bishop of Antipolo (2007–2016); Apostolic Administrator of Kalookan (2013–2015)

Orders
- Ordination: June 28, 1975 by Jaime Lachica Sin
- Consecration: September 1, 2007 by Gaudencio Rosales

Personal details
- Born: June 11, 1947 (age 79) La Huerta, Parañaque, Rizal, Philippines
- Motto: Jesu, in te confido (Latin for 'Jesus, I trust in You')

Ordination history
History
Priestly ordination
- Ordained by: Jaime Lachica Sin
Episcopal consecration
- Principal consecrator: Gaudencio Rosales
- Co-consecrators: Socrates Villegas; Gabriel Villaruz Reyes
Episcopal succession
Bishops consecrated by Francisco Mendoza de Leon as principal consecrator
- Nolly C. Buco: September 8, 2018
- Styles
- Reference style: His Excellency; The Most Reverend
- Spoken style: Your Excellency
- Religious style: Bishop

Francisco Mendoza de León (born June 11, 1947), is a Filipino prelate of the Catholic Church who served as Bishop of Antipolo from 2016 to 2023.

== Biography ==
De León was born June 11, 1947, in La Huerta, Parañaque, Philippines. He studied philosophy at Our Lady of Guadalupe Minor Seminary and theology at San Carlos Seminary. He was ordained a priest on June 28, 1975, by Manila Archbishop Jaime Sin.

He served as an assistant parish priest of Santa Clara de Montefalco Parish in Pasay for two years before he was appointed director of studies, then prefect of discipline and finally rector at Our Lady of Guadalupe Minor Seminary. He was later named as rector of San Carlos Seminary from 1986 to 1991. He was the parish priest of St. Andrew the Apostle Parish in Makati from 1991 to 1993, Holy Eucharist Parish in Moonwalk, Parañaque from 1993 to 1998, and Archdiocesan Shrine of the Divine Mercy in Mandaluyong in 2001. He became rector of San Carlos Seminary once again from 1998 to 2001.

On June 27, 2007, Pope Benedict XVI appointed him Auxiliary Bishop of Antipolo and Titular Bishop of Boseta. He was consecrated on September 1, 2007, by Gaudencio Rosales, the Cardinal-Archbishop of Manila; the co-consecrators were Socrates Villegas, Bishop of Balanga, and Gabriel V. Reyes, Bishop of Antipolo.

On January 25, 2013, Bishop de León was appointed as the Apostolic Administrator of the Diocese of Kalookan after the resignation of Deogracias Iñiguez Jr. due to his health condition.

On November 22, 2015, Pope Francis appointed him Coadjutor Bishop of Antipolo after serving as auxiliary bishop for almost eight years. He succeeded Gabriel V. Reyes as Bishop of Antipolo on September 9, 2016, upon Reyes's retirement. De Leon was installed the following day.

After turning 75 in 2022, de León submitted his resignation as Bishop of Antipolo as required by canon law. On May 24, 2023, Pope Francis accepted de León's resignation and appointed Ruperto Santos as his successor.

Catholic Church titles
Preceded by Antonio Magnoni	— TITULAR — Bishop of Boseta; September 1, 2007 – November 21, 2015	Succeeded by Miguel Fernando Mariño
Preceded by Gabriel V. Reyes	Bishop of Antipolo; September 9, 2016 – May 24, 2023; Coadjutor: November 22, 2015 – September 9, 2016	Succeeded by Ruperto Santos
