= St. John Paul II Minor Seminary =

Roman Catholic seminary in Rizal, Philippines

- Seminaryo Minor ng San Juan Pablo II
- The Minor Seminary of the Diocese of Antipolo

Location
- Maguey Road (near Empress Subdivision), Barangay San Luis, Antipolo, Rizal; Philippines
- Coordinates: 14°35′56″N 121°11′32″E

Information
- Type: Private Roman Catholic non-profit Basic education institution
- Religious affiliation: Roman Catholic Diocese of Antipolo
- Established: 2007; 19 years ago
- Founder: Bishop Gabriel V. Reyes, D.D.
- Rector: Rev. Msgr. Pedro C. Cañonero, Ph.D
- Grades: K to 12

St. John Paul II Minor Seminary (abbreviated "SJPIIMS") is the high school seminary of the Diocese of Antipolo located along Maguey Road, Barangay San Luis, Antipolo, Rizal, Philippines. The seminary was established in 2007, with a pioneer of forty-eight (48) first year seminarians in June 2007, coming from the Province of Rizal and from some parts of Metro Manila. The seminary produced its first batch of graduates at the end of the academic year 2010–2011. At present, the school follows the K-12 basic education system, which is the curriculum implemented by the Department of Education, with lay teachers coming from Our Lady of Peace School beside Antipolo Cathedral.

== Rectors ==
- Rev. Fr. Mabini O. Cabildo (2007-2010)
- Rev. Fr. Joselito A. Santos (2010-2011)
- Rev. Fr. Jose C. Bautista (2011-2016)
- Rev. Fr. Neil Vincent M. Tacbas, Ed.D (2016–2021)
- Rev. Msgr. Pedro C. Cañonero, Ph.D (2021–present)
