= Gabriel V. Reyes =

Filipino Roman Catholic bishop (born 1941)

The Most Reverend Gabriel V. Reyes D.D.
- Bishop Emeritus of Antipolo
- Church: Roman Catholic Church
- Diocese: Antipolo
- See: Antipolo
- Appointed: December 7, 2002
- Installed: January 29, 2003
- Retired: September 9, 2016
- Predecessor: Crisostomo Yalung
- Successor: Francisco M. De Leon
- Previous posts: Auxiliary Bishop of Manila (1981–1992); Bishop of Kalibo (1992–2002)

Orders
- Ordination: December 21, 1966
- Consecration: April 3, 1981 by Bruno Torpigliani

Personal details
- Born: Gabriel Villaruz Reyes; August 3, 1941 (age 85) Kalibo, Capiz, Philippines
- Motto: Ora et labora (Latin for 'Pray and work')
- Coat of arms: Gabriel V. Reyes's coat of arms

Ordination history
History
Episcopal consecration
- Principal consecrator: Bruno Torpigliani
- Co-consecrators: Antonio Floro Frondosa; Amado Paulino y Hernandez
- Styles
- Reference style: His Excellency; The Most Reverend
- Spoken style: Your Excellency
- Religious style: Bishop

Gabriel Villaruz Reyes (born August 3, 1941) is a Filipino bishop of the Roman Catholic Church who served as the third bishop of the Roman Catholic Diocese of Antipolo from 2002 to 2016. Prior to this, he was the Bishop of Kalibo from 1992 to 2002 and Auxiliary Bishop of Manila from 1981 to 1992.

== Early life and education ==
Gabriel Villaruz Reyes was born on August 3, 1941, in Kalibo, which was then part of Capiz. He is the nephew of the late Gabriel Reyes, the first Filipino Archbishop of Manila. He attended St. Mary's College for his early education and later transferred to Colegio de la Purisima Concepcion. He entered Our Lady of Guadalupe Minor Seminary in 1953 and pursued his philosophical studies at San Carlos Seminary, earning a Bachelor of Arts degree from 1959 to 1961. He then continued his theological studies at the Pontifical Gregorian University in Rome from 1961 to 1962 and later at San Carlos Seminary from 1964 to 1967.

== Priesthood and ministry ==
Reyes was ordained a priest on December 21, 1966, at the Manila Cathedral. His early assignments included serving as the Secretary of Manila Archbishop Rufino Cardinal Santos from 1967 to 1968. He later became a Parochial Vicar at Pinaglabanan Church in San Juan, then in Rizal, from 1968 to 1970, followed by his tenure as Parochial Vicar at Immaculate Conception Parish in Tayuman, Tondo, Manila, from 1970 to 1971. He also served as an Assistant Chaplain at Pius XII Center in Manila from 1971 to 1972 and as a Parochial Vicar at San Miguel Parish Church, Manila, from 1972 to 1974. From 1974 to 1979, he served as Secretary to Manila Archbishop Jaime Cardinal Sin.

His pastoral ministry continued as the Parish Priest of San Felipe Neri Parish in Mandaluyong from 1979 to 1981. In 1981, he was appointed Parish Priest of Santa Clara Parish in Pasay.

== Episcopal ministry ==
On January 20, 1981, Pope John Paul II appointed Reyes as Auxiliary Bishop of Manila and Titular Bishop of Selsea. He received his episcopal consecration on April 3, 1981, from Apostolic Nuncio Bruno Torpigliani.

Reyes was appointed as the second Bishop of Kalibo on November 21, 1992, and was installed on January 12, 1993. He served the diocese for a decade before being appointed Bishop of Antipolo on December 7, 2002. His installation took place on January 29, 2003.

On September 9, 2016, Pope Francis accepted his retirement upon reaching the mandatory retirement age of 75. He was succeeded by Bishop Francisco M. De Leon.

Catholic Church titles
Preceded by Nicolas Huỳnh Văn Nghi	— TITULAR — Bishop of Selsea; April 3, 1981 – November 21, 1992	Succeeded by André Dupuy
Preceded by Juan Nicolasora Nilmar	Bishop of Kalibo; January 12, 1993 – December 7, 2002	Succeeded by Jose Romeo Lazo
Preceded by Crisostomo Yalung	Bishop of Antipolo; January 29, 2003 – September 9, 2016	Succeeded by Francisco Mendoza de Leon
