= Diocese of Antipolo =

Catholic diocese in the Philippines

Diocese of Antipolo Dioecesis Antipolensis Diyosesis ng Antipolo Diócesis de Antipolo

Catholic
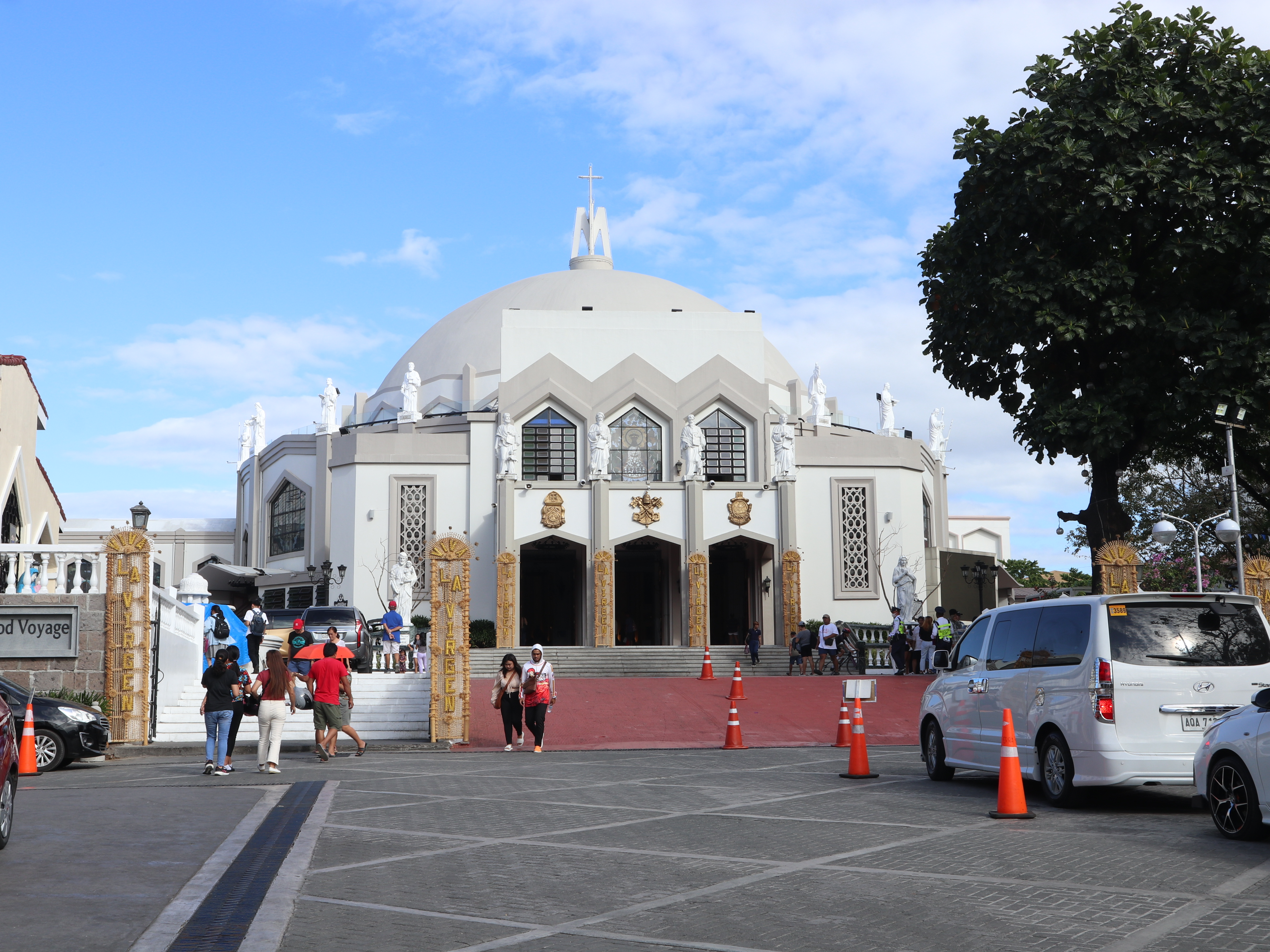
- Antipolo Cathedral

- Coat of arms

Location
- Country: Philippines
- Territory: Rizal; Marikina City
- Ecclesiastical province: Manila
- Metropolitan: Manila
- Coordinates: 14.5876°N 121.1770°E

Statistics
- Area: 1,828 km^{2} (706 sq mi)
- Population: Total; Catholics: (as of 2021); 3,728,586; 3,026,699 (81.2%)
- Parishes: 73 (9 shrines, 2 quasi-parishes, and 2 minor basilica)

Information
- Denomination: Catholic
- Sui iuris church: Latin Church
- Rite: Roman Rite
- Established: June 25, 1983; 43 years ago
- Cathedral: Cathedral-Parish of the Immaculate Conception — International Shrine of Our Lady of Peace and Good Voyage
- Patron saint: Our Lady of Peace and Good Voyage
- Secular priests: 95

Current leadership
- Pope: Leo XIV
- Bishop: Ruperto Santos
- Metropolitan Archbishop: Jose Advincula
- Bishops emeritus: Crisostomo Yalung; Gabriel Villaruz Reyes; Francisco Mendoza de Leon

Website
- Diocese of Antipolo

The Diocese of Antipolo (Latin: Dioecesis Antipolensis, Filipino: Diyosesis ng Antipolo, Spanish: Diócesis de Antipolo) is a Latin Church ecclesiastical territory or diocese of the Catholic Church in the Philippines that comprises the Province of Rizal and the city of Marikina in Metro Manila.

At present, the Diocese of Antipolo is considered to be one of the largest local churches in the Philippines in terms of its Catholic population. Among the 86 ecclesiastical jurisdictions present in the Philippines today, the diocese is the third largest local church in terms of its Catholic population after the Archdiocese of Cebu, and the Diocese of Malolos (Bulacan and Valenzuela City). The population of the whole area covering the diocese is 3,650,000, of which 3,280,000 (or 90%) are Catholics. The seat or center of the diocese is the Antipolo Cathedral, one of the most popular Marian shrines in the country where the historic Canonically crowned image of Our Lady of Peace and Good Voyage (Nuestra Señora de la Paz y Buen Viaje) (the Virgin of Antipolo) is enshrined.

== History ==
On January 24, 1983, during his Angelus message, Pope John Paul II announced the creation of the Diocese of Antipolo, which would encompass the whole province of Rizal, the entire Marikina, and part of Pasig (Barangays Dela Paz, Santolan, Manggahan, Rosario, and Santa Lucia, which altogether formed the Vicariate of Santo Tomas de Villanueva, now belonging to the Diocese of Pasig). It is an area that was previously known in the Archdiocese of Manila as the Ecclesiastical District of Eastern Rizal. A suffragan of the said archdiocese, the diocese was canonically established on June 25, 1983.

The first bishop of Antipolo was Protacio G. Gungon. On December 3, 2001, he was succeeded by Crisostomo Yalung as the second bishop, followed by Gabriel V. Reyes, former Bishop of Kalibo in Aklan, as the third bishop. Bishop Reyes was assisted by the then-auxiliary and later coadjutor bishop, Francisco M. De Leon, who was named his successor and fourth bishop effective September 10, 2016.

The diocese had its First Diocesan Synod in 1993 held at Saint Michael's Retreat House in Antipolo City. The diocese has experienced some jurisdictional changes since the time the Diocese of Pasig was created, whereby six parishes within the civil boundaries of Pasig were given to the new local church, together with seven diocesan priests serving in them.

On May 23, 2023, Pope Francis named Ruperto Santos as the fifth Bishop of Antipolo to succeed Francisco Mendoza de Leon who reached the retirement age of 75. Santos became the diocese's fifth bishop upon his installation on July 22, 2023.

== Ordinaries ==
=== Bishops ===
| No. | Portrait | Name | Period in office | Notes | Coat of arms |
|---|---|---|---|---|---|
| 1 | | Protacio Guevarra Gungon | June 25, 1983 – December 3, 2001 (18 years, 161 days) | Retired | |
| 2 | | Crisostomo Ayson Yalung | December 3, 2001 – December 7, 2002 (1 year, 4 days) | Resigned following a celibacy scandal. | |
| 3 | | Gabriel Villaruz Reyes | January 29, 2003 – September 9, 2016 (13 years, 224 days) | Retired | |
| 4 | | Francisco Mendoza de Leon | September 10, 2016 – July 22, 2023 (6 years, 315 days) | Retired | |
| 5 | | Ruperto Cruz "Stude" Santos | July 22, 2023 – present (3 years, 99 days) | | |

=== Coadjutor bishop ===
| No. | Portrait | Name | Period in office | Notes |
|---|---|---|---|---|
| 1 | | Francisco Mendoza de Leon | November 21, 2015 – September 9, 2016 (293 days) | Appointed to assist Gabriel V. Reyes, later succeeded him as fourth bishop. |

=== Auxiliary bishops ===
| No. | Portrait | Name | Period in office | Titular see | Notes | Coat of arms |
|---|---|---|---|---|---|---|
| 1 | | Francisco Mendoza de Leon | September 1, 2007 – November 21, 2015 (8 years, 81 days) | Boseta | Appointed coadjutor in 2015 | |
| 2 | | Nolly Camingue Buco | September 8, 2018 – October 16, 2024 (6 years, 38 days) | Gemellae in Byzacena | Appointed Bishop of Catarman | |

=== Apostolic administrator ===
- Most Rev. Jesse Eugenio Mercado D.D (2002–2003)
- Most Rev. Francisco Mendoza De Leon D.D (2023)

== Vicars-General ==
- Rev. Msgr. Jose B. Cruz (1983–1986)
- Rev. Msgr. Mariano T. Balbago, Jr., ministering in the Archdiocese of Washington (1986–1999)
- Rev. Msgr. Rigoberto S. de Guzman (1999–2018)
- Most Rev. Francisco M. de Leon, D.D. (2007–2016)
- Rev. Msgr. Generoso A. Mediarito (2018–present)
- Most Rev. Nolly C. Buco, JCD, D.D. (2018–2024)

== See also ==
- Catholic Church in the Philippines
- John Paul II Minor Seminary
- Diocesan Shrine and Parish of St. Joseph
