= Baras Church =

Roman Catholic church in Rizal, Philippines

- Diocesan Shrine and Parish of St. Joseph
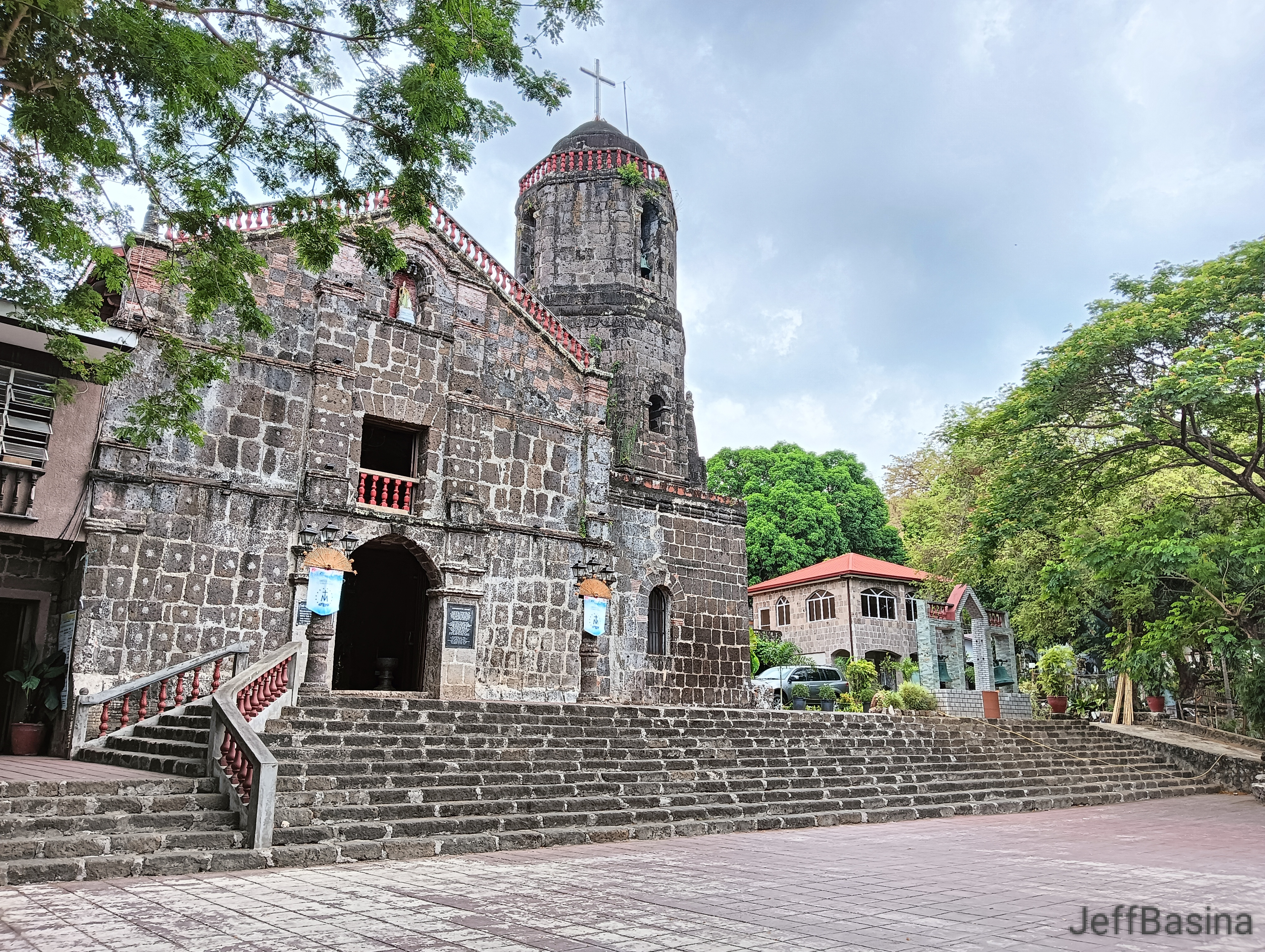
- Church façade in 2024

- Location in Luzon Location in the Philippines
- 14°31′23″N 121°16′02″E
- Location: Baras, Rizal
- Country: Philippines
- Denomination: Roman Catholic

History
- Former name: Saint Joseph Parish Church
- Status: Shrine and Parish
- Founded: 1686
- Founder(s): Franciscan Missionaries headed by Fray Pedro Bautista, Fray Juan De Plasencia and Fray Diego de Oropesa
- Dedication: Saint Joseph
- Events: Elevated to a diocesan shrine on December 7, 2021; declared a National Cultural Treasure of the Philippines on May 10, 2025.

Architecture
- Functional status: Active
- Architectural type: Church building
- Style: Baroque
- Groundbreaking: 1682
- Completed: 1686

Specifications
- Materials: Adobe Stones

Administration
- Province: Manila
- Diocese: Antipolo
- Deanery: Saint Jerome
- Parish: Saint Joseph

Clergy
- Rector: Rev. Fr. Rommel M. Felizardo
- Priest: Rev. Fr. Rommel M. Felizardo

The Diocesan Shrine and Parish of Saint Joseph, commonly known as Baras Church, is a Roman Catholic church located in Baras, Rizal, Philippines. Designated as a National Cultural Treasure of the Philippines, it enshrines the miraculous centuries-old image of San Jose de Baras (Spanish: El Glorioso Patriarca Señor San José de Baras). It is under the jurisdiction of the Diocese of Antipolo. The church is known to be the oldest parish dedicated to Saint Joseph in the Southern Tagalog Region.

== History ==
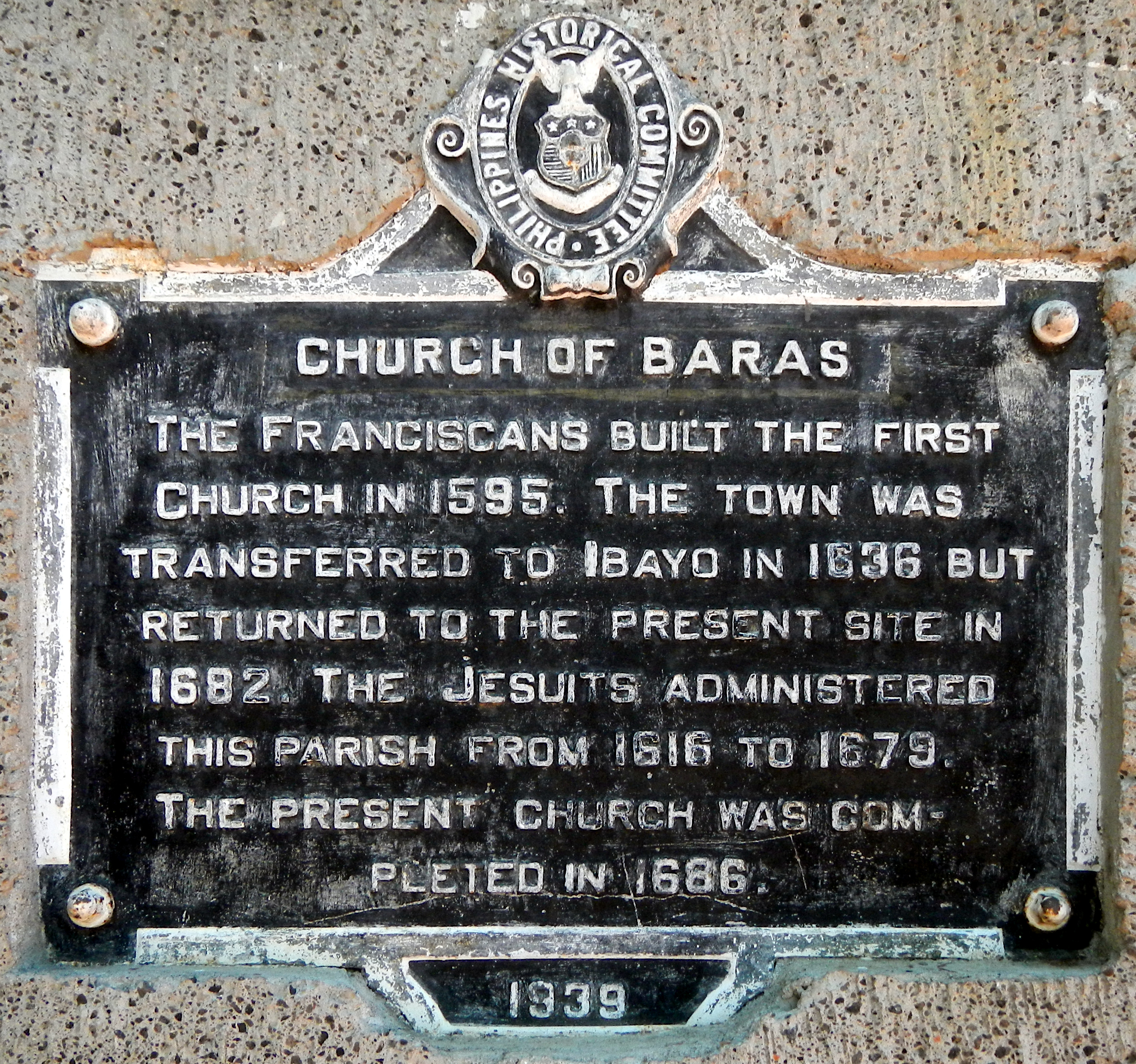
Church PHC historical marker installed in 1939

The first church was built in 1595 by Franciscan missionaries who established a parish at the town's old site in what is now Boso-Boso in Antipolo, with St. James as its patron. The town and its church was transferred in 1636 to a site called Ibayo to escape the hostilities of the Aeta inhabitants in the area who burned the town and the church in 1635. The second site was located one and one-half leagues (about 7.24 kilometers) southeast of the first site. The church was dedicated to Christ the Savior but it also was affected by hostilities, this time when Chinese rebels in 1639 burned the church as well as other churches in neighboring towns.

The town was moved to its present site in 1682. On the same year, construction began on the present church. It was completed in 1686, with the church now dedicated to St. Joseph as its patron. Renovations to the structure have been done in the 1960s and 2000s.

The Altar was solemnly dedicated and consecrated on November 9, 2019, by Most Rev. Nolly C. Buco, JCD. DD., Auxiliary Bishop of Antipolo under Pope Francis' pontificate, incumbency of Most Rev. Francisco M. de Leon, DD., Bishop of Antipolo, and Rev. Fr. Rodney B. Cruz as Parish Priest.

On December 7, 2021, consequently with the commemoration of the 500 years of Christianity in the Philippines, the culmination of the Year of St. Joseph, and the 100th anniversary of Baras' independence, the Diocese of Antipolo officially elevated and declared the historical parish church of Baras as a diocesan shrine.

The church attained national cultural recognition on May 10, 2025, when it was declared a National Cultural Treasure of the Philippines. The designation recognizes Baras Church as part of the country's most significant cultural heritage and affirms the national importance of its centuries-old history, architecture, and religious heritage.

== Architecture ==
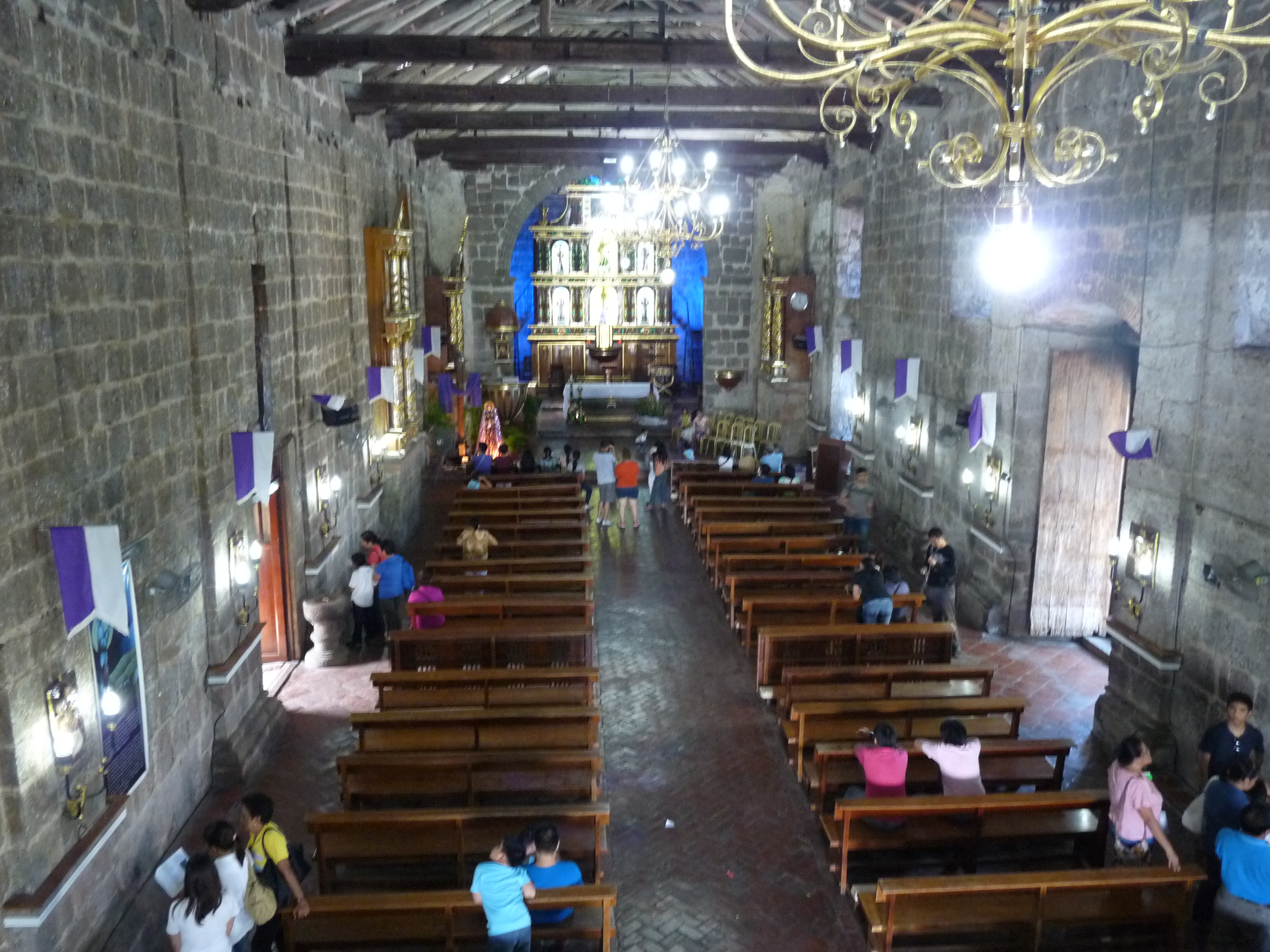
Church interior in 2012

Built in a mixture of fortress-style and barn-style Baroque architecture, the church is notable for its dark, simple, and sparse qualities that are typical of Franciscan mission churches built during the 16th century. Its simple facade is given a decorative touch mainly through the stream of balustrade trimming its triangular pediment, as well as the chequerboard pattern of brick and stone on the pediment's upper portion, which indicates an addition to the original and much lower stone pediment.

The interiors revealed the exposed wooden trusses that support the church's roofing, lacking a ceiling that is usually seen in churches. The structure has not been plastered, exposing the adobe bricks on which the church was made.

== San Jose de Baras ==
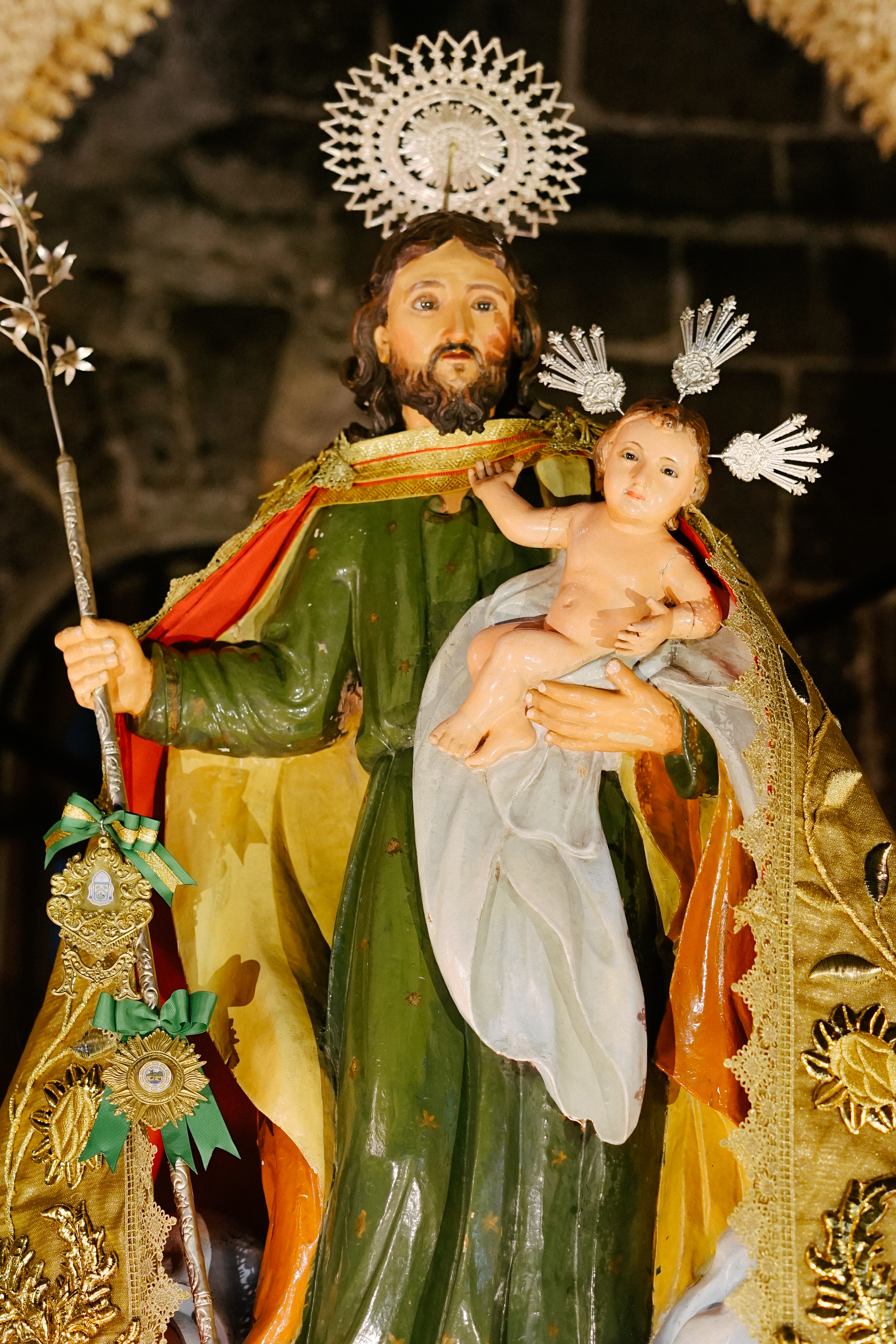
The original image

The miraculous image of San Jose de Baras (Spanish: El Glorioso Patriarca Señor San José de Baras) is a detallado image of St. Joseph cradling and facing the Christ Child on one arm and a traditional staff with a sheaf of lilies on the other. He stands atop a cloud base with the heads of two cherubs visible. The image is carved with a classic green robe with a bright golden yellow cape and a hat on his back. The Christ Child sits on a white long robe facing the beholder with right palm pointing to St. Joseph.

The venerated image is often draped in gorgeous embroidered capes offered by his devotees. Metal accouterments adorn the image, including a paragua for St. Joseph and the diagnostic tres potencias on the Christ Child's head.

On December 7, 2021, as part of the Diocesan Consecration to St. Joseph and Elevation of Baras Church as a Diocesan Shrine, two ex-voto medallions were offered and placed on the staff of the San José de Baras image by the Bishop of the Diocese of Antipolo, Most Rev. Francisco M. De Leon, DD., and Baras Municipal Mayor, Kathrine Robles.

== Gallery ==
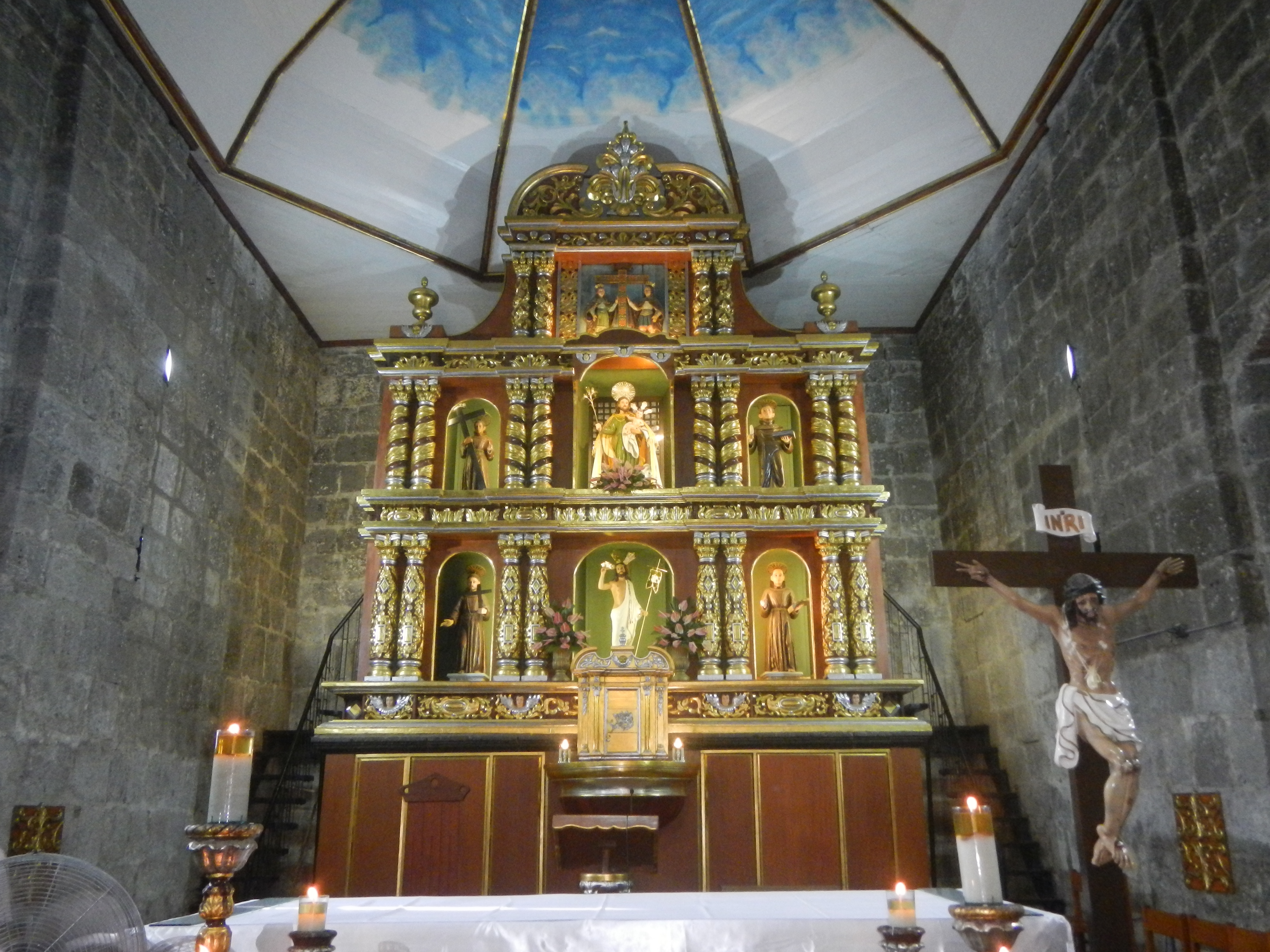
Church altar and reredos

Church Baptistry

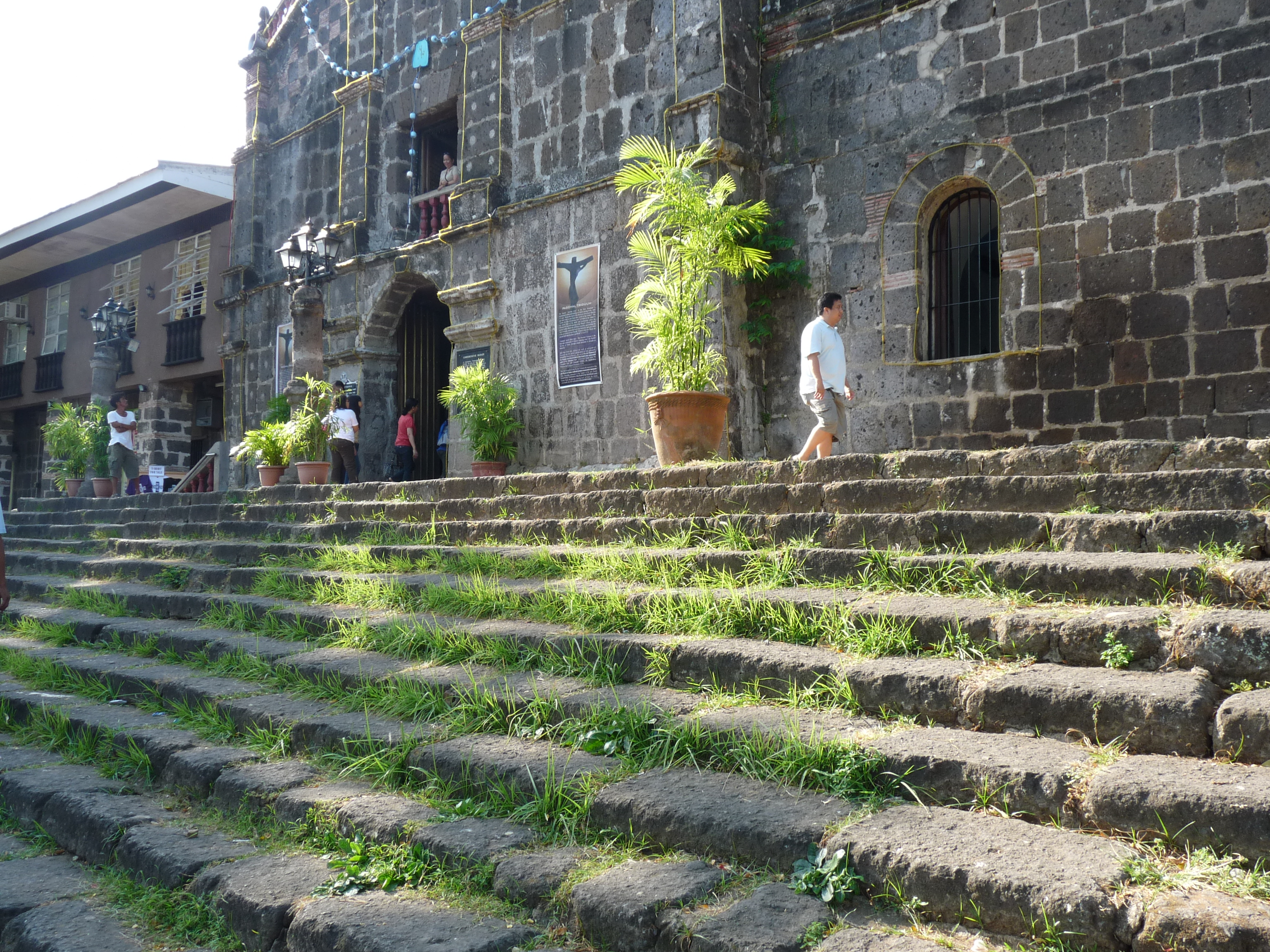
Church steps

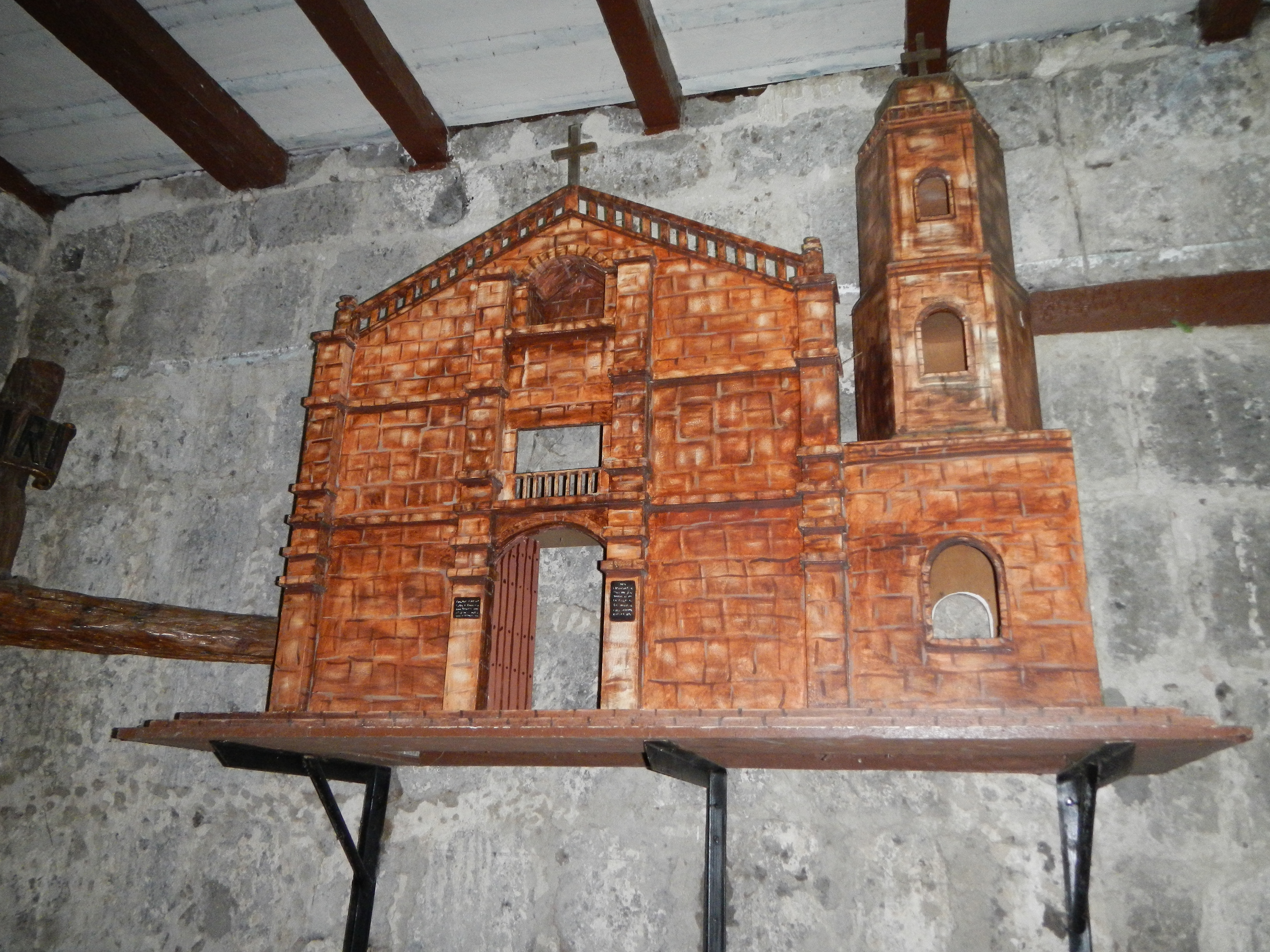
Church model

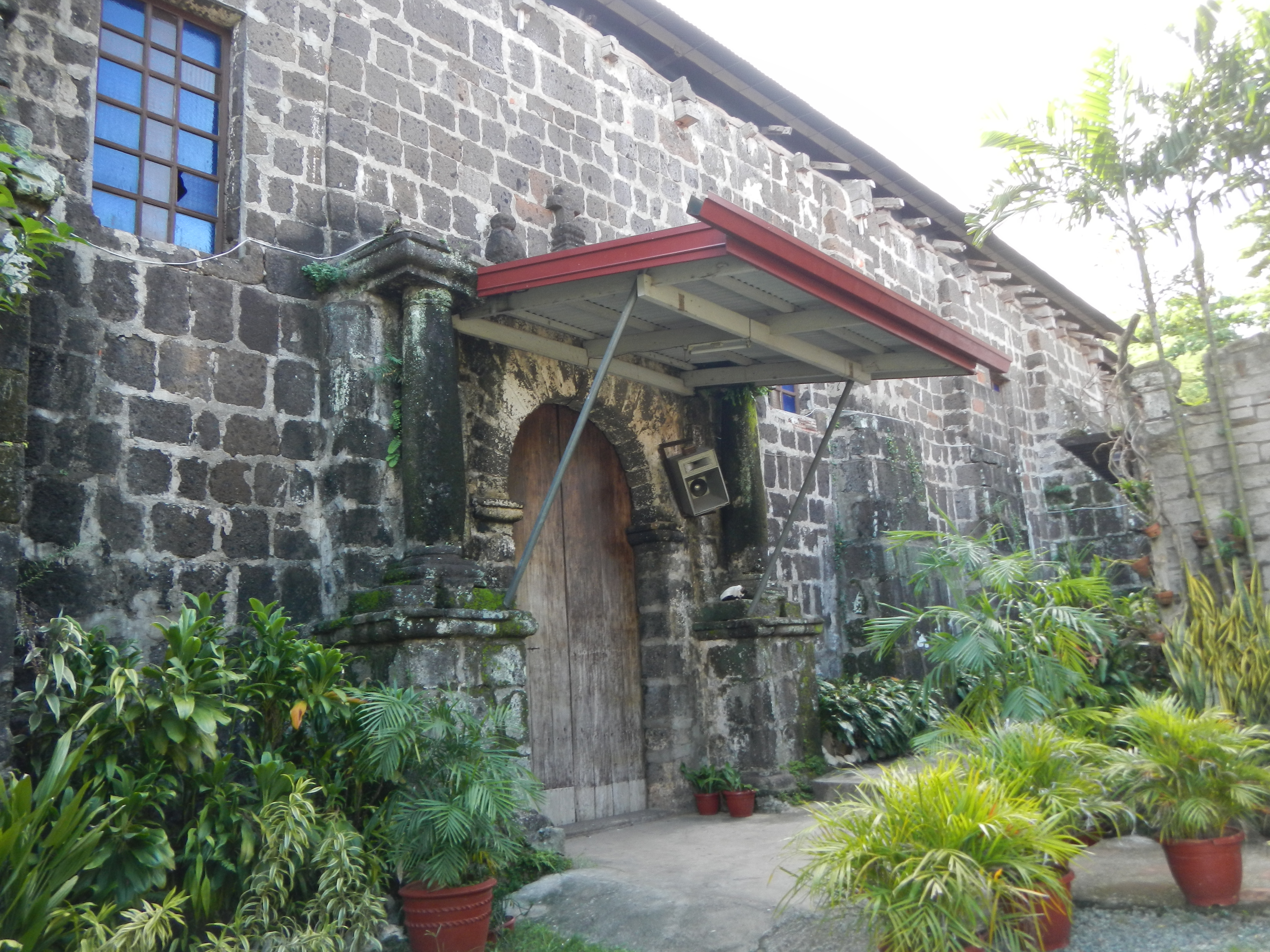
Side wall and door
