= Magnoni =

Magnoni is a surname. Notable people with the surname include:

- Agostina Belli, née Agostina Magnoni (born 1947), Italian film actress
- Antonio Magnoni (1919–2007), Italian prelate
- Michele Magnoni (born 1988), Italian motorcycle racer
