= Boseta =

Africa Proconsularis.

Boseta is an ancient suppressed and titular see of the Roman Catholic Church in North Africa. It dates from the Roman era, but with the Muslim conquest of the Maghreb ceased to effectively function. The current bishop is Marcos Pirán Gómez. Cardinal Alfonso López Trujillo was the bishop in 1972, and François van den Berghe was bishop during and after the Second World War.
