= Protacio Gungon =

Filipino Catholic bishop (1925–2014)

The Most Reverend Protacio G. Gungon D.D.
- Bishop Emeritus of Antipolo
- Church: Catholic Church
- Province: Manila
- See: Antipolo
- Appointed: January 24, 1983
- Installed: June 25, 1983
- Retired: October 18, 2001
- Predecessor: Diocese erected
- Successor: Crisostomo Yalung
- Previous post: Auxiliary Bishop of Manila (1977–1983)

Orders
- Ordination: March 29, 1952 by Gabriel M. Reyes
- Consecration: August 24, 1977 by Bruno Torpigliani

Personal details
- Born: June 19, 1925 Santa Maria, Bulacan, Philippine Islands
- Died: April 26, 2014 (aged 88)
- Motto: Viam veritatis eligere ('Choose the path of truth')
- Styles
- Reference style: His Excellency; The Most Reverend
- Spoken style: Your Excellency
- Religious style: Bishop

Protacio Guevara Gungon, D.D. (June 19, 1925 – April 26, 2014) was a Catholic bishop.

Ordained to the priesthood in 1952, Gungon was named auxiliary bishop of the Archdiocese of Manila, Philippines and titular bishop of Obba in 1977. In 1983, he became the first Bishop of Antipolo and served until 2001. He died on April 26, 2014, at the age of 88, two months shy of his 89th birthday.

Catholic Church titles
New diocese	Bishop of Antipolo; June 25, 1983 – October 18, 2001	Succeeded by Crisostomo Yalung
