= List of canonically crowned Marian images in the Philippines =

Below is a complete list of the Marian images venerated in the Catholic Church in the Philippines that were granted the honor of a canonical coronation by the Holy See. As of October 2026, there have been 66 Marian images crowned since the first in 1907. (Note: Counting also the Santo Niño de Cebu, which was crowned in 1965, brings up the number to a total of 67 canonically crowned images in the Philippines.)

Official Title of the Marian image	Date of coronation	Place of devotion	Authorization by	Marian image	Shrine of devotion
Nuestra Señora del Santísimo Rosario—La Naval de Manila	5 October 1907	Santo Domingo Church, Intramuros, Manila (former, until 1941) National Shrine of Our Lady of the Rosary—Santo Domingo Church, Quezon City (current)	Pope Pius X (Note: Pontifical decree of coronation signed for Archbishop of Palmyra, Ambrose Agius from the letter of Papal Audience granted to the Chaplain of Santa Catalina Normal School, Dominican priest Santiago Paya on 4 April 1906. Vatican Apostolic Archive.)		Former Present
Nuestra Señora de Peñafrancia	20 September 1924	Our Lady of Peñafrancia Shrine, Naga, Camarines Sur (former, until 1982) Minor Basilica and National Shrine of Our Lady of Peñafrancia, Naga, Camarines Sur (current)	Pope Benedict XV (Note: Pontifical decree of coronation, granted to the Bishop of Nueva Caceres, John Bernard MacGinley on 13 May 1920. Vatican Apostolic Archive.)		Former Present
Nuestra Señora del Santísimo Rosario de Manaoag	21 April 1926	Minor Basilica of Our Lady of the Rosary, Manaoag, Pangasinan	Pope Pius XI (Note: Pontifical decree of coronation, Sanctissimus Dominus Noster , signed and notarized by Prefect of the Sacred Congregation of Rites, Cardinal Antonio Vico on 25 August 1925. Vatican Apostolic Archive.)		
Nuestra Señora de la Paz y Buen Viaje	28 November 1926	Cathedral Parish of the Immaculate Conception—International Shrine of Our Lady of Peace and Good Voyage, Antipolo, Rizal	Pope Pius XI (Note: Pontifical decree of coronation, granted via Cardinal Rafael Merry del Val to the Archbishop of Manila, Michael James O'Doherty on 18 June 1925. Signed and notarized by Regent of the Apostolic Chancery, Vincenzo Bianchi Cagliesi and Chancellor Guardian of the Vatican Chapter, Giuseppe Cascioli. Vatican Apostolic Archive.)		
Nuestra Señora de Guadalupe	Decreed on 25 May 1938 (Note: The original image of Our Lady of Guadalupe of Pagsanjan was a casualty of the Second World War, considered to be one of the root causes of the delay of its formal coronation rites. On 12 December 1947, Bishop Alfredo Obviar solemnly crowned the replacement image carved by then renowned santero Maximo Vicente Sr.; however, the diocese is still verifying if the 1947 coronation of the replacement image can be considered as the date of pontifical coronation.)	Diocesan Shrine and Parish of Our Lady of Guadalupe, Pagsanjan, Laguna	Pope Pius XI (Note: The pontifical decree of coronation was granted by Pope Pius XI on 25 May 1938. Vatican Apostolic Archive.)		
Nuestra Señora de Piat	20 June 1954	Minor Basilica and Archdiocesan Shrine of Our Lady of Piat, Piat, Cagayan	Pope Pius XII (Note: Pontifical decree of coronation, granted on 12 May 1954 to the Archbishop of Nueva Segovia, Juan Callanta y Sison. Signed by the Secretary Deacon of the Vatican Chapter, Giulio Carlo Rossi and notarized by the Guardian Chancellor of the Vatican Chapter, Monsignor Ferdinand Prosperini Joseph Calderari. The image was solemnly crowned by Cardinal Egidio Vagnozzi. Vatican Apostolic Archive.)		
Nuestra Señora de Regla	27 November 1954	National Shrine, and Parish of Our Lady of the Rule, Lapu-Lapu City	Pope Pius XII (Note: Pope Pius XII authorized the coronation, decreeing it on 26 July 1954. Vatican Apostolic Archive.)		
Nuestra Señora de Caysasay	8 December 1954	Archdiocesan Shrine of Our Lady of Caysasay, Taal, Batangas	Pope Pius XII (Note: Pontifical decree of coronation, granted on 21 November 1954 to the Archbishop of Lipa, Alejandro Olalia y Ayson. Signed by the Secretary Deacon of the Vatican Chapter, Giulio Carlo Rossi and notarized by the Guardian Chancellor of the Vatican Chapter, Monsignor Ferdinand Prosperini Joseph Calderari. The image was solemnly crowned by the Archbishop of Santiago de Compostela, Cardinal Fernando Quiroga Palacios. Vatican Apostolic Archive.)		
Nuestra Señora de Guía	30 December 1955	Archdiocesan Shrine, and Parish of Our Lady of Guidance, Ermita, Manila	Pope Pius XII (Note: Pope Pius XII authorized the coronation, decreeing it on 3 December 1955. Vatican Apostolic Archive.)		
Nuestra Señora de la Caridad	12 January 1956	Archdiocesan Shrine of Our Lady of Charity, Bantay, Ilocos Sur	Pope Pius XII		
Virgen de los Remedios de Pampanga	8 September 1956	Repository Chapel of Virgen de los Remedios, San Fernando, Pampanga	Pope Pius XII (Note: Pontifical decree of coronation dated 15 July 1956, granted to Bishop of San Fernando, Caesar Maria Guerrero y Rodriguez. Signed by the Secretary Deacon of the Vatican Chapter, Giulio Carlo Rossi and notarized by the Secretary of the Apostolic Dataria, Marco Martini. Vatican Apostolic Archive.)		
Nuestra Señora del Pronto Socorro	10 May 1958	Cathedral Parish of the Immaculate Conception—Diocesan Shrine of Our Lady of Prompt Succor, Boac, Marinduque	Pope Pius XII (Note: Pontifical decree of coronation granted to the Bishop of Lucena, Alfredo Obviar de Maria y Aranda on 19 May 1957. Signed by the Deacon Secretary of the Vatican Chapter, Benjamin Nardone and notarized by the Secretary of Apostolic Dataria, Monsignor Marco Martini. Vatican Secret Archives.)		
Nuestra Señora del Santísimo Rosario	18 April 1959	Minor Basilica and Shrine Parish of Our Lady of the Most Holy Rosary, Orani, Bataan	Pope Pius XII (Note: Pontifical decree of coronation, granted to the Archbishop of San Fernando, Emilio Cinense y Abera on 7 October 1958, signed by Canon Secretary, Giulio Barbella and notarized by Secretary of Apostolic Dataria, Marco Martini. Vatican Apostolic Archive.)		
Nuestra Señora de Namacpacan	24 November 1959	Diocesan Shrine of Our Lady of Namacpacan, Luna, La Union	Pope John XXIII (Note: Pontifical decree of coronation, granted to Bishop Juan Callanta y Sison on 7 September 1959, signed by Canon Secretary, Giulio Barbella and notarized by Secretary of Apostolic Dataria, Marco Martini. The image was solemnly crowned by the Apostolic Nuncio to the Philippines, Salvatore Siino. Vatican Apostolic Archive.)		
Nuestra Señora del Pilar	12 October 1960	Archdiocesan Shrine of Our Lady of the Pillar, Zamboanga City	Pope John XXIII		
La Virgen Divina Pastora	26 April 1964	Minor Basilica and National Shrine of La Virgen Divina Pastora, Gapan, Nueva Ecija	Pope Paul VI (Note: Papal bull titled Novissima in Insulis, signed and granted on 19 December 1963. Notarized by the Vatican Secretary of State, Cardinal Amleto Giovanni Cicognani. Vatican Apostolic Archive.)		
Nuestra Señora de la Candelaria de Jaro	20 February 1981	Metropolitan Cathedral of Saint Elizabeth of Hungary—National Shrine of Our Lady of Candelaria, Jaro, Iloilo City	Pope John Paul II		
Nuestra Señora de Peñafrancia	10 November 1985	Archdiocesan Shrine, and Parish of Our Lady of Peñafrancia, Paco, Manila	Pope John Paul II		
La Inmaculada Concepción	7 December 1986	Diocesan Shrine, and Parish of the Immaculate Conception, Concepcion, Malabon	Pope John Paul II		
Nuestra Señora de los Desamparados	12 May 1991	National Shrine of Our Lady of the Abandoned, Santa Ana, Manila	Pope John Paul II		
Nuestra Señora del Carmen de San Sebastián	18 August 1991	Minor Basilica of San Sebastián, Quiapo, Manila	Pope John Paul II		
Nuestra Señora del Santísimo Rosario de Ubanon	15 October 1995	Diocesan Shrine, and Parish of Our Lady of the Most Holy Rosary, Ubanon-Boao, Catbalogan, Samar	Pope John Paul II		
Nuestra Señora de la Consolación y Correa	4 September 2000	Archdiocesan Shrine of Our Lady of Consolation and Cincture—San Agustín Church, Intramuros, Manila	Pope John Paul II (Note: Pope John Paul II, Congregation for Divine Worship and the Discipline of the Sacraments — Protocol Number: 1127/99/L, Archdiocese of Manila, 12 June 1999. Vatican Apostolic Archive.)		
Nuestra Señora del Buen Suceso	8 September 2000	Cathedral Parish of Saint Andrew—Diocesan Shrine of Our Lady of the Good Event, Parañaque	Pope John Paul II (Note: Pope John Paul II, Congregation for Divine Worship and the Discipline of the Sacraments — Protocol Number: 2596/99/L, Archdiocese of Manila, 18 December 1999. Vatican Apostolic Archive.)		
Nuestra Señora de los Desamparados (Note: As of June 2025, a document has since been released to the public stating that the legal ownership is still in the hands of the De Guzman-Cruz family. On December 8, 2024, a letter from the parish has been sent to the image’s camareros (caretakers) stating the return of the revered image to them. The image was brought home on June 9, 2025, and replaced with a replica of the original image from Valencia, Spain since August 5, 2025.)	23 October 2005	Diocesan Shrine and Parish of Nuestra Señora de los Desamparados, Marikina	Pope Benedict XVI (Note: Pope Benedict XVI, Congregation for Divine Worship and the Discipline of the Sacraments — Protocol Number: 1630/04/L, Diocese of Antipolo, 22 April 2005. Vatican Apostolic Archive.)		
Nuestra Señora de Guadalupe	16 July 2006	Archdiocesan Shrine, and Parish of Our Lady of Guadalupe, Cebu City	Pope Benedict XVI (Note: Pope Benedict XVI, Congregation for Divine Worship and the Discipline of the Sacraments — Protocol Number: 552/06/L, Archdiocese of Cebu, 9 May 2006. Vatican Apostolic Archive.)		
La Inmaculada Concepción	7 December 2008	Cathedral Parish of the Immaculate Conception, Pasig	Pope Benedict XVI (Note: Pope Benedict XVI, Congregation for Divine Worship and the Discipline of the Sacraments — Protocol Number: 841/08/L, Diocese of Pasig, 30 July 2008. Vatican Apostolic Archive.)		
La Inmaculada Concepción	10 March 2012	Cathedral Basilica of the Immaculate Conception, Malolos, Bulacan	Pope Benedict XVI (Note: Pope Benedict XVI, Congregation for Divine Worship and the Discipline of the Sacraments — Protocol Number: 1001/10/L, Diocese of Malolos, 11 May 2011. Vatican Apostolic Archive.)		
Nuestra Señora de la Candelaria	1 September 2012	Diocesan Shrine, and Parish of Our Lady of Candelaria, Paracale, Camarines Norte	Pope Benedict XVI (Note: Pope Benedict XVI, Congregation for Divine Worship and the Discipline of the Sacraments — Protocol Number: 77/11/L, Diocese of Daet, 16 May 2011. Vatican Apostolic Archive.)		
Nuestra Señora del Pilar	3 December 2012	Cathedral and Diocesan Shrine of Our Lady of the Pillar, Imus, Cavite	Pope Benedict XVI (Note: Pope Benedict XVI, Congregation for Divine Worship and the Discipline of the Sacraments — Protocol Number: 1000/10/L, Diocese of Imus, 11 May 2011. Vatican Apostolic Archive.)		
Nuestra Señora del Pilar	11 October 2015	Diocesan Shrine, and Parish of Our Lady of the Pillar, San Isidro, Libmanan, Camarines Sur	Pope Francis (Note: Pope Francis, Congregation for Divine Worship and the Discipline of the Sacraments — Protocol Number: 599/14, Diocese of Libmanan, 18 May 2015. Vatican Apostolic Archive.)		
Nuestra Señora de Aránzazu	31 May 2017	National Shrine, and Parish of Our Lady of Aránzazu, San Mateo, Rizal	Pope Francis (Note: Pope Francis, Congregation for Divine Worship and the Discipline of the Sacraments — Protocol Number: 240/16, Diocese of Antipolo, 17 June 2016. Vatican Apostolic Archive.)		
Nuestra Señora del Pilar	7 December 2017	Minor Basilica and Parish of Nuestra Señora del Pilar, Santa Cruz, Manila	Pope Francis (Note: Pope Francis, Congregation for Divine Worship and the Discipline of the Sacraments — Protocol Number: 302/17, Archdiocese of Manila, 27 June 2017. Vatican Apostolic Archive.)		
La Virgen Milagrosa de Badoc	31 May 2018	Minor Basilica of Saint John the Baptist—Diocesan Shrine of La Virgen Milagrosa—Mary Cause of Our Joy, Badoc, Ilocos Norte	Pope Francis (Note: Pope Francis, Congregation for Divine Worship and the Discipline of the Sacraments — Protocol Number: 495/17, Diocese of Laoag, 6 December 2017. Vatican Apostolic Archive.)		
Mary, Help of Christians	22 August 2018	Mary Help of Christians Seminary, San Fabian, Pangasinan	Pope Francis (Note: Pope Francis, Congregation for Divine Worship and the Discipline of the Sacraments — Protocol Number: 20/18, Archdiocese of Lingayen-Dagupan, 23 March 2018. Vatican Apostolic Archive.)		
Nuestra Señora del Pilar	10 October 2018	Parish of Our Lady of the Pillar, Morong, Bataan	Pope Francis (Note: Pope Francis, Congregation for Divine Worship and the Discipline of the Sacraments — Protocol Number: 63/18, Diocese of Balanga, 23 March 2018. Vatican Apostolic Archive.)		
Nuestra Señora de la Soledad de Porta Vaga	18 November 2018	Diocesan Shrine of Our Lady of Solitude of Porta Vaga, Cavite City	Pope Francis (Note: Pope Francis, Congregation for Divine Worship and the Discipline of the Sacraments — Protocol Number: 583/17, Diocese of Imus, 19 March 2018. Vatican Apostolic Archive.)		
Nuestra Señora de la Luz; María Santísima de la Lumen	1 December 2018	Diocesan Shrine, and Parish of Our Lady of Light, Cainta, Rizal	Pope Francis (Note: Pope Francis, Congregation for Divine Worship and the Discipline of the Sacraments — Protocol Number: 481/17, Diocese of Antipolo, 6 December 2017. Vatican Apostolic Archive.)		
Virgen de la Rosa	16 March 2019	Parish of Saints Peter and Paul, Poblacion, Makati	Pope Francis (Note: Pope Francis, Congregation for Divine Worship and the Discipline of the Sacraments — Protocol Number: 469/18, Archdiocese of Manila, 29 October 2018. Vatican Apostolic Archive.)		
La Purísima Concepción	1 February 2020	Minor Basilica and Parish of La Purísima Concepción, Santa Maria, Bulacan	Pope Francis (Note: Pope Francis, Congregation for Divine Worship and the Discipline of the Sacraments — Protocol Number: 103/19, Diocese of Malolos, 28 March 2019. Vatican Apostolic Archive.)		
Our Lady of Mount Carmel of New Manila	15 August 2020	Minor Basilica and National Shrine of Our Lady of Mount Carmel, New Manila, Quezon City	Pope Francis (Note: Pope Francis, Congregation for Divine Worship and the Discipline of the Sacraments — Protocol Number: 109/20, Diocese of Cubao, 13 May 2020. Vatican Apostolic Archive.)		
Nuestra Señora de Lourdes de Manila	22 August 2020	National Shrine of Our Lady of Lourdes, Quezon City	Pope Francis (Note: Pope Francis, Congregation for Divine Worship and the Discipline of the Sacraments — Protocol Number: 339/19, Diocese of Cubao, 5 September 2019. Vatican Apostolic Archive.)		
Nuestra Señora de los Dolores	25 March 2021	National Shrine, and Parish of Our Lady of Sorrows, Dolores, Quezon	Pope Francis (Note: Pope Francis, Congregation for Divine Worship and the Discipline of the Sacraments — Protocol Number: 55/19, Diocese of Lucena, 28 March 2019. Vatican Apostolic Archive.)		
Mater Dolorosa de Tarlac	5 June 2021	Parish of Mater Dolorosa, Dolores, Capas, Tarlac	Pope Francis (Note: Pope Francis, Congregation for Divine Worship and the Discipline of the Sacraments — Protocol Number: 431/20, Diocese of Tarlac, 1 October 2020. Vatican Apostolic Archive.)		
Nuestra Señora de la Merced de Novaliches	24 September 2021	National Shrine, and Parish of Our Lady of Mercy, Novaliches, Quezon City	Pope Francis (Note: Pope Francis, Congregation for Divine Worship and the Discipline of the Sacraments — Protocol Number: 172/21, Diocese of Novaliches, 24 May 2021. Vatican Apostolic Archive.)		
Patrocinio de María Santísima	23 April 2022	Archdiocesan Shrine, and Parish of Patrocinio de María Santísima, Boljoon, Cebu	Pope Francis (Note: Pope Francis, Congregation for Divine Worship and the Discipline of the Sacraments — Protocol Number: 336/21, Archdiocese of Cebu, 18 January 2022. Vatican Apostolic Archive.)		
Mary, Help of Christians	24 May 2022	Minor Basilica and National Shrine Parish of Mary Help of Christians Parish, Don Bosco, Parañaque	Pope Francis (Note: Pope Francis, Congregation for Divine Worship and the Discipline of the Sacraments — Protocol Number: 225/21, Diocese of Parañaque, 16 November 2021. Vatican Apostolic Archive.)		
Nuestra Señora de la Asunción	13 August 2022	Cathedral and National Shrine of Our Lady of the Assumption, Maasin, Southern Leyte	Pope Francis (Note: Pope Francis, Congregation for Divine Worship and the Discipline of the Sacraments — Protocol Number: 428/21, Diocese of Maasin, 14 December 2021. Vatican Apostolic Archive.)		
Nuestra Señora del Santo Rosario de Cardona—La Virgen de Sapao	7 October 2022	Diocesan Shrine, and Parish of Our Lady of the Holy Rosary, Cardona, Rizal	Pope Francis (Note: Pope Francis, Congregation for Divine Worship and the Discipline of the Sacraments — Protocol Number: 632/21, Diocese of Antipolo, 12 January 2022. Vatican Secret Archives.)		
La Inmaculada Concepción	8 December 2022	Minor Basilica of the Immaculate Conception, Batangas City	Pope Francis (Note: Pope Francis, Congregation for Divine Worship and the Discipline of the Sacraments — Protocol Number: 499/21, Archdiocese of Lipa, 14 March 2022. Vatican Apostolic Archive.)		
Nuestra Señora de la Merced	24 February 2023	Diocesan Shrine, and Parish of Nuestra Señora de la Merced, Matatalaib, Tarlac City, Tarlac	Pope Francis (Note: Pope Francis, Congregation for Divine Worship and the Discipline of the Sacraments — Protocol Number: 219/22, Diocese of Tarlac, 25 April 2022. Vatican Apostolic Archive.)		
Nuestra Señora de los Desamparados	12 May 2023	Diocesan Shrine, and Parish of Our Lady of the Abandoned, Muntinlupa City	Pope Francis (Note: Pope Francis, Dicastery for Divine Worship and the Discipline of the Sacraments — Protocol Number: 326/22, Diocese of Parañaque, 8 July 2022. Vatican Apostolic Archive.)		
Nuestra Señora de la Asunción	15 August 2023	Diocesan Shrine, and Parish of Our Lady of the Assumption, Dauis, Bohol	Pope Francis (Note: Pope Francis, Congregation for Divine Worship and the Discipline of the Sacraments — Protocol Number: 408/21, Diocese of Tagbilaran, 28 March 2022. Vatican Apostolic Archive.)		Daui
Nuestra Señora de los Dolores de Turumba	15 September 2023	Diocesan Shrine of Our Lady of Sorrows of Turumba, Pakil, Laguna	Pope Francis (Note: Pope Francis, Congregation for Divine Worship and the Discipline of the Sacraments — Protocol Number: 173/21, Diocese of San Pablo, 24 May 2021. Vatican Apostolic Archive.)		
The National Pilgrim Image of Our Lady of Fátima	25 February 2024	National Shrine and Parish of Our Lady of Fátima, Valenzuela City	Pope Francis (Note: Pope Francis, Dicastery for Divine Worship and the Discipline of the Sacraments — Protocol Number: 371/23, Diocese of Malolos, 21 November 2023. Vatican Apostolic Archive.)		
Nuestra Señora de Fátima	12 May 2024	Minor Basilica and Diocesan Shrine of Saint Paul of the Cross, Marikina	Pope Francis (Note: Pope Francis, Dicastery for Divine Worship and the Discipline of the Sacraments — Protocol Number: 18/24, Diocese of Antipolo, 24 January 2024. Vatican Apostolic Archive.)		
Nuestra Señora de la Caridad de Agoo	6 December 2024	Minor Basilica and Diocesan Shrine of Our Lady of Charity, Agoo, La Union	Pope Francis (Note: Pope Francis, Dicastery for Divine Worship and the Discipline of the Sacraments — Protocol Number: 219/24, Diocese of San Fernando de La Union, 29 April 2024. Vatican Apostolic Archive.)		
Nuestra Señora de Loreto	10 December 2024	National Shrine, and Parish of Our Lady of Loreto, Sampaloc, Manila	Pope Francis (Note: Pope Francis, Dicastery for Divine Worship and the Discipline of the Sacraments — Protocol Number: 258/24, Archdiocese of Manila, 6 May 2024. Vatican Apostolic Archive.)		
Nuestra Señora del Rosario de Fátima	1 May 2025	Diocesan Shrine, and Parish of Our Lady of Fátima, Binakayan, Kawit, Cavite	Pope Francis (Note: Pope Francis, Dicastery for Divine Worship and the Discipline of the Sacraments — Protocol Number: 525/24, Diocese of Imus, 15 October 2024. Vatican Apostolic Archive.)		
Nuestra Señora de la Anunciata	25 May 2025	Parish of Nuestra Señora de la Anunciata, Sitio Old Boso-Boso, Antipolo, Rizal	Pope Francis (Note: Pope Francis, Dicastery for Divine Worship and the Discipline of the Sacraments — Protocol Number: 700/24, Diocese of Antipolo, 9 January 2025. Vatican Apostolic Archive.)		
Nuestra Señora del Santísimo Rosario—Reina del Caracol	9 October 2025	Diocesan Shrine and Parish of Our Lady of the Most Holy Rosary, Rosario, Cavite	Pope Francis (Note: Pope Francis, Dicastery for Divine Worship and the Discipline of the Sacraments — Protocol Number: 144/25, Diocese of Imus, 3 March 2025. Vatican Apostolic Archive.)		
Virgen Sang Barangay	16 October 2025	San Sebastián Cathedral, Bacolod	Pope Leo XIV (Note: Pope Leo XIV, Dicastery for Divine Worship and the Discipline of the Sacraments — Protocol Number: 540/25, Diocese of Bacolod, 12 September 2025. Vatican Apostolic Archive.)		
Nuestra Señora de los Ángeles	17 January 2026	Parish of Our Lady of the Angels, Pila-Pila, Binangonan, Rizal	Pope Leo XIV (Note: Pope Leo XIV, Dicastery for Divine Worship and the Discipline of the Sacraments — Protocol Number: 539/25, Diocese of Antipolo, 12 September 2025. Vatican Apostolic Archive.)		
Nuestra Señora de Fátima de Urduja	29 May 2026	Diocesan Shrine, and Parish of Our Lady of Fátima, Urduja Village, Caloocan	Pope Leo XIV (Note: Pope Leo XIV granted the coronation of the statue through a decree from the Dicastery for Divine Worship and the Discipline of the Sacraments dated 7 March 2026, for the Diocese of Novaliches. Vatican Apostolic Archive.)		
Nuestra Señora de Salvación de Joroan	28 October 2026	Diocesan Shrine and Parish of Our Lady of Salvation, Joroan, Tiwi, Albay	Pope Leo XIV (Note: Pope Leo XIV, Dicastery for Divine Worship and the Discipline of the Sacraments — Protocol Number: 679/26, Diocese of Legazpi, 20 October 2026. Vatican Apostolic Archive.)		
Maria, Ina ng Kapayapaan	28 October 2026	Parish of Mary, Mother of Peace, Kasiglahan Village, Montalban, Rizal	Pope Leo XIV (Note: Pope Leo XIV, Dicastery for Divine Worship and the Discipline of the Sacraments — Protocol Number: 338/26, Diocese of Antipolo, 31 May 2026. Vatican Apostolic Archive.)		

== Maps ==
Locations of the canonically crowned images in Metro Manila
Locations of the canonically crowned images in Calabarzon
