= Shrine of Our Lady of Mercy =

Roman Catholic church in Quezon City, Philippines

National Shrine and Parish of Our Lady of Mercy
- Pambansáng Dambana at Parokya ng Iná ng Awà ng Novaliches (Filipino); Santuario Nacional y Parroquia de Nuestra Señora de la Merced de Novaliches (Spanish)
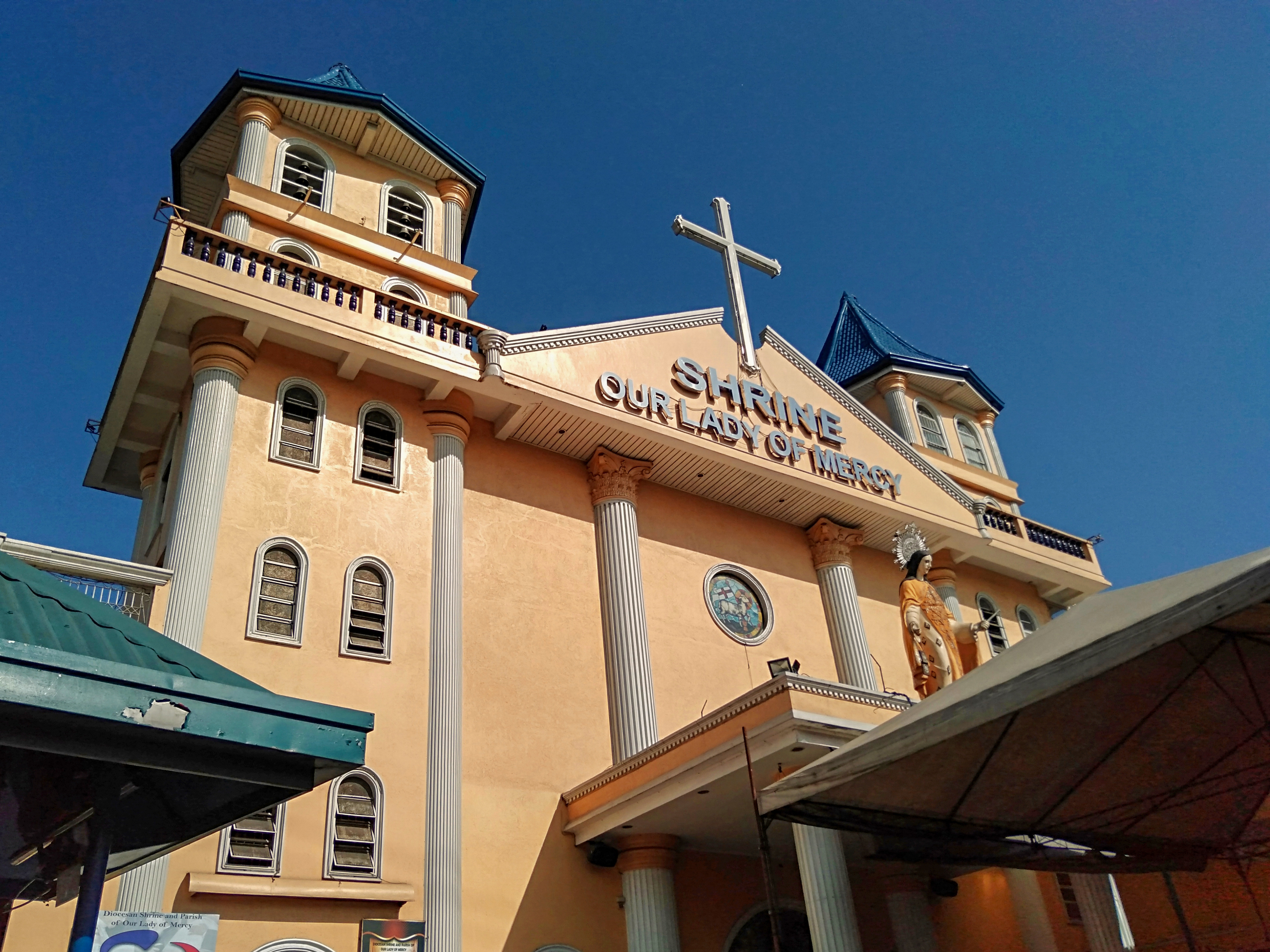
- Church facade in 2020
- National Shrine and Parish of Our Lady of Mercy
- 14°43′18″N 121°02′29″E
- Location: 1102, Quirino Highway, Novaliches, Quezon City 1117
- Country: Philippines
- Language(s): Filipino (Tagalog), English
- Denomination: Catholic Church
- Website: https://www.facebook.com/inangnovaliches

History
- Former names: Corpus Christi Chapel; Our Lady of Mercy Parish; Diocesan Shrine and Parish of Our Lady of Mercy
- Founded: September 24, 1856
- Founder(s): Established in 1854, the first church was built two years later by the Augustinians under the decree of José Julián de Aranguren, Archbishop of Manila.
- Dedication: Yes
- Dedicated: September 15, 2008 Most Rev. ANTONIO R. TOBIAS, D.D.

Architecture
- Functional status: Active
- Architectural type: Shrine

Administration
- Division: Vicariate of Our Lady of Mercy
- District: 5th Quezon City
- Province: Metropolitan Archdiocese of Manila
- Diocese: Novaliches

Clergy
- Bishop(s): Most Rev. Roberto O. Gaa, D.D.
- Rector: Rev. Fr. Aristeo M. De Leon
- Vicars: Rev. Fr. Michael George Villasis; Rev. Fr. Abe Arganiosa; Rev. Fr. Noel Tatoy; Rev. Fr. Roger Guinita

The National Shrine and Parish of Our Lady of Mercy is a Roman Catholic church under the Diocese of Novaliches in the Philippines. It is the oldest parish in the diocese, established in 1856 by the Augustinian missionaries from Spain.

The church was originally under the Archdiocese of Manila when it was established on September 24, 1856, by then-Archbishop of Manila José Julián de Aranguren. Since then, this parish had become an established landmark in the Novaliches area, witnessing the historical development of this district.

It is located along Quirino Highway, Barangay Sta. Monica, Novaliches, Quezon City. The current rector and parish priest is Rev. Fr. Aristeo M. De Leon. The annual feast day of the church is September 24.

== History ==
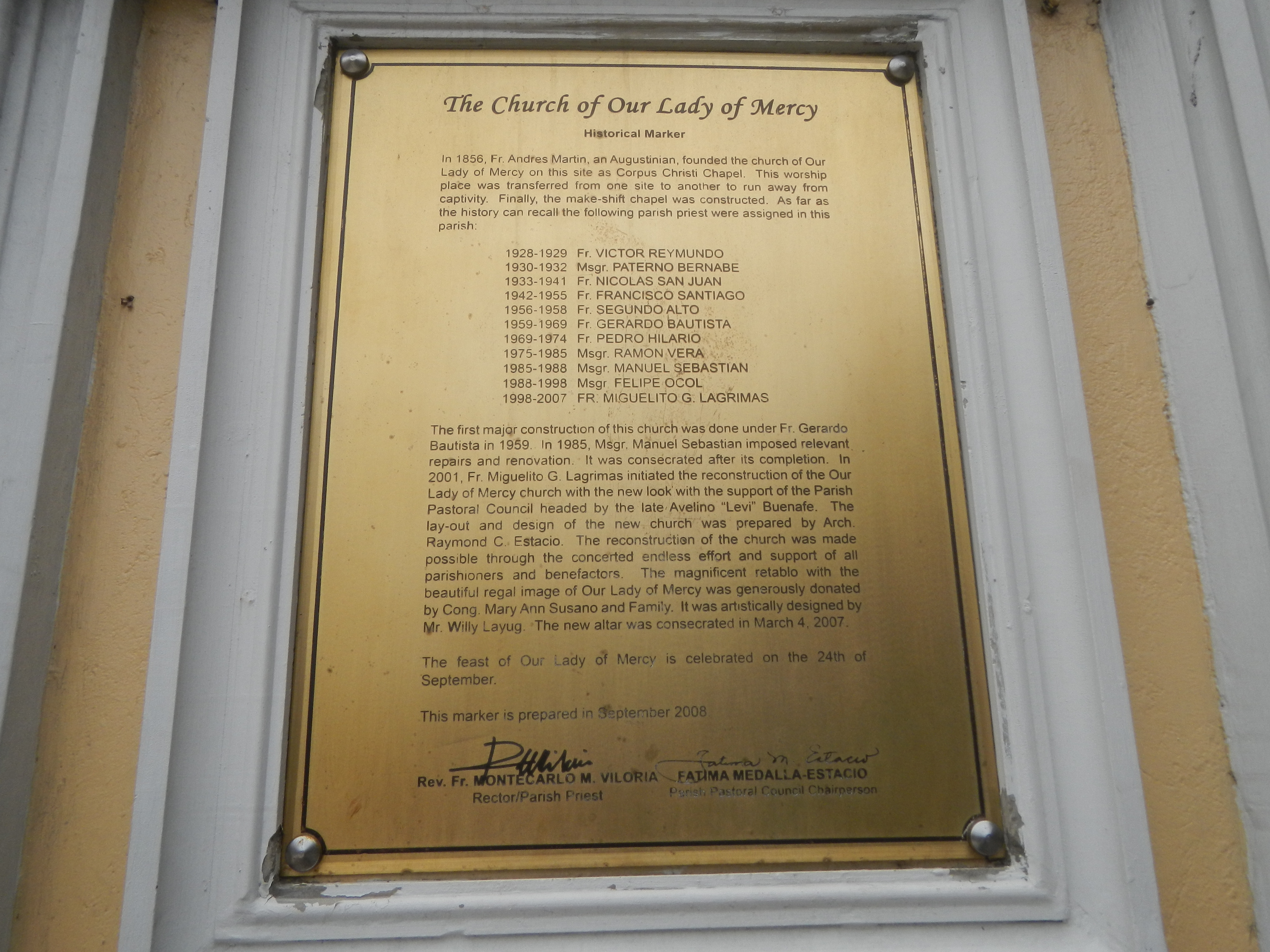
Historical plaque

=== Beginnings as a parish ===
The establishment and history of Novaliches are linked to this church. After the Novaliches district was established in 1854, the first church was built two years later by the Augustinians under the decree of José Julián de Aranguren, Archbishop of Manila. On September 24, 1856, the church was established and was initially called the Chapel of Corpus Christi, dedicated to the Blessed Sacrament. The chapel was elevated to the status of a Parroquia (parish church) and Fray André Martín, OSA was appointed as the first parish priest. It is said that he brought an image of Our Lady of Mercy holding the Child Jesus, similar to the iconography of the image of Nuestra Señora de la Consolación y Correa (Our Lady of Consolation and the Cincture) enshrined in San Agustín Church in Intramuros, Manila, and enshrined the said image in the parish.

The devotion to Our Lady of Mercy developed over the years until the Philippine Revolution of 1896 against the Spanish Empire, when the original image disappeared. The church was burnt, and the assigned Augustinian priests returned to Spain. The sole relic of the old church saved from the Revolution is a golden chalice encrusted with amethysts. This was donated by Manuel Pavía y Lacy, First Marquis de Novaliches (1814–1896), who served as the Governor-General of the Philippines from 1852 to 1854. The parcel of land where the church once stood was donated to the Archdiocese of Manila. In 1899, Novaliches was annexed to Caloocan. For about thirty years, nothing was heard about the Parroquia de Novaliches.

In 1928, the parish was restored with the appointment of a diocesan parish priest, Rev. Fr. Víctor Raymundo. The parish was renamed Our Lady of Ransom Parish, then later reverted to Our Lady of Mercy Parish. Under Rev. Fr. Segundo Alto in the 1950s, an image of Our Lady of Mercy, without the Child Jesus, emerged. According to oral history, this image was first seen by Novaliches residents in the 1930s; it was actually commissioned by Macaria Sarmiento-Mendoza in the early 20th century and was identified to have been carved by Graciano Nepomuceno. This image was considered to be "La Verdadera", being the oldest extant icon of Our Lady of Mercy in Novaliches, and was then enshrined at the high altar.

During the 1980s, the growing number of faithful residing in Novaliches prompted Rev. Msgr. Manuel Sebastián to renovate and expand the church. He also thought of commissioning a bigger replica of La Verdadera since it was too small. A de vestir ("in vestments") replica by Rufino Rivera was completed in 1985 and enshrined in its own marble side altar. In the 1990s, the image was sacrilegiously toppled and damaged by an unknown individual. The image was repaired, and once again underwent restoration for a diocesan tour around Novaliches to propagate the devotion to Our Lady of Mercy. This second image is currently brought out for processions.

=== Renovation and recognitions ===
In preparation for the elevation of the church as a diocesan shrine, another major renovation began in 2001 through the initiative of Rev. Fr. Miguelito Lágrimas and the concerted efforts of the Novalihces residents and devotees of Our Lady of Mercy. The Susano family commissioned Wilfredo Layug to make a new altar with a new image of Our Lady of Mercy, which is now seen today. The anltar image is larger than life and deviated from the iconography of La Verdadera and the processional image. The new altar was consecrated on March 4, 2007.

Due to the enduring devotion to Nuestra Señora de la Merced in Novaliches and the historical importance of her sacred place, on September 15, 2008, the parish church was elevated to the rank of diocesan shrine by Most Rev. Antonio R. Tobías, DD. On its first anniversary as a diocesan shrine, the church was presented with an 18-bell carillon, a token of gratitude from devotees of Our Lady of Mercy. The carillon bells were blessed on September 8, 2009, and installed in the belfry.

Another historical milestone was granted to the diocesan shrine on January 1, 2021. Most Rev. Roberto O. Gaa, DD declared Our Lady of Mercy as the secondary patroness of the diocese, and gave her the official title "Iná ng Novaliches" (“Mother of Novaliches”). This was due to the church being the only parish in the area for a while, and the mother church of others around the Novaliches district, including in North Caloocan.

On April 9, 2021, Most Rev. Roberto O. Gaa, DD opened the Holy Door (Jubilee Door) of the shrine as part of celebrations for 500 Years of Christianity in the Philippines. The shrine was one of fourteen jubilee churches in the diocese. On June 6, the shrine formally obtained its Spiritual Bond of Affinity to the Papal Basilica of Santa Maria Maggiore in Rome. The declaration was led by Most Rev. Charles John Brown, DD, Apostolic Nuncio to the Philippines, during a Corpus Christi Sunday Mass. This declaration would mean that habitual plenary indulgence and graces shall be granted among the faithful, under the usual conditions. On September 24, its 165th anniversary as a parish, the Pontifical and Canonical Coronation of Our Lady of Novaliches was held. The La Verdadera image received a pontifical crown and halo in a Mass presided by Most Rev. Charles John Brown, DD, and concelebrated by Most Rev. Roberto O. Gaa, DD, Most Rev. Teodoro C. Bacani, Jr., DD, and Most Rev. Antonio R. Tobías, DD.

On July 6, 2024, it was announced that the shrine, along with Maasin Cathedral, were to be elevated to the rank of National shrine. Cardinal José Advíncula, the Adchbishop of Manila, led Mass and declaration rites that September 15, the first novena day for the shrine's 168th fiesta. Concelebrating were Bishops Mylo Hubert Vergara, Teodoro Bacani, Antonio Tobías, and Roberto Gaa.

== Images of the Our Lady of Mercy of Novaliches ==
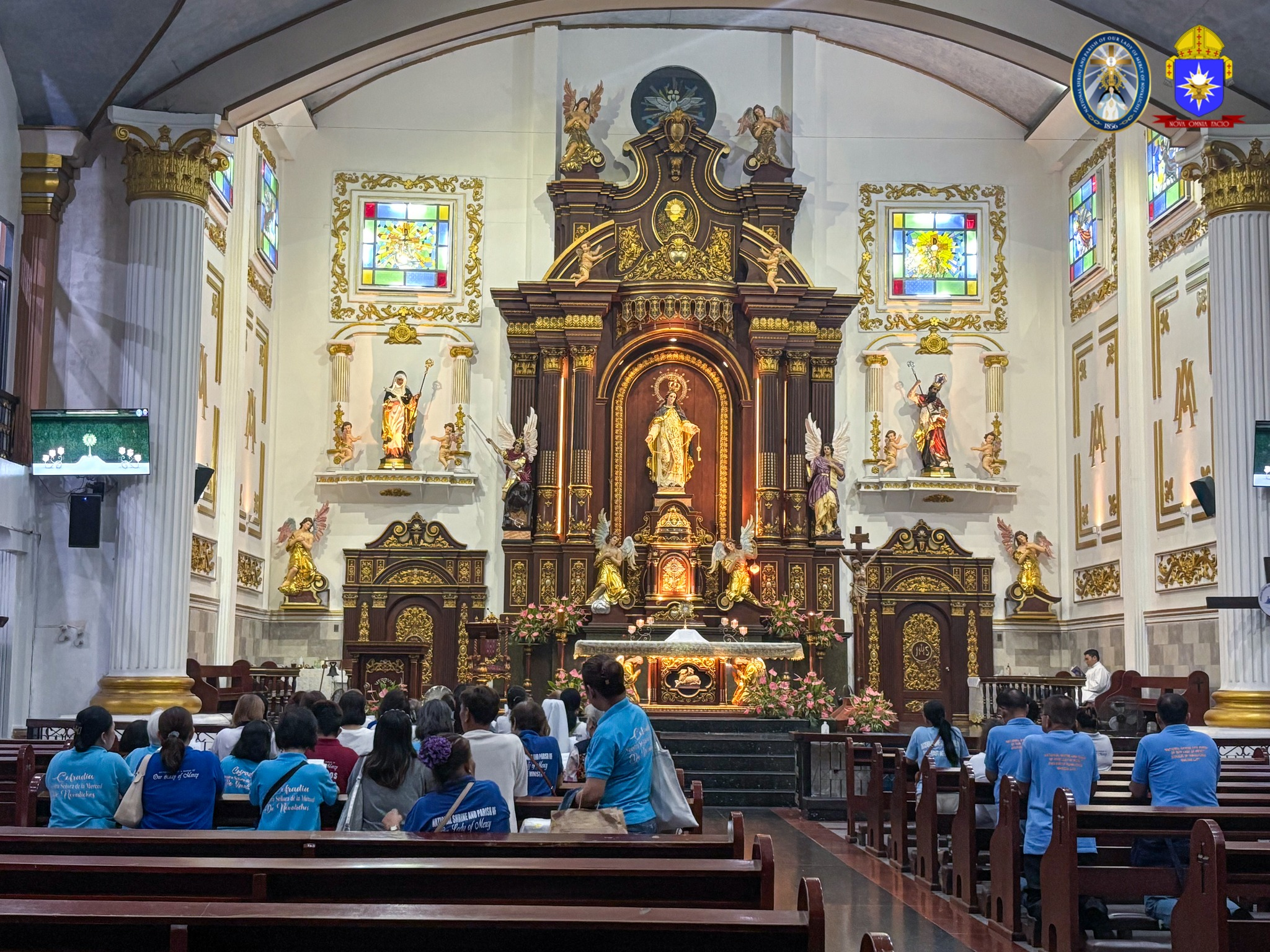
Church interior 2025

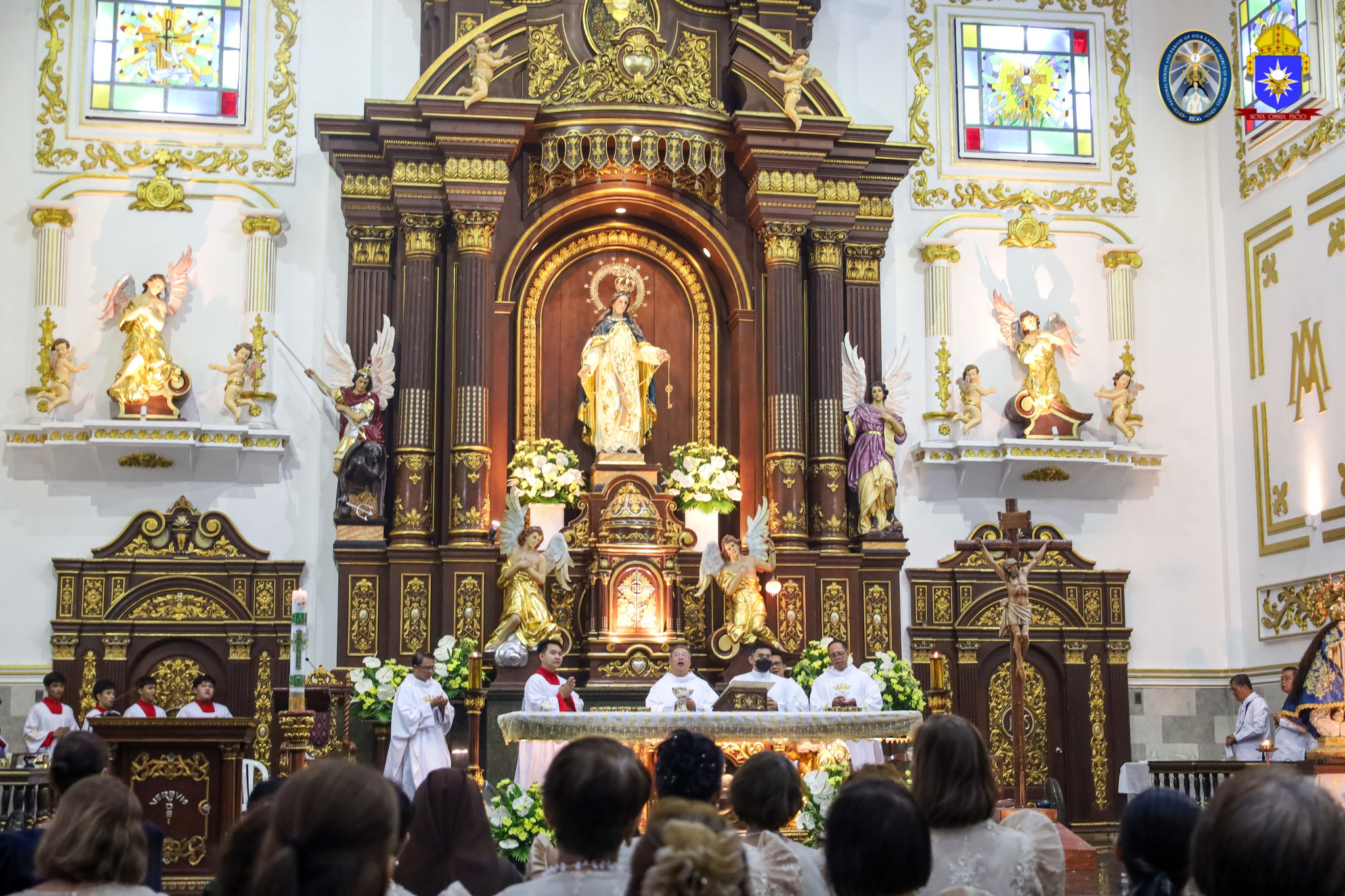
Church interior during Corpus Christi 2025

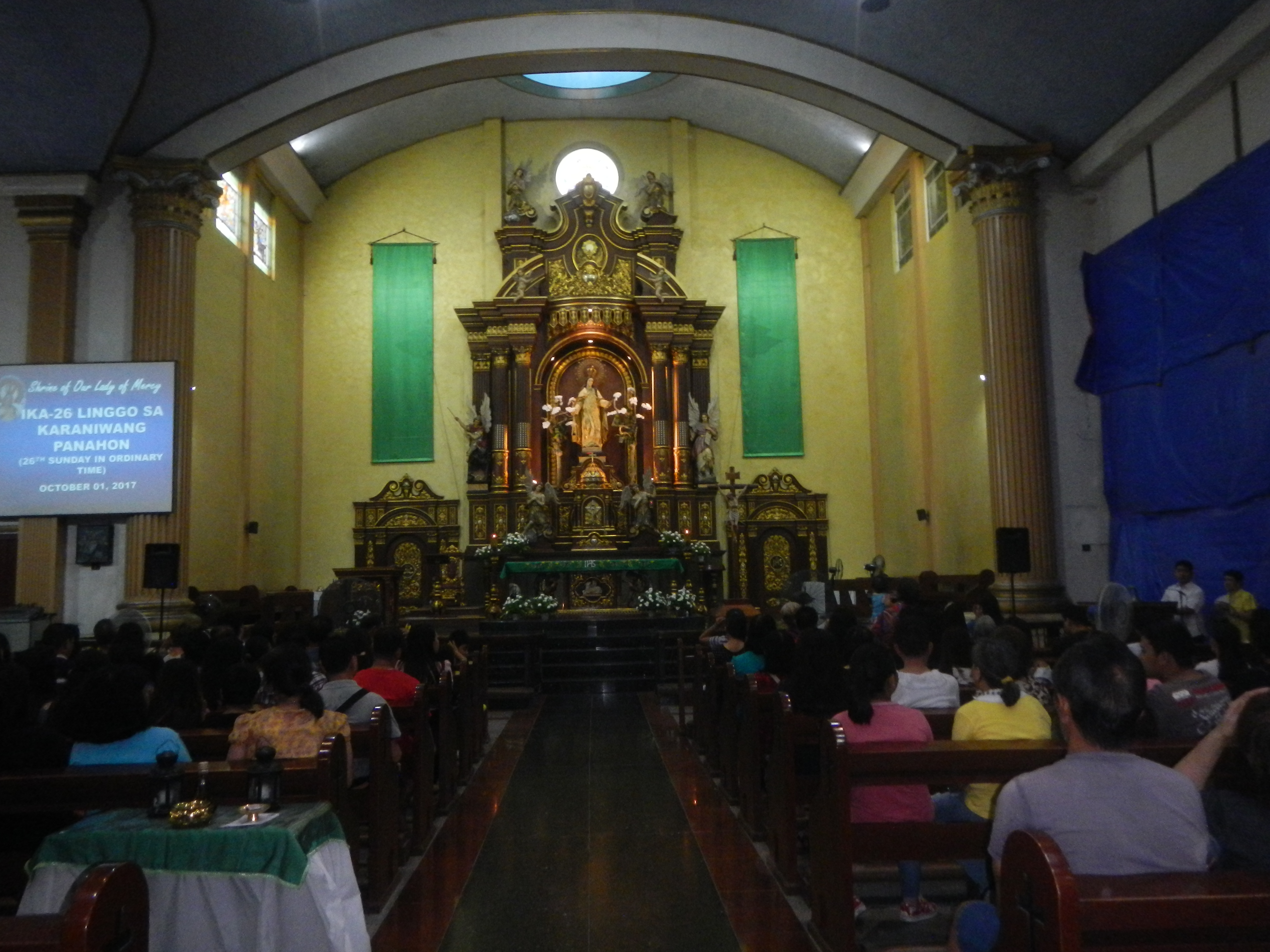
Church interior in 2017

== The Three Venerated Images of Nuestra Señora de la Merced de Novaliches ==
Within the National Shrine and Parish of Our Lady of Mercy in Novaliches, three sacred representations of Nuestra Señora de la Merced (Our Lady of Mercy) are venerated by the faithful. Each image plays a distinct role in the spiritual life of the parish community and in the broader devotion to the Blessed Virgin under this unique Mercedarian title.

These images include:

1. The centuries-old original image, known affectionately as La Verdadera,

2. The De Vestir image used in processions and feast day celebrations,

3. And the retablo or altar image, now widely recognized as the shrine's central figure of devotion.

=== "La Verdadera" ===
The original de tallado image presents the Blessed Virgin Mary as Our Lady of Mercy standing on a cloud with putti (little angels), both hands are raised and extended and previously holding a chain or the White Mercedarian Scapular, has long and wavy hair covered with a dainty veil wears a crown and the diagnostic doce estrellas. The original crown and halo were replaced with a 14-karat gold crown decorated with white pearls and diamonds and a gold-plated halo made of silver with pearls, diamonds and precious stones after the Pontifical Coronation Ceremony. The head of the Virgin is looking sideways. The Virgin wears a wig now, and the Mercedarian habit—the white habit and white scapular and a blue cape. The image is now securely enshrined on the side altar of the church after it received its pontifical and canonical crown and halo.

=== "De Vestir" ===
The second image is the de vestir processional image where it also shares the same elements of the original image of Nuestra Señora de la Merced de Novaliches from the vestments (richly embroidered white habit, white scapular, and blue cape), hands that are extended and raised holding the White Mercedarian Scapular and chain, wears a dainty veil and also wears a crown and the diagnostic doce estrellas.

=== "Retablo" ===
The third and probably the currently recognized image of the shrine is the altar image. The current altar image is a more than life-size de tallado image that deviates from the traditional iconography of the first two images of the Shrine. For this image, the Virgin wears the Mercedarian habit from the white robe, cape and scapular hold the White Mercedarian Scapular on her right and a scepter on the left. The Virgin looks sideways towards the left and has very modern Spanish features. The Virgin's hair is long and wavy topped with a crown and the diagnostic doce estrellas. Most recently, a smaller replica of the image was commissioned that would serve as a pilgrim image that would visit the communities within the vicinity of the shrine.

== Recent rectors and parish priests ==
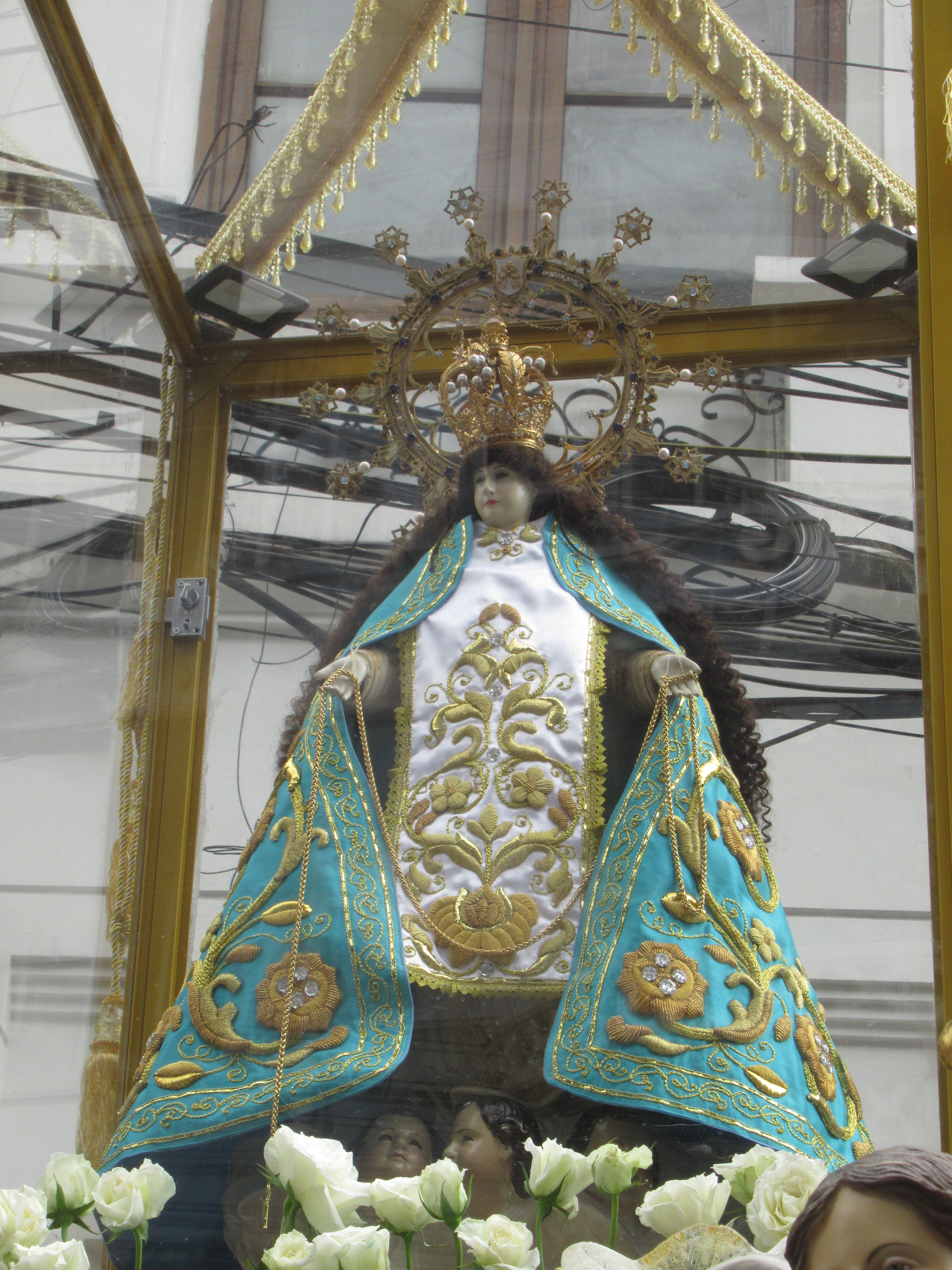
The original and pontifically crowned image during the 41st Intramuros Grand Marian procession last December 4, 2022

This list presents the recent rector and parish priests of the church recorded.

Name	Term
Rev. Fr. Aristeo M. De Leon	2026-present
Rev. Fr. Jose Peregrino V. Tomas	2019–2026
Rev. Fr. Antonio E. Labiao Jr.	2013–2019
Rev. Fr. Montecarlo M. Viloria	2008–2013
Rev. Fr. Miguelito G. Lagrimas	1998–2007
Rev. Msgr. Felipe Ocol	1988–1998
Rev. Msgr. Manuel Sebastian	1985–1988
Rev. Msgr. Ramon Vera	1975–1985
Rev. Fr. Pedro Hilario	1969–1974
Rev. Fr. Gerardo Bautista	1959–1969
Rev. Fr. Segundo Alto	1956–1958
Rev. Fr. Francisco Santiago	1942–1955
Rev. Fr. Nicolas San Juan	1933–1941
Rev. Msgr. Paterno Bernabe	1930–1932
Rev. Fr. Victor Reymundo	1928–1929
