= Immaculate Conception Parish Church (Santa Maria) =

Roman Catholic church in Bulacan, Philippines

Santa Maria Church
- Minor Basilica and Parish of La Purisima Concepcion
- La Basilica Menor de la Purísima Concepción
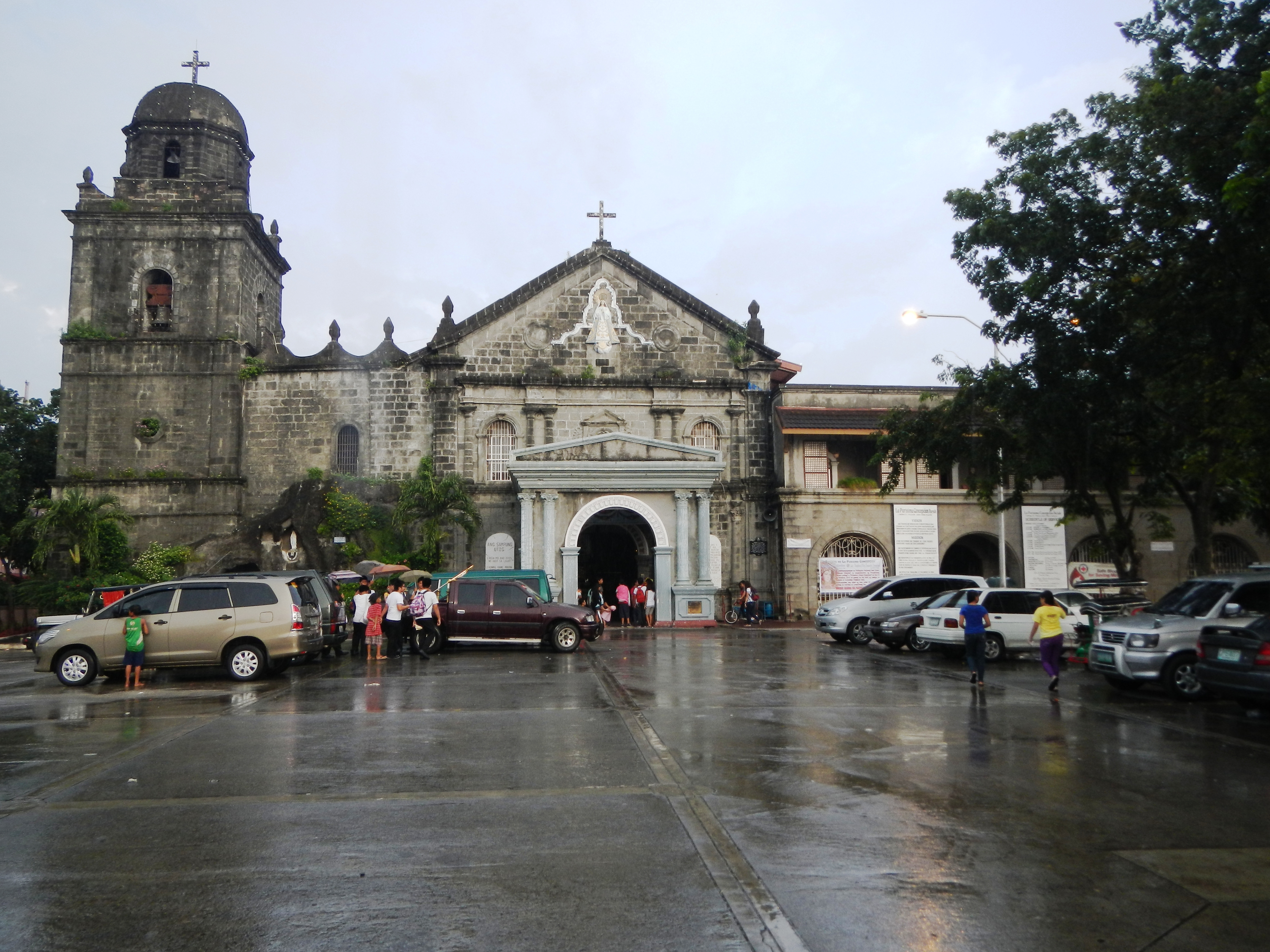
- Church façade and bell tower in 2014

- Location in Bulacan Location in Luzon Location in the Philippines
- 14°49′10″N 120°57′48″E
- Location: Santa Maria, Bulacan
- Country: Philippines
- Denomination: Roman Catholic
- Website: www.lapurisimaconcepcionparish.com

History
- Status: Minor Basilica
- Founded: 1793
- Founder(s): Francisco Javier and Tomás Marti
- Dedication: La Purísima Concepción

Architecture
- Functional status: Active
- Heritage designation: National Historical Landmark
- Designated: 1939
- Architectural type: Church building
- Style: Barn-style Baroque
- Completed: late 1800s

Specifications
- Materials: Volcanic Tuff or Adobe

Administration
- Archdiocese: Manila
- Diocese: Malolos
- Parish: Santa Maria

Clergy
- Rector: Alberto R. Suatengco
- Vicar(s): Arvin Ray Jimenez; Jonathan Paul Ventura

The Minor Basilica and Parish of La Purísima Concepción, locally known as Santa Maria Church, is a Roman Catholic Minor Basilica in Santa Maria, Bulacan, Philippines. The shrine is dedicated to the Blessed Virgin Mary of the Immaculate Conception. The church is the seat of the Episcopal Vicar of the Eastern District of the Diocese of Malolos.

Pope Francis granted a Pontifical decree of coronation to the enshrined Marian image on March 28, 2019. He later raised the shrine to the status of Minor Basilica via decree on March 21, 2021.

== Early history ==
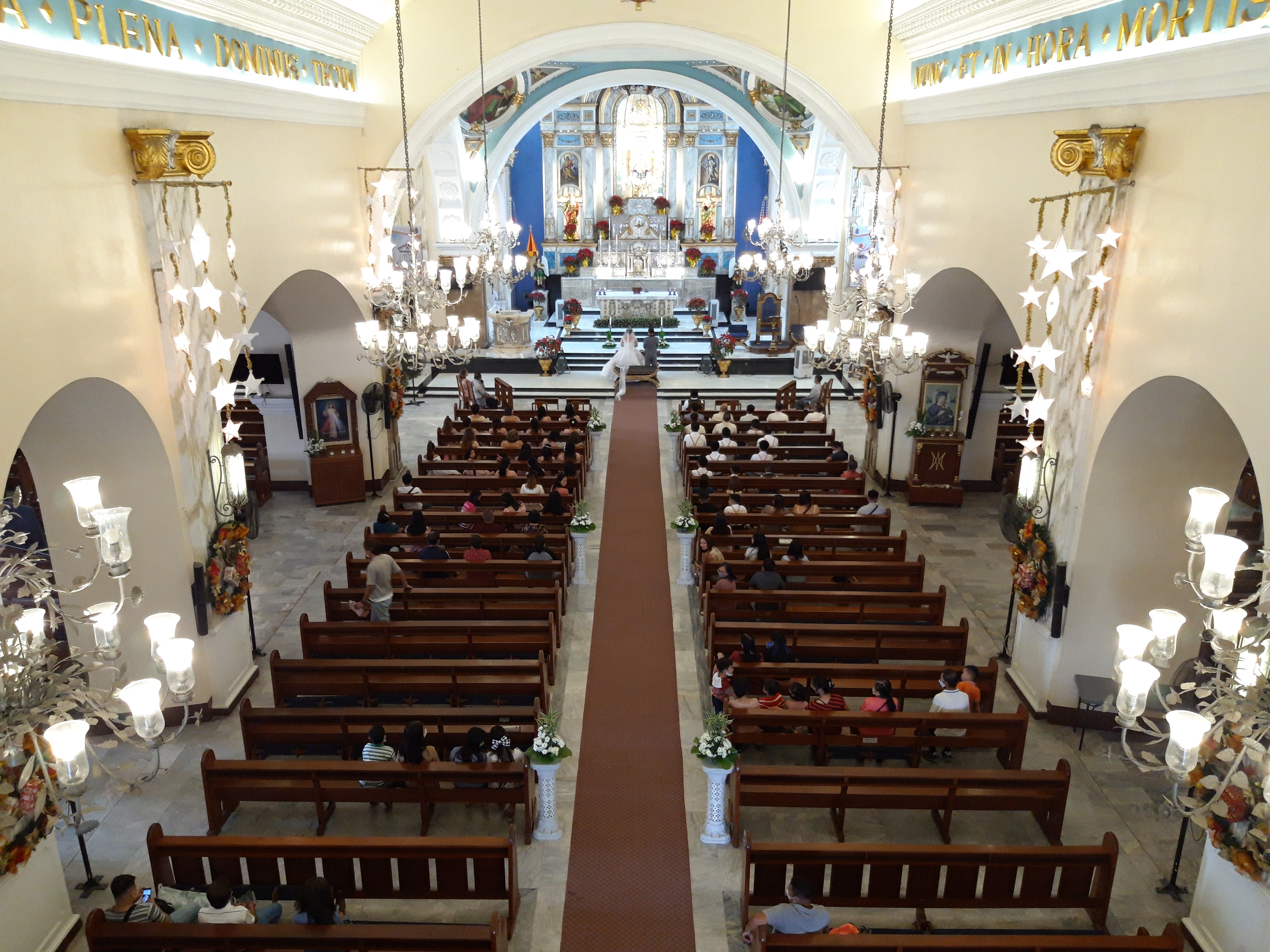
Church interior in 2022

Santa Maria Church was founded by Franciscan Friars as a visita by the priest Francisco Javier under the parish of Saint Martin of Tours in Bocaue. The materials was initially made of cogon and bamboo and later stronger materials. Then by 1792, Santa Maria de Pandi gained independence from its matrix and the construction of a bigger church commenced. The church was renamed Parroquia de la Purísima Concepción dedicated to the Virgin Mary.

== La Purisima Concepción de Santa Maria ==
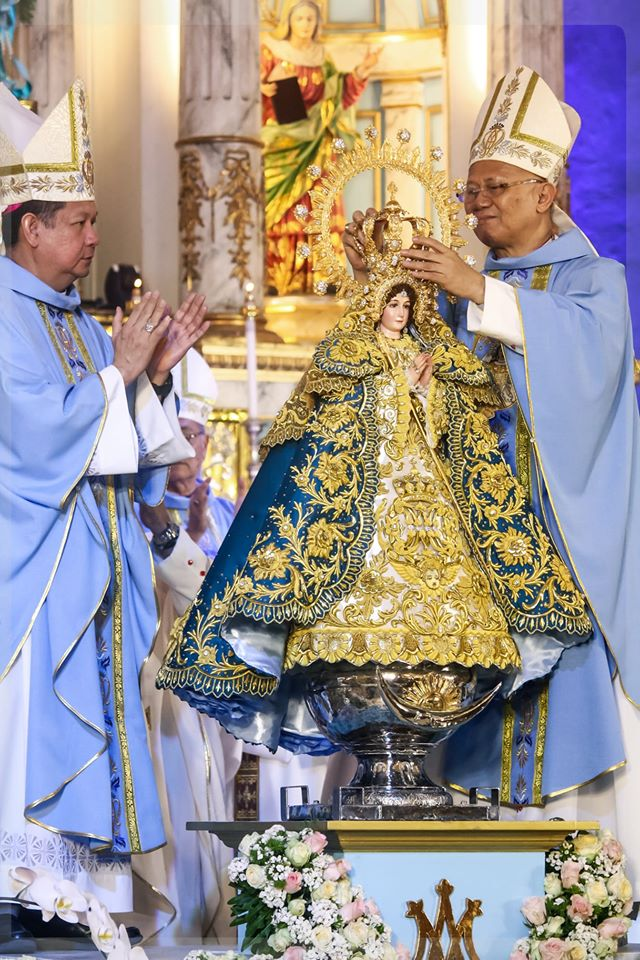
The canonical coronation of the image of La Purisima Concepcion on February 1, 2020

The church is home to an image of the Virgin Mary that is believed to be miraculous. There are two local legends as to how the image arrived in Santa Maria: first is that it was brought to the town by the Franciscan Friars, second is that it was sculpted out of wood from a galleon. The image has been stolen in the 1930s and was retrieved in Nueva Ecija by a man named Teofilo Ramirez who claimed that the Virgin Mary appeared in his dream and gave instructions as to where the image can be found. The image was returned to the town on a February and the townsfolk accordingly adjusted their feast day to the first Thursday of February except when its falls on February 2 (the feast of Our Lady of the Candles). The image was first granted an episcopal coronation on March 3, 2018, by Bishop Jose Oliveros of Malolos. On March 28, 2019, Pope Francis granted the canonical coronation of the image of La Purisima Concepcion. The coronation took place on February 1, 2020.

== Heritage designation ==
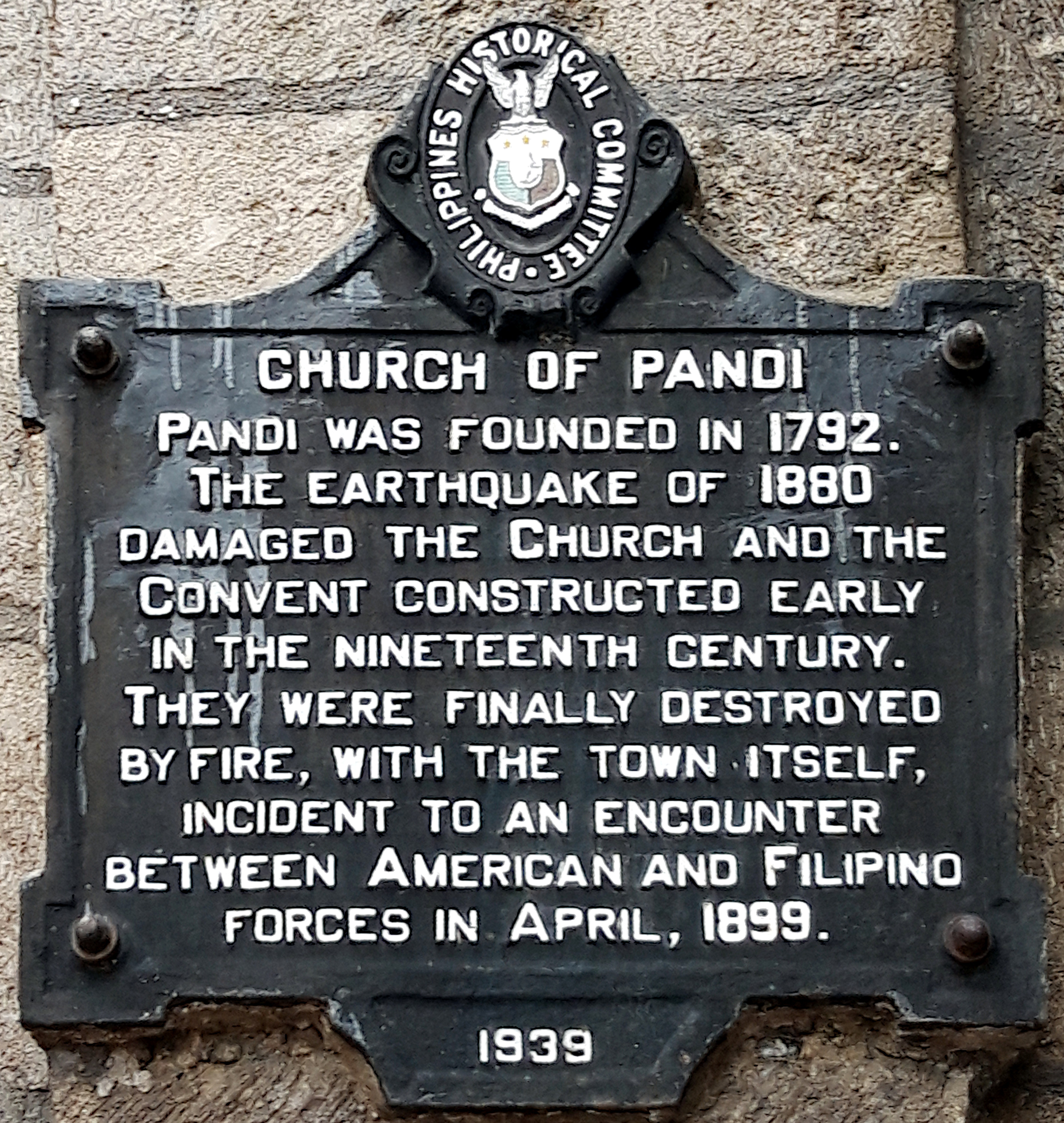
Church PHC historical marker installed in 1939

The facade of the church has a marker dated 1939 from the Philippines Historical Committee, now the National Historical Commission of the Philippines. The marker bears the name "Church of Pandi". The nearby town of Pandi has its own church, dedicated also to the Immaculate Conception, and is located about 5 kilometers from the minor basilica in Santa Maria, Bulacan.
