= Bosoboso Church =

Roman Catholic church in Rizal, Philippines

Boso-boso Church
- Nuestra Señora de la Anunciata Parish Church
- Twin Church of the Basilica of the Annunciation in Nazareth, Israel
- Parokya ng Mahal na Birhen ng Anunciata (Filipino); Iglesia Parroquial de Nuestra Señora de la Anunciata (Spanish)
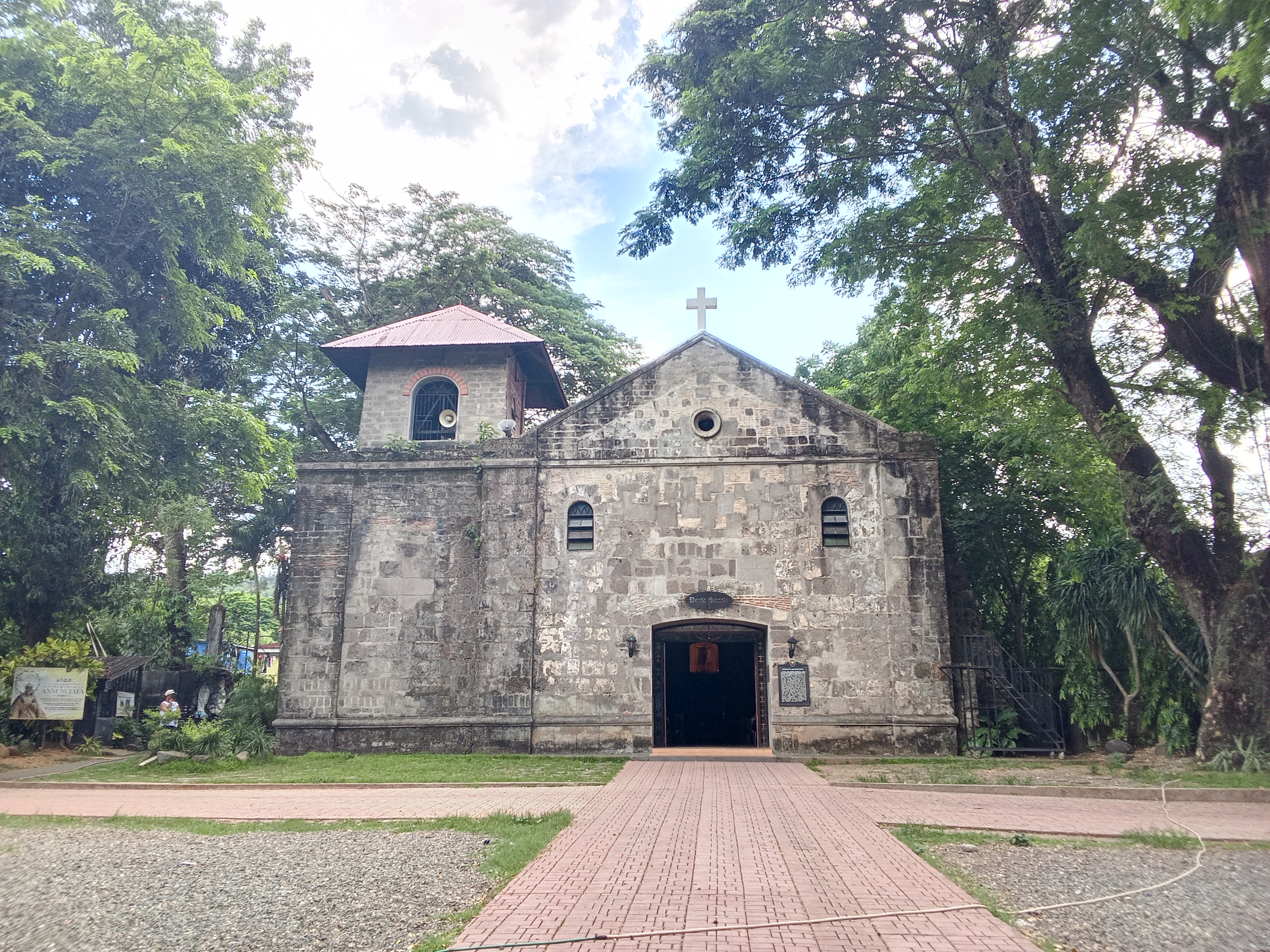
- Church facade in 2026

- Location in Luzon Location in the Philippines
- 14°38′22″N 121°14′17″E
- Location: Sitio Old Bosoboso, Barangay San Jose, 1870, Antipolo, Rizal
- Country: Philippines
- Denomination: Roman Catholic
- Tradition: Roman Rite
- Religious order: Camillians

History
- Status: Parish Church
- Founded: 1669
- Founder: Franciscan Friars
- Dedication: Nuestra Señora de la Annunciata

Architecture
- Functional status: Active
- Heritage designation: Marked Structure (of Historical Significance) by the National Historical Commission of the Philippines
- Architectural type: Church building
- Groundbreaking: 1700; 326 years ago 1995; 31 years ago (Restored)
- Demolished: 1880; 146 years ago (Ruins)

Specifications
- Materials: Bricks and Tuff stone

Administration
- Metropolis: Manila
- Diocese: Antipolo

Clergy
- Bishop: Ruperto Cruz Santos
- Priest(s): Rev. Fr. John Jay Magpusao, MI

The Nuestra Señora de la Anunciata Parish Church (Spanish: Iglesia Parroquial de Nuestra Señora de la Anunciata), commonly known as Boso-boso Church or Boso-Boso Church, is a Roman Catholic parish church located in Sitio Old Boso-Boso, Barangay San Jose in Antipolo, Rizal, Philippines. It is under the jurisdiction of the Diocese of Antipolo.

== History ==
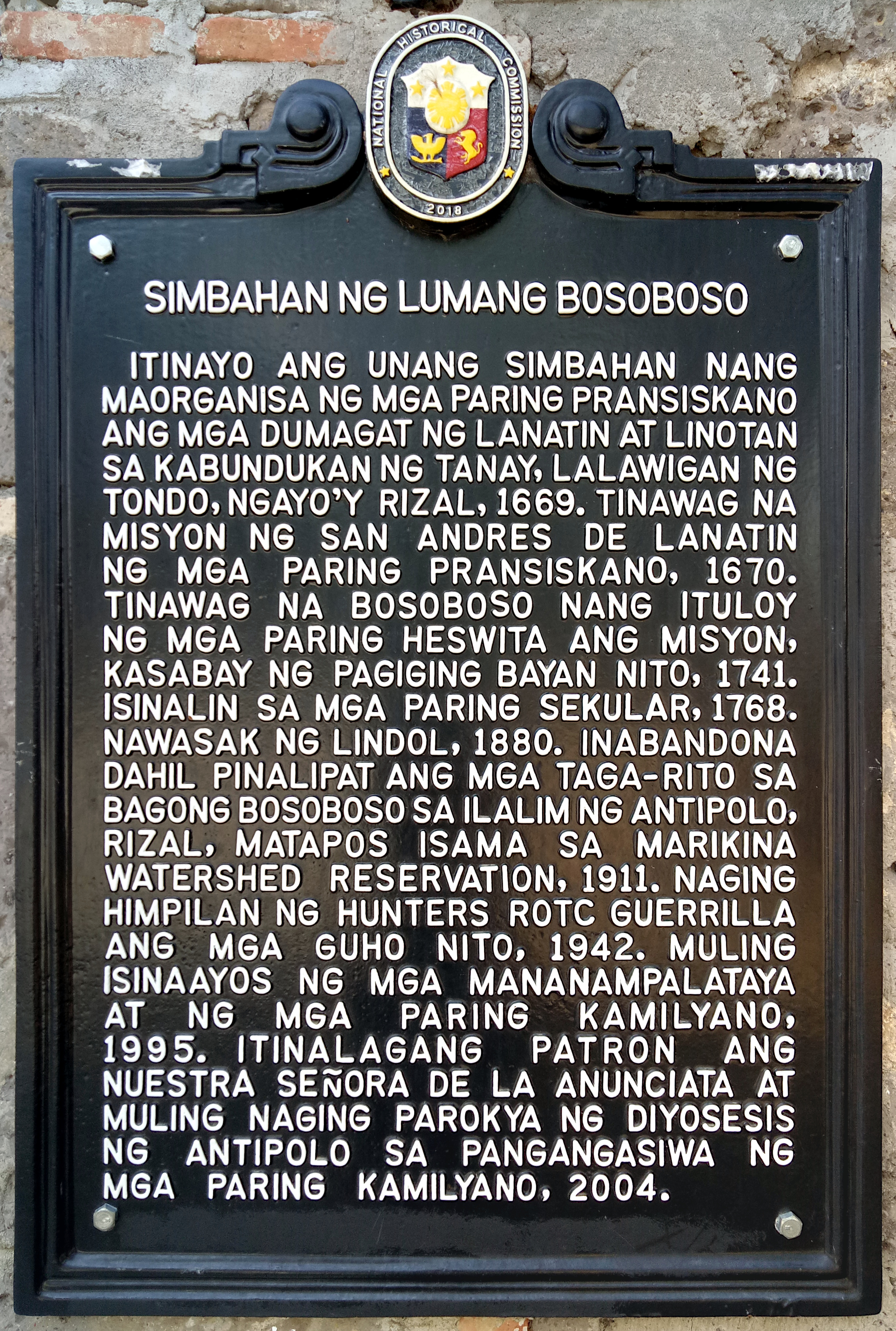
2018 NHCP marker, replacing the previous one

The first church was built as a mission church by the Franciscans in 1669. Originally, it served the Dumagat people of Lanatin and Linotan in the mountains of modern-day Rizal province. The Jesuits eventually took over the mission and the church in 1741. It was turned over to secular priests in 1768 when the Jesuits were expelled from the Philippines and other Spanish realms.

In 1880, an earthquake caused significant damage to the church. Owing to the dwindling population in the area, the damaged portions of the church were not rebuilt.

In 1930, the Americans planned to build a dam in the surrounding area, and the remaining inhabitants were ordered to resettle elsewhere. The project was eventually abandoned due to a discovered fault in the region, yet people did not return until the time of the Japanese Occupation. Whatever remained of the structure was subsequently razed to the ground by the Japanese, leaving only the lower portion of the original façade intact.

As the area was eventually resettled, administration of the parish was taken over by the Order of the Ministers of the Infirm, also known as the Camillians in 1986, who helped organize rebuilding of the church. The restoration was completed in 1995, preserving the ruins of the façade, with the new portions built as close as possible to the simple, sparse architecture of the original.

The Bosoboso Church was plot setting for the episode 'Ukay-Ukay' of the 2009 horror film Shake, Rattle & Roll 11.

On June 29, 2024, the ceremonial presentation of the stone relic and documents for the Spiritual Twinning of the church with the Basilica of the Annunciation in Nazareth took place, which was received by the parish priest, Fr. John Jay Magpusao, MI. The solemn declaration took place on December 18 of the same year, presided by Archbishop Charles John Brown, Papal Nuncio to the Philippines and with the presence of Fr. Evan Paul Villanueva, MI, the Provincial Superior of the Camillians in the Philippine Province..

On January 9, 2025, Pope Francis through the Dicastery for Divine Worship and the Discipline of the Sacraments, issued a decree granting the pontifical-canonical coronation of the venerated Marian image of Nuestra Señora de la Annunciata. On May 25, 2025, The image was canonically crowned by Bishop Ruperto Cruz Santos, Bishop of Antipolo.

== Gallery ==
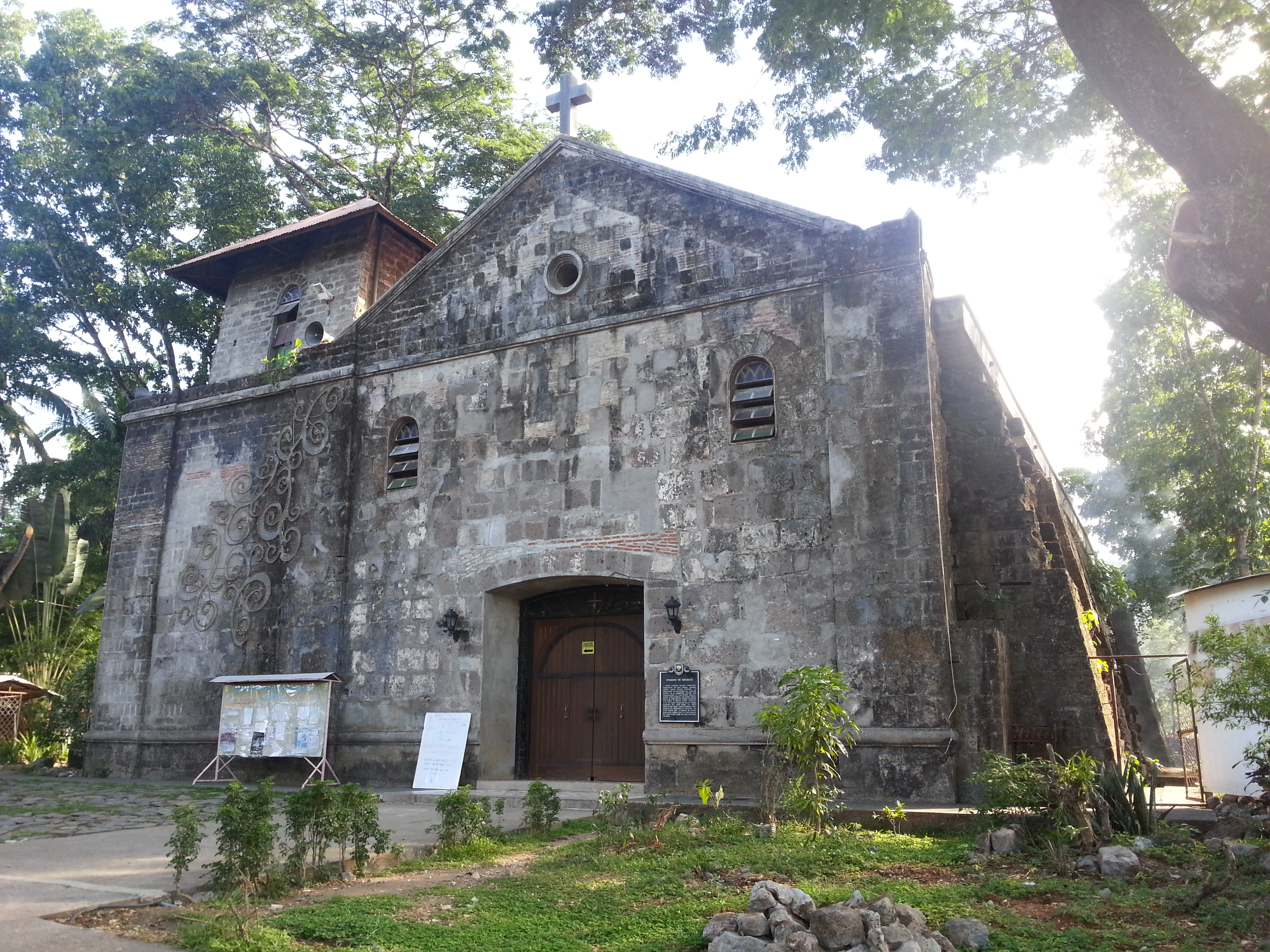
Restored façade, incorporating the original ruins

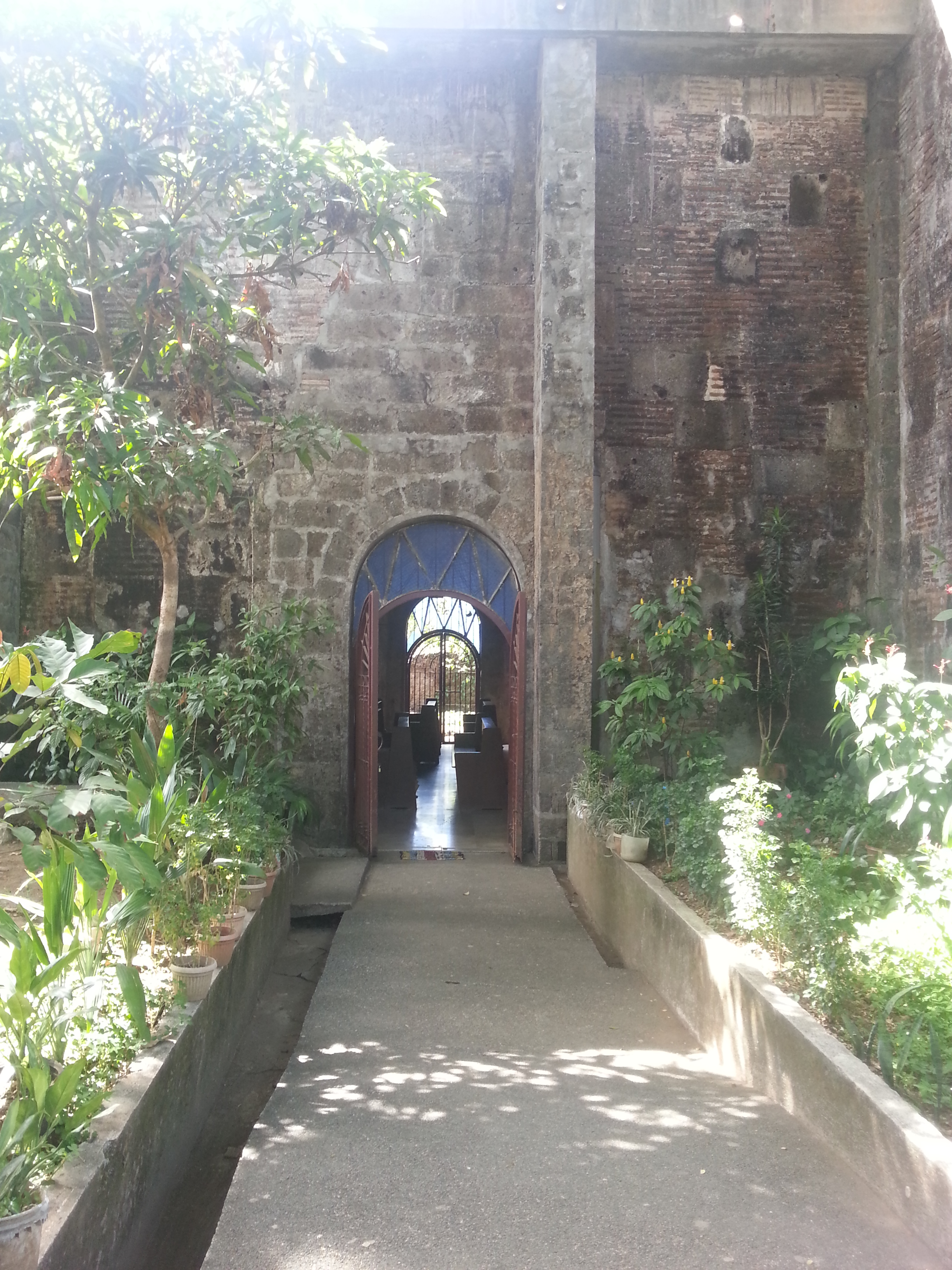
Arch portal, left side

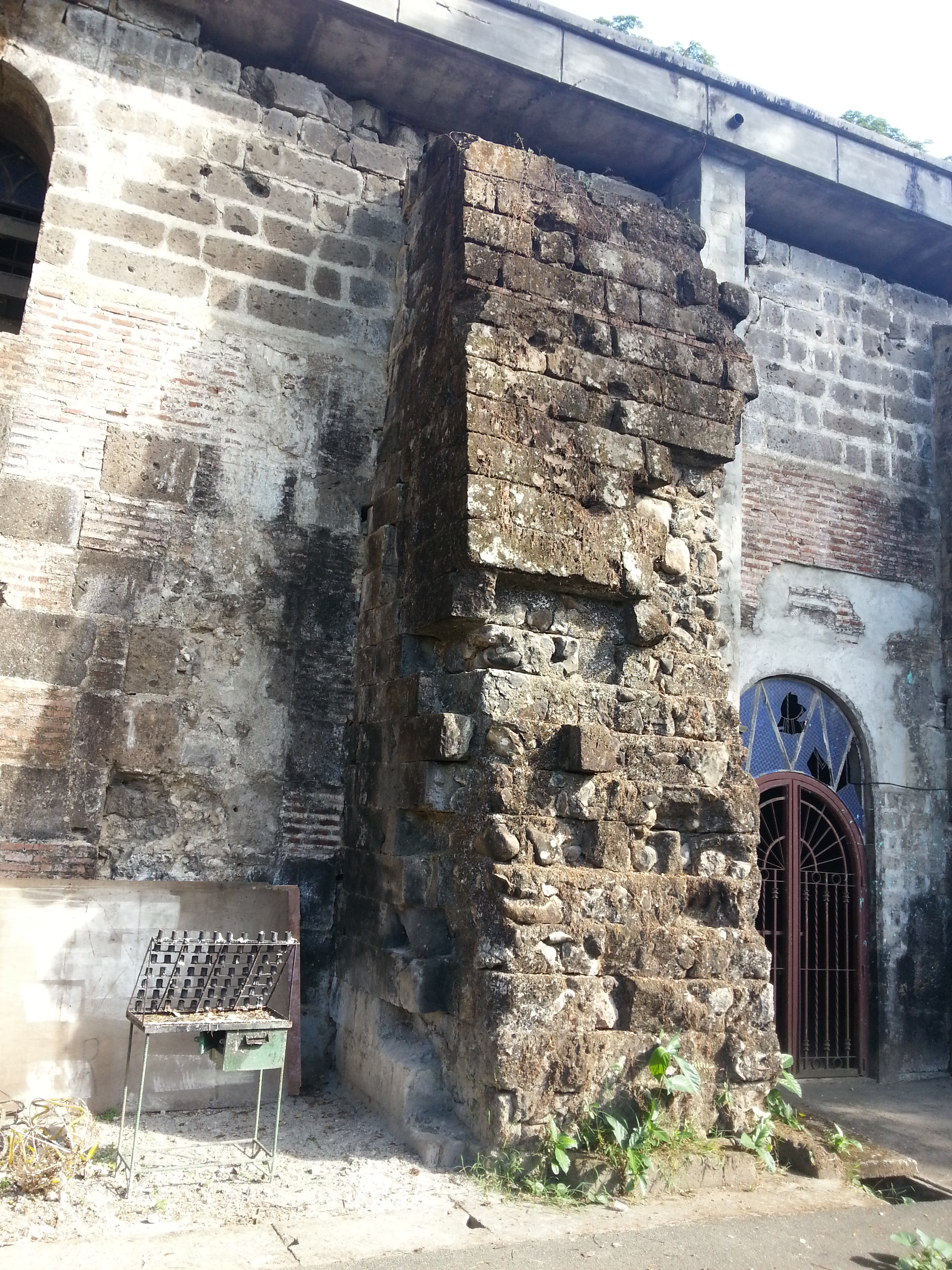
Buttress

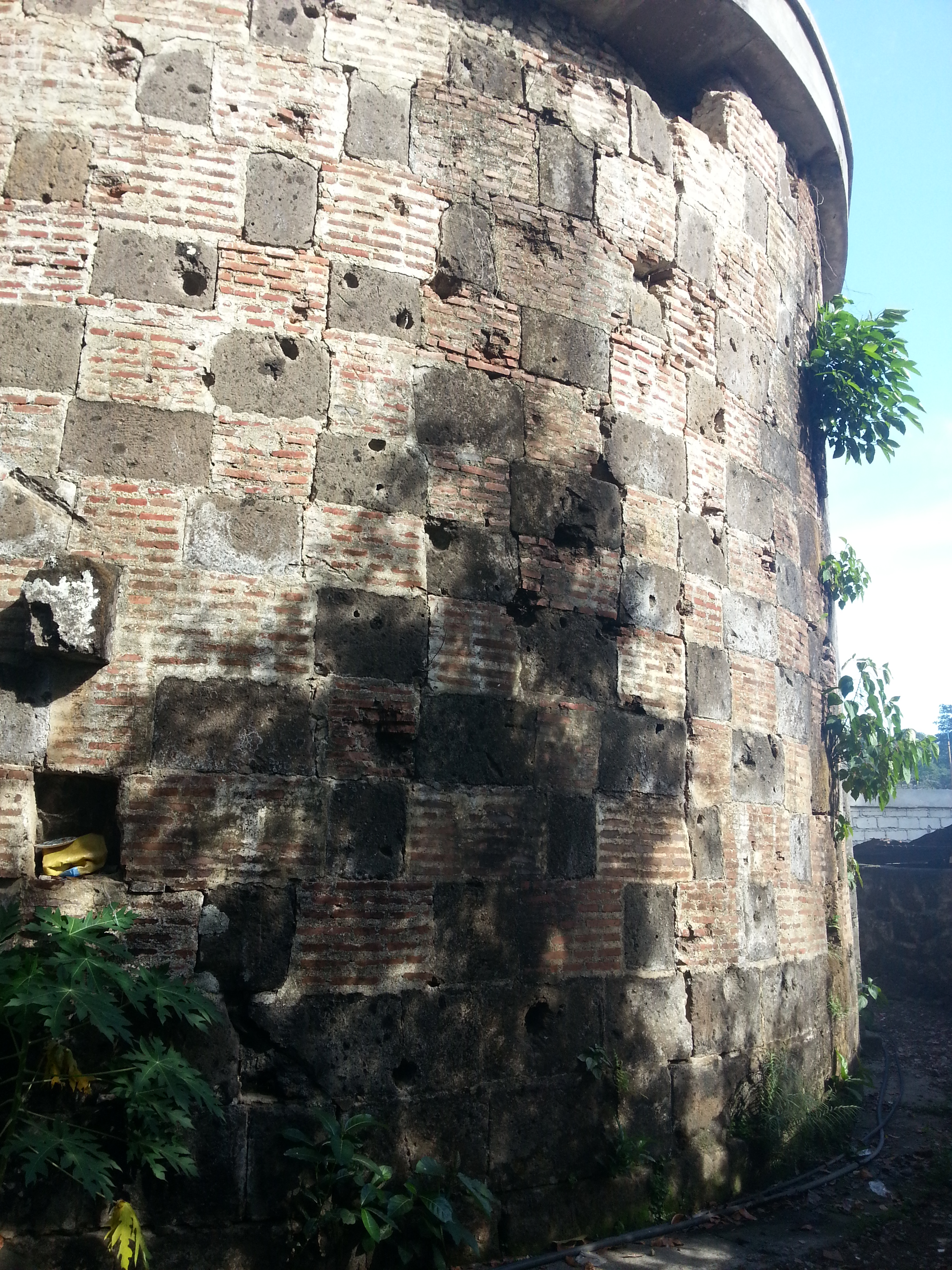
Wall of the apse

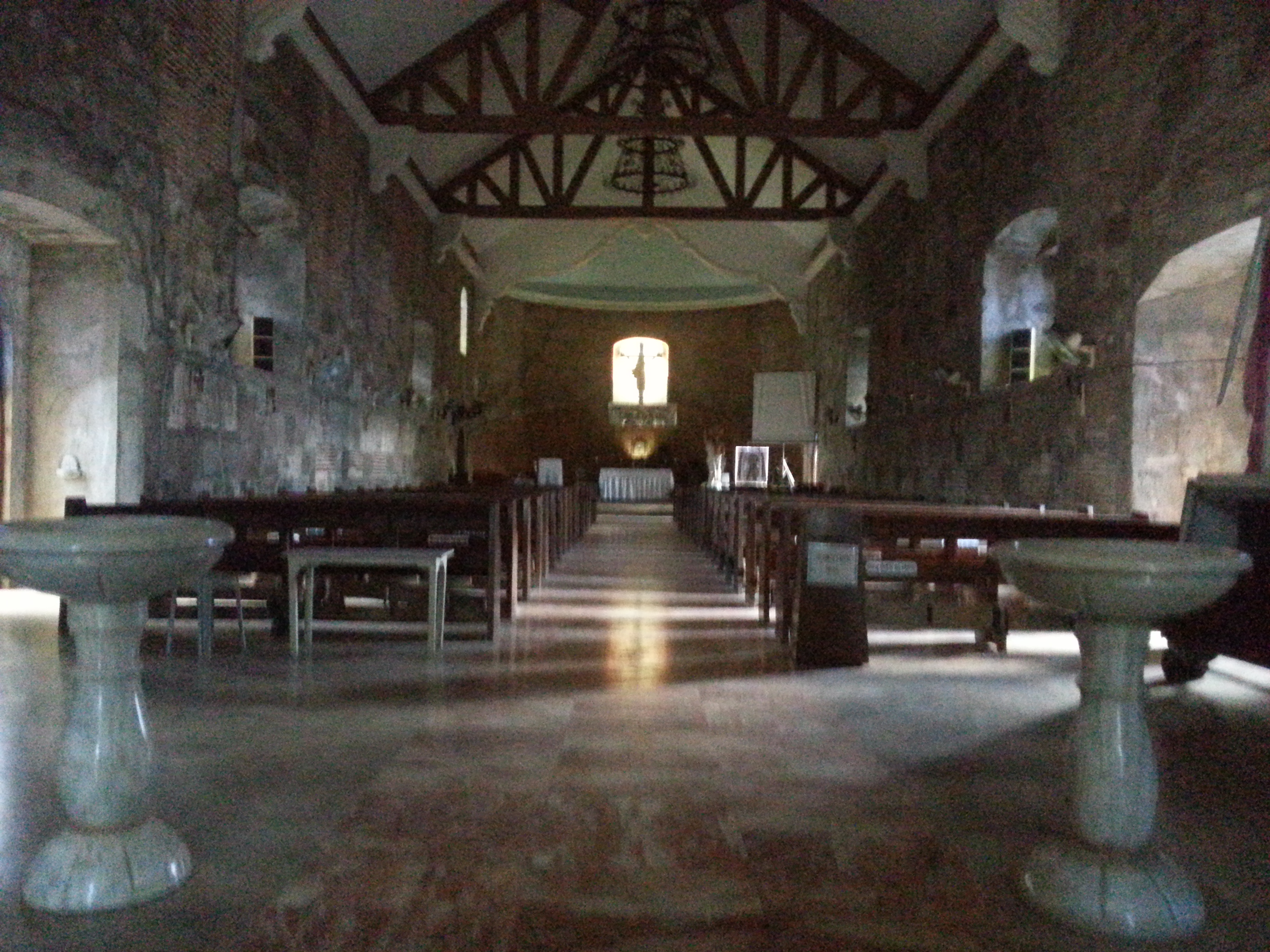
Narthex

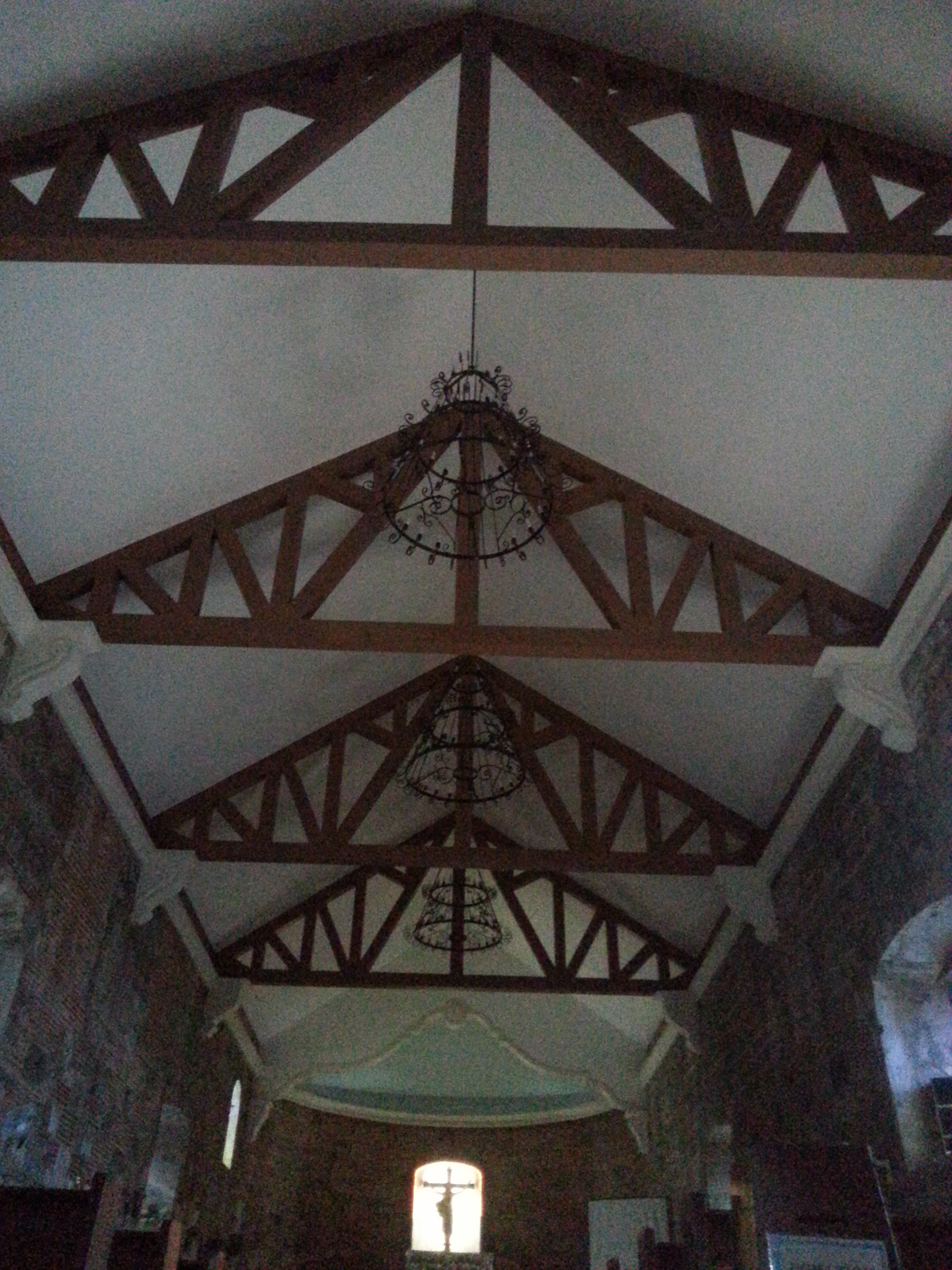
Ceiling, with gables

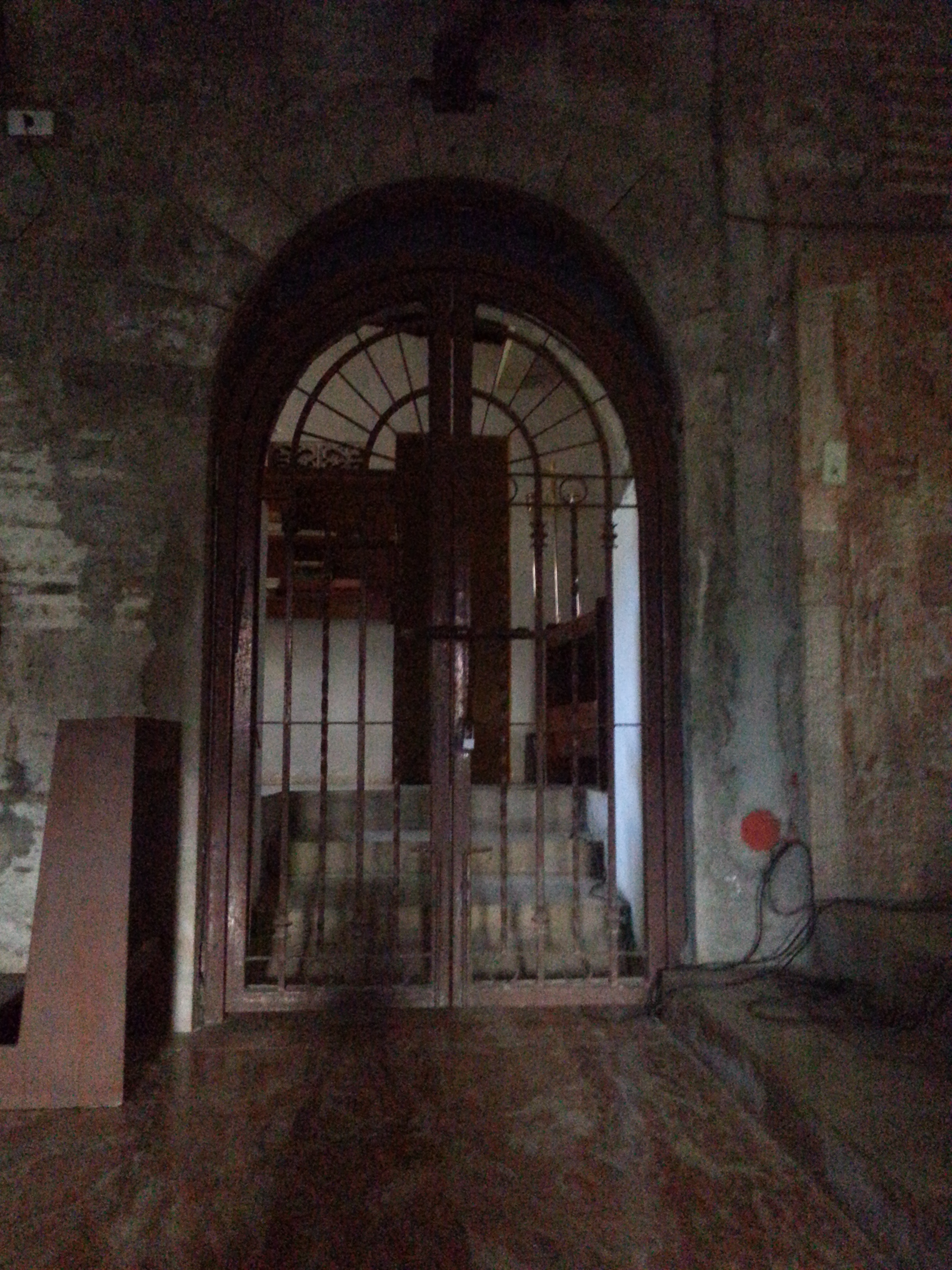
Arched portal near the sanctuary

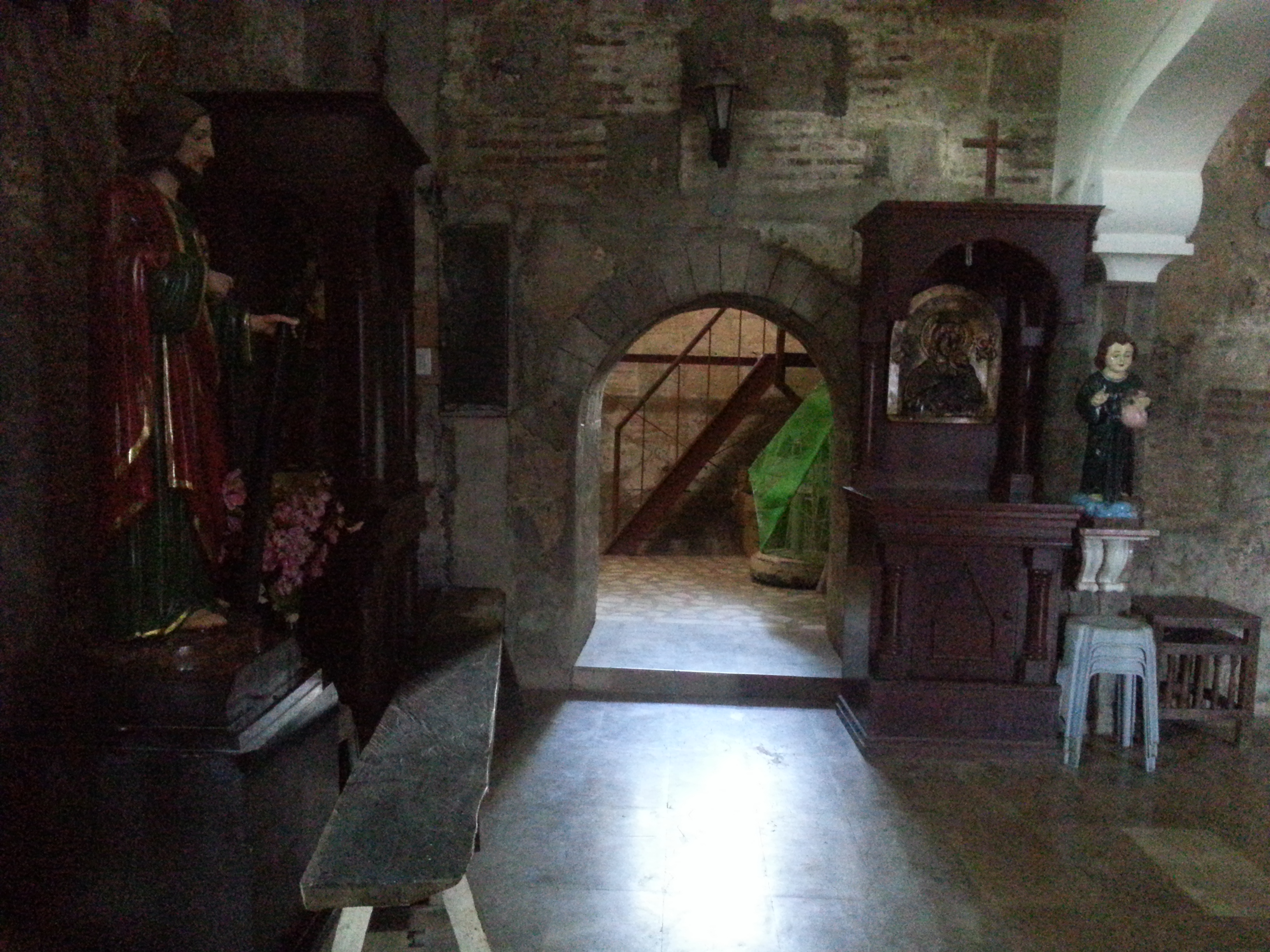
Gate and staircase leading to the belfry

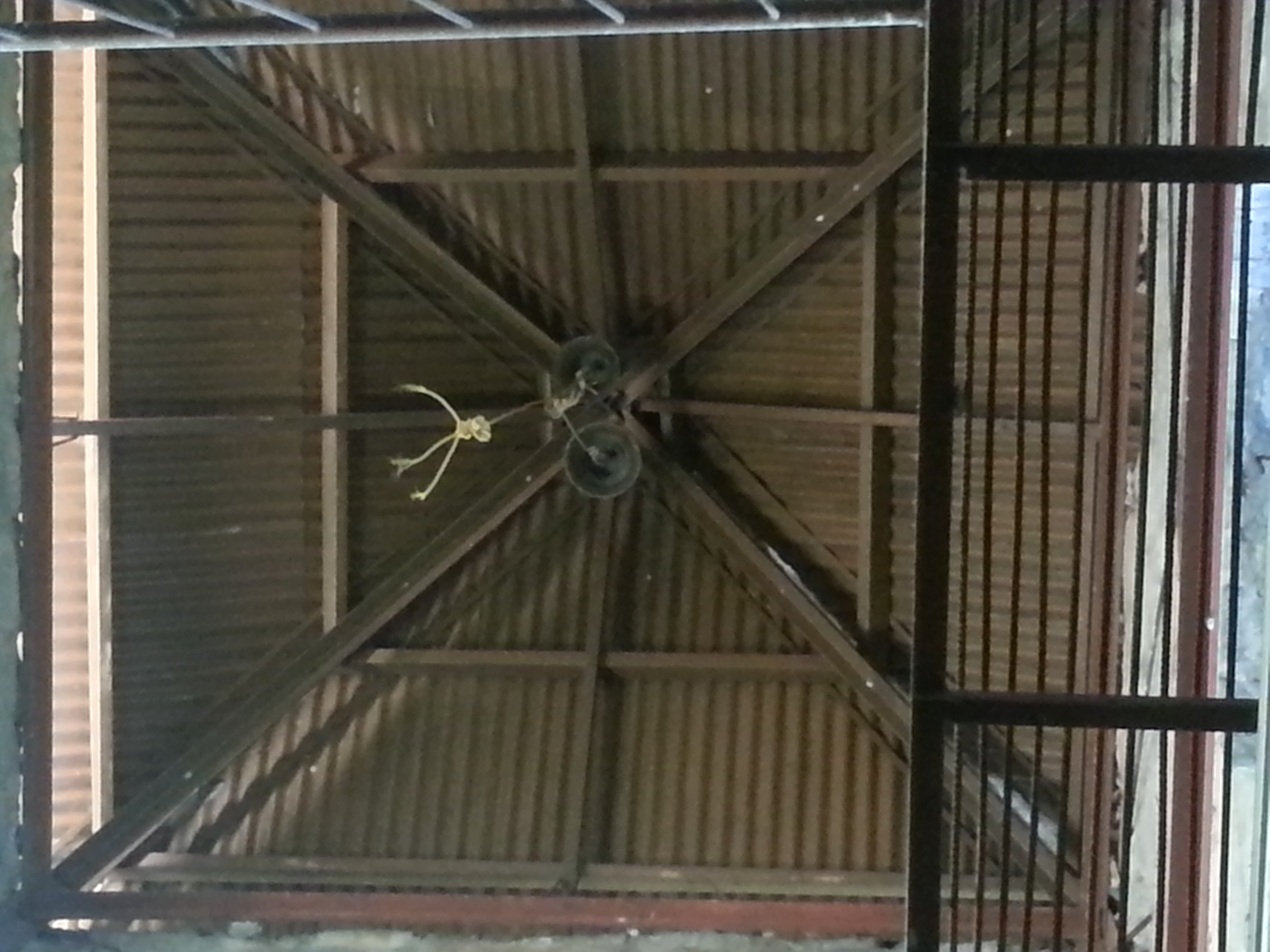
Church's two bells suspended from the belfry

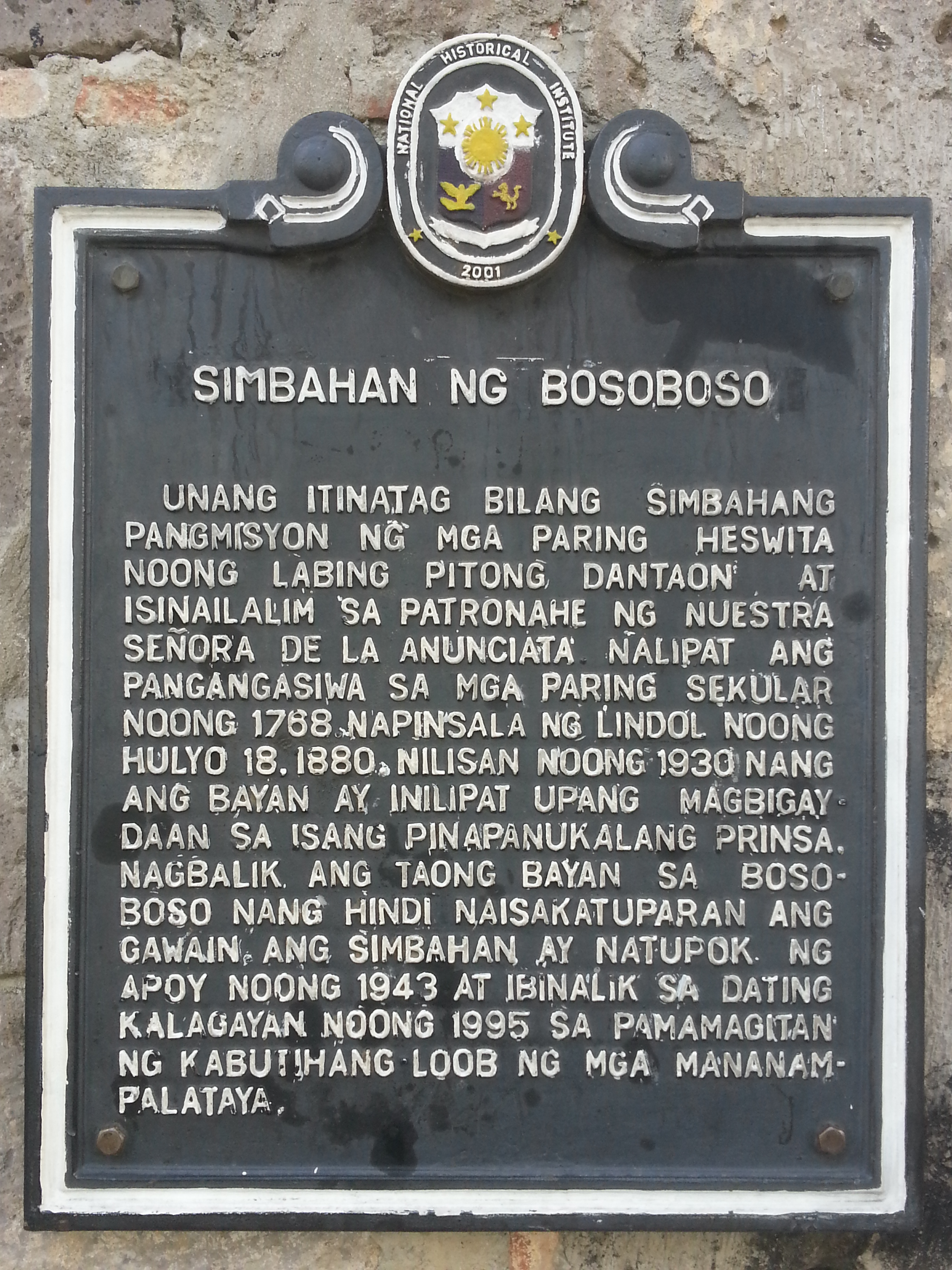
2001 historical marker by the NHCP

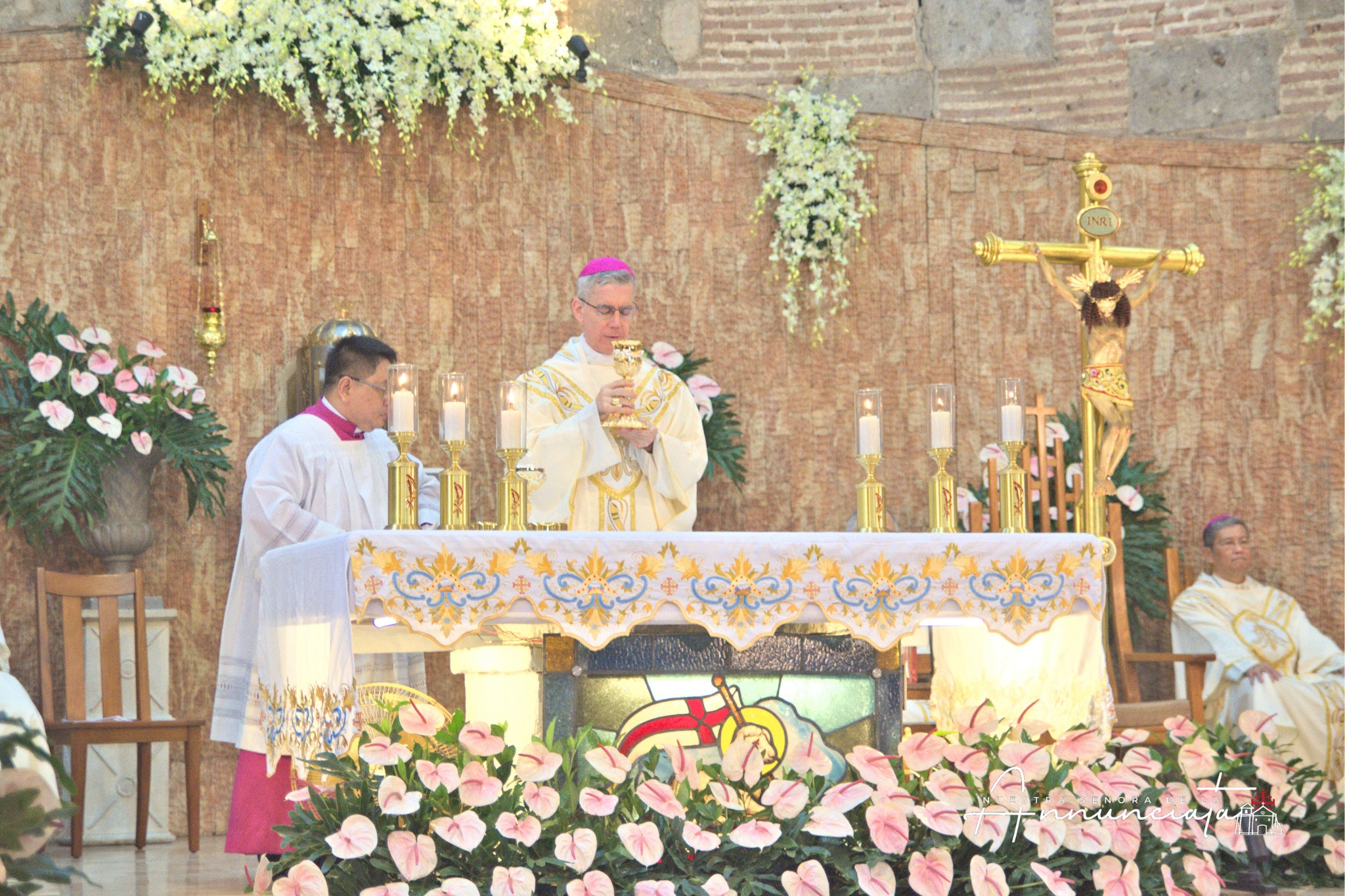
Modern, freestanding altar

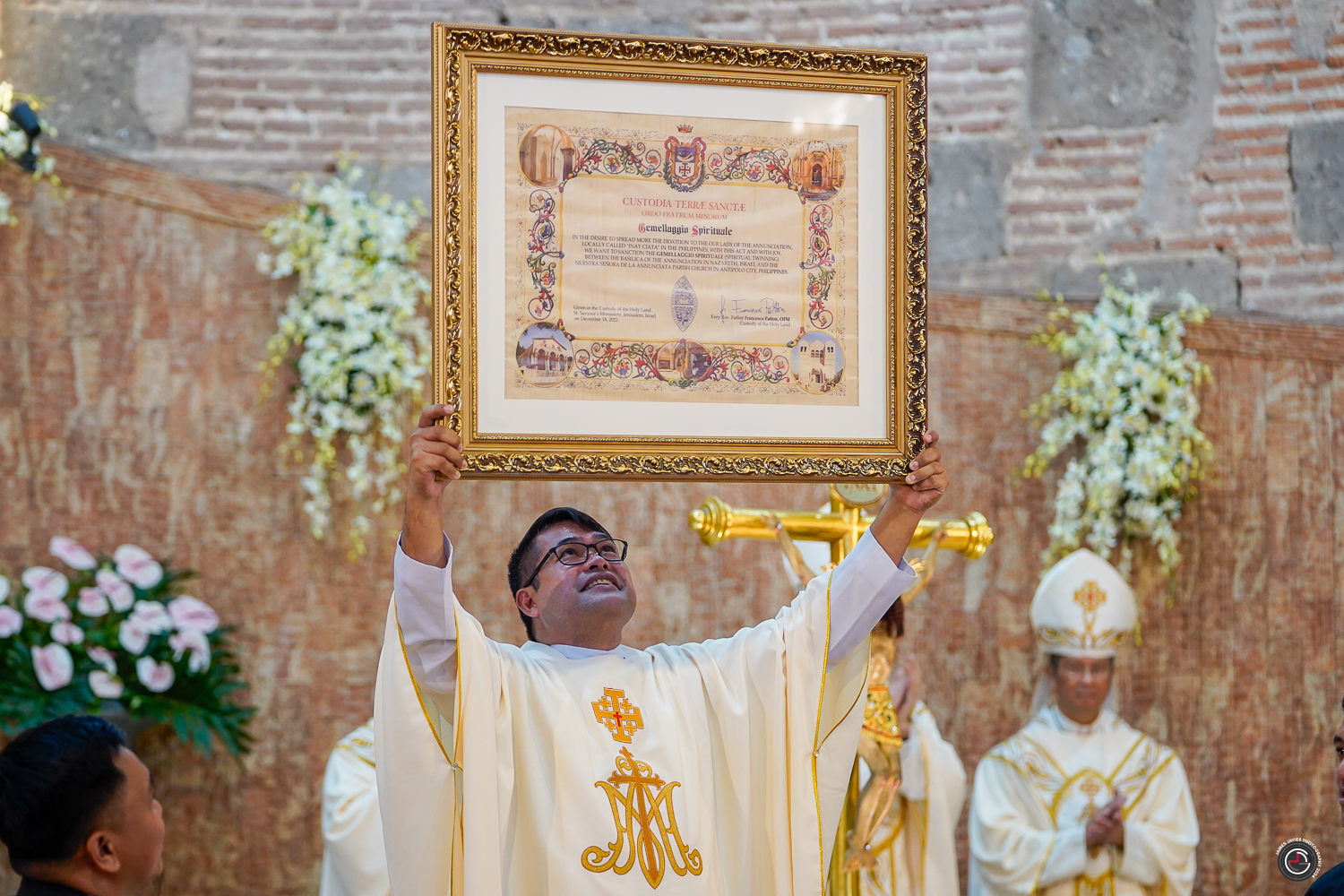
Twin Church of the Basilica of the Annunciation in Nazareth, Israel

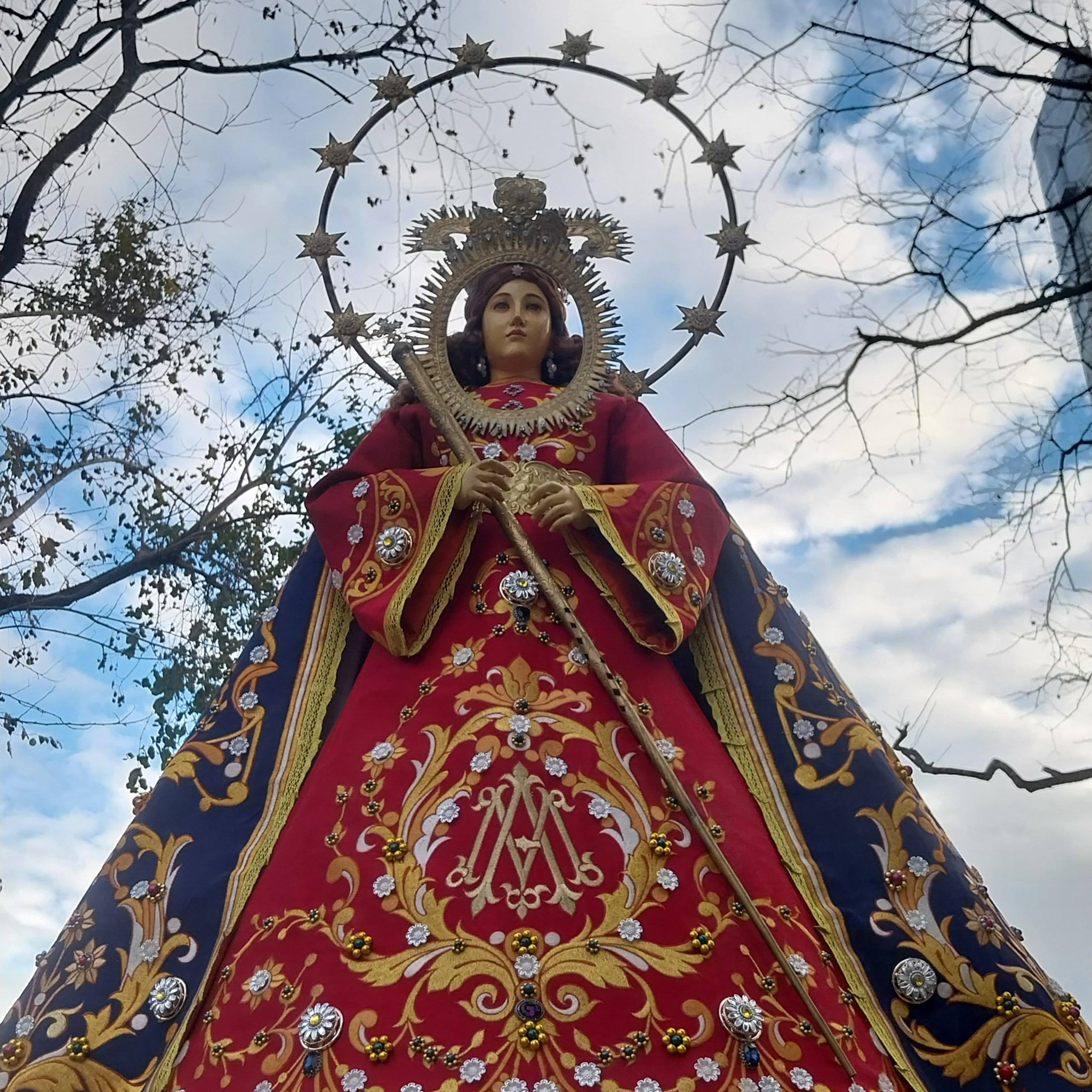
The venerated image of Nuestra Señora de la Annunciata or 'Inay Ciata' as her devotees call her. Pontifically crowned on May 25, 2025

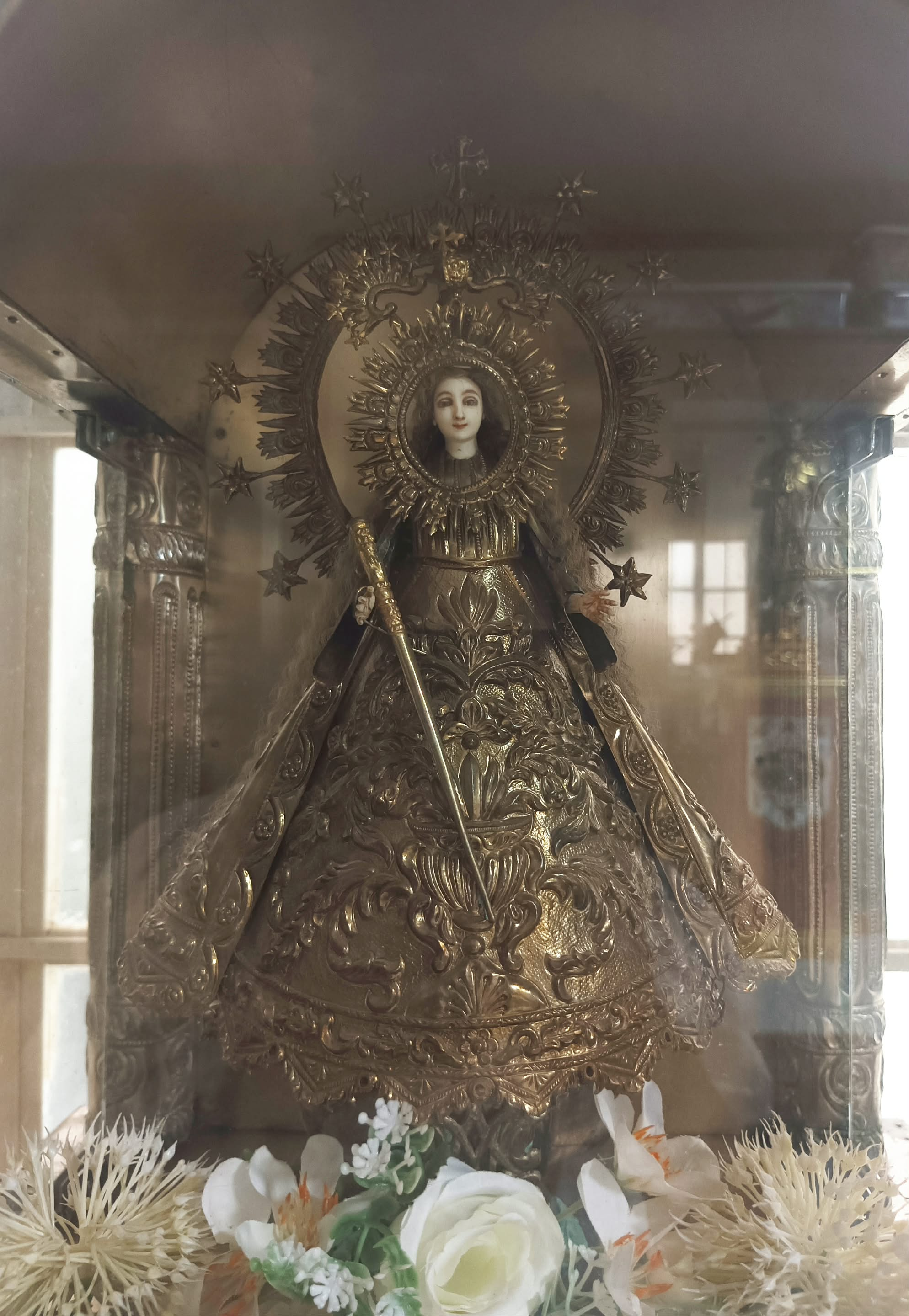
The original ivory image of Nuestra Señora de la Anunciata de Bosoboso located at church sacristy
