= Ainhoa (given name) =

Female given name

- Chapel of Our Lady of Aranzazu in Ainhoa
- Pronunciation: Basque: [ai.no.a]
- Gender: Female
- Language: Basque

Origin
- Origin: Ainhoa, Pyrénées-Atlantiques
- Region of origin: Basque Country

Other names
- Alternative spelling: Ainoa

Ainhoa (Basque pronunciation: [ai.no.a]) is a Basque feminine given name deriving from the commune of Ainhoa, Pyrénées-Atlantiques, France, which houses a Marian sanctuary to Our Lady of Aranzazu. Local shepherds who could not travel to the Sanctuary of Arantzazu in Gipuzkoa were able to visit the sanctuary in Ainhoa, which gave rise to the given name in the Basque Country.

== People ==
- Ainhoa Arteta (born 1964), Spanish soprano
- Ainhoa Artetxe (born 1993), Spanish actress
- Ainhoa Artolazábal (born 1972), Spanish road cyclist
- Ainhoa Campabadal (born 2003), Spanish swimmer
- Ainoa Campo (born 1996), Spanish footballer
- Ainhoa Cantalapiedra (born 1980), Spanish singer
- Aïnhoa Dot-Espinosa (born 2005), French rhythmic gymnast
- Ainoa Gómez (born 2007), Spanish footballer
- Ainhoa Goñi (born 1979), Spanish tennis player
- Ainhoa Hernández (born 1994), Spanish handball player
- Ainhoa Ibarra (born 1968), Spanish alpine skier
- Ainhoa Lameiro (born 2000), Spanish slalom canoeist
- Ainhoa Larrañaga (born 2000), Spanish actress and singer
- Ainhoa Marín (born 2001), Spanish footballer
- Ainhoa Molina (born 1997), Spanish politician
- Ainhoa Murúa (born 1978), Spanish triathlete
- Ainhoa Pinedo (born 1983), Spanish race walker
- Ainhoa Santamaría (born 1980), Spanish actress
- Ainhoa Tirapu (born 1984), Spanish footballer
- Ainhoa Vicente (born 1995), Spanish footballer
