= Ainhoa =

Ainhoa may refer to:

- Ainhoa (given name)
- Ainhoa, Pyrénées-Atlantiques, France
