= San Mateo Church (Rizal) =

Roman Catholic church in Rizal, Philippines

- National Shrine and Parish of Our Lady of Aránzazu
- Parroquia de Nuestra Señora de Aránzazu (Spanish)
- Simbahan ng San Mateo (Filipino)
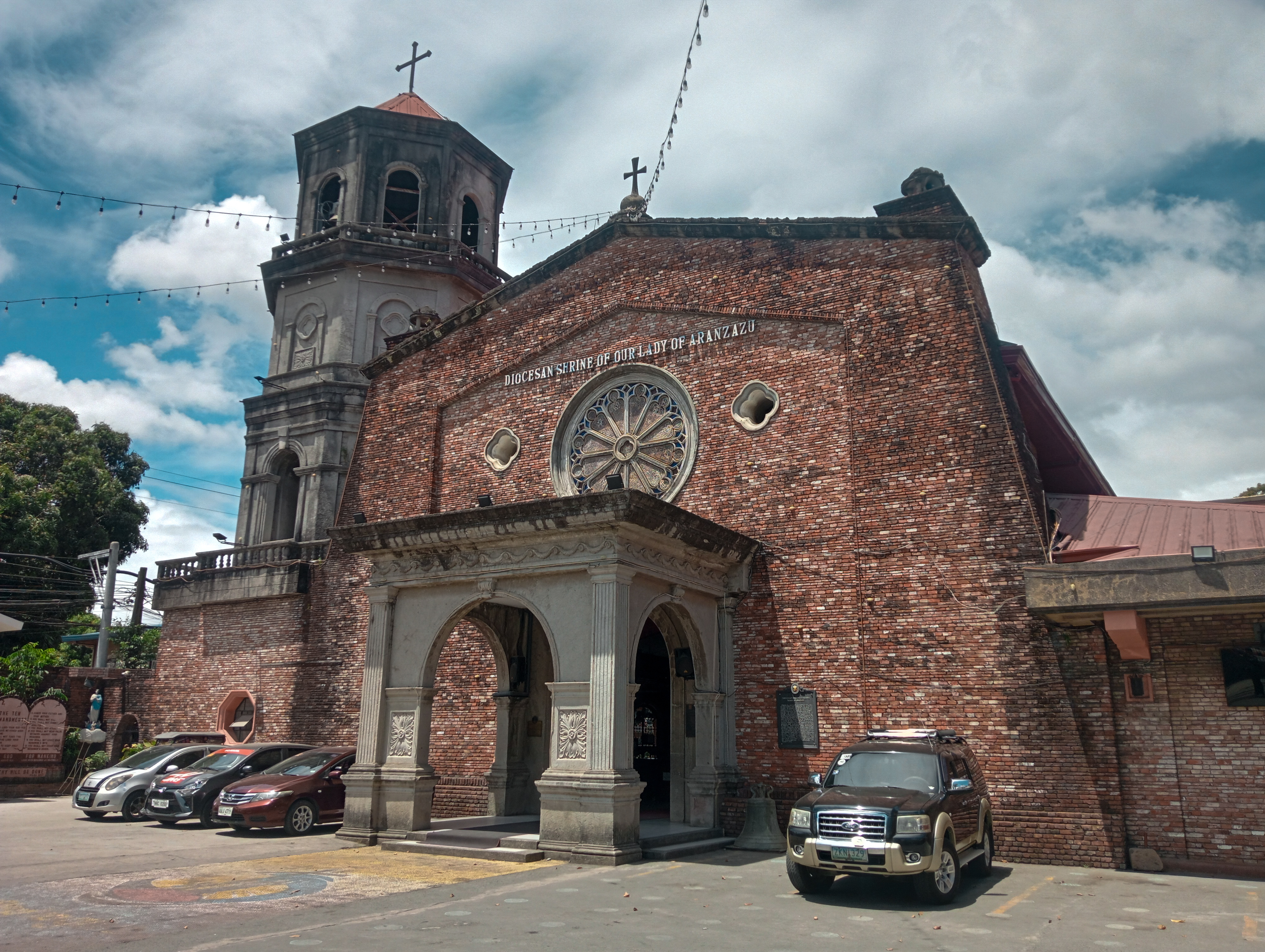
- The shrine’s façade in March 2024

- Location in Luzon Location in the Philippines
- 14°41′45″N 121°07′03″E
- Location: General Luna Avenue Barangay Guitnang Bayan I, San Mateo, Rizal
- Country: Philippines
- Denomination: Roman Catholic
- Website: https://aranzazushrine.ph/

History
- Status: Active
- Founded: 1596
- Founder: Augustinian friars
- Dedication: Our Lady of Aranzazu
- Dedicated: 1705

Architecture
- Functional status: National shrine and parish church
- Architectural type: Church building
- Style: Modern Romanesque
- Completed: 1715 (first church); 1887 (current church)
- Demolished: 1863 (first church)

Specifications
- Materials: Brick, concrete

Administration
- Province: Manila
- Metropolis: Manila
- Archdiocese: Manila
- Diocese: Antipolo
- Deanery: Vicariate of Our Lady of Aranzazu
- Parish: Our Lady of Aranzazu Parish

Clergy
- Rector: Rev. Fr. Rodrigo Eguia

The National Shrine of Our Lady of Aranzazu, also known as San Mateo Church, is a Roman Catholic parish church situated in the municipality of San Mateo, Rizal, Philippines. It is under the jurisdiction of the Diocese of Antipolo. The church is dedicated to Our Lady of Aránzazu, a Marian title originating from Oñati, Basque Country, Spain.

== History ==
The town of San Mateo, Rizal was established in 1596 by Augustinian friars. The first parish was built on August 29, 1596, and was dedicated to Saint Matthew the Apostle, after whom the town was named.

On December 6, 1696, the Jesuits replaced the Augustinians and gained control of the town. In 1705, a Jesuit priest named Juan de Echazabal changed the town's patron saint from St. Matthew to Our Lady of Aranzazu.

In 1715, the first concrete church was built on the current site of the present church. The image of Our Lady of Aránzazu was brought to the Philippines by a Spanish captain from the Basque region of Spain.

The first church was later destroyed by an earthquake in 1863 that devastated Manila and some towns of Morong but was rebuilt in 1887. It was again damaged twice in World War II (1942) and 1990. In 1993, the church was repaired and refurnished.

On July 16, 2004, the church was declared a Diocesan Shrine by the Diocese of Antipolo. On January 25, 2025, the Catholic Bishops' Conference of the Philippines designated it a national shrine; the solemn declaration rites took place on August 22, 2025, presided by Cardinal Luis Antonio Tagle.

It is the only parish in the Philippines dedicated to the lady and the only sister-parish of the Basilica of Arantzazu in Spain.

== Our Lady of Aranzazu ==
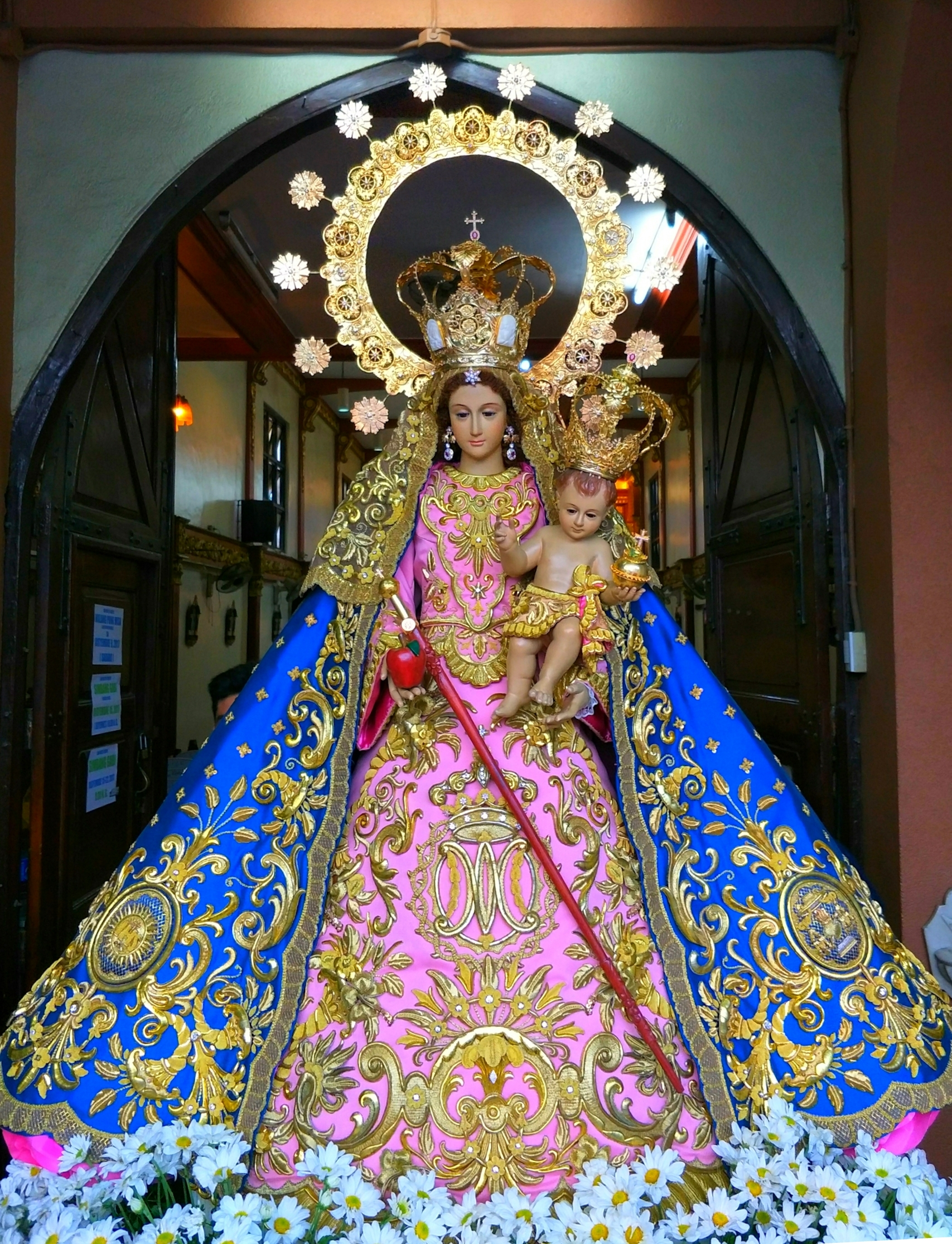
Crowned image of Our Lady of Aranzazu

The image of Our Lady of Aranzazu is the Blessed Virgin Mary's statue, depicted in a standing position with the infant Jesus in her arms. The statue is adorned with a crown and a mantle that flows gently over her shoulders, symbolizing her maternal love and protection. The Virgin Mary gazes downward with a compassionate expression while the Christ Child looks out peacefully.

The image of Our Lady of Aranzazu is traditionally dressed in beautiful robes made of fabrics, often embroidered by her devoted followers. The statue is frequently adorned with flowers, candles, and other offerings as a sign of respect and veneration. Devotees also offer prayers for healing, protection, and guidance, believing in the Virgin's powerful intercession.

The image received an Episcopal Coronation on November 9, 2013, by Bishop Gabriel V. Reyes, with the ceremony officiated by Francisco M. de León. The canonical coronation, granted in response to a petition by the community and parish priest Lawrence C. Paz, was decreed on June 17, 2016, by Cardinal Robert Sarah. The coronation took place on May 31, 2017, with Cardinal Archbishop Orlando Quevedo crowning the image on behalf of Pope Francis and Francisco M. de León as the mass celebrant.

== Features ==
San Mateo Church features a spacious nave with wooden pews, exposed brick walls, and chandeliers. A stunning rose-patterned stained glass window casts colorful light into the interior. The altar, adorned with gold-painted woodwork, houses the image of Our Lady of Aranzazu, surrounded by statues of saints.

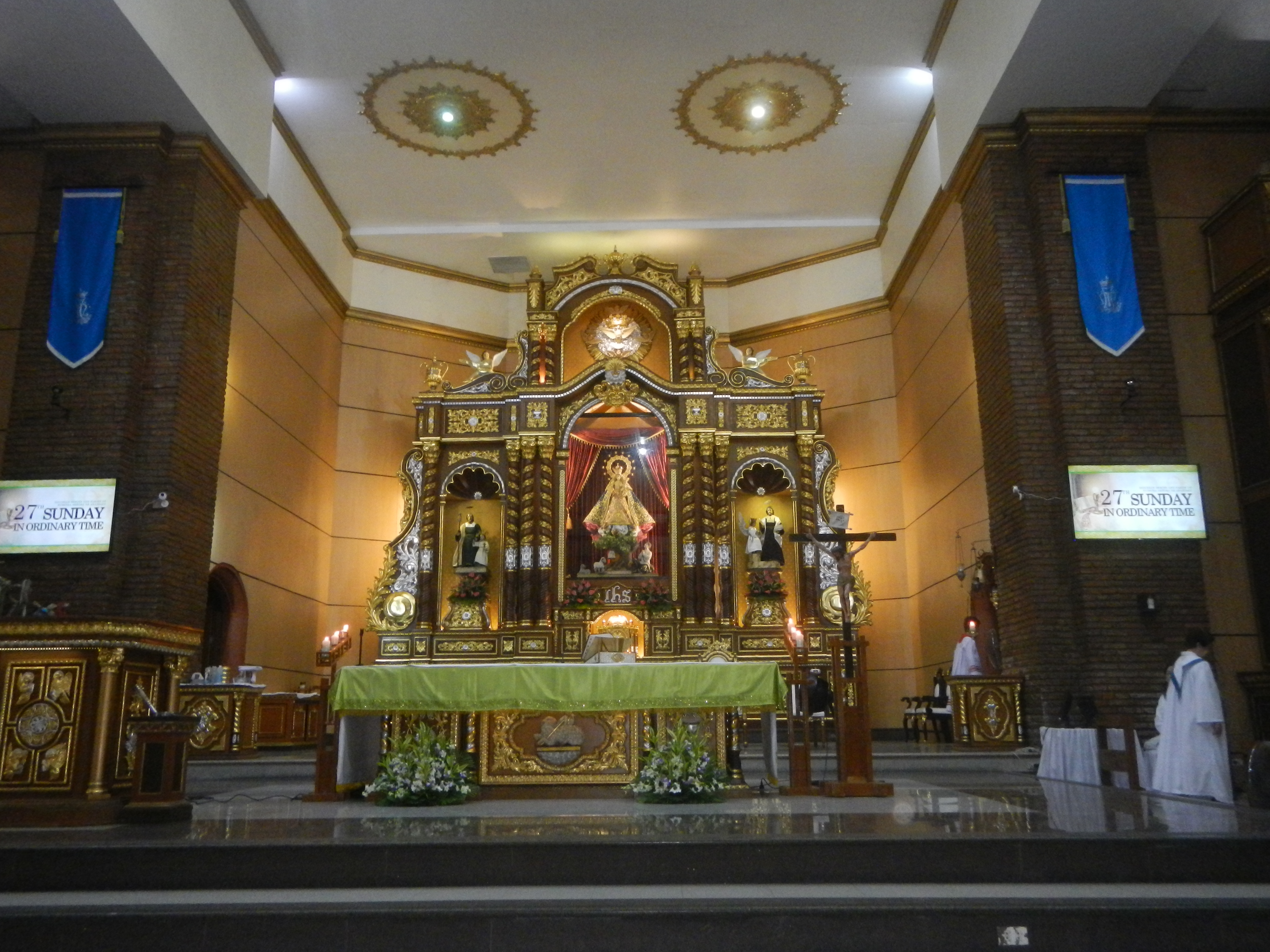
Sanctuary

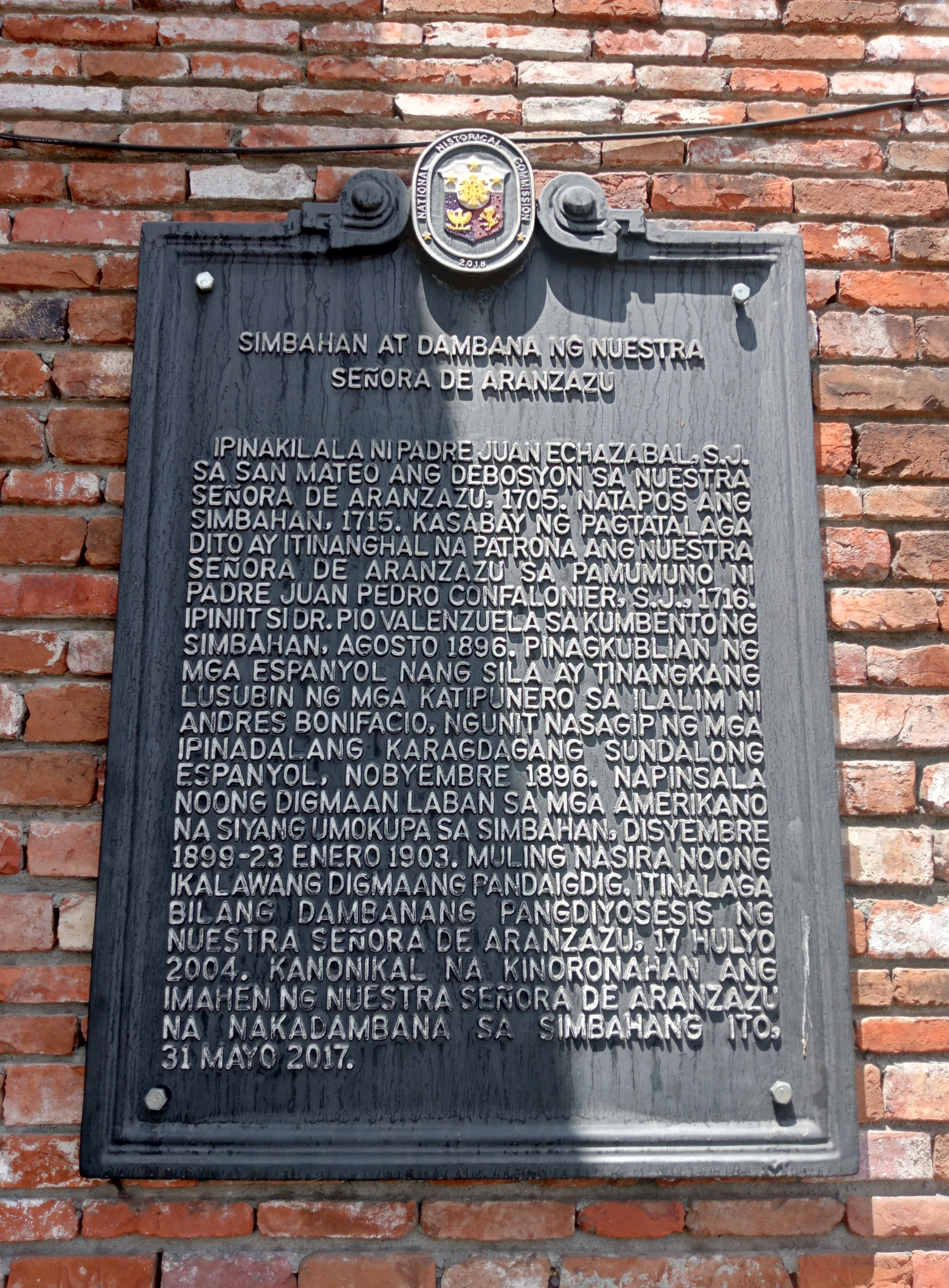
NHCP church marker

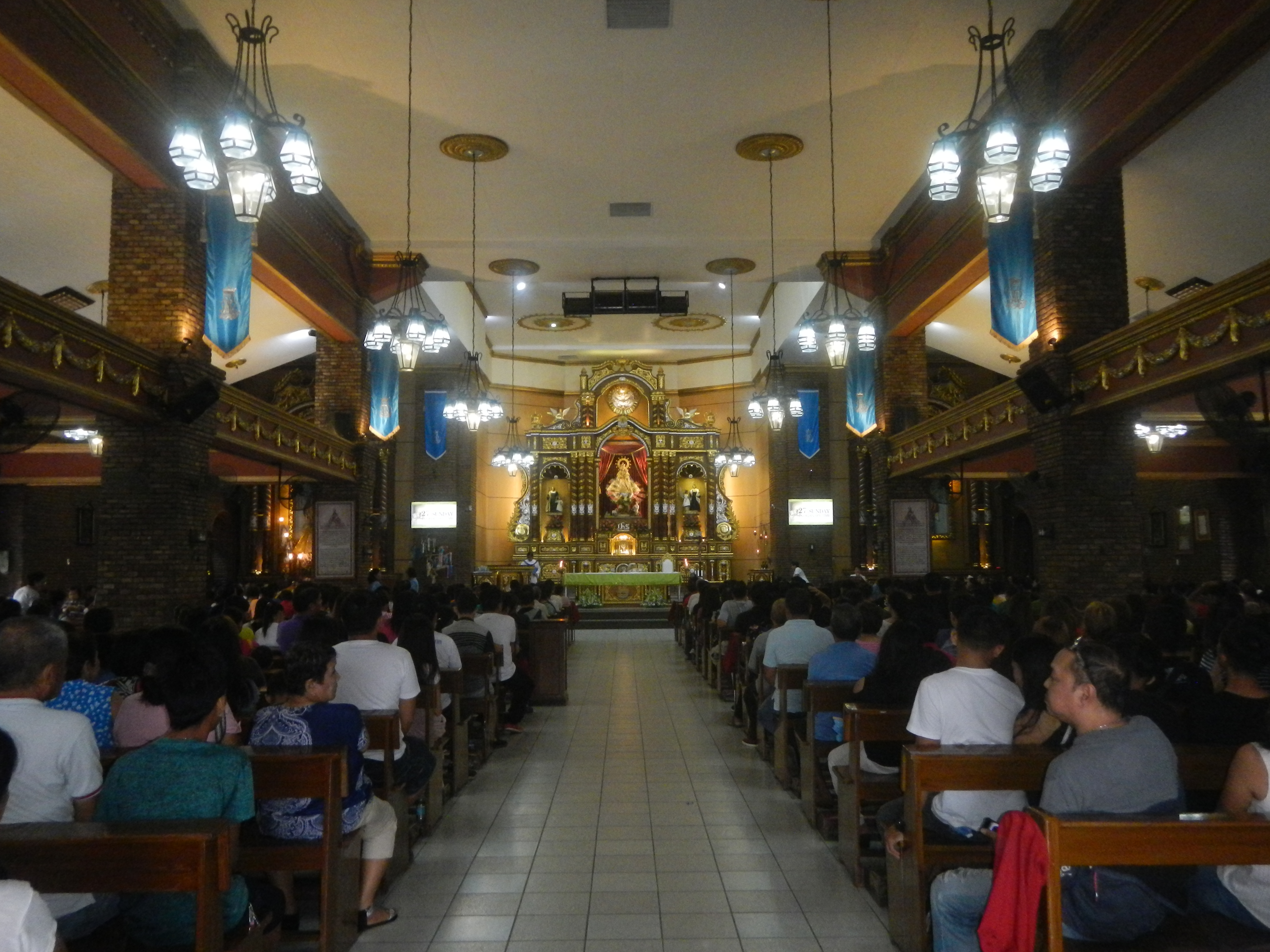
Church nave in 2017

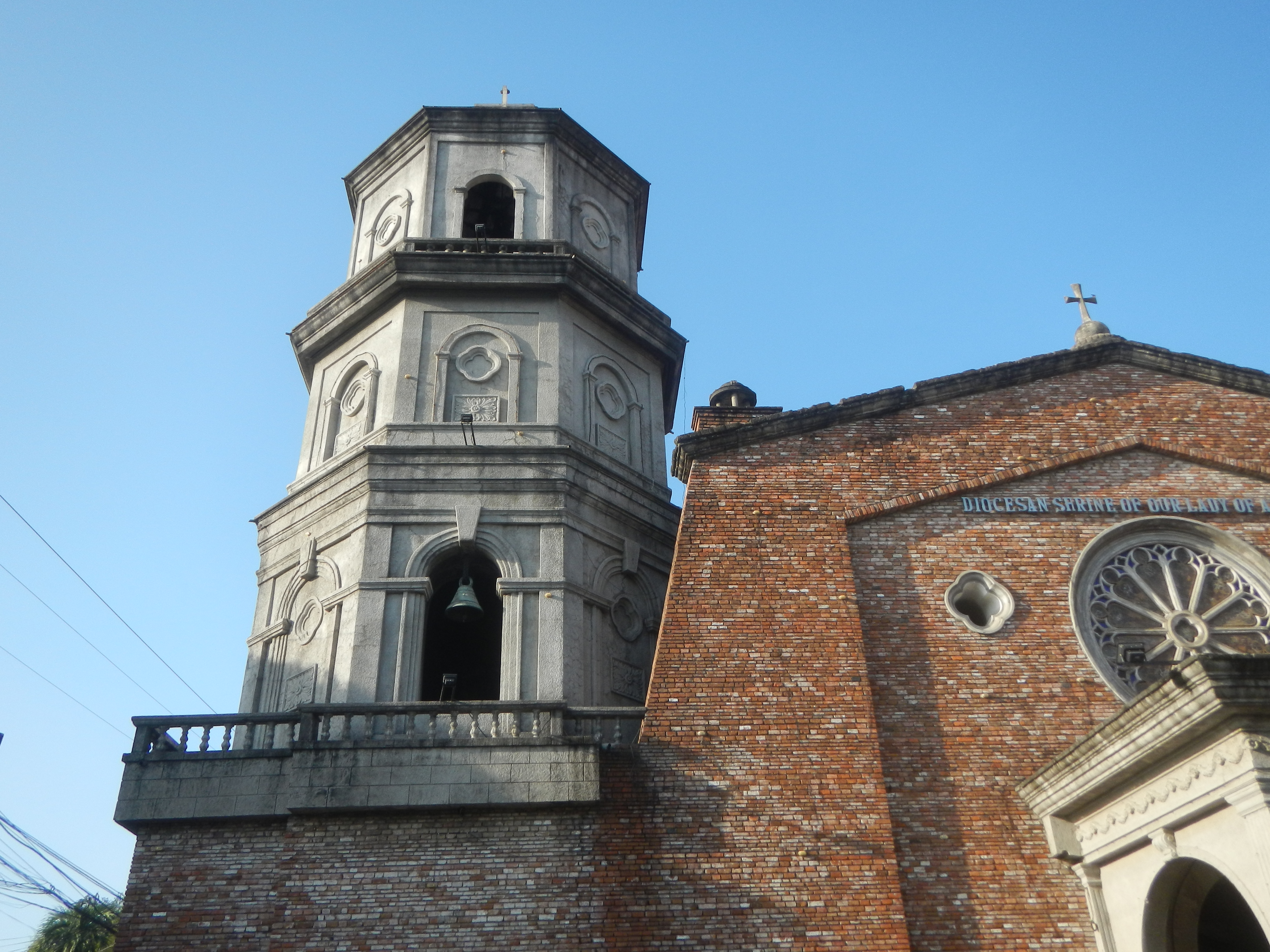
Belfry

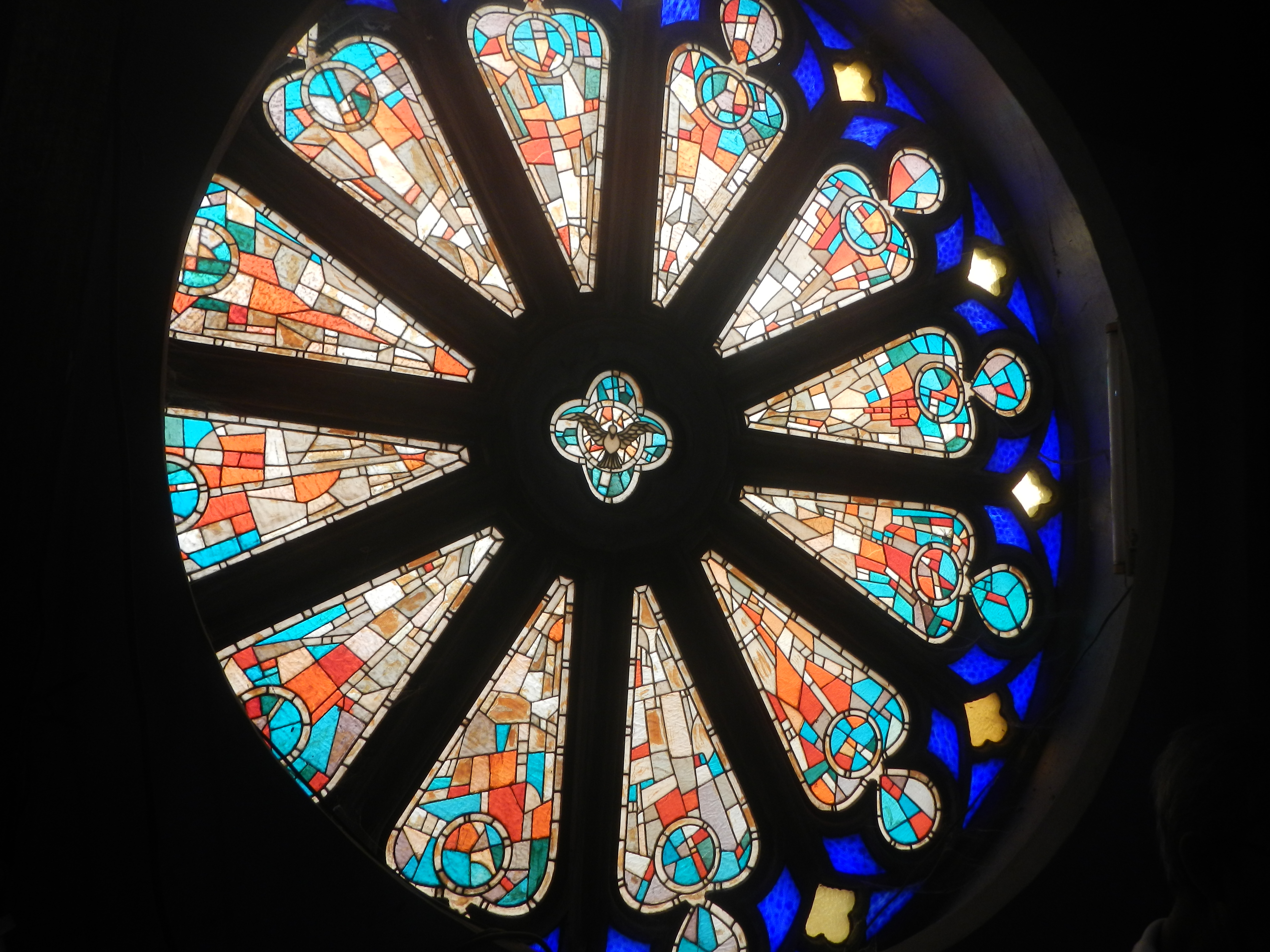
Stained-glass window featuring a dove

== See also ==
- Roman Catholic Diocese of Antipolo
- Our Lady of Aranzazu
- Sanctuary of Arantzazu
