= Sanctuary of Arantzazu =

Sanctuary of Arantzazu Arantzazuko Santutegia
- Sanctuary of Our Lady of Arantzazu
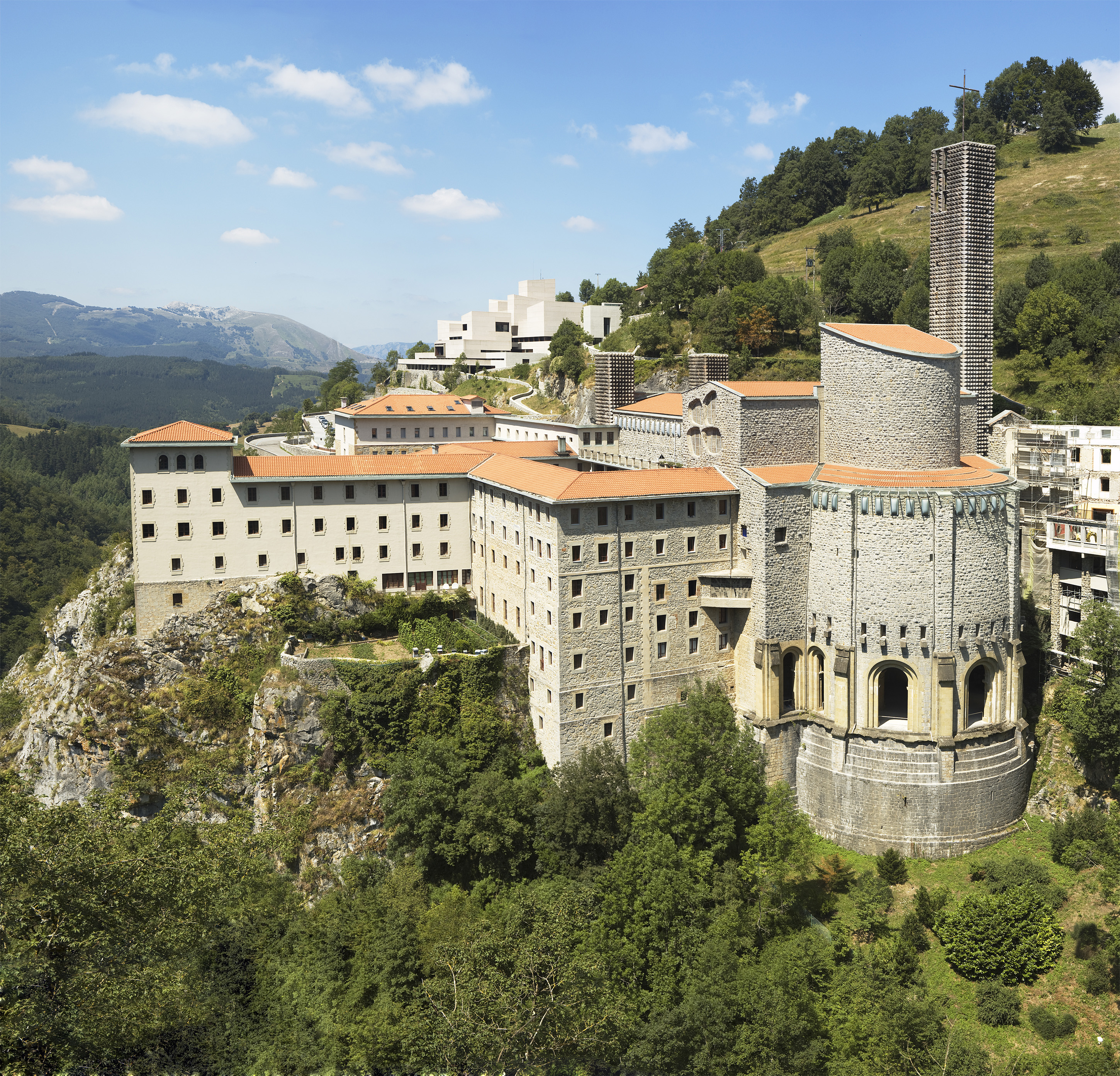
- View of the Sanctuary

- Location in Spain
- 42°58′45″N 2°23′55″W
- Location: Oñati, Gipuzkoa
- Country: Spain
- Denomination: Roman Catholic
- Website: www.arantzazu.org/index.php/es//

History
- Dedication: Virgin of Arantzazu

Architecture
- Completed: 1950s

Administration
- Diocese: Diocese of Donostia-San Sebastián

The Sanctuary of Our Lady of Arantzazu [aˈɾants̻as̻u] is a Franciscan church located in Oñati, Basque Country, Spain. The church is a much-loved place among Gipuzkoans, as the Virgin of Arantzazu is the shrine’s namesake and patron saint of the province, alongside Ignatius of Loyola.

It is built on the site where the Virgin of Arantzazu reportedly appeared to the shepherd Rodrigo de Balanzategui in 1468. Legend has it the figure of the Virgin was in a thorn-bush, and the boy exclaimed "Arantzan zu?!" (Thou, among the thorns?!), giving rise to the name of the place. A linguistic explanation is the name stems from arantza + zu meaning “place abounding in hawthorn”. Pope Leo XIII granted a Canonical coronation to the image on 6 June 1886.

Arantzazu is a female name in Spain in the forms Arantza and Arantzazu (especially in Biscay and Gipuzkoa), along with Arancha (Spanish spelling) or Arantxa (Basque spelling), in line with Spanish phonetics.

The place benefits from the highland silence and peaceful atmosphere of the Aizkorri mountain range along with good road infrastructure, so it is frequently visited by pilgrims and tourists. It is also a starting point for well-signalled mountains trails and circuits for hikers that provide access to the meadows of Urbia and on to the Aizkorri, the massif Aloña and the lands south and east of the shrine.

A replica with the same title was brought to the Philippines in 1705 during the Spanish colonial era, and is unique for showing the Virgin standing. On 31 May 2017, Pope Francis granted a Canonical coronation to the Philippine image, venerated at the National Shrine and Parish of Our Lady of Aránzazu in San Mateo, Rizal.

== Etymology ==
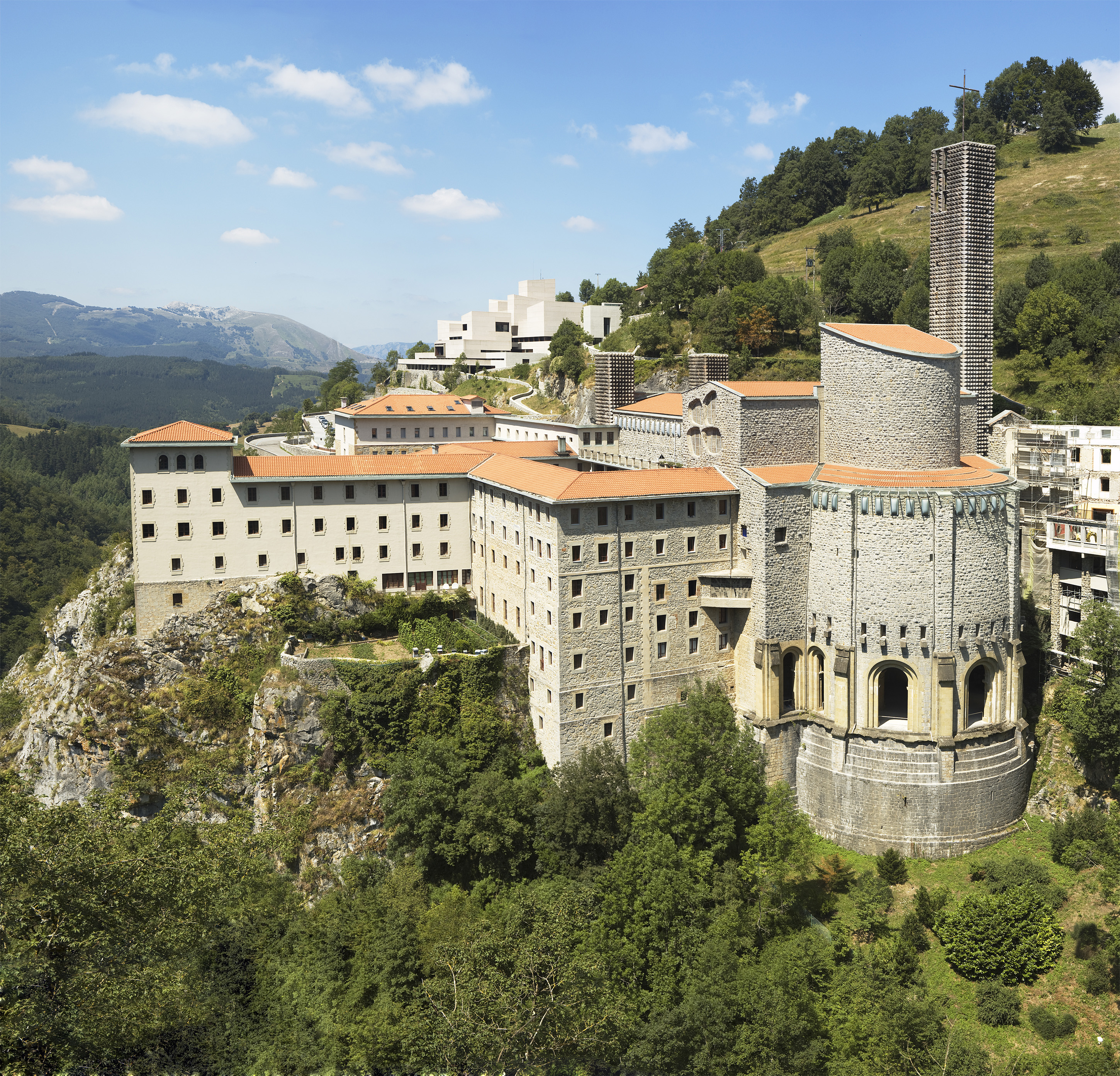
View of the Sanctuary of Arantzazu

The name of the sanctuary, the place, and the Virgin are all related to the legend of her appearance. The word arantzazu itself is Basque, made up of "arantza" which means "thorn" and the suffix "zu" indicating "abundance", making the translation "abundance of thorns", making reference to the abundant thorny bushes that grow in the area.

Esteban de Garibay, in his Compendio historial de las Chrónicas y universal historia de todos los Reynos d'España (1571), states that the Virgin appeared to a young girl named María de Datuxtegui. In the same book, however, he gives another version, which is better known. Garibay says that he heard this story from the mouth of a witness who knew a shepherd named Rodrigo de Balanzategui. This man had said he found a small image of the Virgin with a child in her arms, hidden in a thorny bush, next to a cowbell. Upon seeing it, he exclaimed, Arantzan zu?!, meaning "In the thorns, you?!".

This legend again appears in the first history of the sanctuary written by Franciscan Gaspar de Gamarra, twenty years later in 1648:

Llámasse Aránzazu en buen lenguaje cántabro-bascongado y como la ethimología de haverse hallado esta santa imagen en un espino, que en esta lengua se llama Aranza y se le añade la dicción zu, y es a mi ver lo que sucedió en el misterioso hallazgo de esta soberana margarita que, lleno de admiraciones el pastor, viendo una imagen tan hermosa y resplandeciente de María Santíssima que hacía trono de un espino, la dijo con afectos del corazón: Arantzan zu?, que es como si dixera en lengua castellana: Vos, Señora, siendo Reyna de los Angeles, Madre de Dios, abogada de pecadores, refugio de afligidos, y a quien se deven tantas veneraciones y adoraciones, cuando merecíais estar como estáis en los cielos en throno de Seraphines, mucho más costoso y vistoso que el que hizo Salomón para su descanso. Vos, Señora, en un espino?

(It is called Aránzazu in good Cantabrian-Basque language and its etymology comes from that holy image in a thorn bush, which in this language is called Aranza to which the word zu is added, and it is my understanding that what happened in the mysterious finding of this sovereign daisy who, when the shepherd was full of admiration watching such a beautiful and shiny image of the Most Holy Mary on a throne in a thorn bush, told her with affection in his heart: Arantzan zu?, which is as if he were saying in Spanish: You, My Lady, being the Queen of the Angels, Mother of God, advocate for the sinners, refuge for the distraught, to whom so much veneration and adoration is owed, when you deserve to be as you are in heaven, on a throne of Seraphim, much more costly and attractive than the one Solomon made for his rest. You, My Lady, in a thorn bush?)

Historian Padre Lizarralde, who created the sanctuary's coat of arms, based its design on the legend, and drew a thorn bush, out of which a star blooms, and with its light it scares away the dragon, sending it into the abyss. The legend reads “Arantzan zu”.

== The basilica ==
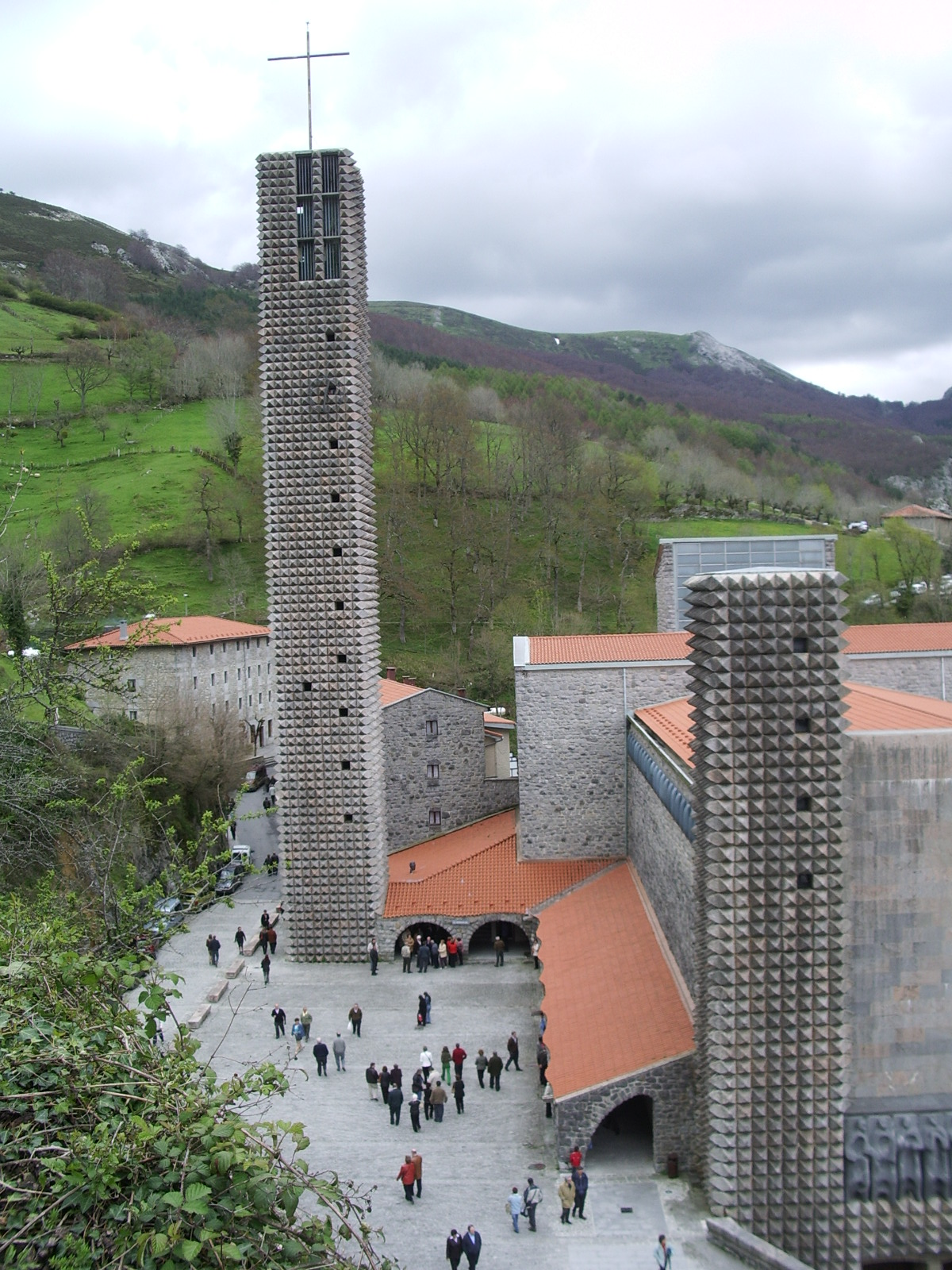
View of the sanctuary.

In 1950, work on the new basilica started, and the building was inaugurated five years later. Francisco Javier Sáenz de Oiza and Luis Laorga were the leading architects, and other artists also took part in the work:

- Lucio Muñoz, the altarpiece
- Jorge Oteiza, the sculptures of the Apostles
- Eduardo Chillida, the entrance gates
- Nestor Basterretxea, the paintings of the crypt
- Xabier Álvarez de Eulate, the stained-glass windows
- Eduardo Chillida, doors

The Franciscan convent has been a center for Basque culture, even under Franco's repression.

The main festivity in Arantzazu is the Virgin’s feast day on September 9.

== Gallery ==
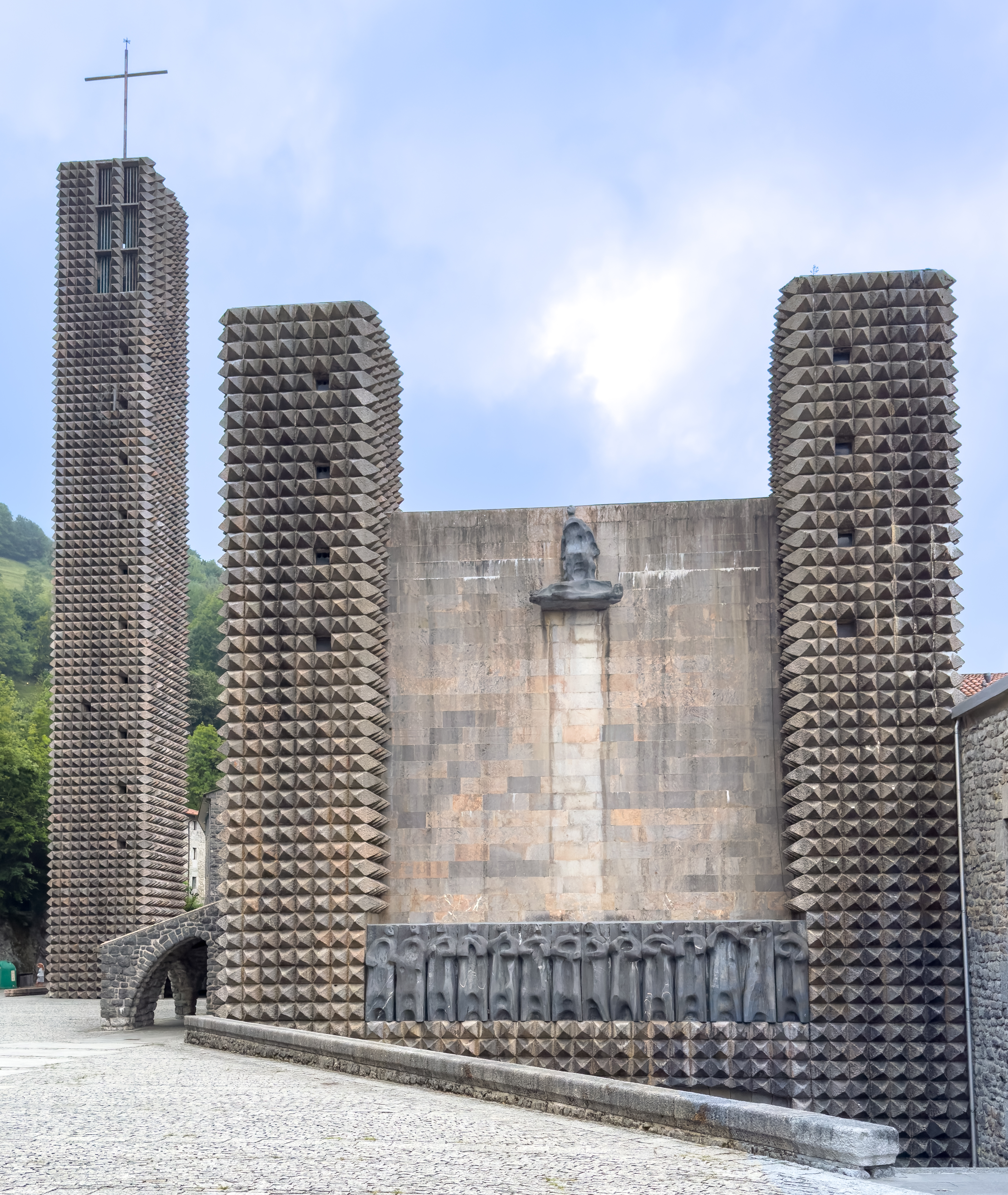

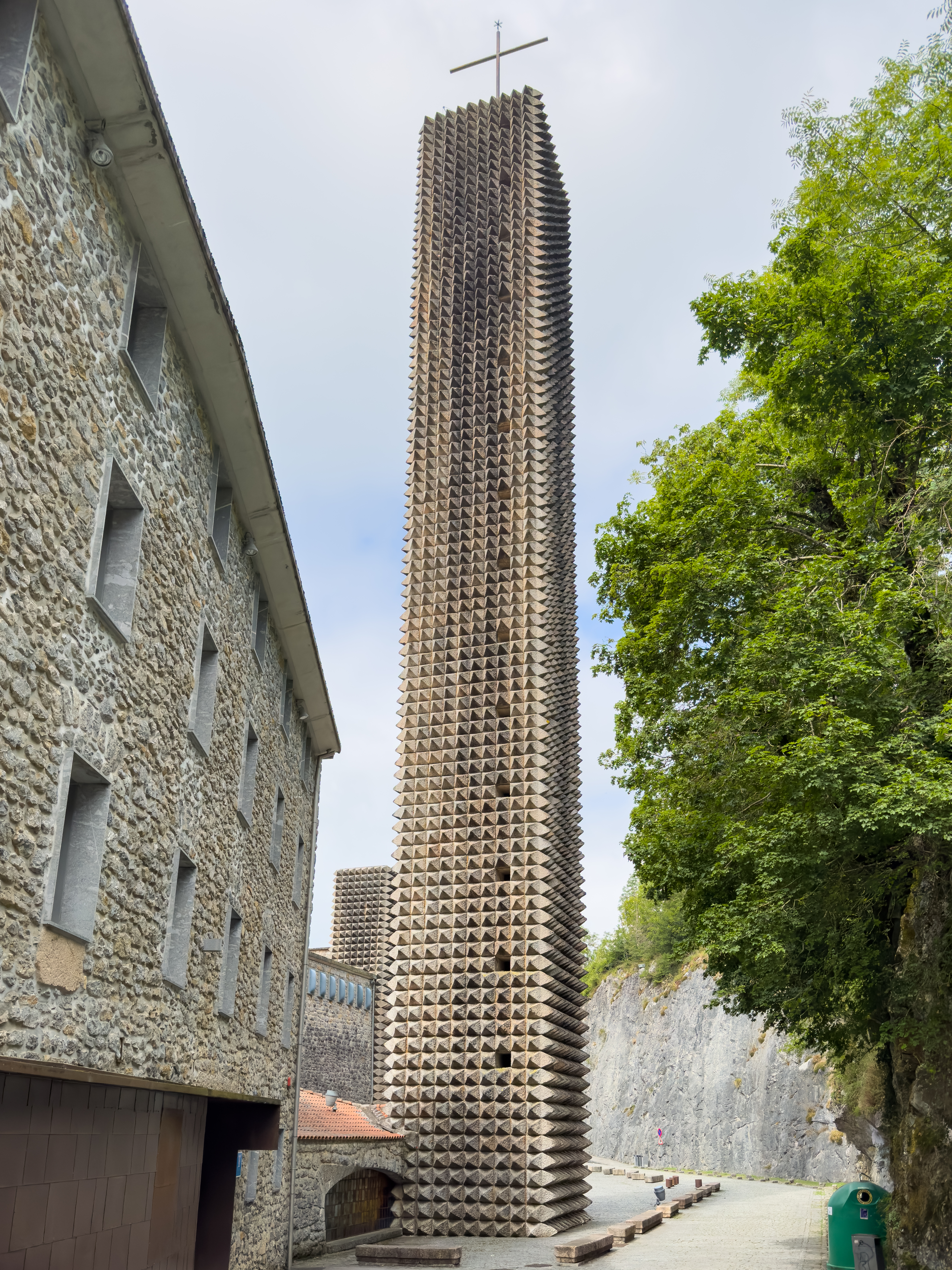

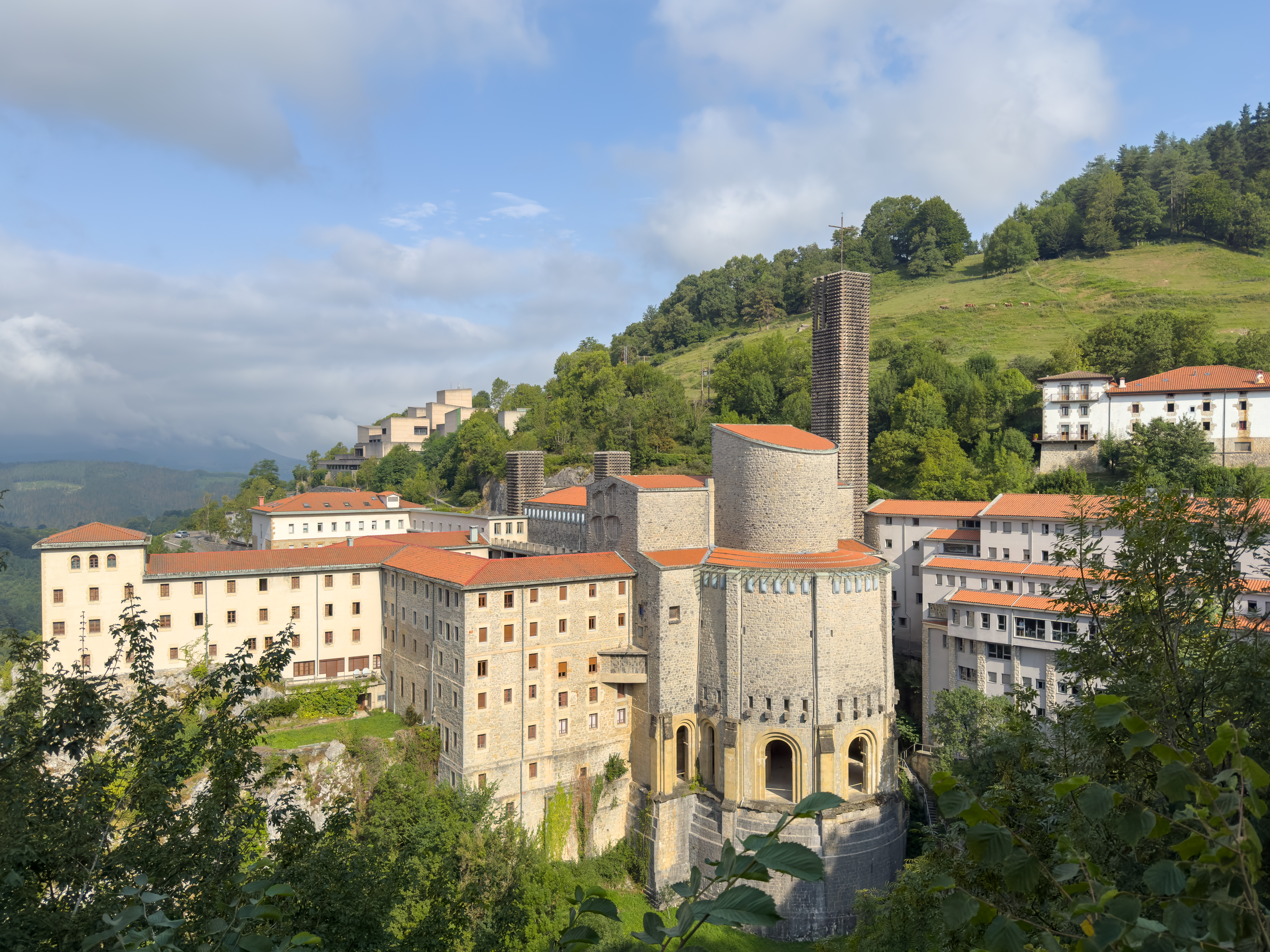

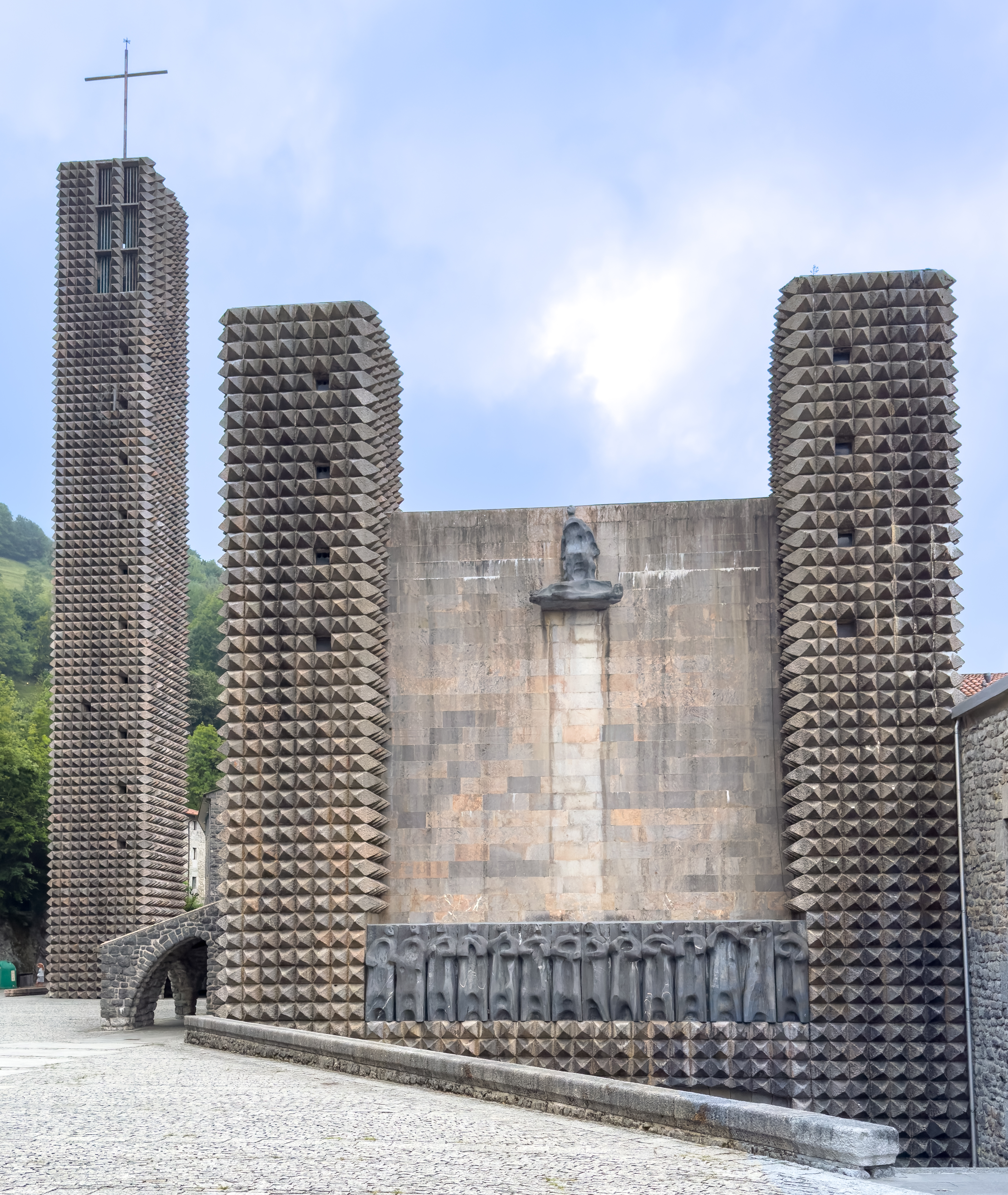

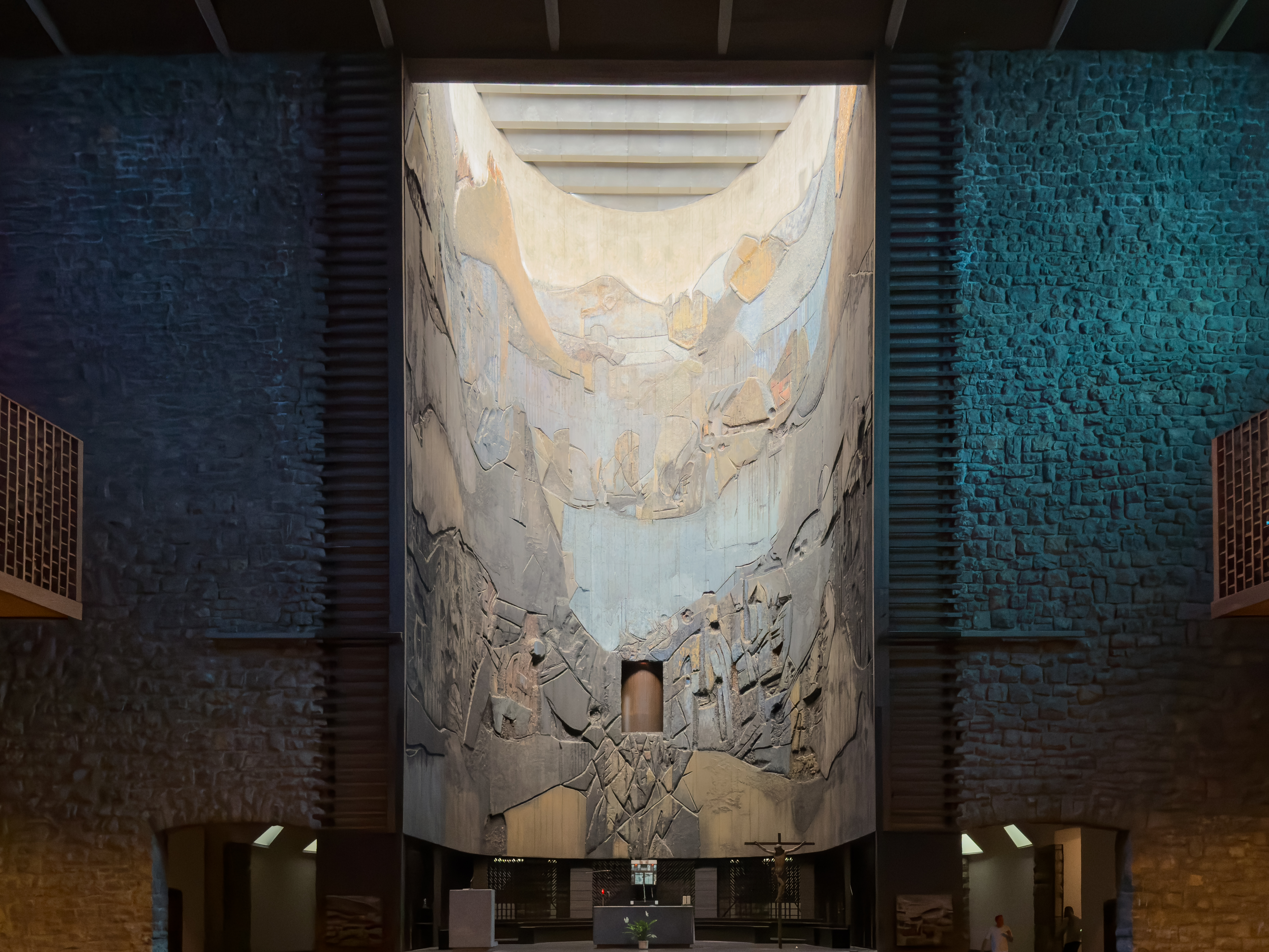

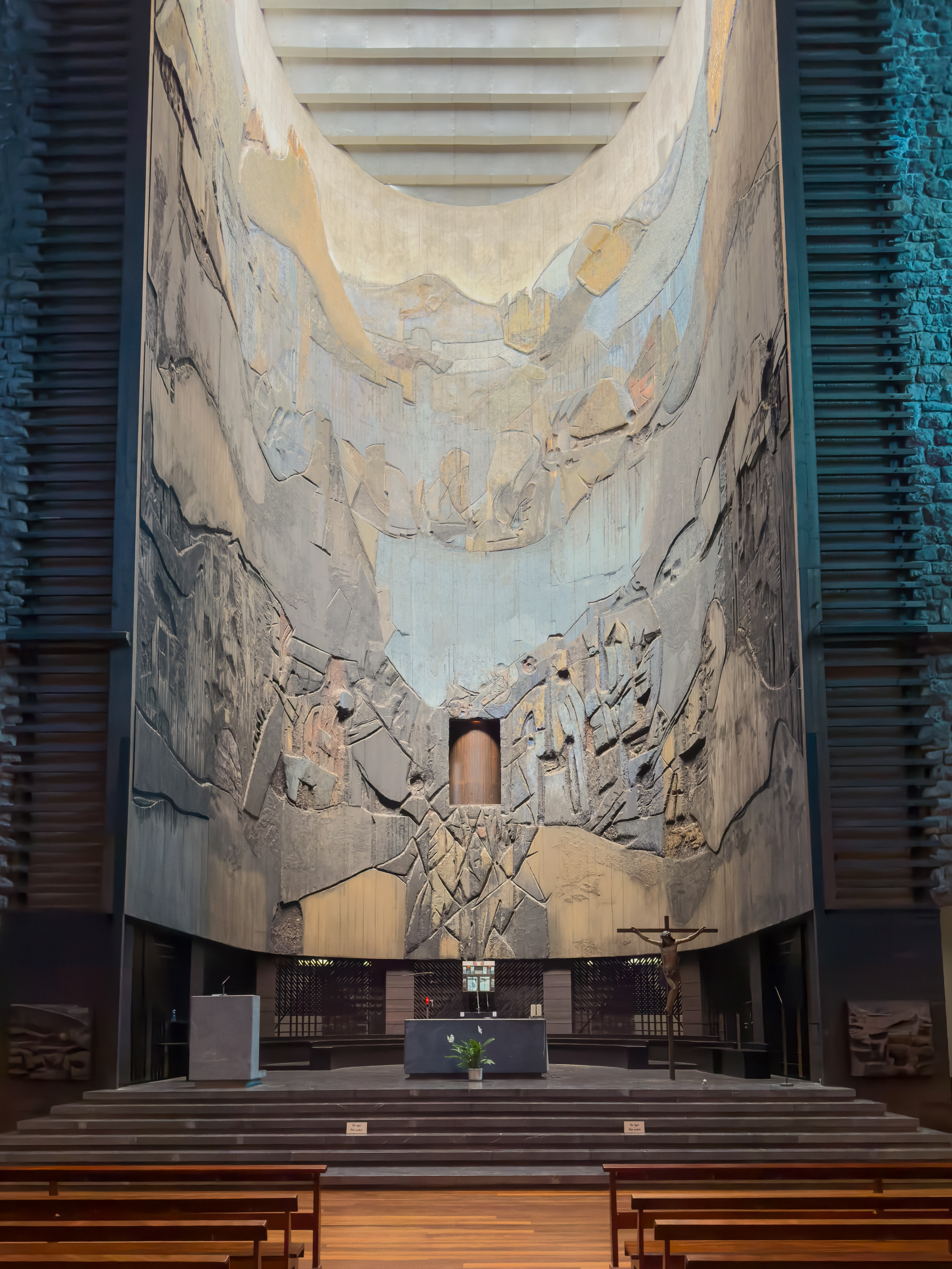

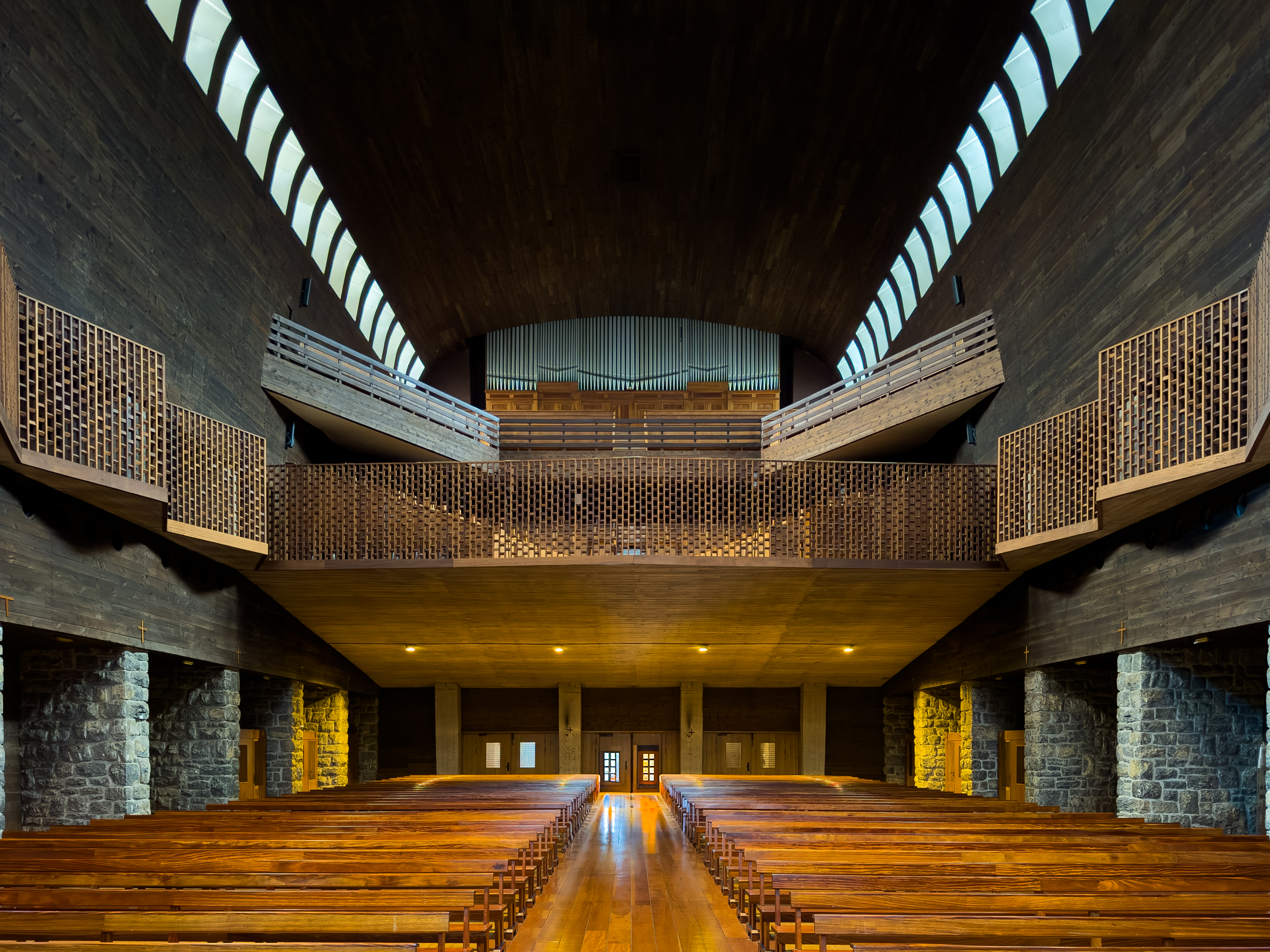

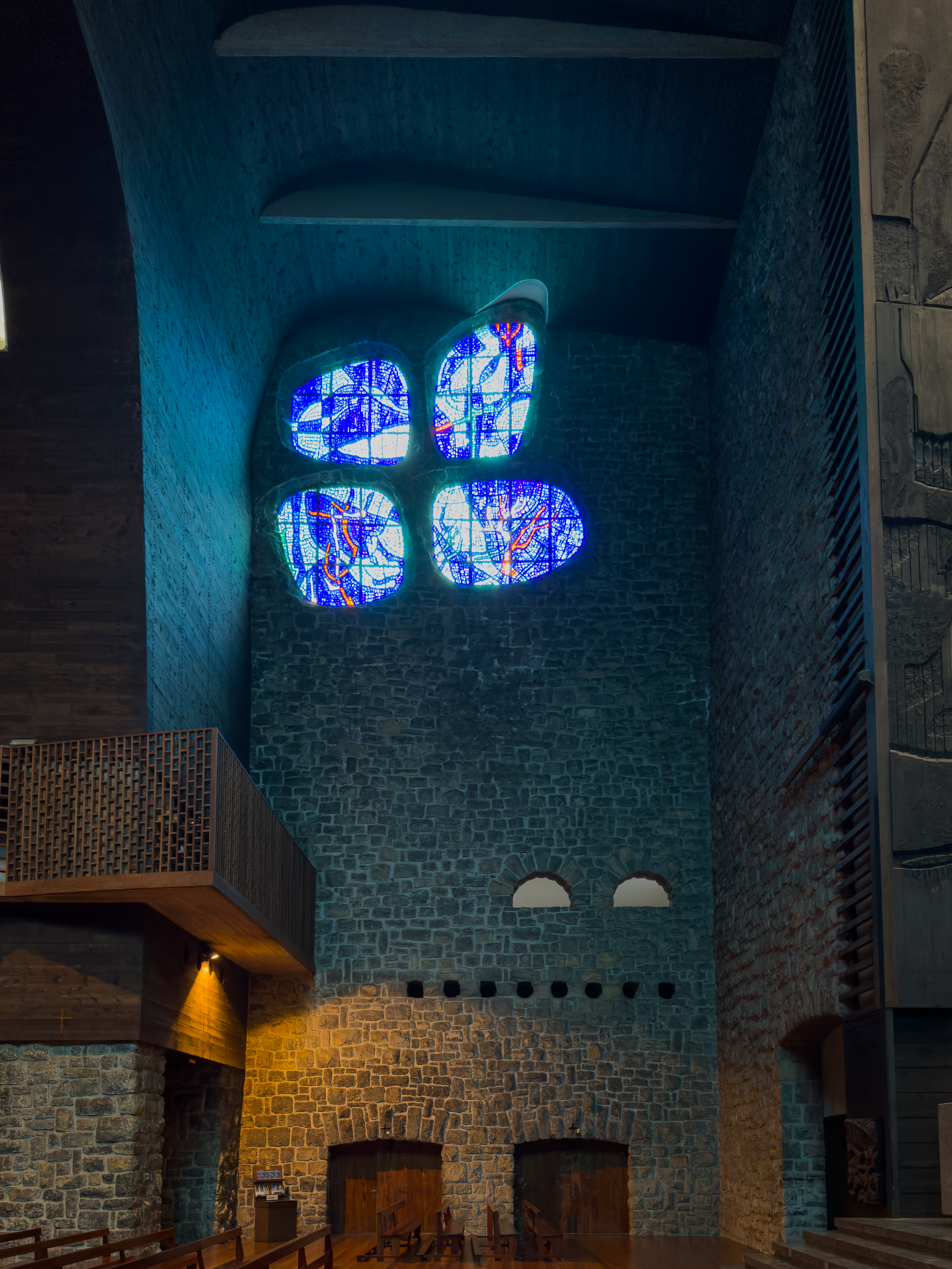
