= Our Lady of Aranzazu =

Patroness of San Mateo, Rizal

Our Lady of Aranzazu Nuestra Señora de Aránzazu
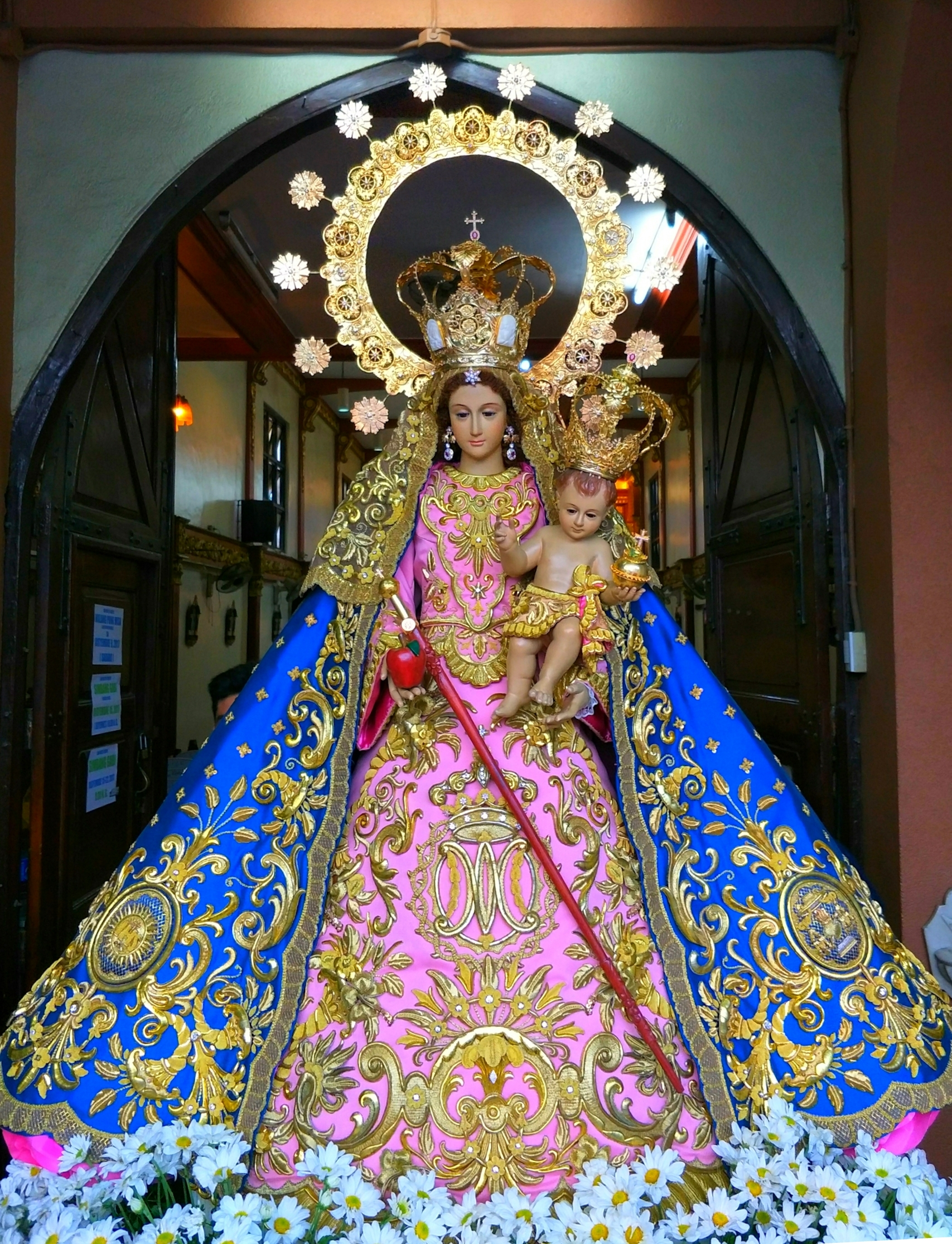
- The canonically crowned image of Nuestra Señora de Aránzazu currently vested and enshrined
- Location: San Mateo, Rizal, Philippines
- Date: June 11, 1469
- Witness: Rodrigo de Balzategui
- Type: Marian devotion from Oñate, Spain
- Approval: Pope Francis
- Venerated in: Catholic Church
- Shrine: National Shrine and Parish of Nuestra Señora de Aránzazu
- Patronage: Against natural disaster and calamities Northern Rizal (San Mateo & Rodriguez)
- Feast day: September 9

Our Lady of Aránzazu (Spanish: Nuestra Señora de Aránzazu; Filipino: Birhen ng Bayan ng San Mateo) is a Catholic title of the Blessed Virgin Mary.

The replica in the Philippines is known as a wonderworking image due to claims of healing and delivery from flood. It retains its standing posture despite controversy owing to the original image in Oñati, Spain, being seated.

== History ==
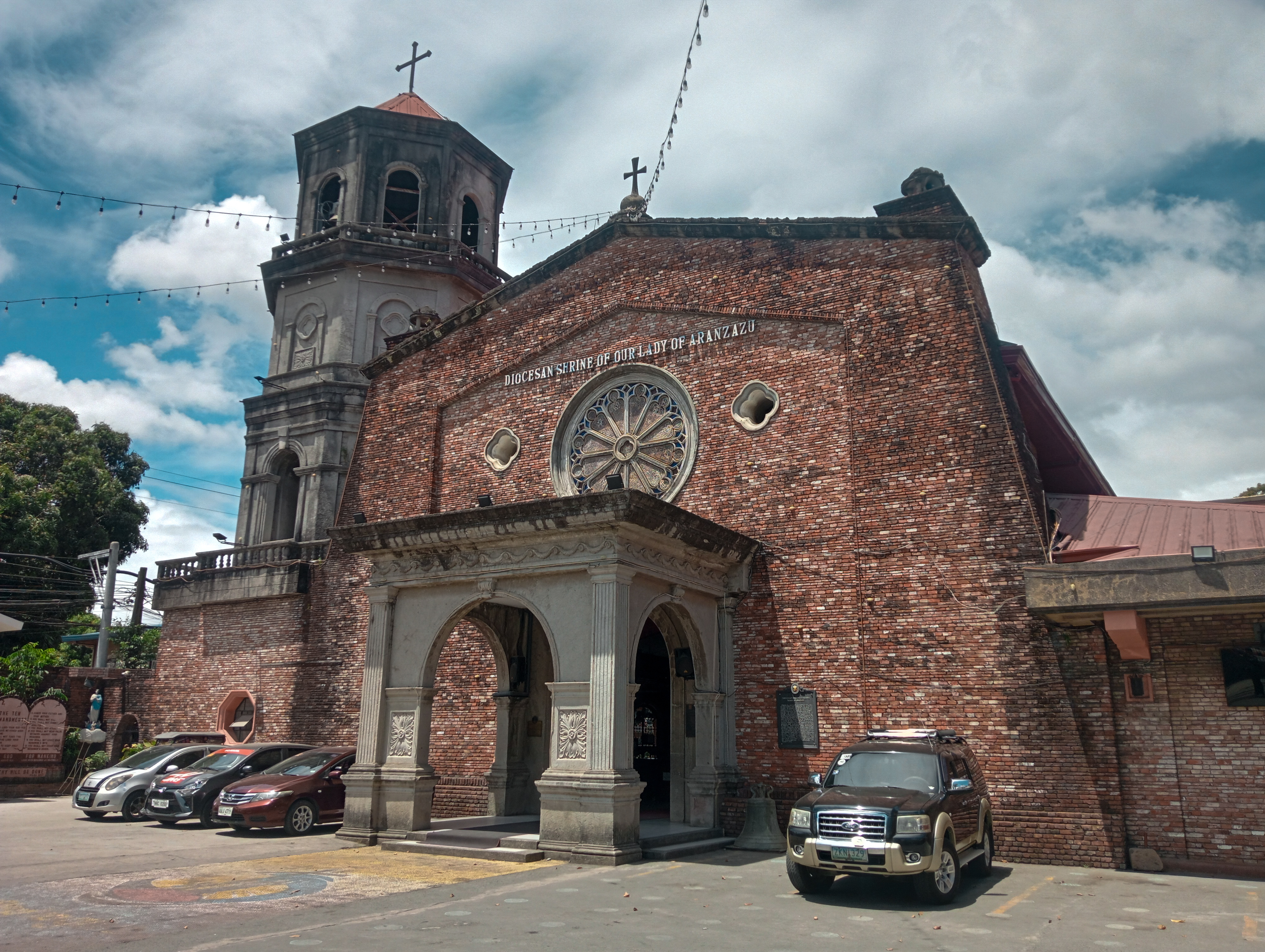
The church where the current image is enshrined.

The history of Christianity in San Mateo, Rizal dates back to the early Spanish era of 1596, when the Augustinians built the first settlements in the area. On August 29, 1596, the first parish church was built under the patronage of Saint Matthew the Apostle.

On December 6, 1696, the Jesuits arrived and gained control of the church and town. In 1705, the Jesuit Juan de Echazabal changed the patronage of the town from Saint Matthew to the Virgin of Aránzazu, which he introduced.

In 1716, a new church was built on the site of the present one and placed under the patronage of the Virgin. The first image of the Virgin was brought to the Philippines by a Spanish captain from the Basque Country. In 1732, the Dominican Colegio de San Juan de Letrán in Intramuros also made efforts in spreading the devotion to the Virgin of Aránzazu.

== Description ==
Mary, holding the Christ Child, is vested in imperial regalia, and holds an apple symbolising her role as the "New Eve" (La Nueva Eva). The image depicts the 1469 apparition, with the Virgin standing on a thorn bush with a small, squarish bell hanging from it. It includes a statuette of Rodrigo de Balzategui kneeling before the Virgin.

The image faced controversy as the Virgin is shown standing while the original image in the Sanctuary of Arantzazu in Oñate, is a seated Madonna. A seated replica was made in 1990, with the controversy officially settled by the Diocese of Antipolo in 2012. Bishop-Emeritus Gabriel Reyes ruled the enshrined image will retain its standing posture, as per local custom and the wishes of devotees.

== Veneration ==
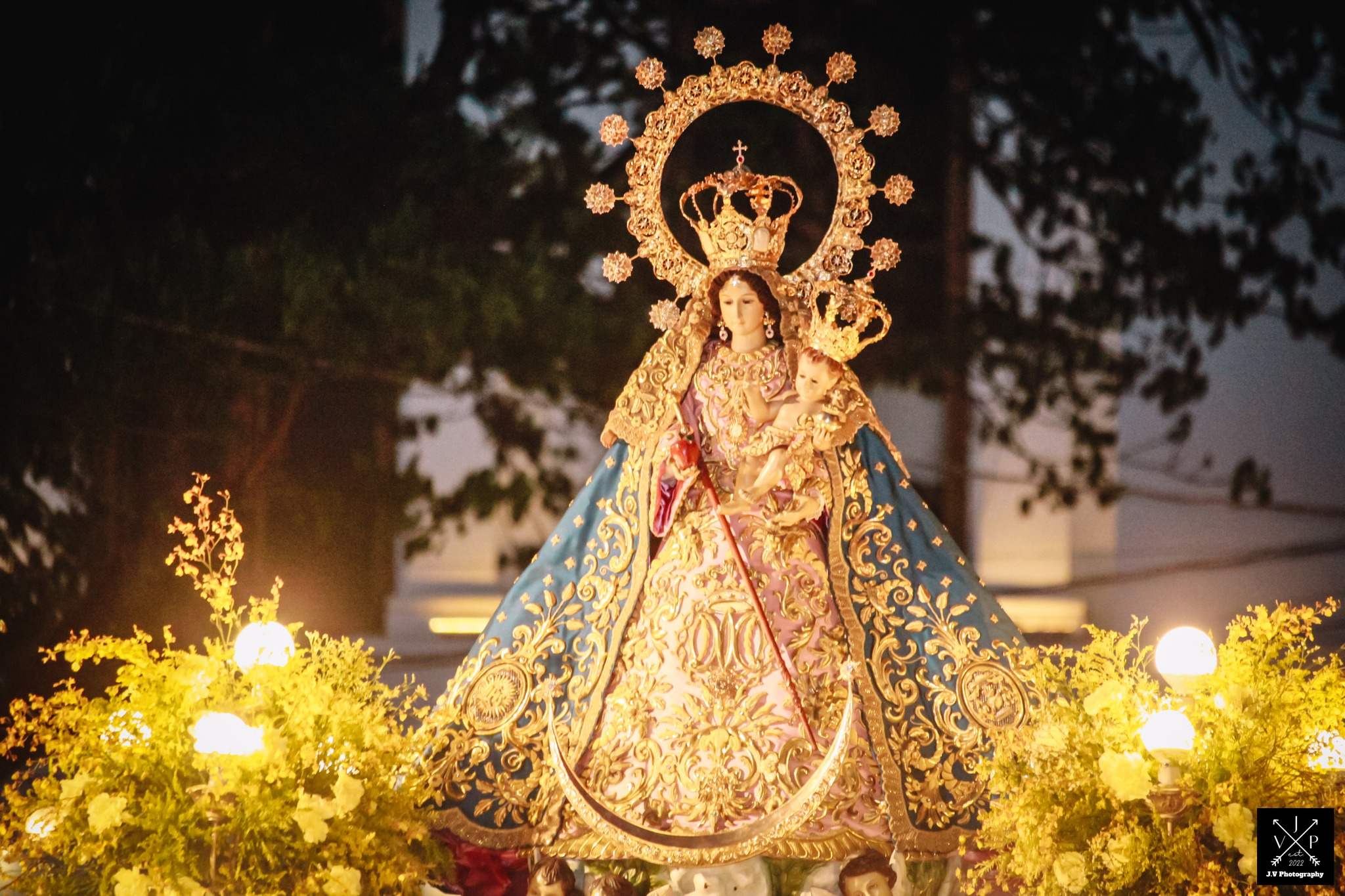
The original image during the 42nd Intramuros Grand Marian Procession. It is also one of the famed image during the IGMP.

The image was granted an episcopal coronation on November 9, 2013, by the Bishop of Antipolo, Gabriel V. Reyes, the coronation ceremony was officiated by Francisco M. de León.

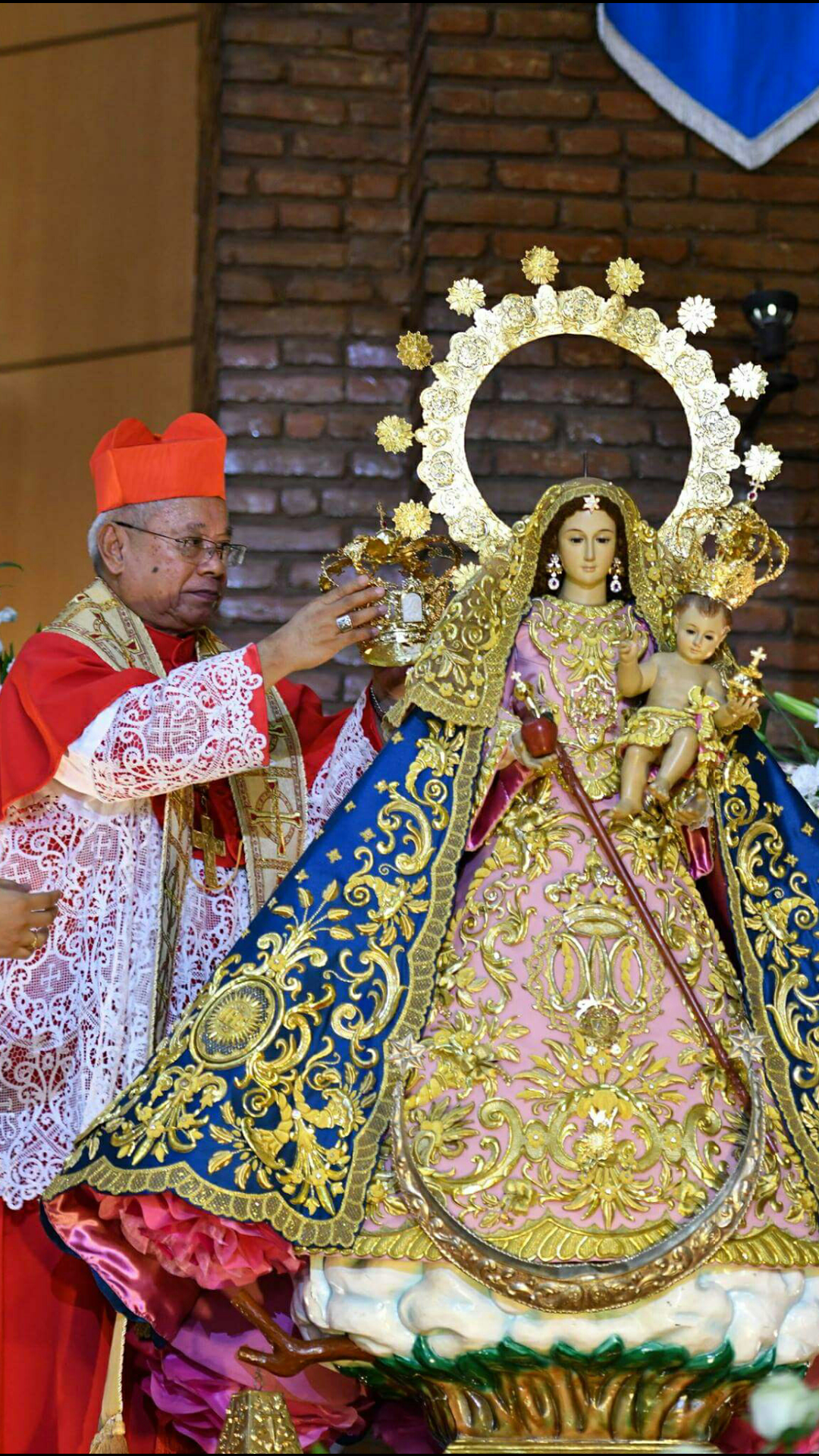
The image being crowned by Cardinal Quevedo, representing Pope Francis

The canonical coronation of the image was granted by Pope Francis in response to a petition by the parish through its late curate Lawrence C. Paz, with documents prepared by the Cofradía de Nuestra Señora de Aránzazu. The decree was promulgated on June 17, 2016, by Cardinal Robert Sarah, then-Prefect of the Congregation for Divine Worship and the Discipline of the Sacraments (now the Dicastery for Divine Worship and the Discipline of the Sacraments). The coronation was held on May 31, 2017, with Francisco M. de León celebrating the Mass, and Cardinal Orlando Quevedo performing the crowning.

== Devotion ==
The feast day of the image is celebrated every September 9 with much solemnity and joy as people carry her image in procession while waving white handkerchiefs and singing her devotional hymn. The feast day was traditionally on every Sunday or the Sunday nearest Pentecost until it was discovered by former parish priest Rev. Fr. Marcelino Prudente that the Virgin’s feast in Oñate is on September 9. Through his efforts, Protacio Gungon, then-Bishop of Antipolo, decreed in 1989 that the feast of the Virgin is to be kept on its present date.

The shrine devotes the ninth day and second Saturday of each month to the Virgin. The devotion to Nuestra Señora de Aránzazu continues to inspire the people of San Mateo to strive for their faith. Miracles continued to be reported through her intercession up to the present and devotees from around the country make a pilgrimage to her shrine in seeking her intercession.

== Miracles ==
Thousand of devotees offer testimonials of miracles through the intercession of the Virgin of Aránzazu. One of the most popular is when during one typhoon season, San Mateo was in danger of flooding so it was decided to process the Virgin through every area of the town. It is said that once the Virgin faced each household or area, the floods suddenly subsided. Another case was in 2013 when Typhoon Yolanda (international name: Haiyan) was projected to hit Rizal province around the time of the episcopal coronation. Heavy downpours loomed yet when the Virgin arrived, the rains ceased and the coronation Mass proceeded.

Other miracles reported by devotees to the shrine can be seen in the chapel of the Virgin, and these range from cures from diseases like cancer, passing licensure examinations for various professions, financial aid, reconciliation of families, and the conversions of nonbelievers.

== Gallery ==
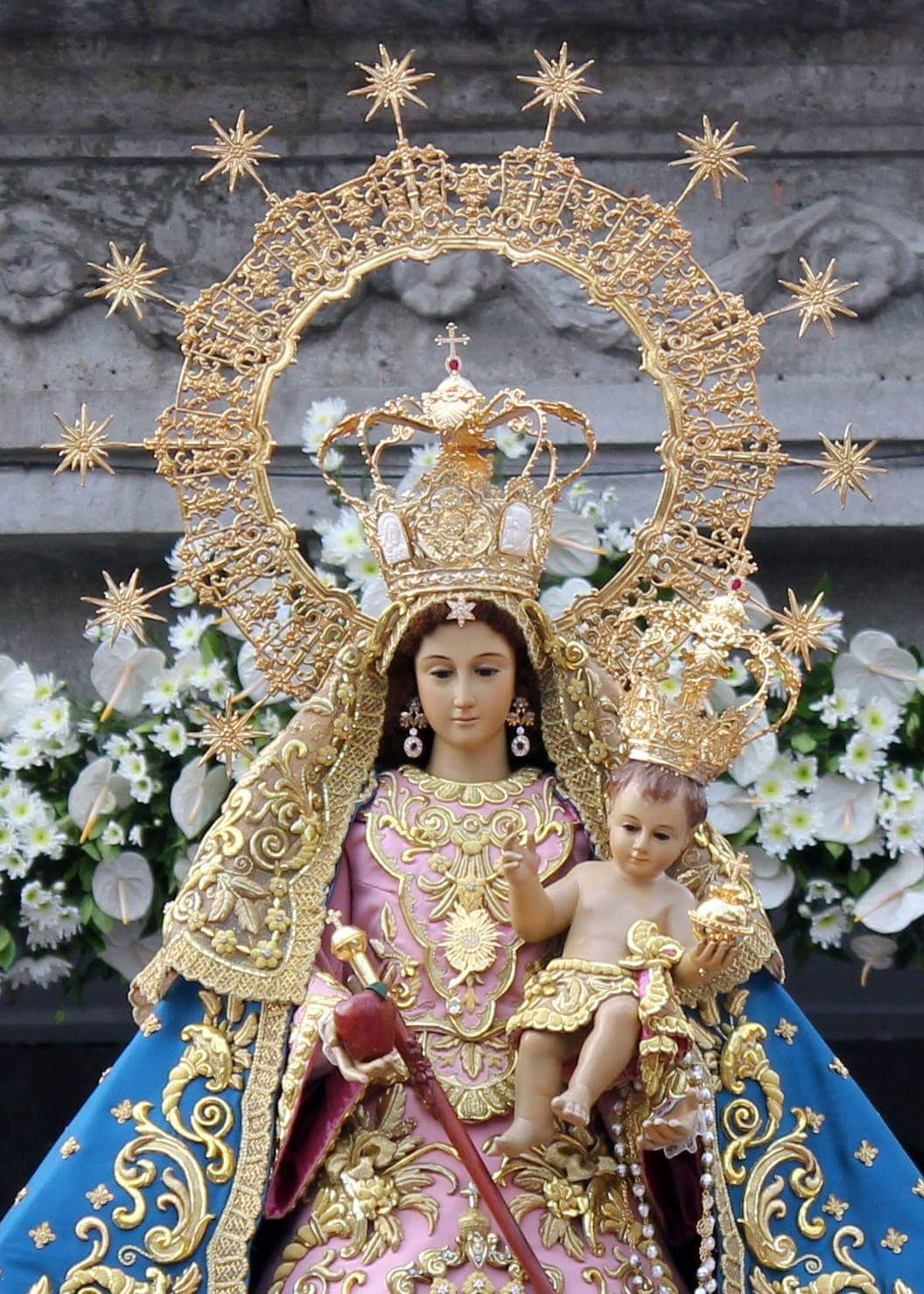
The Canonically Crowned Image of Our Lady of Aránzazu is brought out from the shrine for a procession.

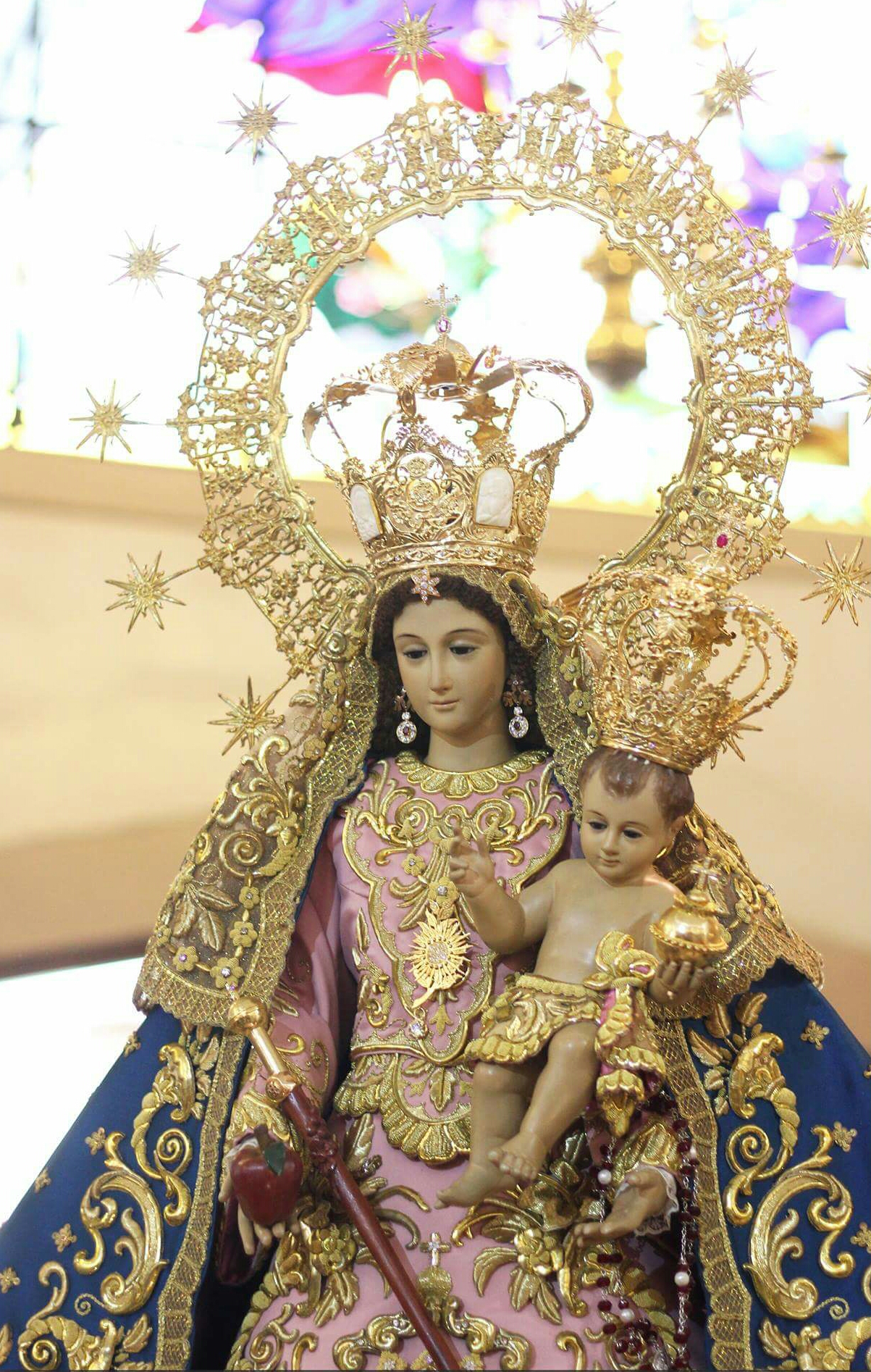
The Canonically Crowned Image of Our Lady of Aránzazu

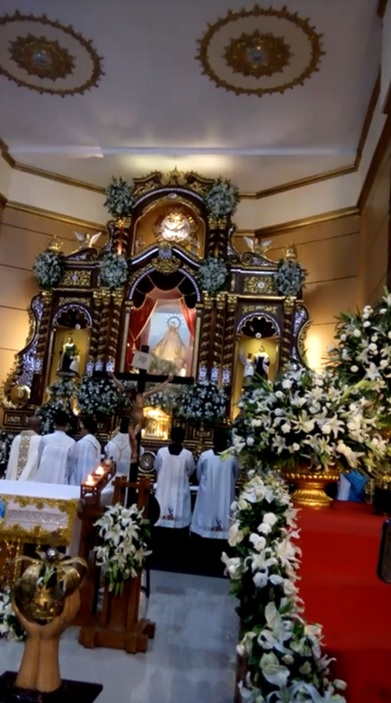
Our Lady of Aránzazu being enthroned on her retablo at the high altar of the church

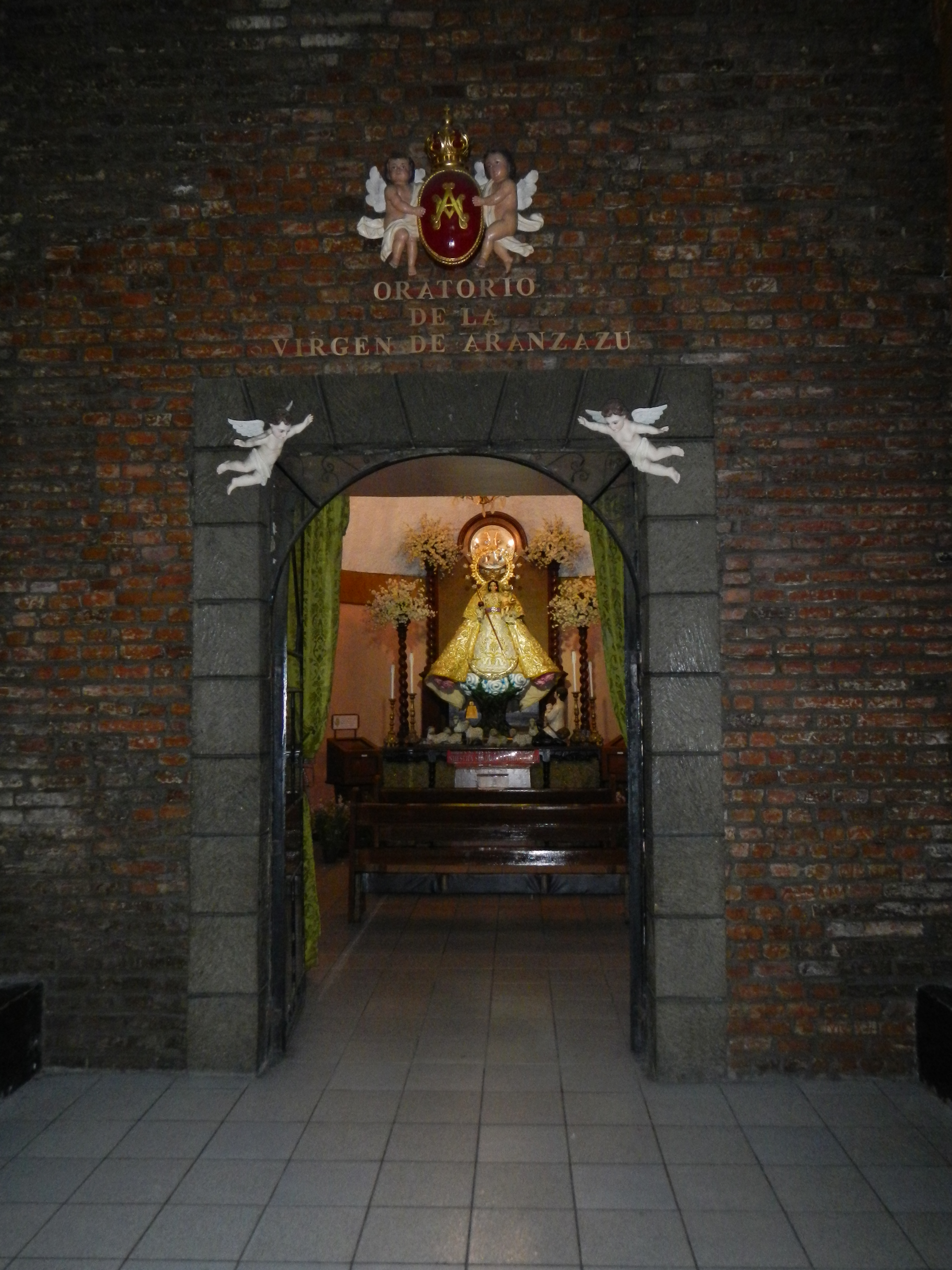
The shrine oratory, which holds a copy of the image.

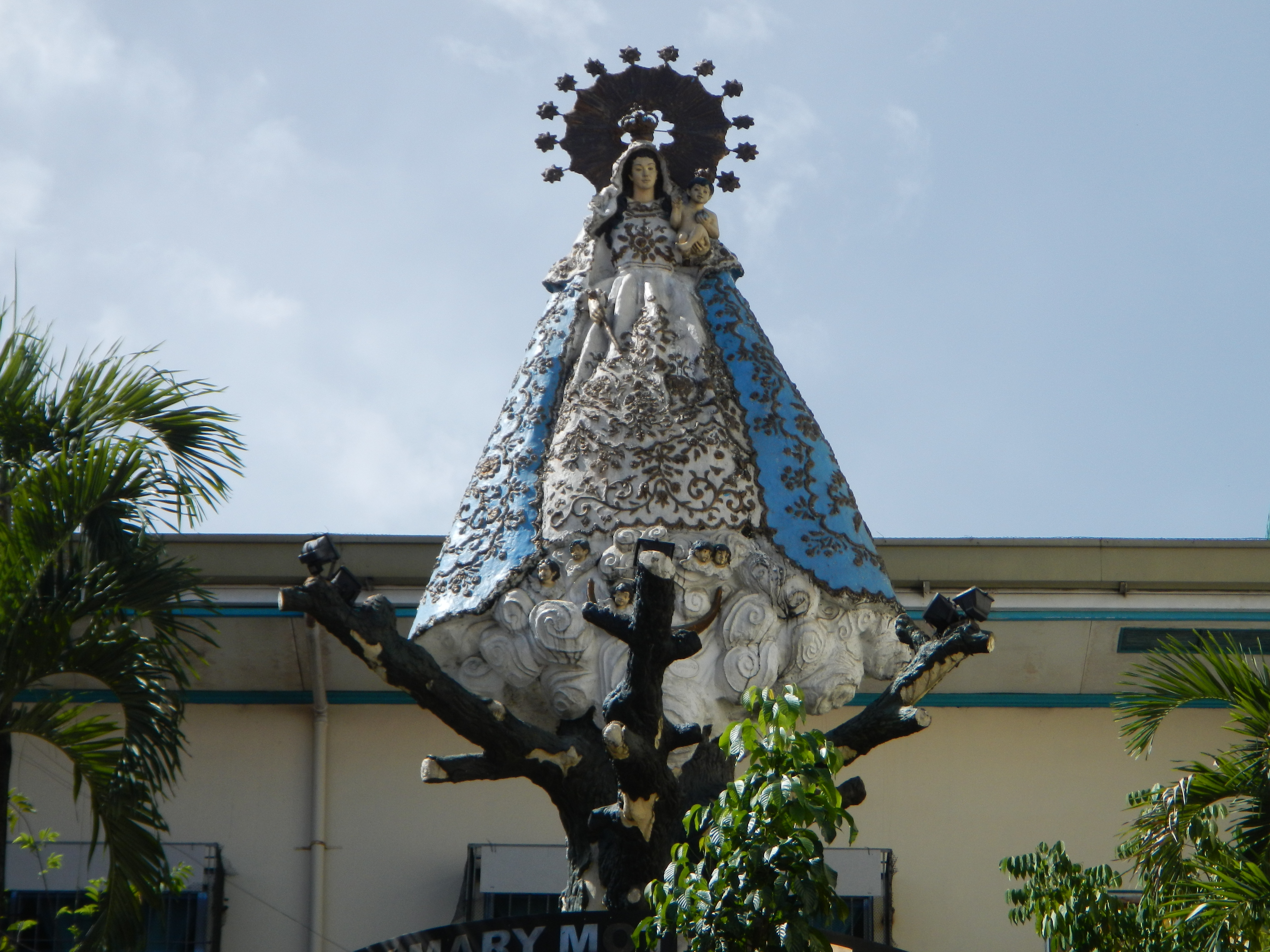
A large outdoor copy of the image on the shrine grounds

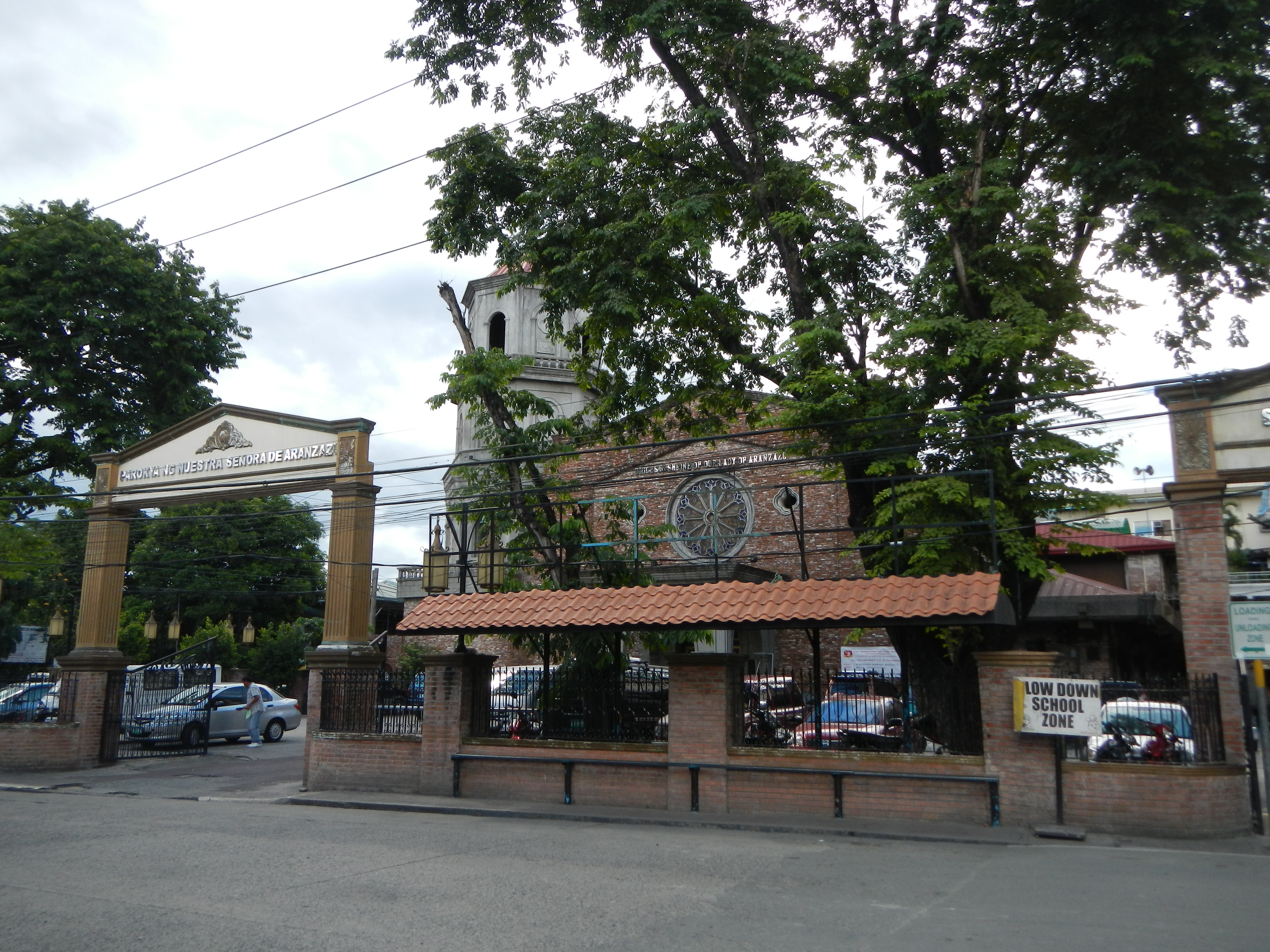
The view of the church façade behind the trees

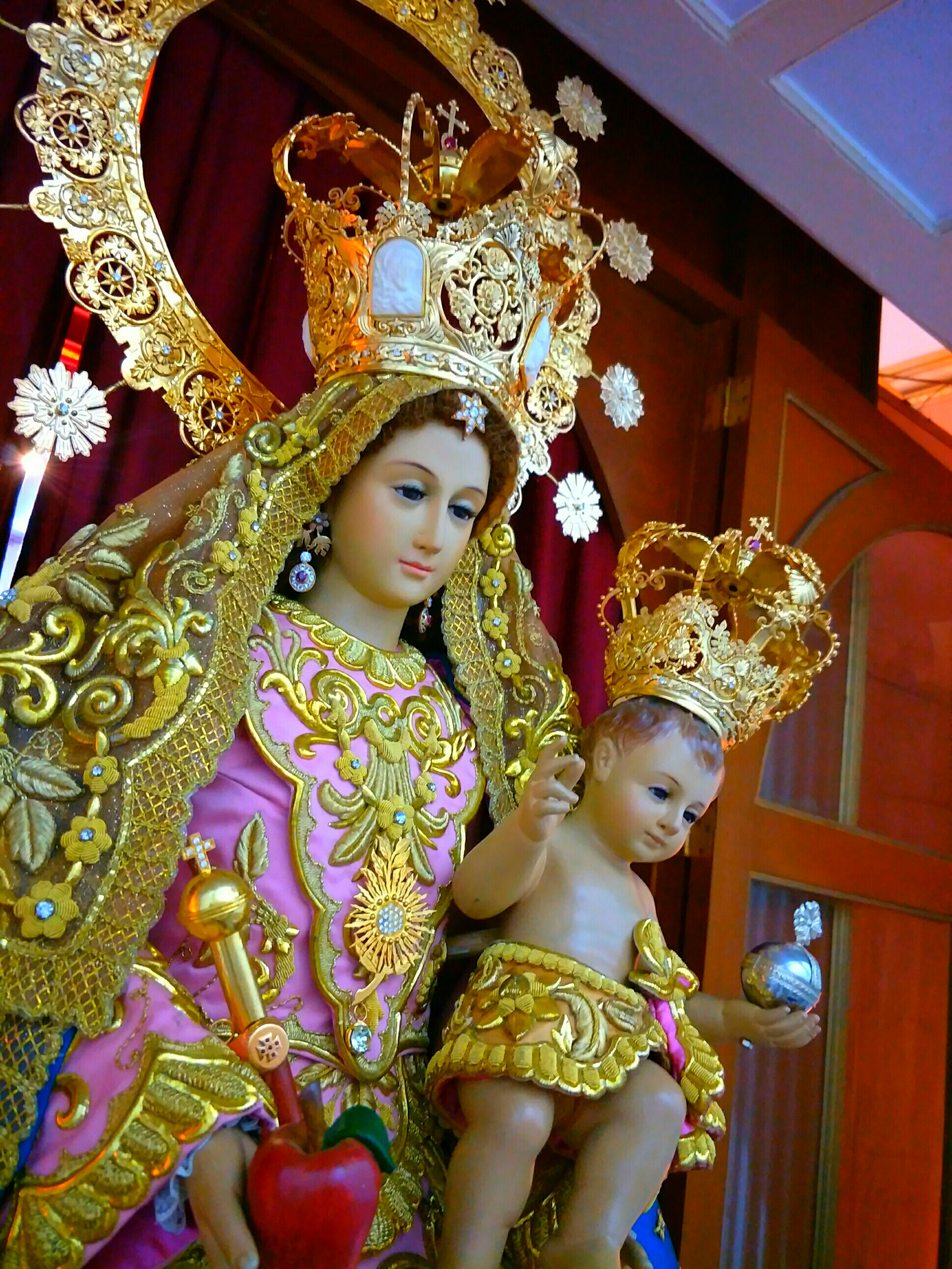
Closeup of the image and its crowns, shortly before the enthronement.

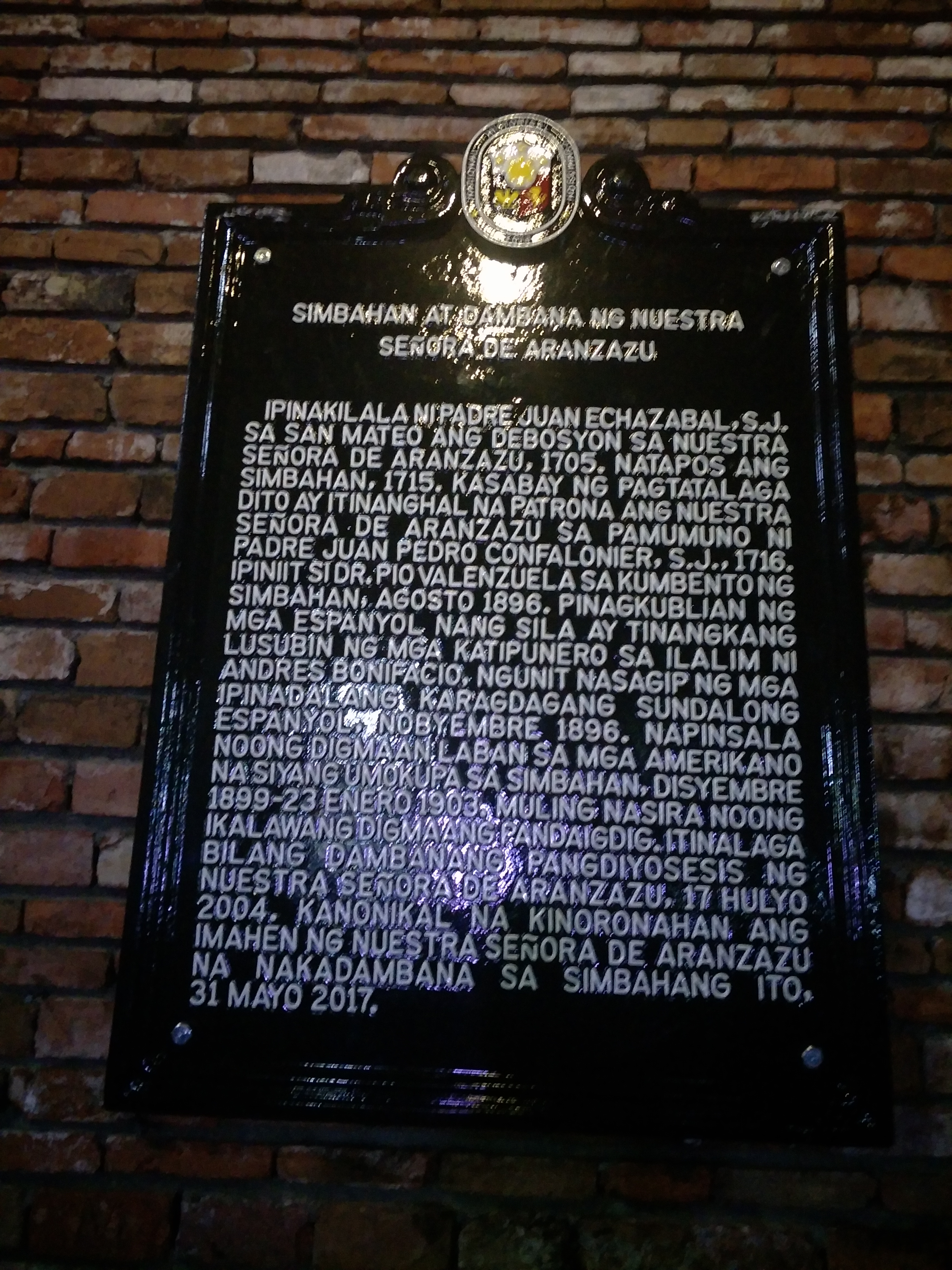
Historical Marker by the National Historical Commission of the Philippines at the shrine.

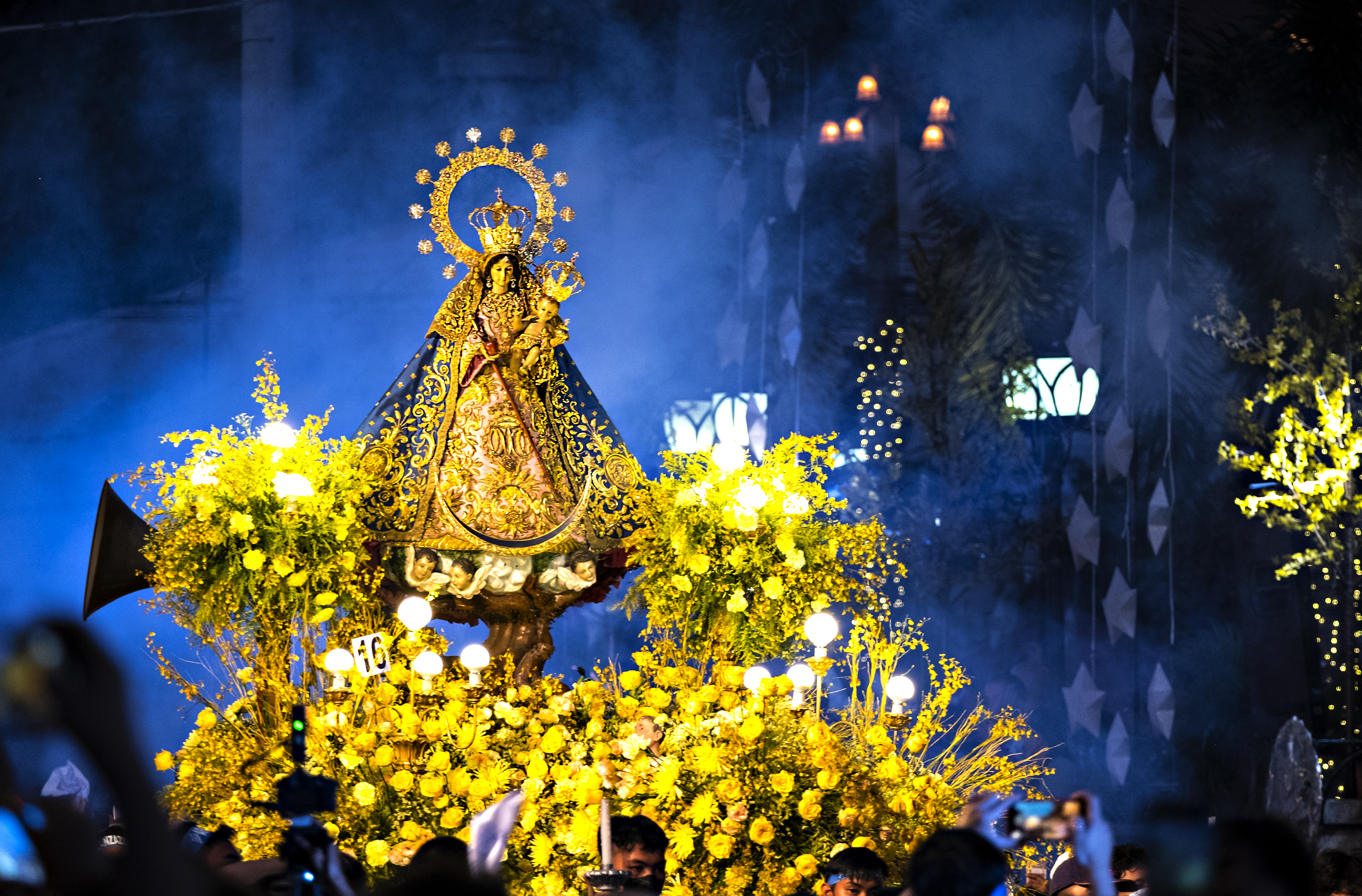
The Pontifically Crowned image of Our Lady of Aranzazu at the 41st Intramuros Grand Marian Procession held on December 4, 2022 at Intramuros.

== See also ==
- Catholic Church in the Philippines
- Sanctuary of Arantzazu
- St. Joseph Church (Baras, Rizal)
- Our Lady of the Abandoned
- Our Lady of La Naval, a similar Marian image enshrined in Quezon City.
