= Saint Jude Catholic School (Manila) =

Roman Catholic Chinese school in Manila, Philippines

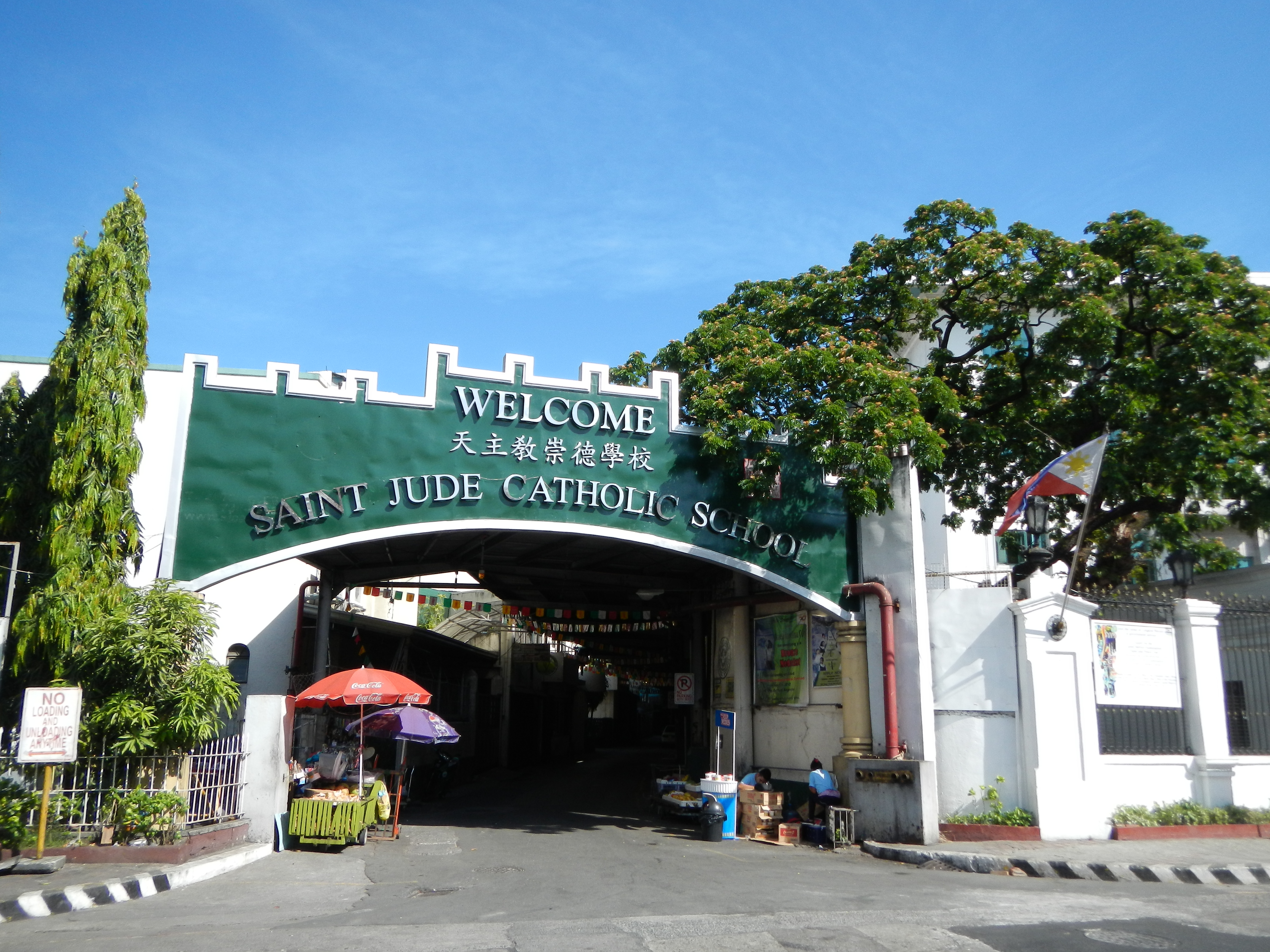

Location
- 327 Ycaza St., San Miguel, Manila, Metro Manila; Philippines
- 14°35′46.07″N 120°59′46.15″E

Information
- Type: Private Roman Catholic Non-profit Coeducational Basic (K-12) education institution
- Motto: "Witnessing to the Word in the World."
- Religious affiliations: Roman Catholic (Divine Word Missionaries)
- Patron saint: St. Jude Thaddeus
- Established: June 1963; 63 years ago
- Founders: Fr. Peter Yang, SVD; Fr. Peter Tsao, SVD; Mons. Charles Tchou, LRMS
- Director: Fr. Roland U. Aquino, SVD, MBA, JD
- Principal: Br. Yosep Undung, SVD, PhD
- Head Teachers: Rea A. Villaruel, LPT, MAEd (English High School); Digna Pagapong, LPT, MAT (English Grade School); Ma. Teresa de Leon, LPT (English Prep School)
- Chaplain: Fr. Ricardo Miranda, SVD
- Faculty: 238
- Grades: K to 12
- Enrollment: 3,300
- Campus: Urban 2.5 hectares (25,000 m^{2})
- Colors: Green and White
- Song: SJCS Hymn
- Athletics: Varsity team names: Green Knights (High School boys' varsity teams); Lady Green Knights (High School girls' varsity teams)
- Sports: Varsity sports teams: Basketball Volleyball Football Badminton Table Tennis Swimming
- Mascot: Jude the Knight; Lady Judy Knight
- Nickname: Judenite
- Athletic Associations: WNCAA PCYAA FCAAF; MSSA PCABL
- Website: sjcs.edu.ph

Saint Jude Catholic School (SJCS), (simplified Chinese: 天主敎崇德学校; traditional Chinese: 天主敎崇德學校; pinyin: Tiānzhǔjiào Chóngdé Xuéxiào; Pe̍h-ōe-jī: Thian-chú-kàu Chiông-tiak Ha̍k-hāu) is a private Catholic coeducational basic education institution run by the Philippine Central Province of the Society of the Divine Word in the district of San Miguel in Manila, Philippines. It is located adjacent to Malacañang Palace. It offers trilingual education in English, Mandarin Chinese, and Filipino. The coeducational school offers Nursery, Preparatory, Elementary (Grade 1 to Grade 6), Junior High School (Grade 7 to Grade 10) and Pre-University: Senior High School (Grade 11 to Grade 12) programs and International Baccalaureate Diploma Programme (IBDP). It is the oldest of the two Judenite institutions in the country. The school draws inspiration from the life and works of the institution's patron saint, Saint Jude Thaddeus. The school was founded by 3 Chinese priests, Fr. Peter Tsao, SVD and Fr. Peter Yang, SVD, and later joined by Fr. Charles Tchou who died on November 7, 2008.

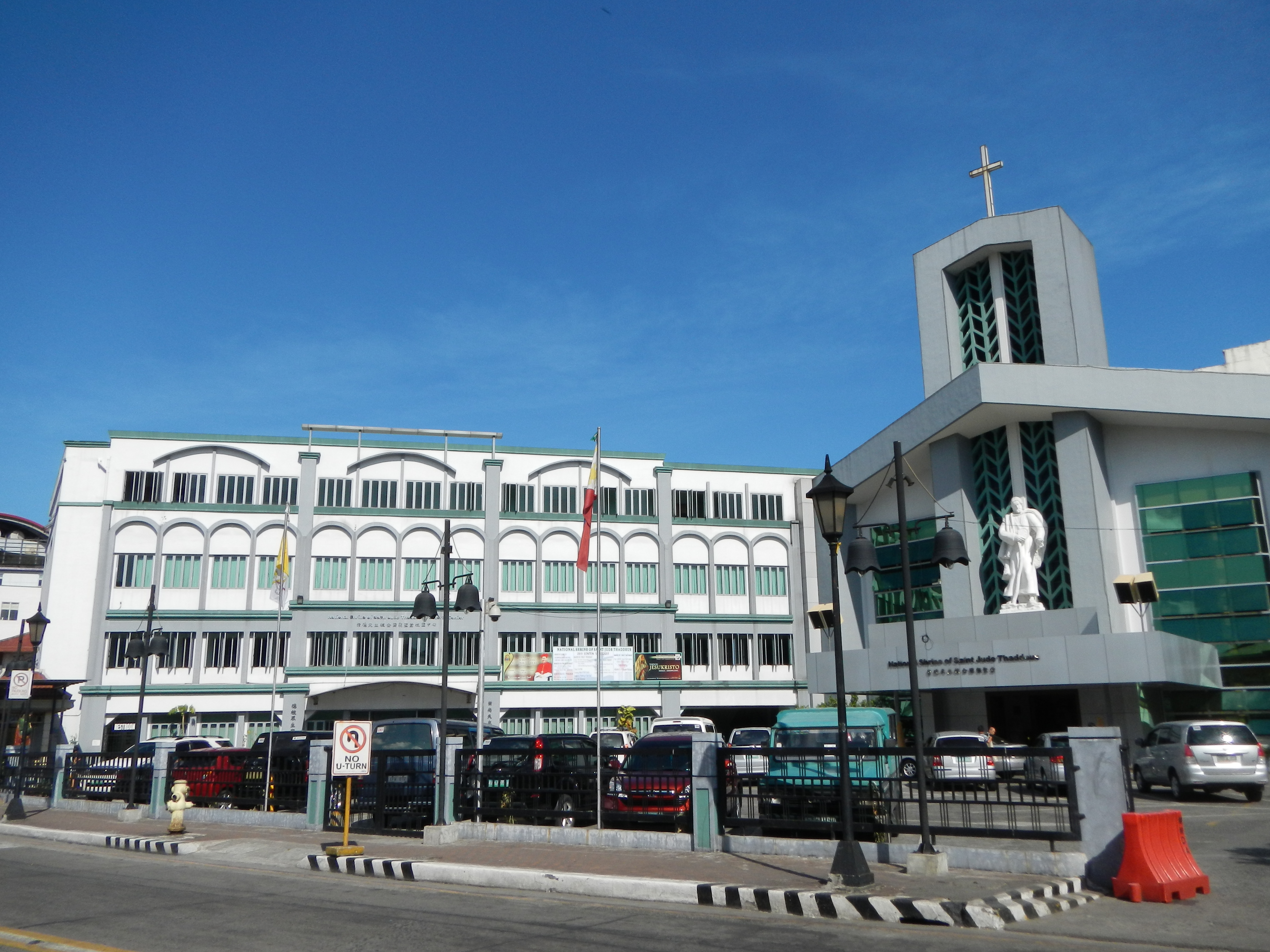
The National Shrine of Saint Jude Thaddeus is located inside the campus

== Campus ==
The Saint Jude Catholic School campus in the district of San Miguel in Manila is composed of four buildings on a 2.5-hectare (6.2-acre) lot. These include the Prep School Building, the S.J. Building, the Fr. Peter Yang Building and the new Fu Shen Fu Building. The National Shrine of Saint Jude Thaddeus is located within the school's campus.

Sports facilities on campus include a basketball stadium, badminton and volleyball courts, covered courts, ping-pong tables and a gym. The basketball stadium has a seating capability of 1,200 people and a regular-sized court that can be used for sporting events, and other activities.

The Fu Shen Fu Building was finished in December 2006. It houses a volleyball court and three badminton courts, a fully air-conditioned chapel, three computer labs, a dance practice facility, and also includes the residences of the priests/principals.

== History ==
Saint Jude Catholic School was opened in July 1963 by Fr. Peter Yang, SVD. Its early years saw an enrollment of 192 boys and girls in the preschool and first grade levels.

== Academics ==
=== Admission ===
Admission to Saint Jude Catholic School is welcomed. Students must enter Saint Jude at least as PreKinder. The acceptance rate is over 90%. Transfer students are accepted, but are required to undergo an entrance examination.

=== Pre-University Programs ===
Saint Jude Catholic School offers two pre-university programs: Senior High School and the International Baccalaureate Diploma Programme.

==== Senior High School Education ====
Saint Jude Catholic School offers Senior High School education. They offer academic strands such as ABM (Accountancy and Business Management), STEM specialized in Engineering (Science, Technology, Engineering and Mathematics), STEM specialized in Biology, and HUMSS (Humanities and Social Sciences).

==== International Baccalaureate Diploma Programme ====
Saint Jude Catholic School is an IB World School and offers the Diploma Programme (DP).

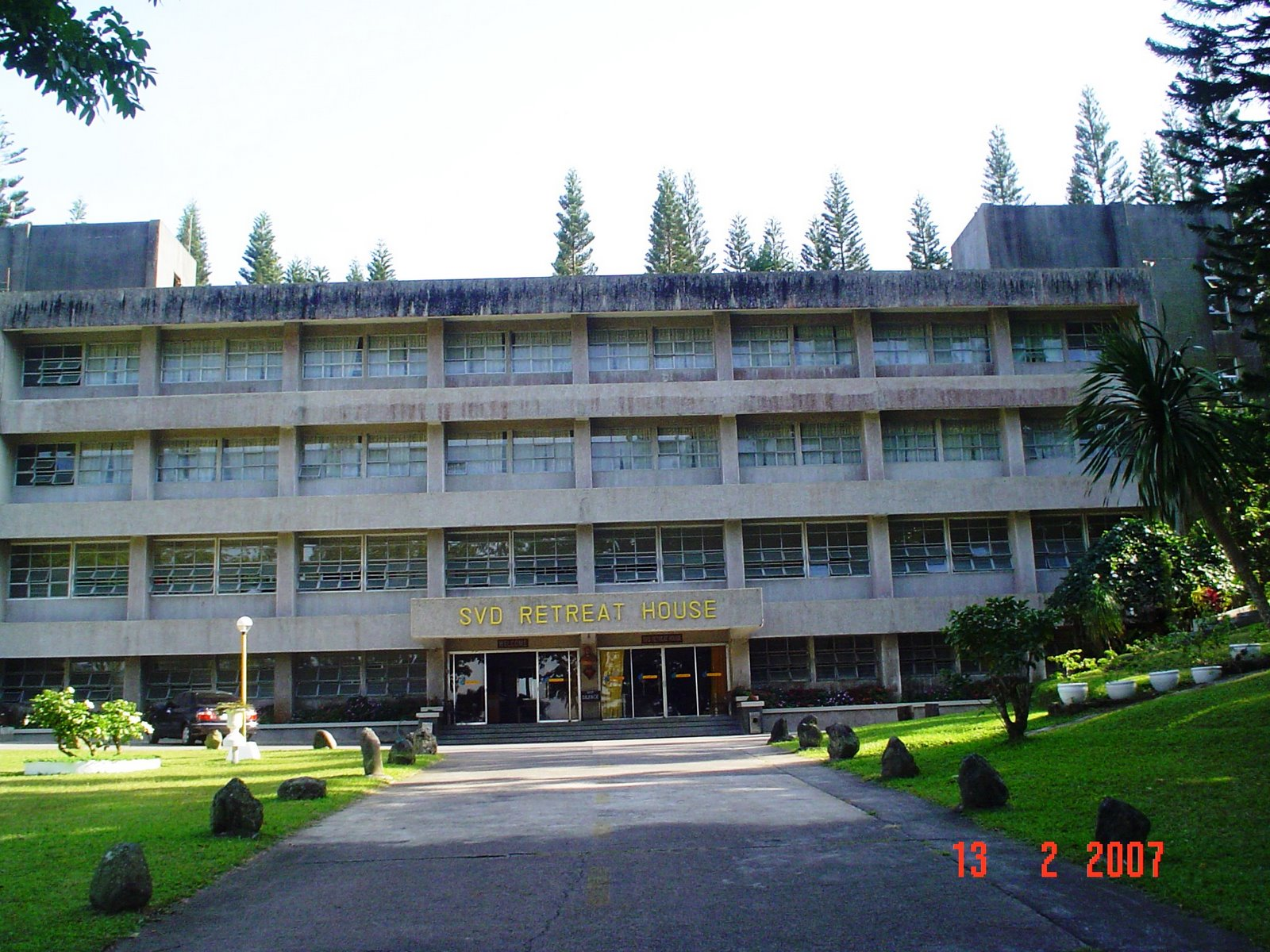
SVD Retreat House

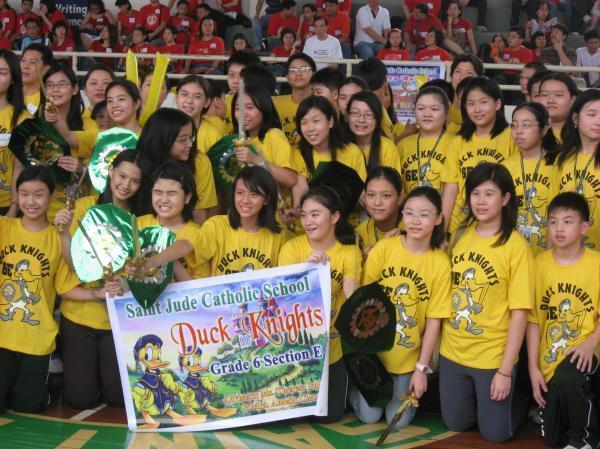
Winners of an activity on Family Day

== Notable alumni ==
- Edwin Lacierda, lawyer, politician and technology entrepreneur
- Ricky Sandoval, politician
- Tim Yap, club owner and TV show host
- Francis Glenn Yu, President/CEO at Seaoil
