= Santa Cruz Church (Manila) =

Roman Catholic church in Manila, Philippines

- Minor Basilica of Our Lady of the Pillar
- Archdiocesan Shrine of the Blessed Sacrament
- Basilika Menor at Parokya ng Nuestra Señora del Pilar de Manila, at Pang-Arkidiyosesis na Dambana ng Kabanal-Banalang Sakramento (Filipino); Basílica Menor é Iglesia Parroquial de Nuestra Señora del Pilar de Manila y Santuario Arquidiocesano del Santísimo Sacramento (Spanish)
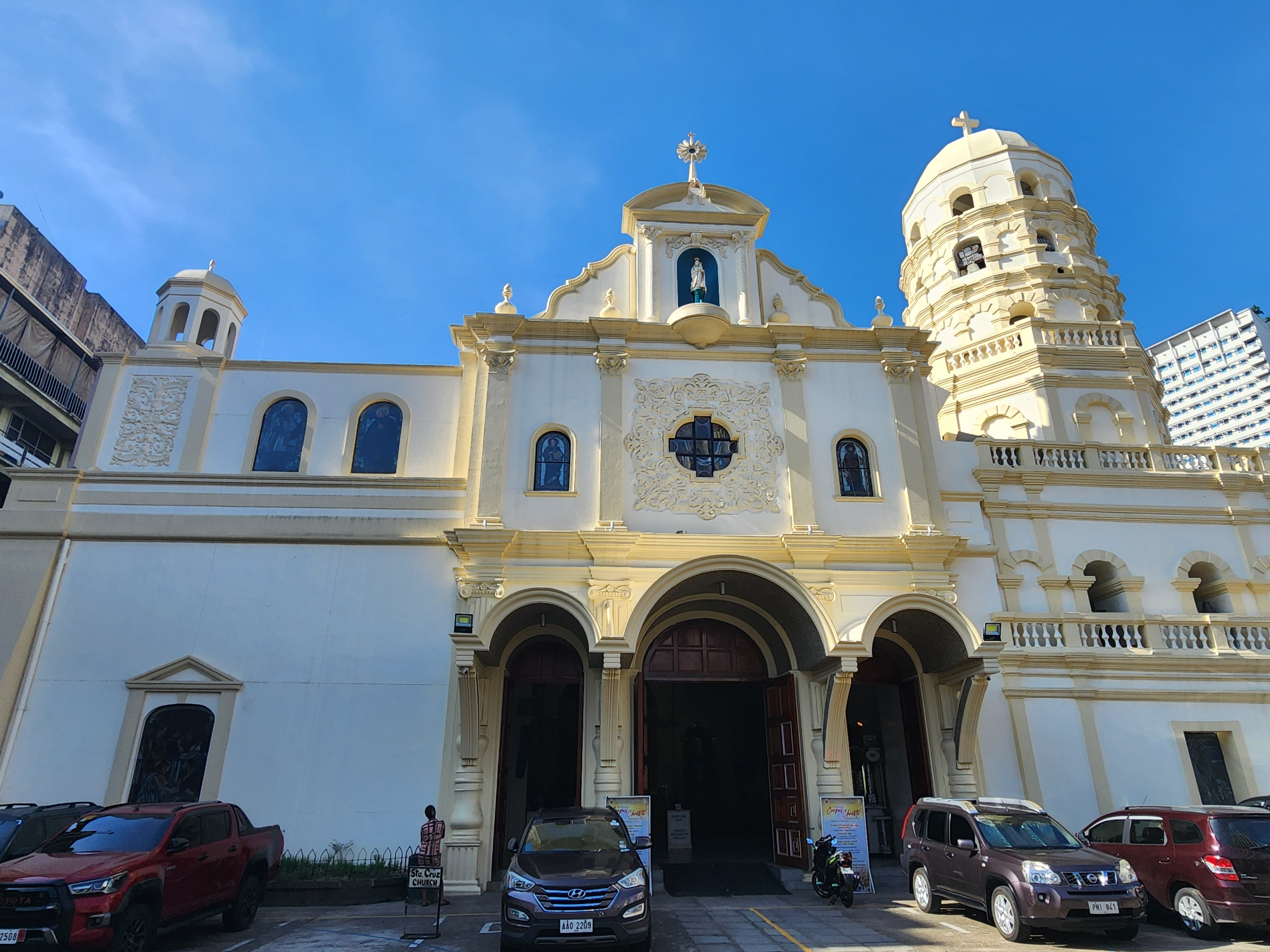
- Newly-renovated façade in May 2024
- Santa Cruz Church
- 14°35′56″N 120°58′49″E
- Location: Santa Cruz, Manila
- Country: Philippines
- Denomination: Roman Catholic
- Religious institute: Congregation of the Blessed Sacrament
- Website: Santa Cruz Parish

History
- Status: Minor Basilica; Archdiocesan Shrine
- Founded: 1619; 407 years ago
- Founder: Jesuits
- Dedication: Our Lady of the Pillar
- Other dedication: Blessed Sacrament

Architecture
- Functional status: Active
- Architectural type: Church building
- Style: Mission Revival
- Completed: 1957; 69 years ago

Specifications
- Materials: Concrete

Administration
- Archdiocese: Manila
- Deanery: Jose de Trozo
- Parish: Our Lady of the Pillar

Clergy
- Rector: Marc Bryan Adona, SSS

The Minor Basilica of Our Lady of the Pillar, also known as the Archdiocesan Shrine of the Blessed Sacrament or simply Santa Cruz Parish, is a Roman Catholic minor basilica in the district of Santa Cruz, Manila, Philippines. It is under the jurisdiction of the Archdiocese of Manila. The church was built when the arrabal (suburb) of Santa Cruz was established by the Jesuits in the early 17th century. The church had undergone many repairs and reconstruction, with the last reconstruction done in the 1950s.

It is the first mission and motherhouse of Filipino Sacramentinos, making it as the center of the congregation’s activities and events. Every year, the shrine hosts the archdiocesan celebrations of the Feast of Corpus Christi in the Archdiocese of Manila. A Mass is said by the Archbishop of Manila at 3:15 p.m., followed by a procession of the Blessed Sacrament to the Manila Cathedral.

== History ==
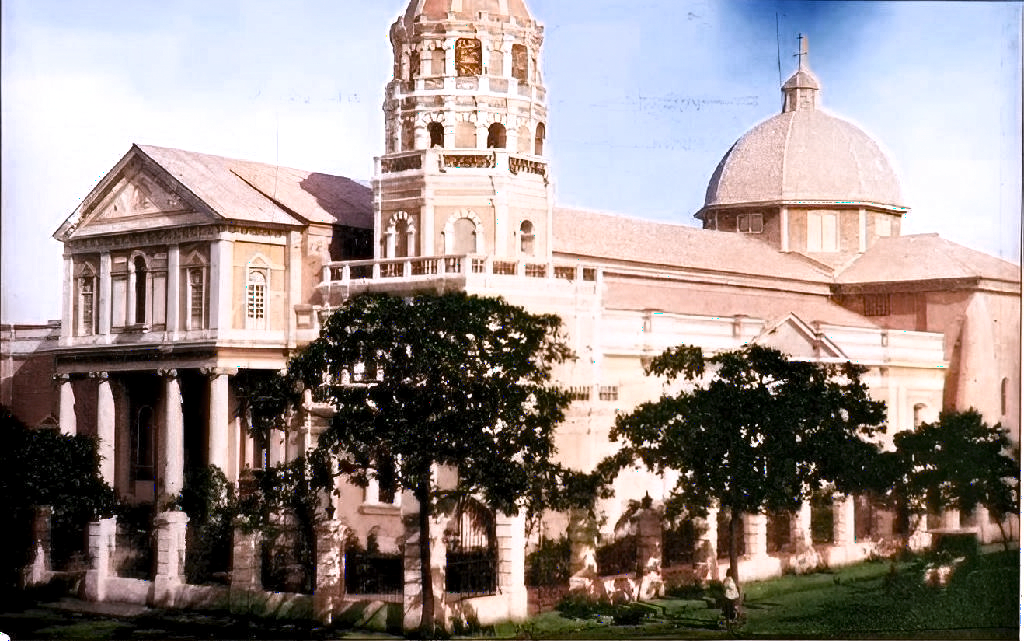
Old Santa Cruz church.

The Jesuits built the first Catholic church in the area where the present Santa Cruz Parish stands on June 20, 1619. The original church design was made of stone and wood. The Jesuits enshrined the image of Our Lady of the Pillar in 1643, and ministered to predominantly Chinese residents in the area. In 1822, the newly ordained priest Mariano Gómes de los Ángeles of Santa Cruz, one of the later GomBurZa triumvirate, celebrated his first Mass in the church.

On June 3, 1863, an earthquake destroyed the church. Agustín de Mendoza began reconstruction on the church in 1868. In 1938, revolutionary, labour leader, and writer Isabelo de los Reyes was buried within the church.

The original structure of the church was twice damaged by earthquakes, and then completely destroyed in the Battle of Manila during World War II, though records survived. The present building, completed in 1957, is in the Spanish baroque and Mission Revival styles. Art Deco and Romanesque design influences the interior decoration of the church.

On August 15, 1957, the Congregation of the Blessed Sacrament began administering the church. In 1984, then-Archbishop of Manila Cardinal Jaime Sin restored the official name of the church to Santa Cruz Parish. He kept Our Lady of the Pillar as its titular patroness, and named as secondary patron St. Peter Julian Eymard, founder of the Sacramentinos.

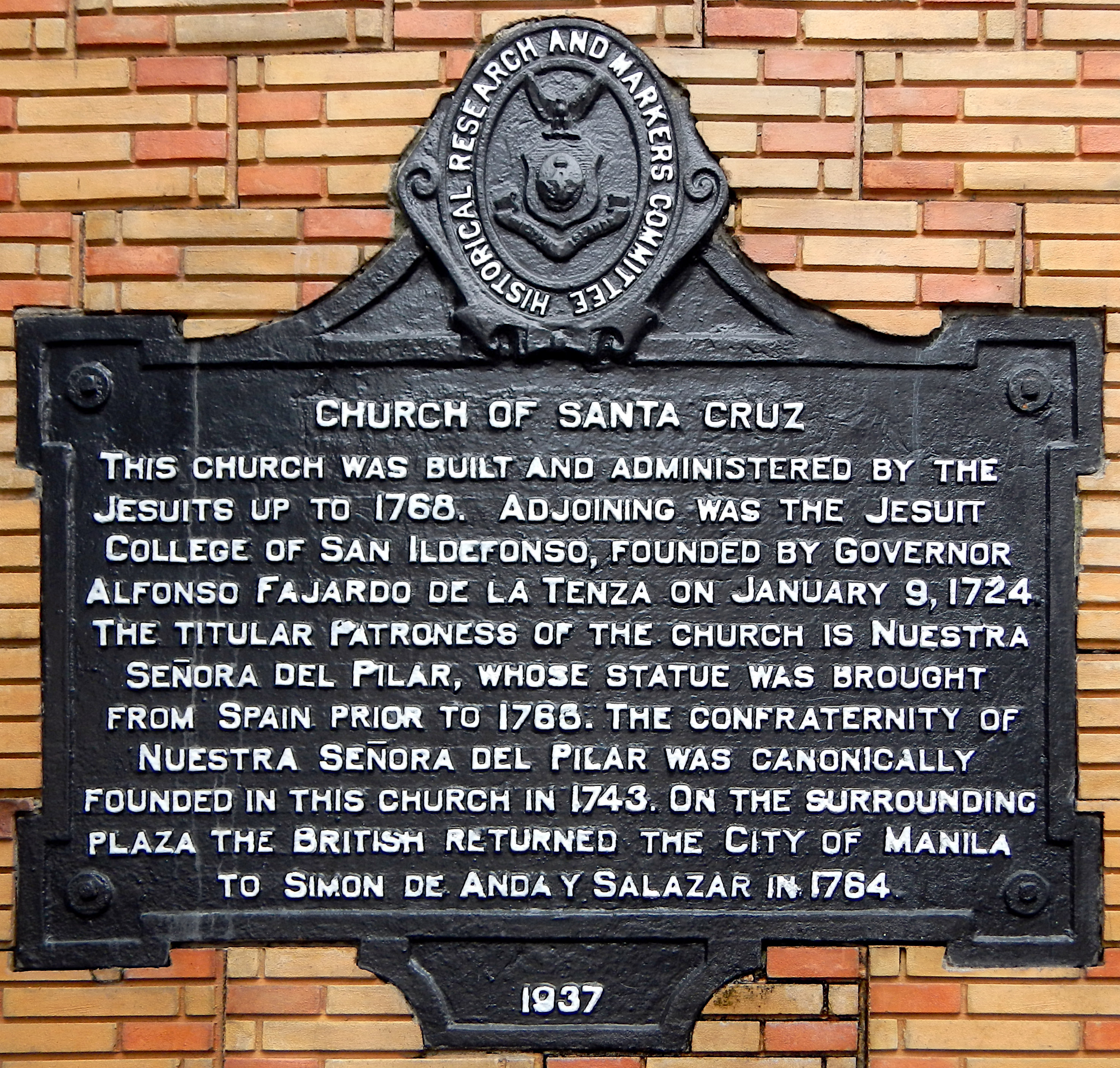
Church HRMC historical marker installed in 1937

Pope Francis granted the canonical coronation of the enshrined image of Our Lady of the Pillar on December 7, 2017.

On January 5, 2000, the parish's pastoral council petitioned its former parish priest, Francisco Mendoza, to seek official recognition of the church as a shrine. On June 3, 2018, it was officially raised to the rank of archdiocesan shrine by then-Archbishop of Manila, Cardinal Luis Antonio Tagle.

On March 25, 2025, Pope Francis conferred the title of Minor Basilica to the church.

On October 10, 2025, Cardinal Jose Advincula led the solemn re-enthronement of the image of Our Lady of the Pillar at the high altar after more than a century. Previously, the image was placed at a side altar for decades.

== Architecture ==
The church façade is characteristically Mission Revival with Ionic piers vertically dividing the first two levels in three parts. Three semicircular arch doorways form as main entrance to the church. A Celtic-like window flanked by small semicircular windows is found at the center of the second level. Forming as the pediment, the topmost level has its raking cornice in undulating liens emanating from the broken pediment found above the statued niche. The domed belfry rises on the right in six levels.

The church façade is topped with a statue of Our Lady of the Pillar, the patroness of the church, whose feast is held every 3rd Sunday of October.

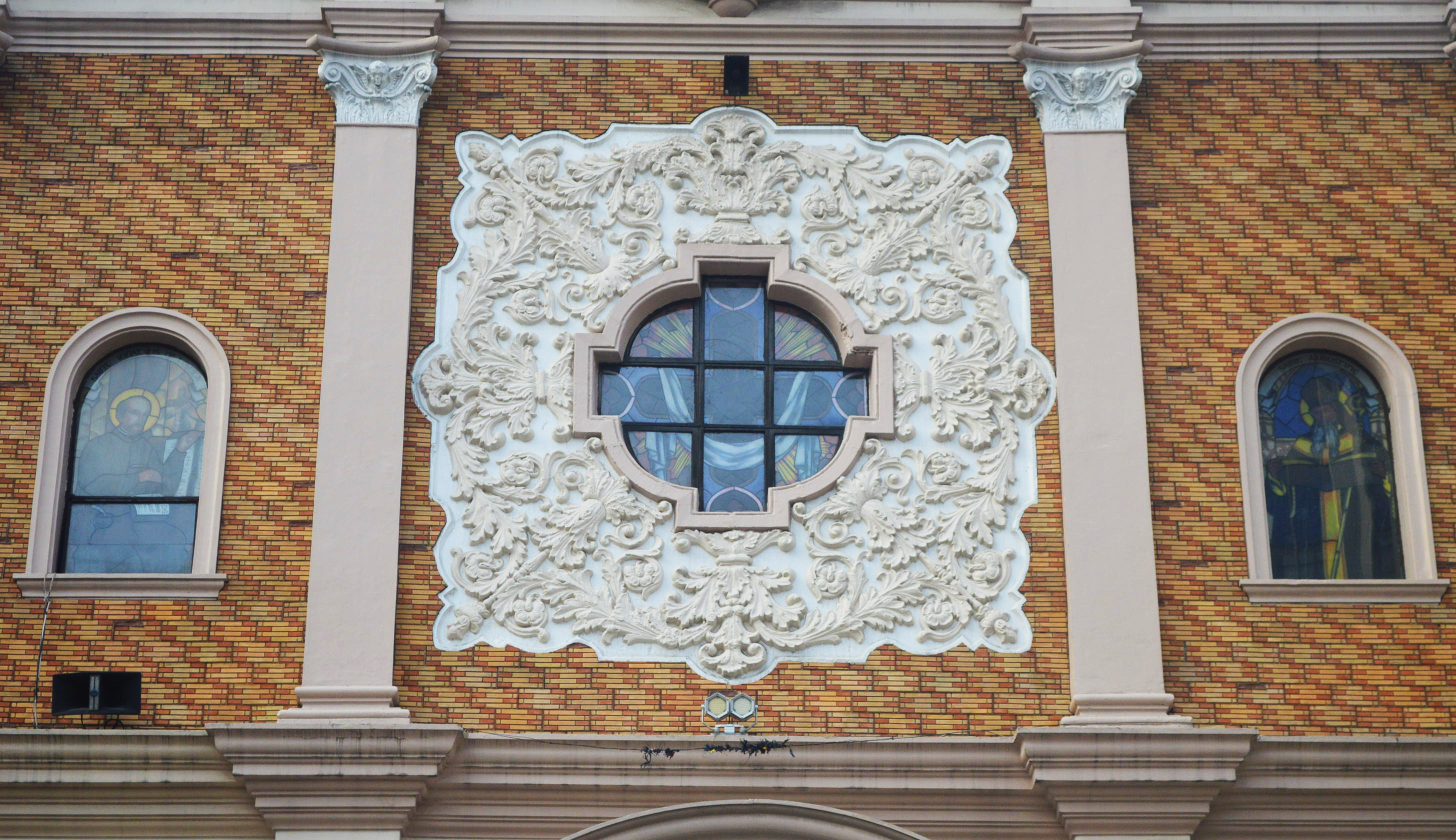
The façade relief surrounding the center window

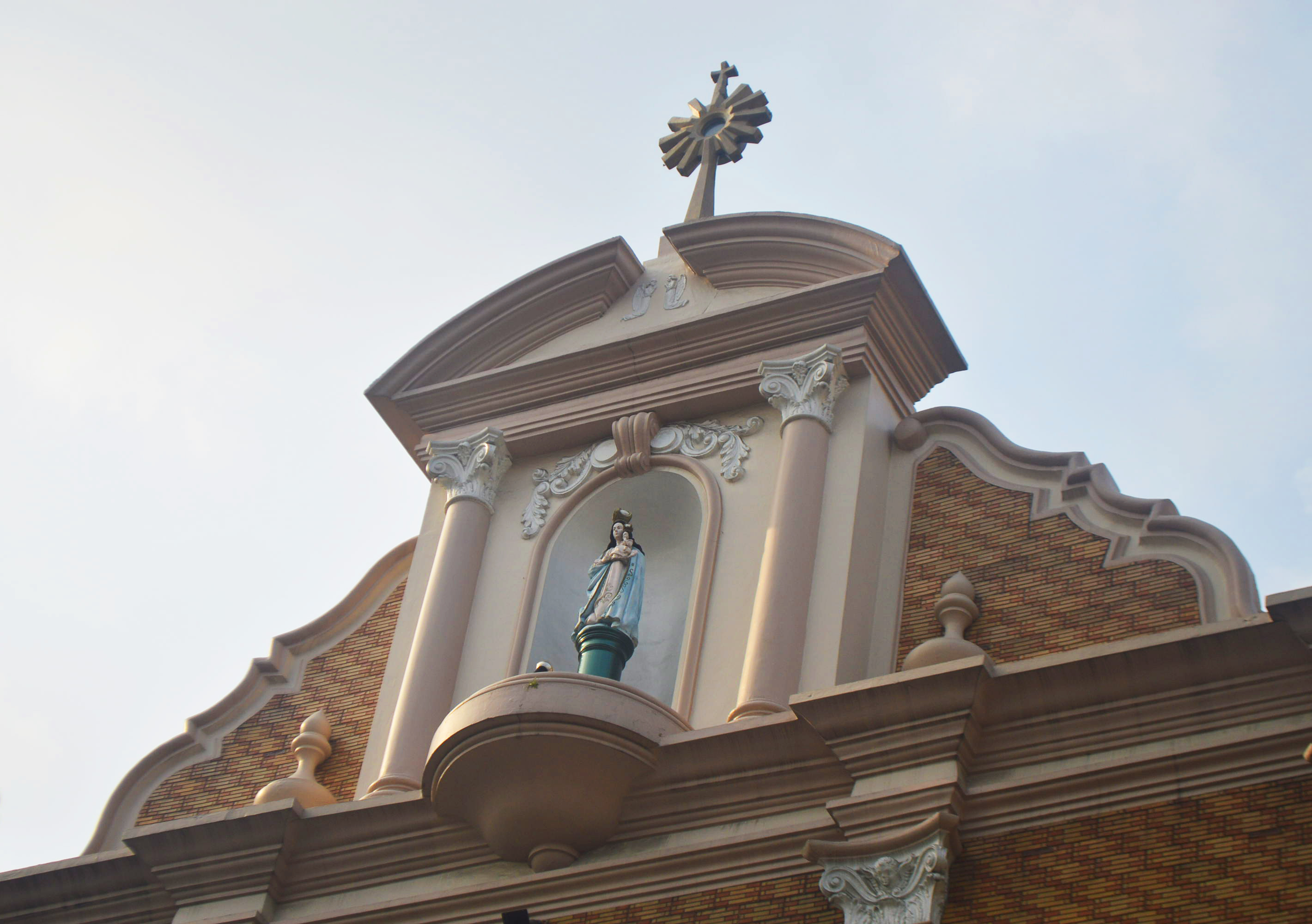
The pediment of the church located on the topmost portion of the façade

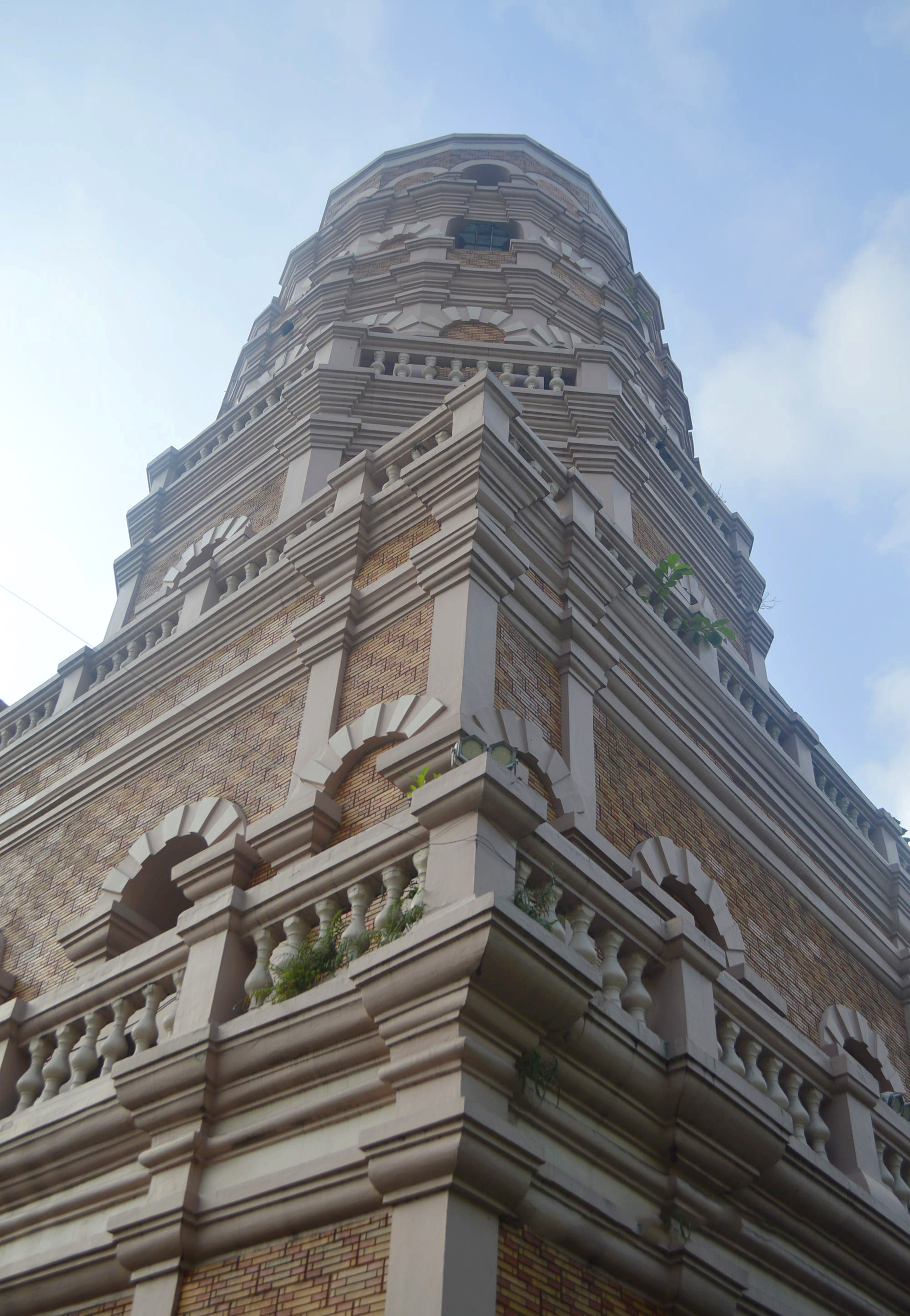
Domed belfry of the church

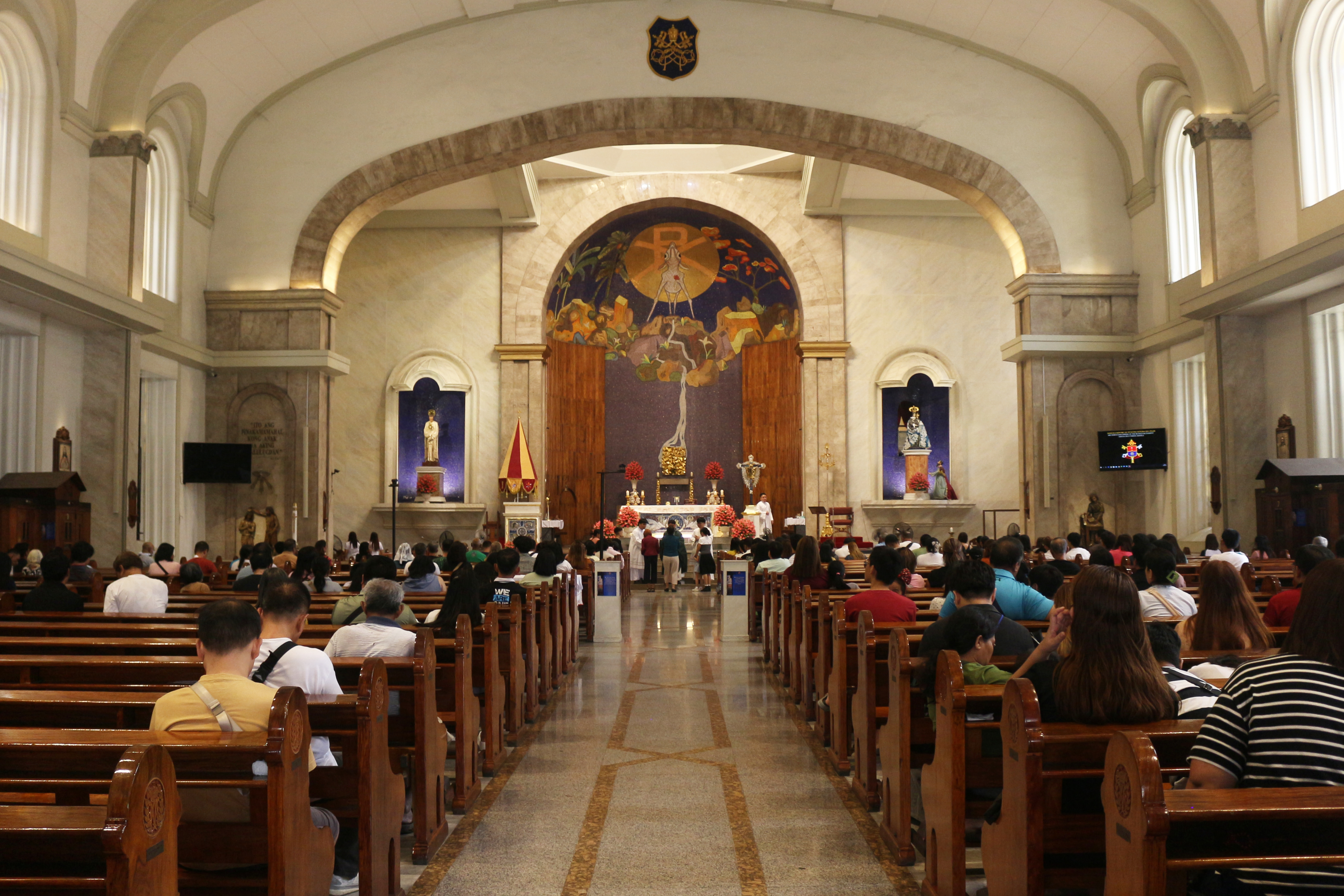
Nave in 2026

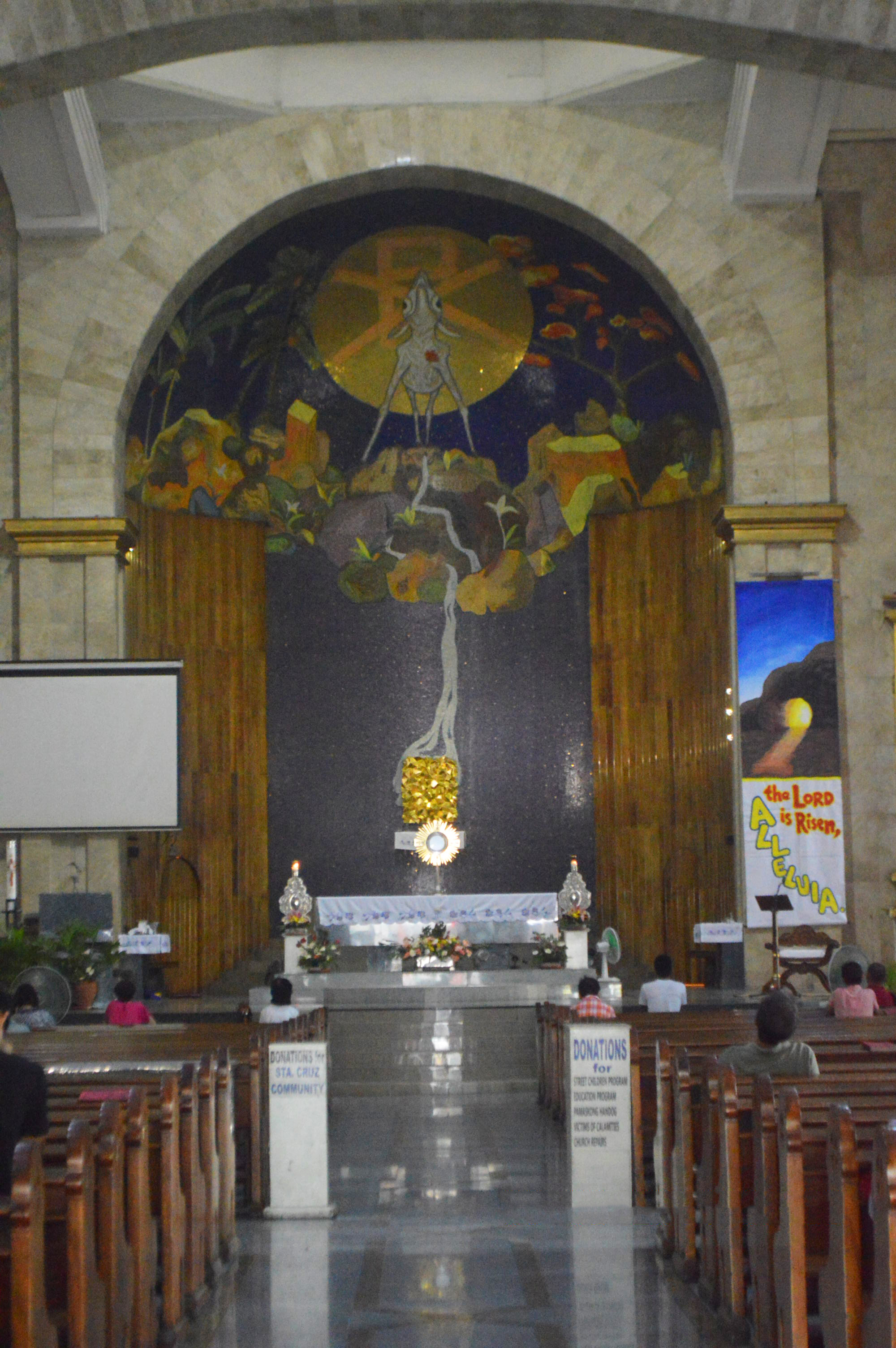
Altar

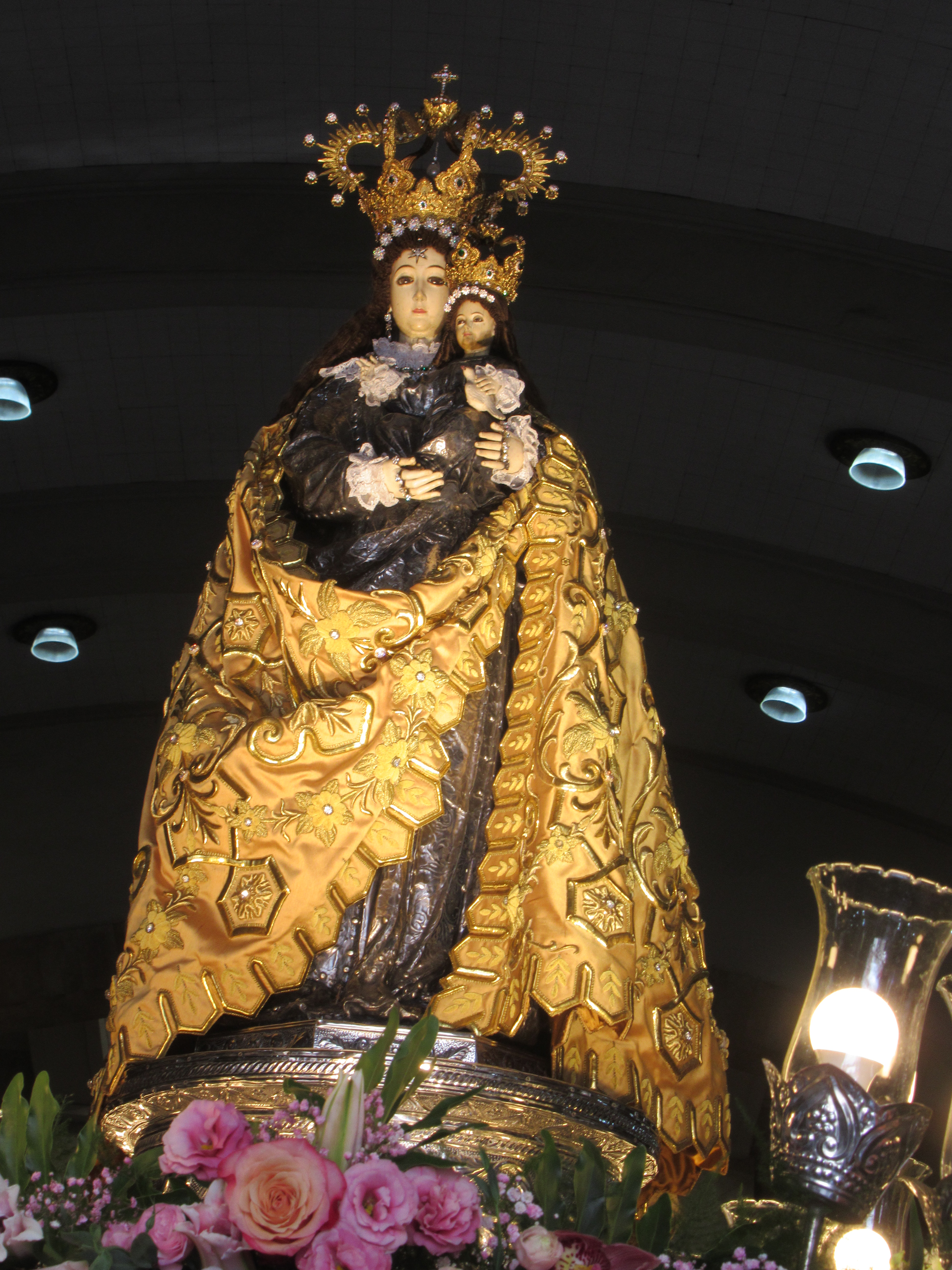
The canonically crowned image of Nuestra Señora del Pilar de Manila

== List of shrine rectors ==
- Rudsend P. Paragas (2018–2025)
- Marc Bryan Adona (2025–present)

== Notable priests ==
- Mariano Gómes de los Ángeles, celebrated his first Mass here as his home parish.
- Ezequiél Moreno, parish priest when the Augustinian Recollects administered the parish.
- Julian Moreno, brother of Ezequiel Moreno

== See also ==
- List of Jesuit sites
- List of Catholic basilicas
