= Quiapo Church =

Roman Catholic church in Manila, Philippines

- Minor Basilica and National Shrine of Jesus Nazareno
- Saint John the Baptist Parish (canon)
- Basílika Menor at Pambansang Dambana ni Jesus Nazareno (Filipino)
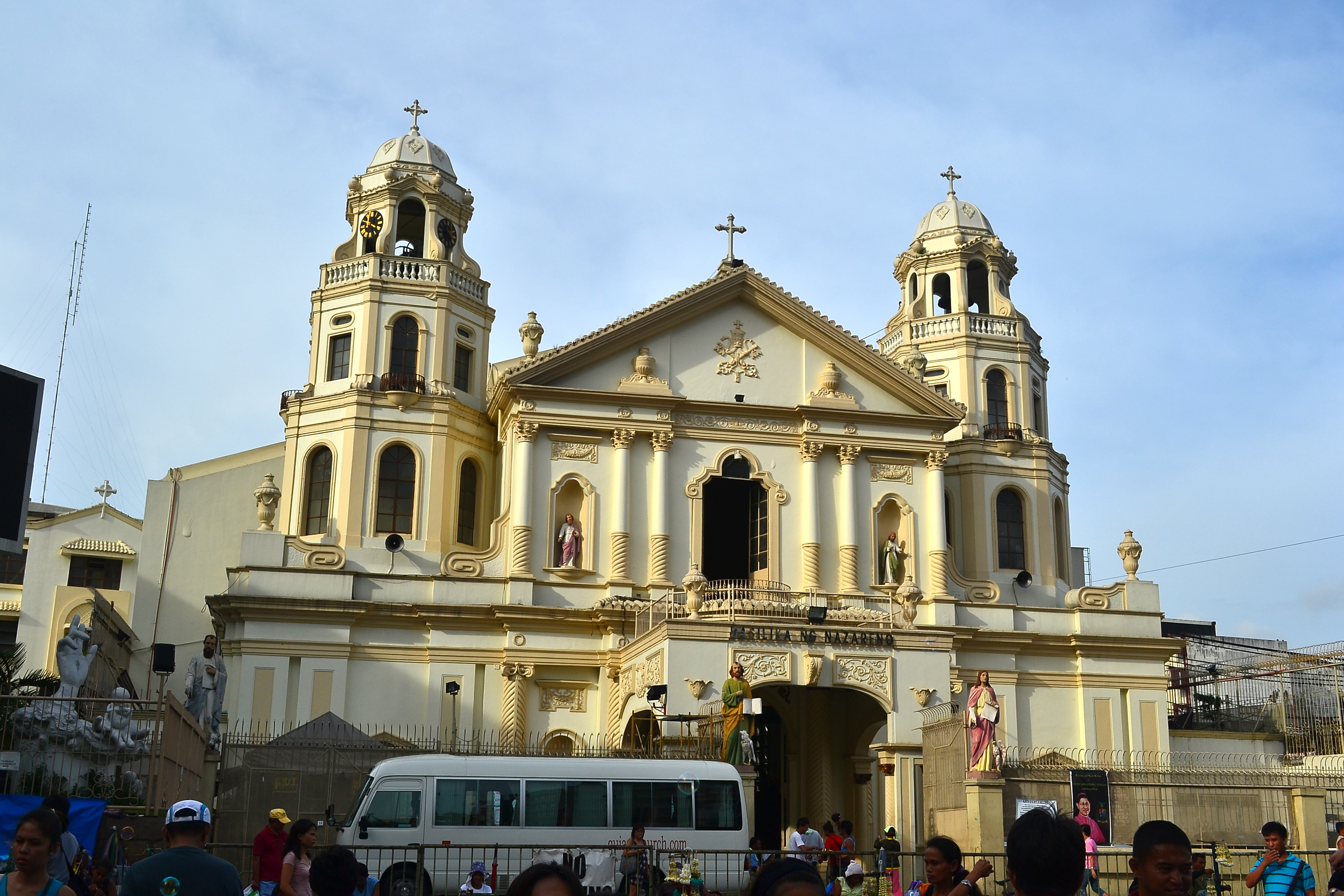
- Main façade of the church
- Quiapo Church
- 14°35′56″N 120°59′02″E
- Location: Quiapo, Manila
- Country: Philippines
- Language(s): Filipino, English (Note: For the 9:00 a.m. and 10:00 a.m. Pilgrim's Masses every Saturday)
- Denomination: Catholic Church
- Sui iuris church: Latin Church
- Website: quiapochurch.com.ph

History
- Former name(s): Church of the Camisa; Minor Basilica and Archdiocesan Shrine of the Black Nazarene; Minor Basilica and National Shrine of Jesus Nazareno (Black Nazarene)
- Status: Minor basilica; National shrine
- Founded: 1588; 438 years ago
- Founder: Antonio de Nombela
- Dedication: John the Baptist
- Consecrated: September 28, 1987; 38 years ago
- Events: Traslación

Architecture
- Functional status: Active
- Architect(s): Juan Nakpil; José María Zaragoza
- Architectural type: Basilica
- Style: Mexican baroque
- Years built: c. 1588 (dst. 1603); c. 1686 (dst. 1863); 1864–1899 (dst. 1929); 1933–1935; 1984–1986
- Groundbreaking: 1933 (main façade); 1984 (expansion)
- Completed: 1935 (main façade); 1986 (expansion)
- Construction cost: ₱8 million (expansion)

Specifications
- Capacity: 1,000 (seating)
- Length: 78.8 m (259 ft)
- Width: 33.0 m (108.3 ft)
- Materials: Reinforced concrete

Administration
- Province: Manila
- Metropolis: Manila
- Archdiocese: Manila
- Deanery: Jose de Trozo
- Parish: St. John the Baptist

Clergy
- Archbishop: Jose Advincula
- Rector: Ramon Jade Licuanan
- Vicars: Robert Arellano, LRMS; Franklin Villanueva; Richard Anthony Lim

The Minor Basilica and National Shrine of Jesus Nazareno (Filipino: Basilika Menor at Pambansang Dambana ni Jesus Nazareno), commonly known as Quiapo Church (Filipino: Simbahan ng Quiapo) and canonically as the Parish of Saint John the Baptist (Filipino: Parokya ng San Juan Bautista), is a Catholic basilica and national shrine located in the district of Quiapo in Manila, Philippines. It houses the Jesús Nazareno, a dark statue of Jesus Christ that is venerated by devotees and regarded by many as miraculous. The basilica is under the jurisdiction of the Archdiocese of Manila through the Vicariate of José de Trozo, and its current rector is Rev. Fr. Ramon Jade L. Licuanan.

== History ==
=== Early churches ===
The earliest church, built by missionaries of the Order of Friars Minor, was made of bamboo for the frame and nipa leaves as thatching. In 1574, Limahong and his soldiers destroyed and burned the church. Formerly a visita (chapel-of-ease) of Santa Ana, the Franciscan friar Antonio de Nombella founded the church in 1588 through the petition of Saint Pedro Bautista, then the superior of the Franciscans in the Philippines. The church was dedicated to Sweetest Name of Jesus, with St. John the Baptist as its patron saint. It burned down in 1603 and the parish was temporarily turned over to the Jesuits until secular clergy objected. Governor-General Santiago de Vera initiated the full construction of the church in 1686. On April 8, 1639, the administration of the church was returned to the seculars who had always taken care of the church's welfare.

During the Seven Years' War, the British attempted to destroy the church in 1762 as they invaded Manila. In 1791, the church caught fire, but the image of the Jesús Nazareno was spared. An earthquake in 1863 destroyed the church, and in its place a temporary church was built. Rev. Fr. Eusebio de León later reconstructed the ruined church in 1864 or 1879, completing the structure in 1899 with the assistance of Rev. Fr. Manuel Roxas. Roxas had raised the unprecedented amount of ₱40,000.00 (equivalent to ₱21,653,792 in 2021) from donations and lay contributions. In 1929, the church caught fire again, in which the church's wooden ceiling and sacristy were destroyed.

=== Present church ===
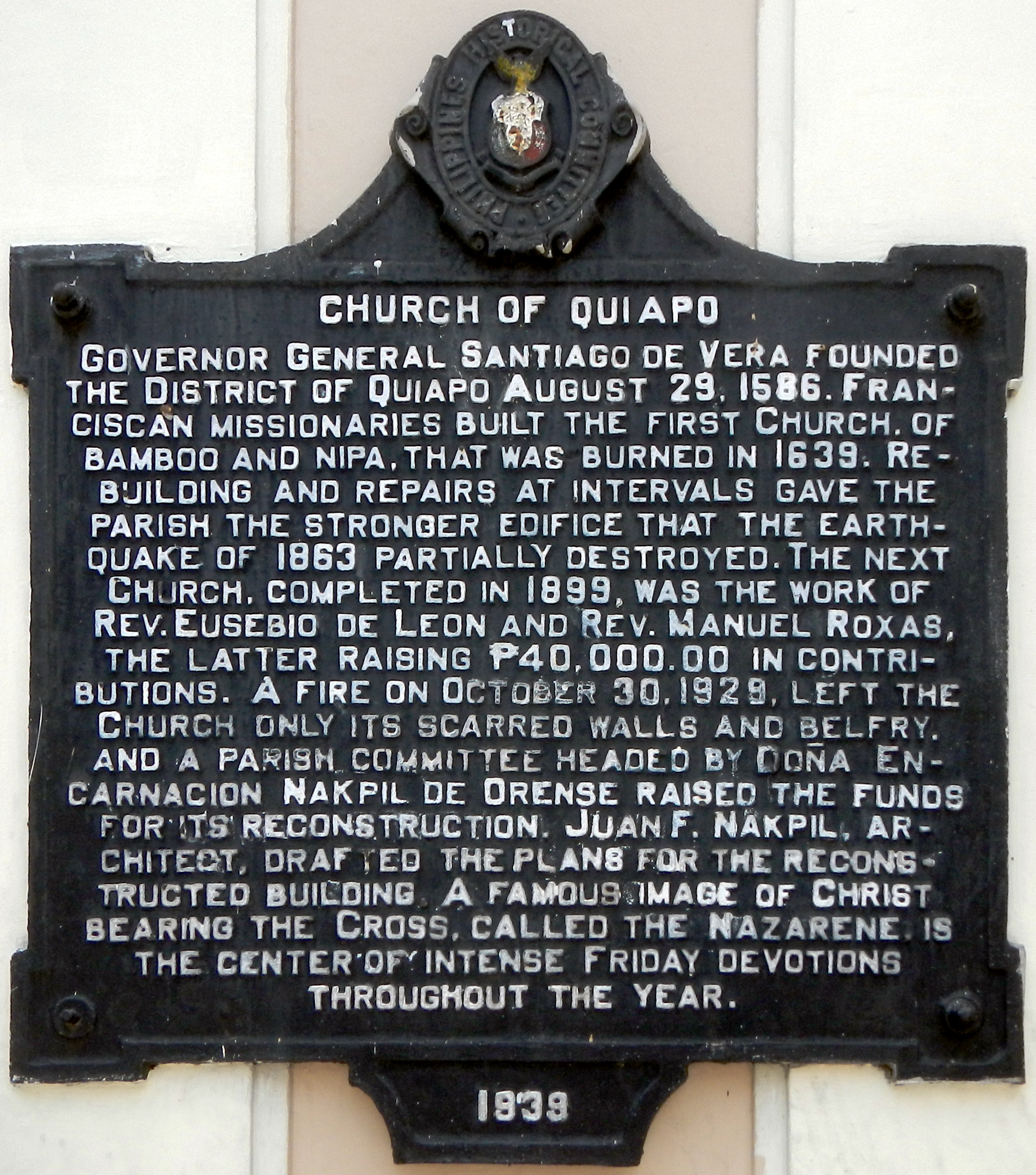
Church PHC historical marker installed in 1939

In 1933, Rev. Fr. Magdaleno Castillo began the reconstruction of the church from the plan prepared by National Artist of the Philippines architect Juan Nakpil – son of composer Julio Nakpil. He added the church's dome and a second belfry to balance out the façade. The reconstructed church, made of reinforced concrete, was completed in 1935. During World War II, parts of Quiapo were destroyed except for the church. During that time, the church became the temporary home of the image of Our Lady of Peace and Good Voyage from Antipolo. On January 18, 1964, Archbishop Rufino Santos reconsecrated the renovated church's new altar that was made through the efforts of Rev. Fr. Pedro Bantigue, the then-parish priest.

Monsignor Jose C. Abriol commissioned architect José María Zaragoza and engineer Eduardo Santiago to expand the church in order to accommodate more worshippers. This was done from 1984 to 1986, with several changes made to the building such as removing any inner columns. Despite the project being controversial, it did not affect the popularity of the church. Cardinal Jaime Sin, then-Archbishop of Manila, reconsecrated the church on September 28, 1987. On December 11 of the same year, Pope John Paul II issued papal bull Qui Loco Petri, elevating the church's rank to that of a minor basilica. This was solemnly declared on February 1, 1988, by then-Papal Nuncio to the Philippines, Archbishop Bruno Torpigliani, who also blessed the side altar of Saint Lorenzo Ruíz on that day.

In 2006, the church celebrated 400 years since the Black Nazarene’s arrival. As part of the celebrations, a jubilee wall was placed at the entrance gate so devotees can post their own testimonials of faith and devotion to the Black Nazarene. The Traslación from Quirino Grandstand back to the basilica was also introduced, re-enacting the image's initial transfer from its destroyed shrine in Intramuros.

On May 10, 2023, Cardinal José Advíncula, Archbishop of Manila, made the basilica an archdiocesan shrine. The declaration was announced by the archdiocesan vicar general, Reginald Malicdem, on May 31. On July 9, at the 126th Plenary Assembly of the Catholic Bishops' Conference of the Philippines in Kalibo, Aklan, the episcopacy conferred the title and rank of national shrine on the basilica, bypassing the usual ten-year waiting period. (Note: The Catholic Bishop's Conference of the Philippines employs a ten-year policy to make diocesan shrines known at the national level before a national designation can be considered. In the case of Quiapo, the policy was waived because according to its secretary-general, Monsignor Bernardo Pantin, the church is "already well known so it was exempted from the requirement".) On December 14, the basilica received the official decree making it a national shrine.

On January 29, 2024, at the end of the CBCP's 127th Plenary Assembly in Manila, a Pontifical Mass was presided over by Cardinal Advíncula to mark this solemn declaration of the country's 29th national shrine. At least seventy bishops attended the liturgy, as well as Mayor of Manila, Honey Lacuna, and the Papal Nuncio to the Philippines, Archbishop Charles John Brown. During the Mass, CBCP President and Bishop of Kalookan, Pablo Virgilio David, expressed hope for the shrine's eventual elevation to an international shrine, a title already conferred by the Holy See on Antipolo Cathedral.

On October 3, 2024, Manila Archbishop Jose Cardinal Advincula issued a decree officially renaming the church as the Minor Basilica and National Shrine of Jesus Nazareno and abandoned the usage of "Black Nazarene" to distance the Black Nazarene image from its popular depiction of having a dark complexion to "further focus the people on the holy name of our Lord than a color or attribute".

== Architecture ==
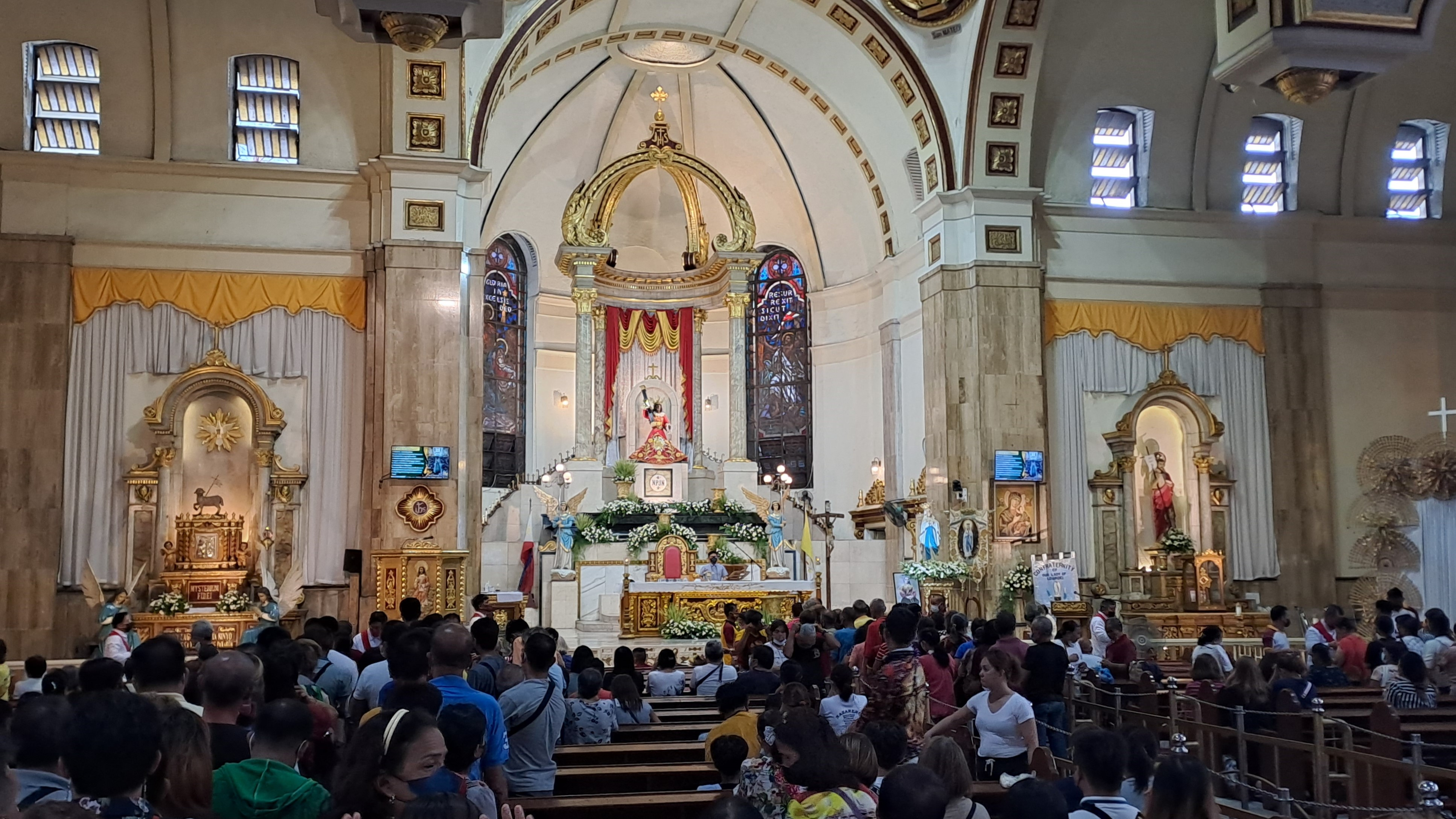
The sanctuary of the basilica, with the high altar in the middle and the side altars of the Blessed Sacrament (left) and Saint John the Baptist (right)

Built in the Baroque style, Quiapo Church's façade is distinctive with twisted columns on both levels. The Corinthian columns of the second level has a third of its shaft twisted near the base, while the upper portion has a smooth surface. The topmost portion of the four-storey belfries are rimmed with balustrades and decorated with huge scrolls. The tympanum of the pediment has a pair of chalice-shaped finials, and towards the end of the raking cornice, urn-like vases mark the end of the pediment. A quatrefoil window in the center of the pediment was sealed up in the late 1980s and replaced with a relief of the crossed keys and tiara of the pope – a symbol of its status as a minor basilica.

During its expansion, changes to the building were made, such as the removal of the ornate exposed trusses, the removal of the interior columns to create an expansive columnless structure, and the realignment of the perimeter walls. Even though Zaragoza did not tamper the facade and altar area, this received criticisms like comparing the new interior with a basketball court. Only the façade, the dome, the transept, and the apse retained the classic design.

== Devotion to the Jesus Nazareno ==
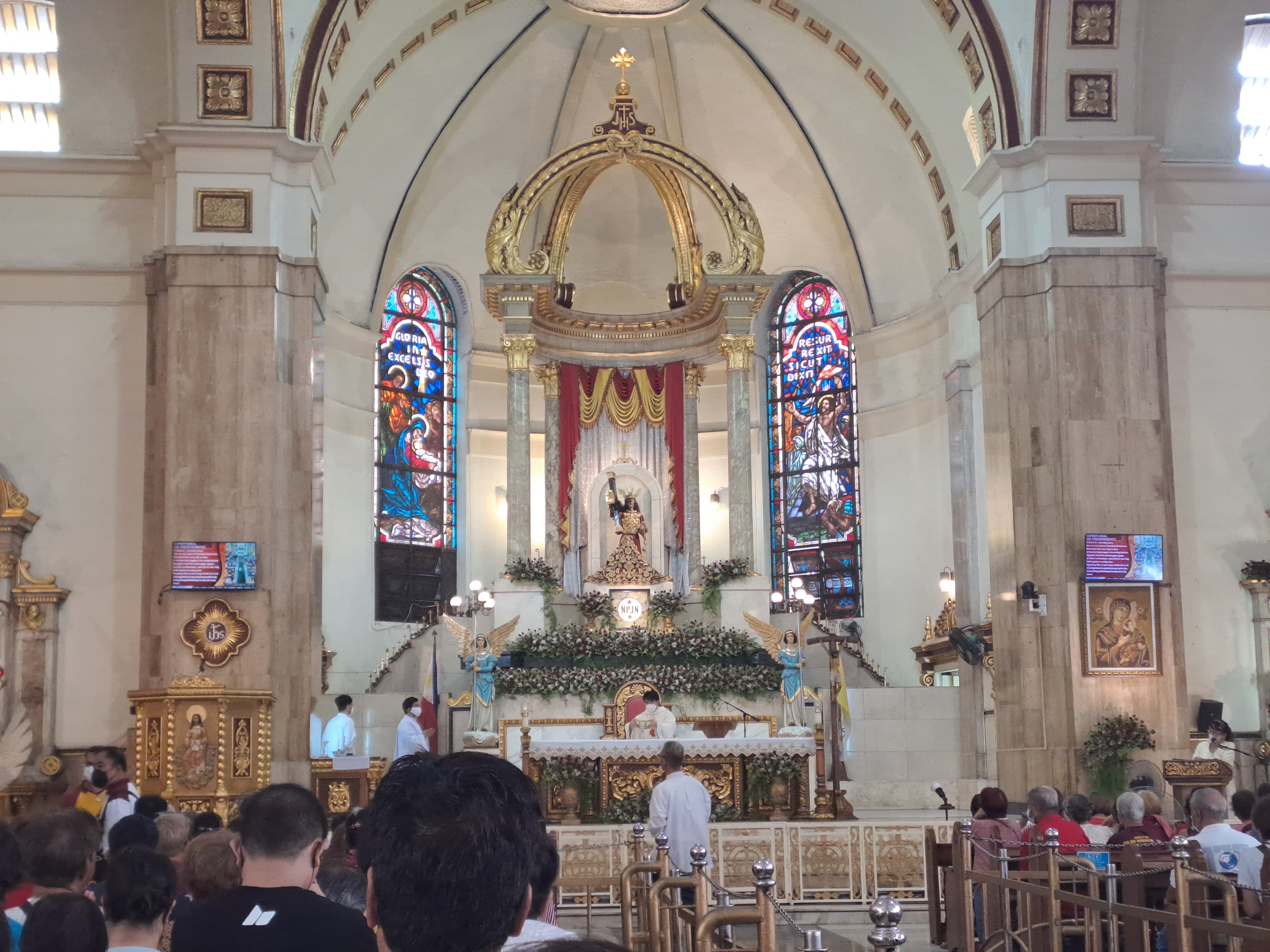
High altar of the church, with the Señor Venerado enshrined above it.

The Nuestro Padre Jesús Nazareno, officially and liturgically known as Jesús Nazareno, reputedly miraculous, was brought to the country in a Spanish galleon in the 17th century.

Quiapo Church holds a novena every Friday, Quiapo Day, in honor of the venerated image, and is attended by thousands of devotees. A note is sounded before the novena begins as the devotees to the Nuestro Padre Jesús Nazareno troop in and emit their strings of petitions. One can encounter the traditional folk Catholicism of Filipinos when they all climb the narrow flight of stairs to kiss the Señor's foot or wipe it with their handkerchiefs they use every time they visit.

The Feast of Jesús Nazareno on January 9 celebrates the traslación (solemn translation) of the statue to the church from the Church of Saint Nicholas Tolentino. Traffic is re-routed round the devotees who participate in this district's fiesta. There are men who are devoted to carry the Black Nazarene statue around a specific route. They have a panata, a vow to serve the Lord in this sacrifice. These people believed that an afternoon's participation in the procession can repent their sins and shady deals in a year.

In 2024, 6.5 million devotees participated in the Traslación. Due to popular devotion, the Archdiocese of Manila has proposed to the Holy See to declare January 9 as the "national feast of the Jesús Nazareno".

Traditionally all-Filipino in its liturgies for many decades since Vatican II, the basilica added a Saturday English-language mass in 2024 at the direct request of then Fr. Rufino to reflect the growth of the devotion to overseas Filipinos around the world, which in 2025 expanded to two.

== Rectors ==
The following are the prelates who had led the Quiapo Church.

- Antonio de Nombella (1586)
- Pablo Ruiz de Talavera (1603)
- Gregorio Catena de Mesa (1619)
- Geronimo Rodriguez de Liyan (1634)
- Jesuit priests (1636–1639)
- Juan de Rueda (1670)
- Jeronimo Fernandez Caravallo (1683)
- Juan de Bahamonde (1717)
- Pablo Romero (1717–1720)
- Francisco Pujol (1720–1728)
- Bartolome Saguinsin (1728–1772)
- Gaspar Jimenez (1772–1793)
- Luis Mariano (1793–1800)
- Lazaro de la Rosa (1800–1823)
- Arcadio Aquino (1824)
- Juan de los Santos (1825)
- Agustin Mendoza (1856–1857)
- Jose Maria Guevarra (1857–1871)
- Eusebio de Leon (1871–1885)
- Pablo Cruz (1885–1888)
- Manuel Roxas (1885–1890)
- Manuel Marco (1893–1896)
- Gilberto Martin (1896–1897)
- Lorenzo Maximo Gregorio (1897–1899)
- Calixto Villafranca (1901–1924)
- Magdaleno Castillo (1924–1937)
- Vicente Fernandez (1937–1954)
- Franciso Avendano (1954–1955)
- Vicente Reyes* (1955–1961)
- Pedro Bantigue* (1961–1967)
- Bienvenido Lopez* (1967–1974)
- Antonio Pascual (1974)
- Hernando Antiporda* (1974–1975)
- Jose Abriol (1976–1991)
- Bienvenido Mercado (1991–1999)
- Teodoro Buhain* (1999–2004)
- Josefino Ramirez (2004–2007)
- Jose Clemente Ignacio (2007–2015)
- Hernando Coronel (2015–2022)
- Rufino Sescon Jr.* (2022–2025)
- Ramon Jade Licuanan (2025–present)

(*) Bishops

== Controversy ==
The vicinity of the church is a popular area for peddlers of unsafe abortifacients, local gastric irritants and untested herbal folk (potions) remedies. The merchandise are clandestinely sold from stalls surrounding the Basilica and the Plaza Miranda fronting it. Abortion is illegal in the Philippines, and individuals who cannot afford the surgical procedure resort to these vendors.

The media often covers stories of dead fetuses being abandoned outside of the church's Blessed Sacrament chapel, a practice condemned by the Archdiocese of Manila. Cardinal Gaudencio Rosales has issued several canonical excommunications for women who perform intentional abortion in relation to such practices near the shrine, as ruled by the Catholic Church.

== Coat of arms ==
Coat of arms of Quiapo Church
| Adopted June 15, 2023 Years in use 3 Helm The pontifical umbraculum (pavilion) paneled paly Gules and Or; the stem Or and surmounted by a globus cruciger Gules and Or. Escutcheon Vert, quartered by a cross Argent over a wooden cross proper with the IHS Christogram Gules on a sun rayonnant Or in fess point encircled by the crown of thorns Or, on sinister chief, a Marian monogram consisting of a cross Argent, the letter ‘M’ Or and a crescent moon Argent, on dexter base, a shofar bendwise Or. Supporters The keys of Saint Peter in saltire Argent and Or. Motto Krus ng ating kaligtasan (Filipino for 'Cross of our salvation') Symbolism: The central Christogram "IHS" within a sun in splendor stands for Iesous Hemeteros Soter (Jesus our Savior), representing Jesus Christ as the Black Nazarene.; The brown Latin cross signifies the Passion and crucifixion. Its brown color reflects both the wooden cross carried by the Nazarene and the dark skin of the image, which serves as a symbol of humility.; The gold crown of thorns surrounding the cross represents the sacrifice of Christ for the salvation of humanity.; These central elements are overlaid on a larger silver cross, which symbolizes both the Passion and the theological hope of the Resurrection.; The shofar (ram's horn) represents John the Baptist, the titular patron saint of the parish, signifying his scriptural role as the "voice of one crying in the wilderness" (John 1:23).; The Marian monogram "M" surmounted by a cross and resting on a crescent moon signifies the Blessed Virgin Mary. This references the historical bond between the devotions to the Black Nazarene and Our Lady of Antipolo, as well as the parish's local devotion to Nuestra Señora de la Buena Hora (Spanish for 'Our Lady of the Good Hour'). The crescent moon specifically denotes Mary under the title of the Immaculate Conception and symbolizes the bliss of heaven, aligning with the local devotion's celebration on the Solemnity of the Assumption. |

== Gallery ==
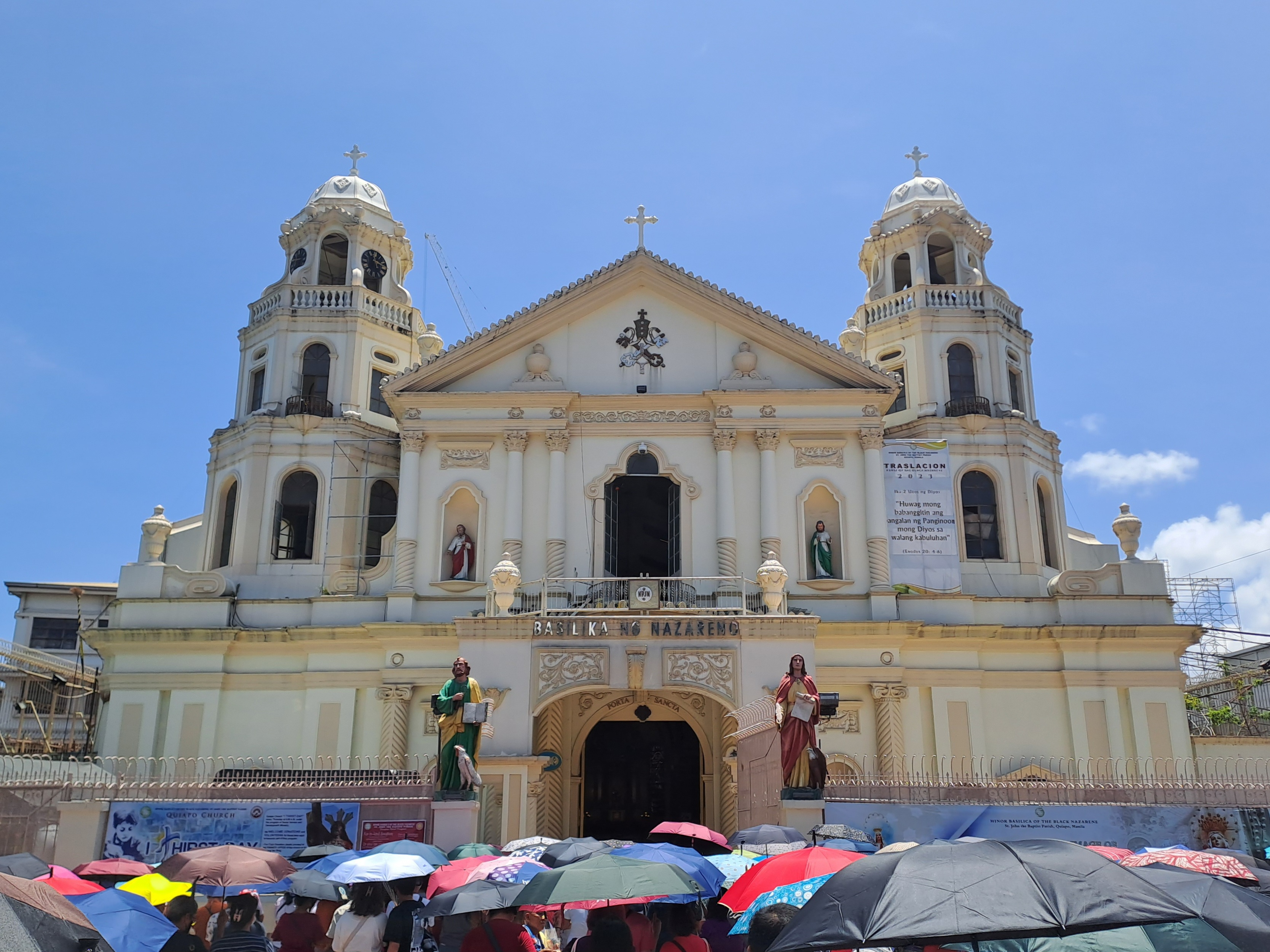
Close-up of the main façade

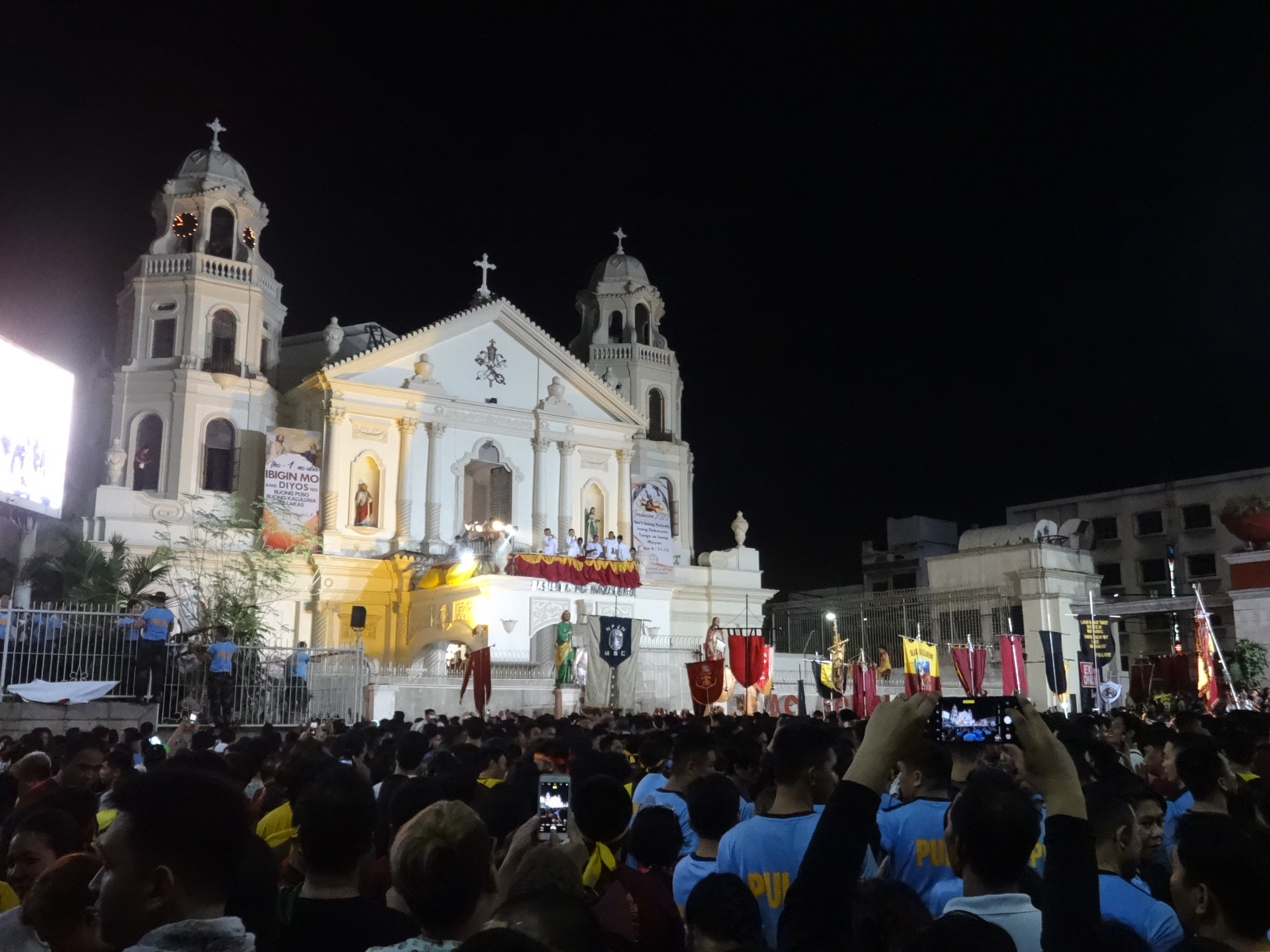
Main façade at night

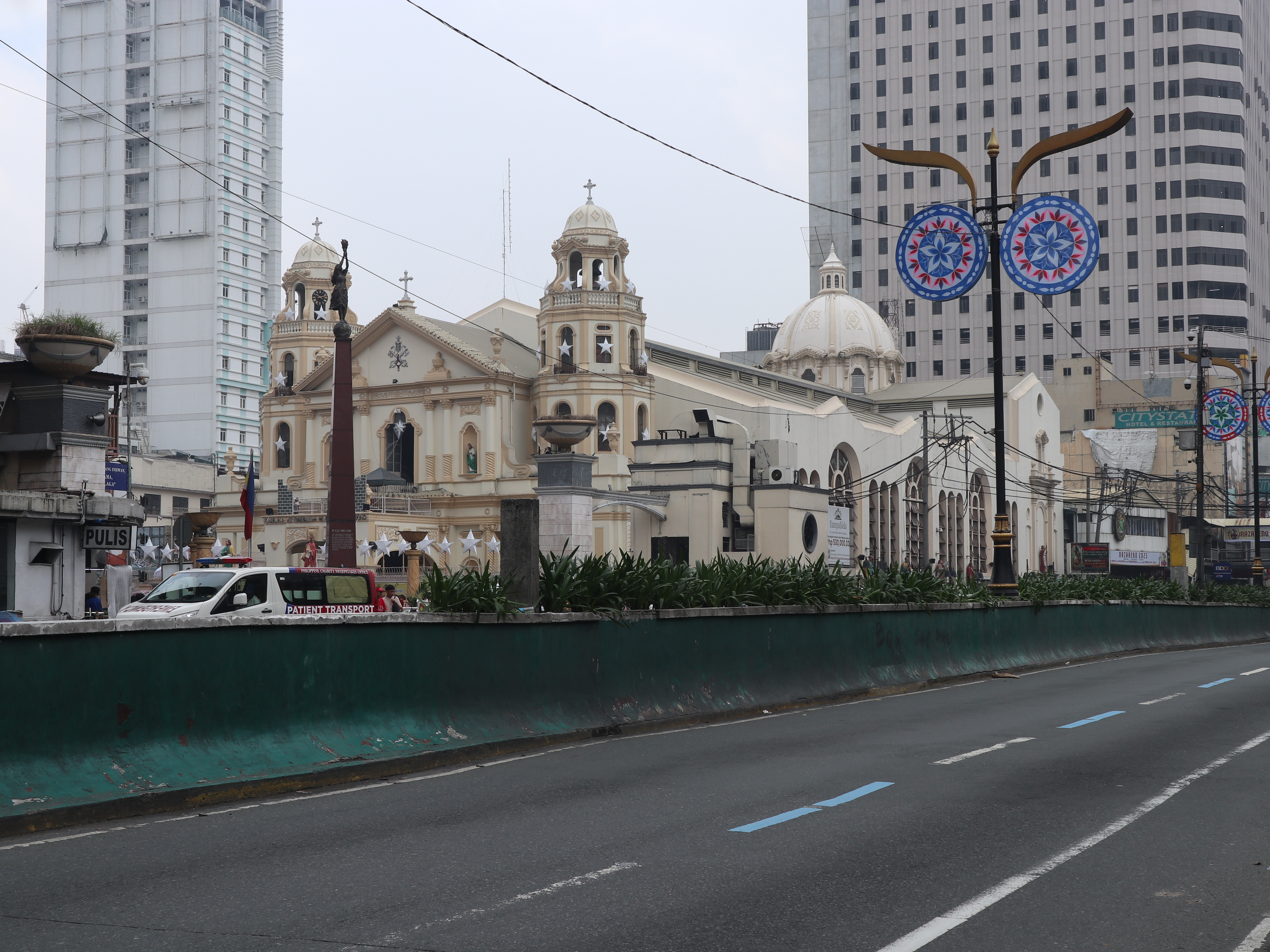
Side view of the facade

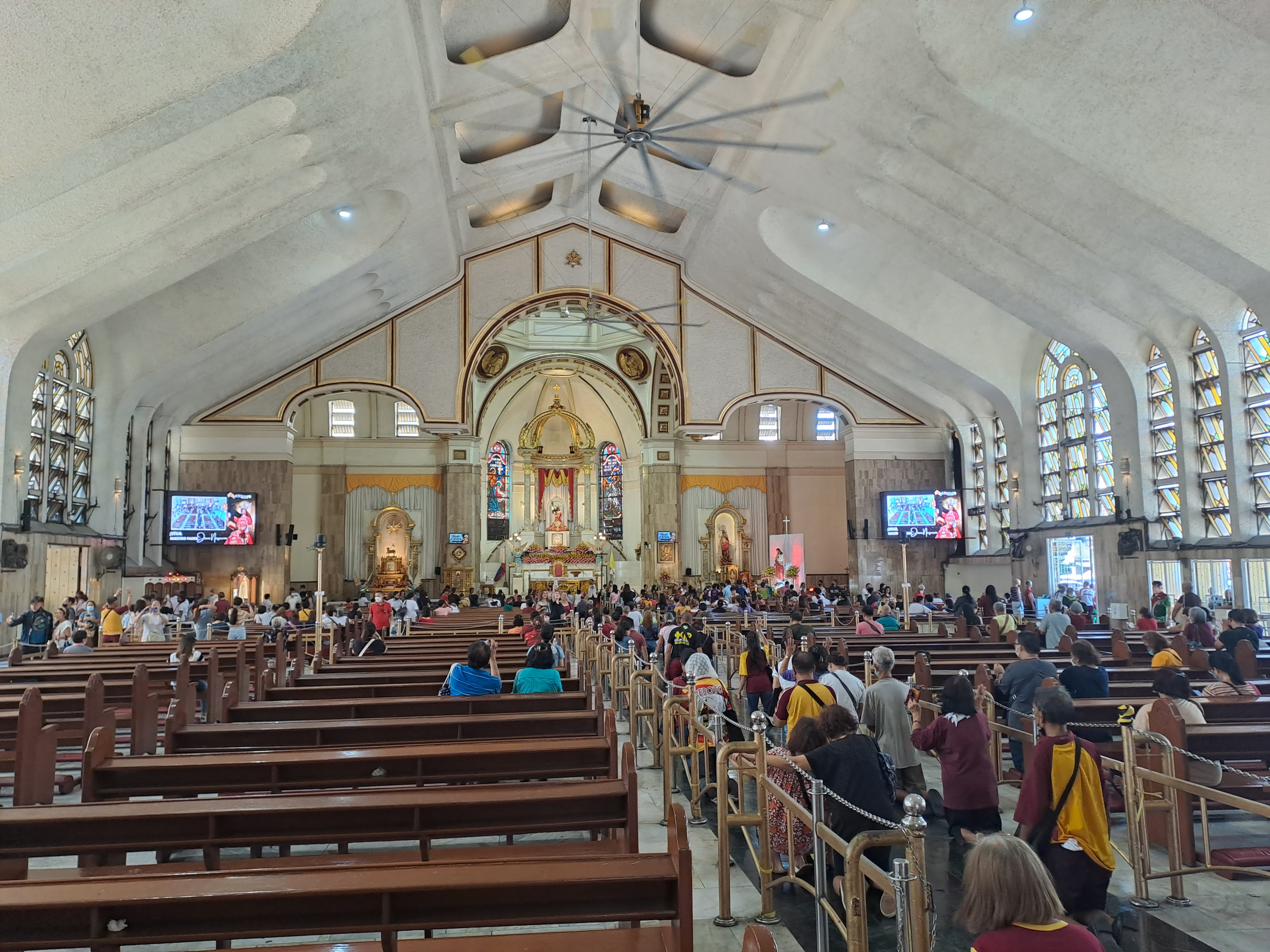
Church interior in 2023. Devotees in the central aisle are seen walking on their knees towards the sanctuary, offering prayers.

Lateral walls

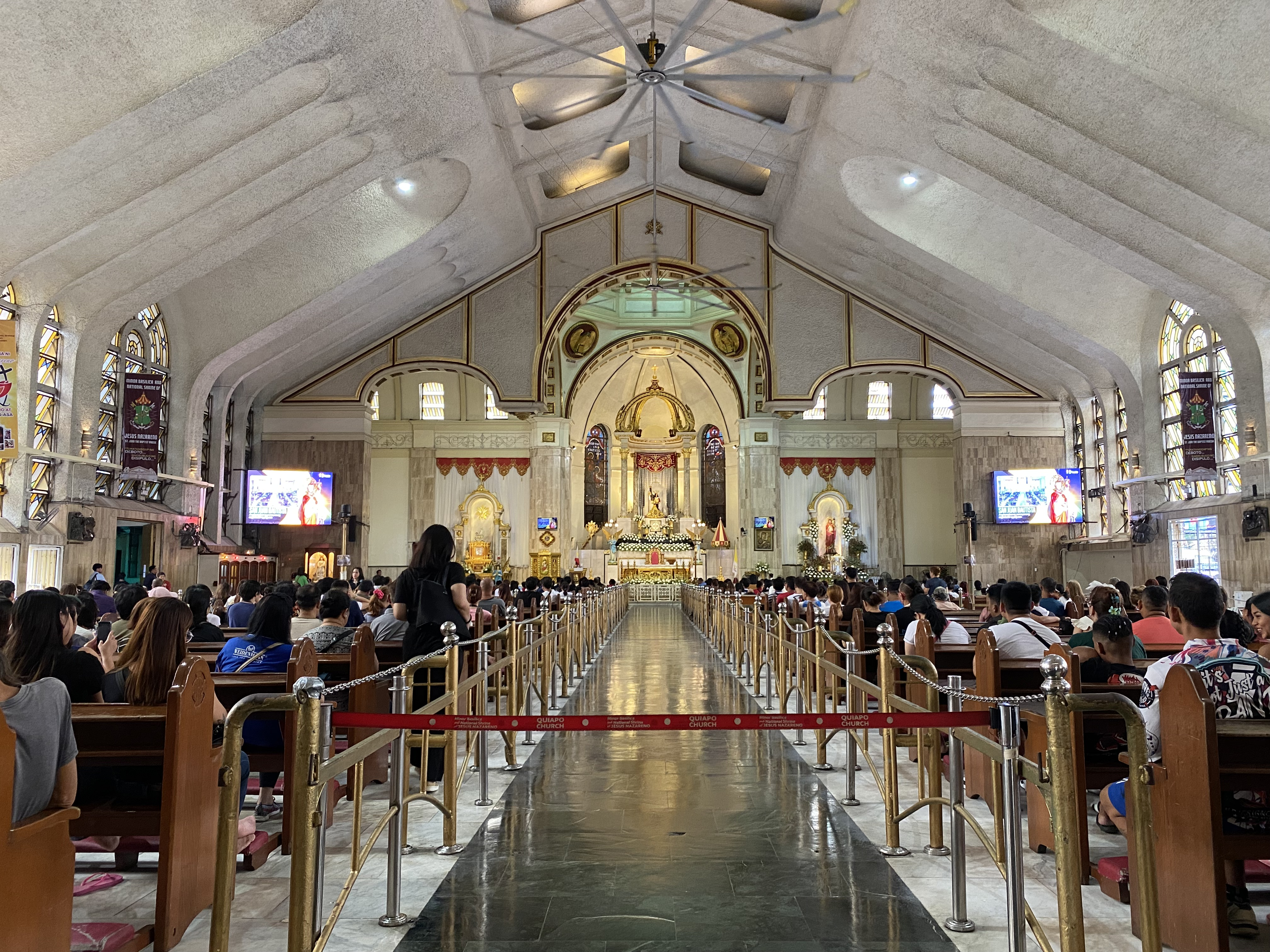
Central nave and altar in 2025

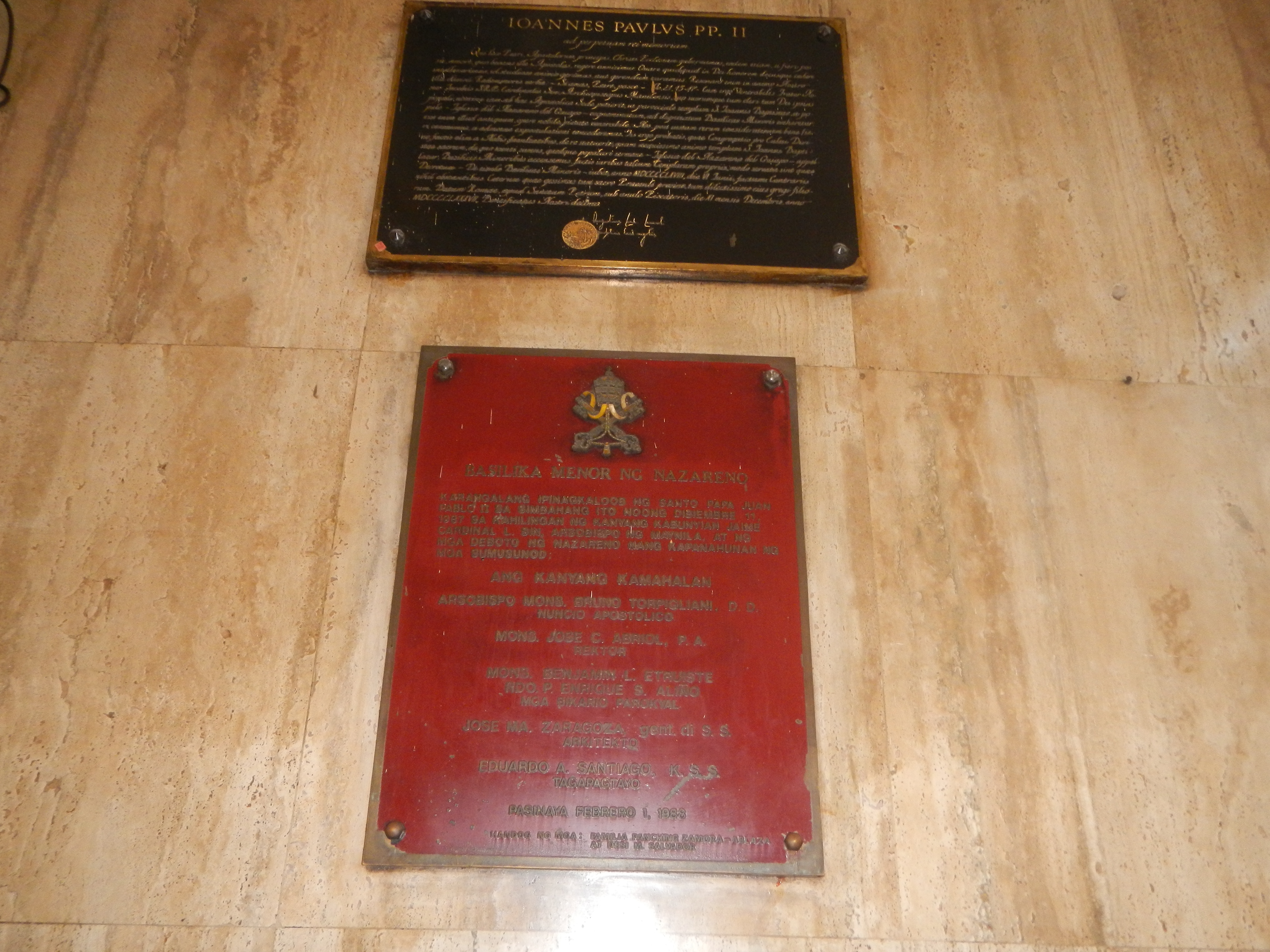
Historical plaques inside the church presenting the papal decree declaring the church as a basilica

== See also ==
- List of Catholic basilicas
