= Archdiocesan Shrine of Saint Joseph =

Roman Catholic church in Manila, Philippines

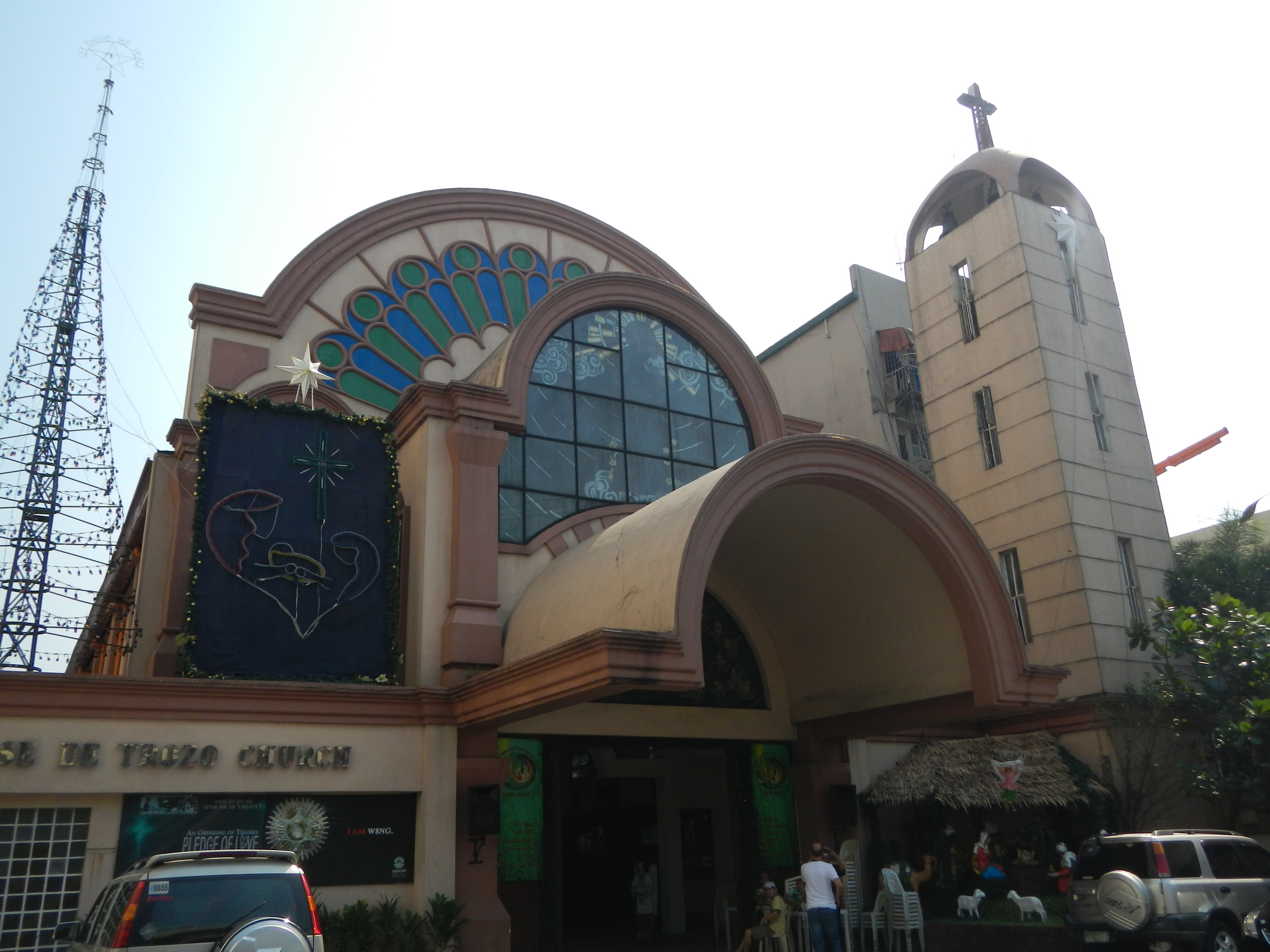
- Church facade in 2014
- Archdiocesan Shrine of Saint Joseph
- 14°36′31″N 120°58′46″E
- Location: Tondo, Manila
- Country: Philippines
- Denomination: Catholic
- Website: San Jose de Trozo Parish

History
- Former name: San Jose de Trozo Parish Church (Note: Parokya ng San Jose de Trozo (Filipino); Iglesia de San Jose de Trozo (Spanish))
- Status: Parish church
- Founded: 1933
- Founder: Antonio Albrecht

Architecture
- Functional status: Active
- Architectural type: Church building

Administration
- Archdiocese: Manila
- Deanery: San José de Trozo
- Parish: San José de Trozo

Clergy
- Vicar(s): Junerl A. Salugsugan; Christopher S. Crucero; Mark Francis B. Campit
- Priest(s): Peterson O. Tieng (and vicar forane)

The Archdiocesan Shrine of Saint Joseph, formerly known as San Jose de Trozo Parish Church, is a Roman Catholic church in Tondo, Manila in the Philippines. Founded in 1933, the church is under the jurisdiction of the Archdiocese of Manila. The parish church was elevated to an Archdiocesan Shrine on November 30, 2022. The current Rector & Parish Priest is Peterson O. Tieng.

== Vicariate of José de Trozo ==
The church is under the jurisdiction of the Archdiocese of Manila under the vicariate forane of San José de Trozo. Aside from the parish church, the vicariate covers the following churches:

- San Sebastian Church, Manila
- Quiapo Church
- Santa Cruz Church, Manila
- National Shrine of Saint Jude Thaddeus
- San Miguel Church, Manila

== Gallery ==
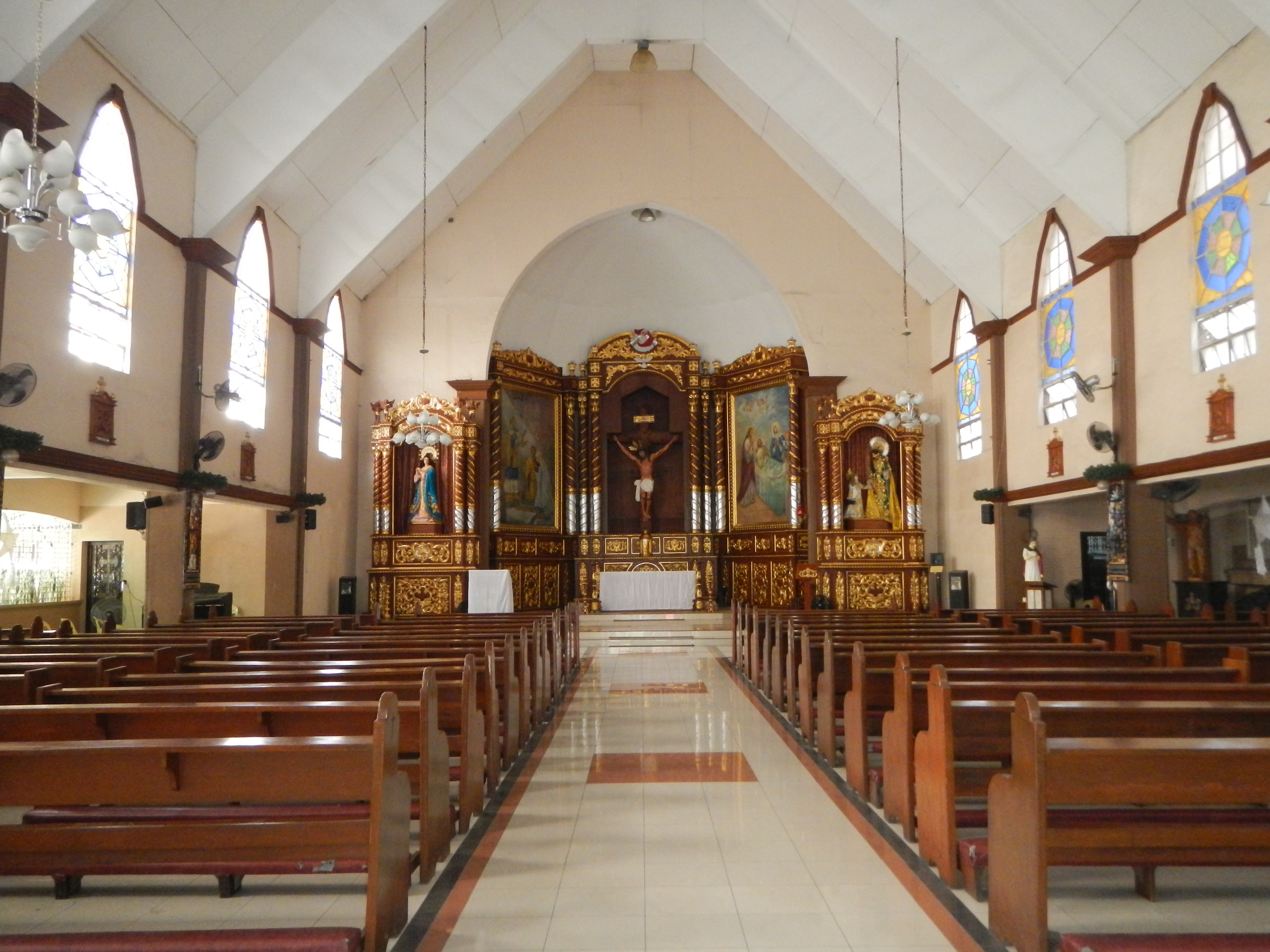
Church interior in 2014

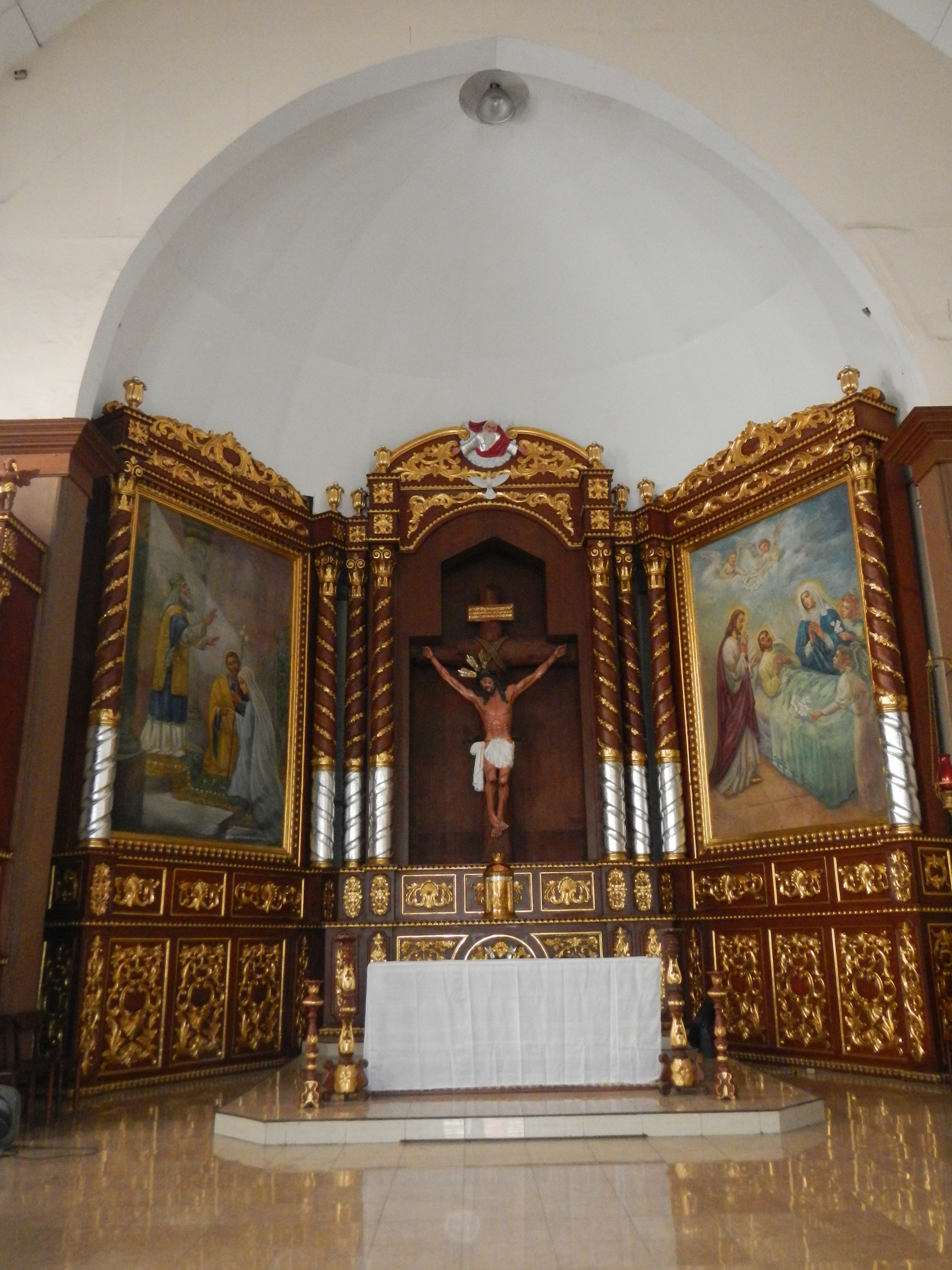
Church altar
