= National Shrine of Saint Jude (Philippines) =

Roman Catholic church in Manila, Philippines

National Shrine of Saint Jude Thaddeus
- Saint Jude Parish
- Pambansang Dambana ni San Judas Tadeo (Filipino); Santuario Nacional de San Judas Tadeo del Malacañan (Spanish); Sanctuarium Nationale atque Ecclesiae Paroecialis a Sancti Judae Thaddaei Apostoli in loco v.d. Malacañan (Latin)
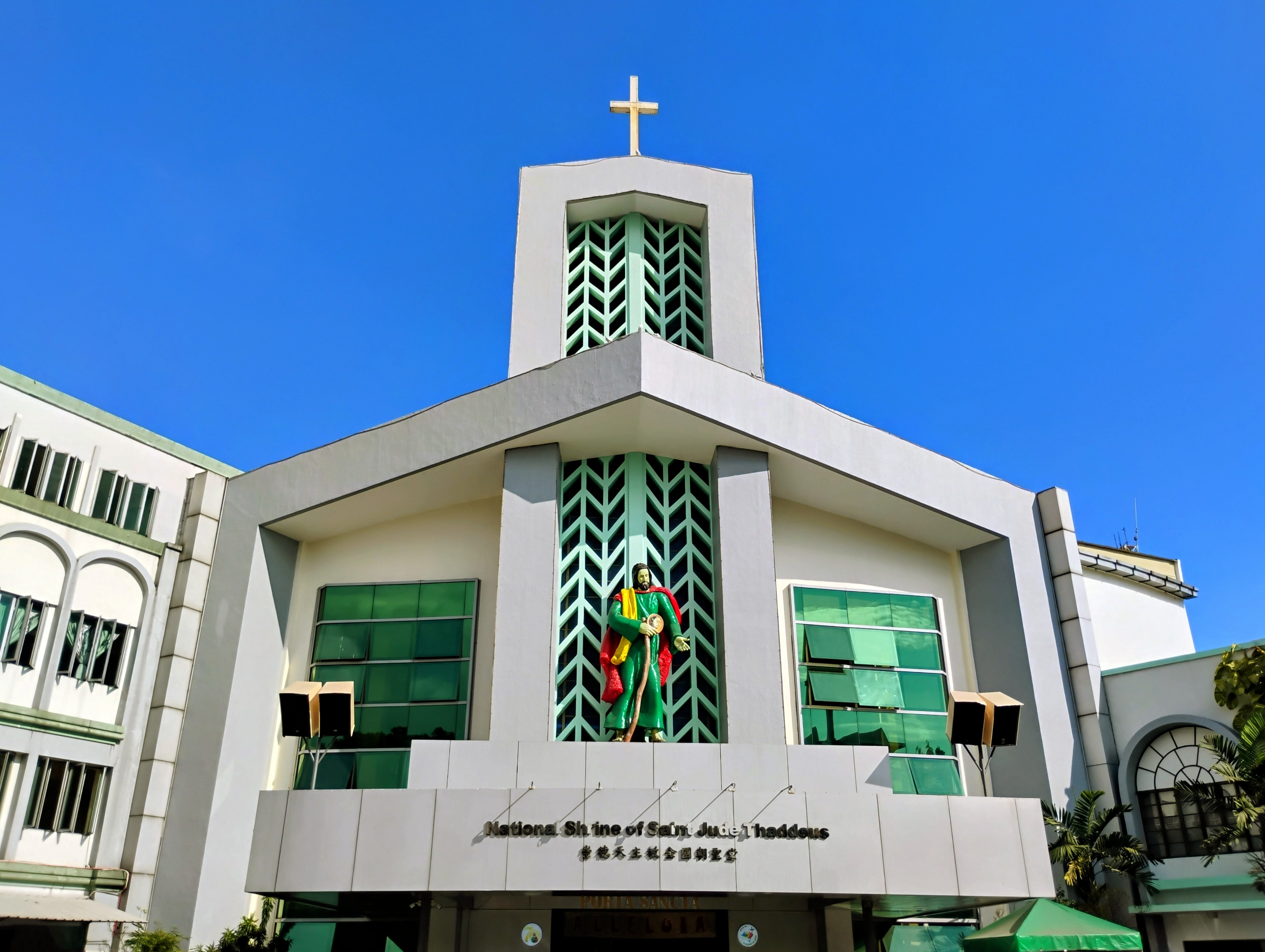
- The church in 2026
- National Shrine of Saint Jude Thaddeus
- 14°35′49″N 120°59′44″E
- Location: José P. Laurel Street, San Miguel, Manila
- Country: Philippines
- Denomination: Roman Catholic
- Religious institute: Society of the Divine Word
- Website: National Shrine of Saint Jude Thaddeus

History
- Former names: Espíritu Santo Chinese Parish; Archdiocesan Shrine of Saint Jude Thaddeus
- Status: Parish church, National Shrine
- Founded: October 13, 1954; 71 years ago
- Dedication: Jude the Apostle
- Consecrated: October 23, 1960; 65 years ago

Architecture
- Functional status: Active
- Architectural type: Church building
- Style: Modern
- Groundbreaking: September 28, 1958; 67 years ago
- Completed: October 23, 1960; 65 years ago

Administration
- Archdiocese: Manila
- Deanery: Jose de Trozo
- Parish: Saint Jude

Clergy
- Rector: Alex G. Vitualla, SVD
- Vicar(s): Peter Li Mei, SVD
- Priest(s): Glenn Paul Gomez, SVD; Bernhard Abrazado, SVD; Joey Ruega, SVD; Arlo Bernardo Yap, SVD

The National Shrine of Saint Jude Thaddeus or Saint Jude Parish, formerly known as Espíritu Santo Chinese Parish, is one of three Chinese parishes established by the Roman Catholic Archdiocese of Manila in Metro Manila, Philippines.

The shrine holds its novena service every Thursday to Saint Jude, whose traditional color is green. Its annual fiesta is held every October 28, the Feast of Saints Jude Thaddeus and Simon the Zealot. The shrine is popular with students and those reviewing for board examinations, as Jude Thaddeus is considered the patron saint of hopeless cases.

The shrine is located at J.P. Laurel Street, San Miguel, Manila which is inside the Malacañang Palace Complex. The current parish priest and shrine rector is Rev. Fr. Alex G. Vitualla, SVD. He is assisted by Rev. Fr. Peter Li Mei, SVD, Rev. Fr. Glorioso "Yoyo" Salvatierra, SVD, Rev. Fr. Emilio "Emil" Lim, SVD and Rev. Fr. Fernando "Nanding" Santos, SVD.

== History ==
=== Background ===
The Chinese presence in the Philippines goes back many centuries. During the Spanish colonization of the Philippines, the Dominicans built their dwelling places near the homes of the Sangleys (from the Hokkien 生意 sengli, "business" or "trade"). Evangelization of the Chinese started in 1588 but Chinese revolts during the 18th century resulted in the placing of the Chinese ministry under the secular clergy, which led to the attachment of the Chinese parish to Binondo Parish until 1954.

As the Chinese community swelled during those periods, Binondo Church, the only Chinese parish in Manila at the time, was considered insufficient. Thus, the faculty to erect three more Chinese parishes was obtained by Archbishop Rufino Santos from the Roman Consistorial Congregation on July 23, 1954. Those three parishes were to be located in the Paco district of Manila, Pasay and northeastern Metro Manila or Quezon City.

=== Establishment ===
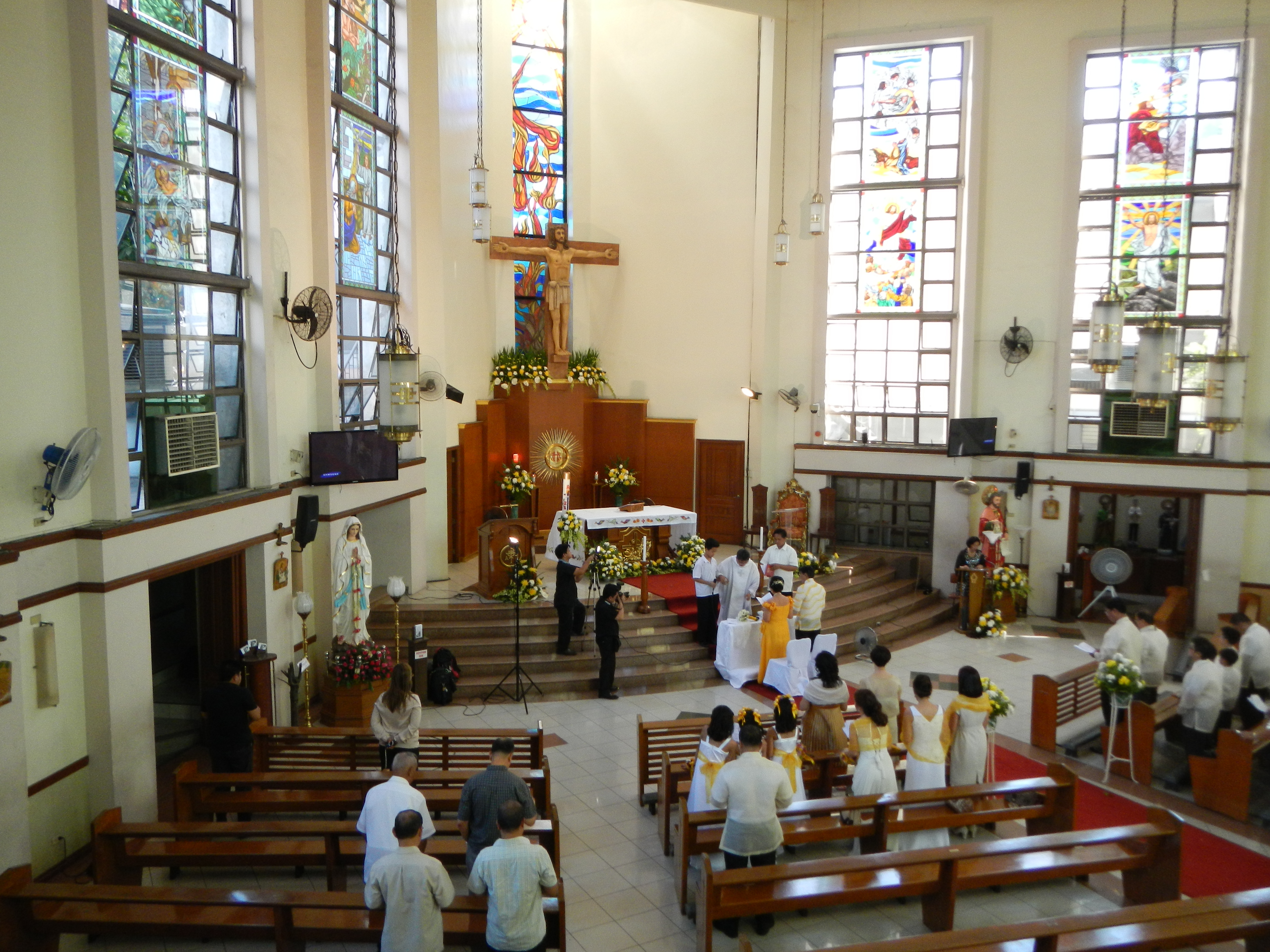
Church interior in 2013

After receiving the commission for the churches, Espíritu Santo Chinese Parish in the Santa Cruz district was canonically erected. On October 13, 1954, Hermann Kondring appointed Henry Windges as the first parish priest. He was installed by Santos on November 14, 1954. Peter Tsao was subsequently appointed assistant parish priest on December 7, 1954. The first rectory was in a portion of Riverside Hospital (now the Saint Jude Catholic School) which was rented for that purpose in January 1955. Jude Thaddeus was made patron saint of the parish after a month by Santos as proposed by Hermann Kondring.

The present site of St. Jude Parish, with an area of 2,989.10 square metres (32,174.4 sq ft), was donated by Santos. The blessing and laying of the church's cornerstone was held there on September 28, 1958. It was then consecrated on October 23, 1960, with then-First Lady Leonila Dimataga-García, who performed the ribbon cutting ceremony. At the time, the church had no windows. The St. Jude Annex was completed and blessed by Buenaventura López on February 27, 1968.

The first organization established by Henry Windges in 1955 was the Praesidium Marias Spes Sinensium of the Legion of Mary. With the setting up of the parish council, other organizations followed: Filipino-Chinese Catholic Youth, Altar Servers, Catholic Women's League, St. Jude Foundation, Kerygma Lectors, Ichtys Choir, Mother Butler's Guild, St. Jude Ladies' Association, Pax Et Bonum Choir, Special Ministers for the Holy Communion, Couples for Christ, the Greeters and Collectors Ministry, and the Friends of St. Jude.

When Windges returned to Germany, Tsao was appointed quasi-parish priest on March 29, 1957, and officially installed as parish priest on March 1, 1958, by Jesús Tison. Bernard Doyle was appointed assistant parish priest on May 20, 1957, while Peter Yang was designated parochial vicar on May 7, 1959, both appointed by Cardinal Rufino J. Santos.

On March 12, 1966, Santos installed Peter Tsao as Vicar General for the Chinese in Manila.

Sometime in 1968, Charles Tchou was appointed assistant parish priest. Upon completion, Buenaventura Lopez blessed the St. Jude Annex Building on February 27, 1968. The parish hall was blessed by Cardinal Jaime Sin on November 13, 1983.

While remaining a personal parish for the Chinese and Chinese Filipinos, St. Jude Parish became also a territorial parish on June 20, 1986, and took overseas adjacent to the parish church composed of four barangays that were formerly under the jurisdiction of San Miguel Parish.

On October 25, 1986, Sin appointed Thomas Cassidy as assistant parish priest.

From April 1995 to April 1999, Teodoro P. Gapuz was acting parish priest with Joseph Vu as parochial vicar.

In May 1999, Teodor P. Gapuz was appointed Director of St. Jude Catholic School, and John O'Mahony took over as acting parish priest of St. Jude Archdiocesan Shrine with the following parochial vicars: Isabelo San Luis, Rodgrigo Advincula, and Leopoldo C. Jaucian, with Roland Aquino as the deacon who assisted on weekends.

Leopoldo C. Jaucian succeeded Peter Tsao and was appointed parish priest at St. Jude Archdiocesan Shrine on July 25, 2000, and installed by Cardinal Sin on August 19, 2000.

On July 27, 2001, Ricardo C. Miranda and Joseph Xin Lu were appointed parochial vicar and attached priest respectively.

In 2005, Roland Aquino was installed as the parish priest of the shrine.

=== Elevation to national shrine and 21st century ===
St. Jude Parish was later renamed the "Archdiocesan Shrine of Saint Jude Thaddeus" on June 21, 1994, following a petition by Peter Tsao and the parishioners, and as a result of the increasing number of devotees that visit the shrine on Thursdays for the weekly novena service.

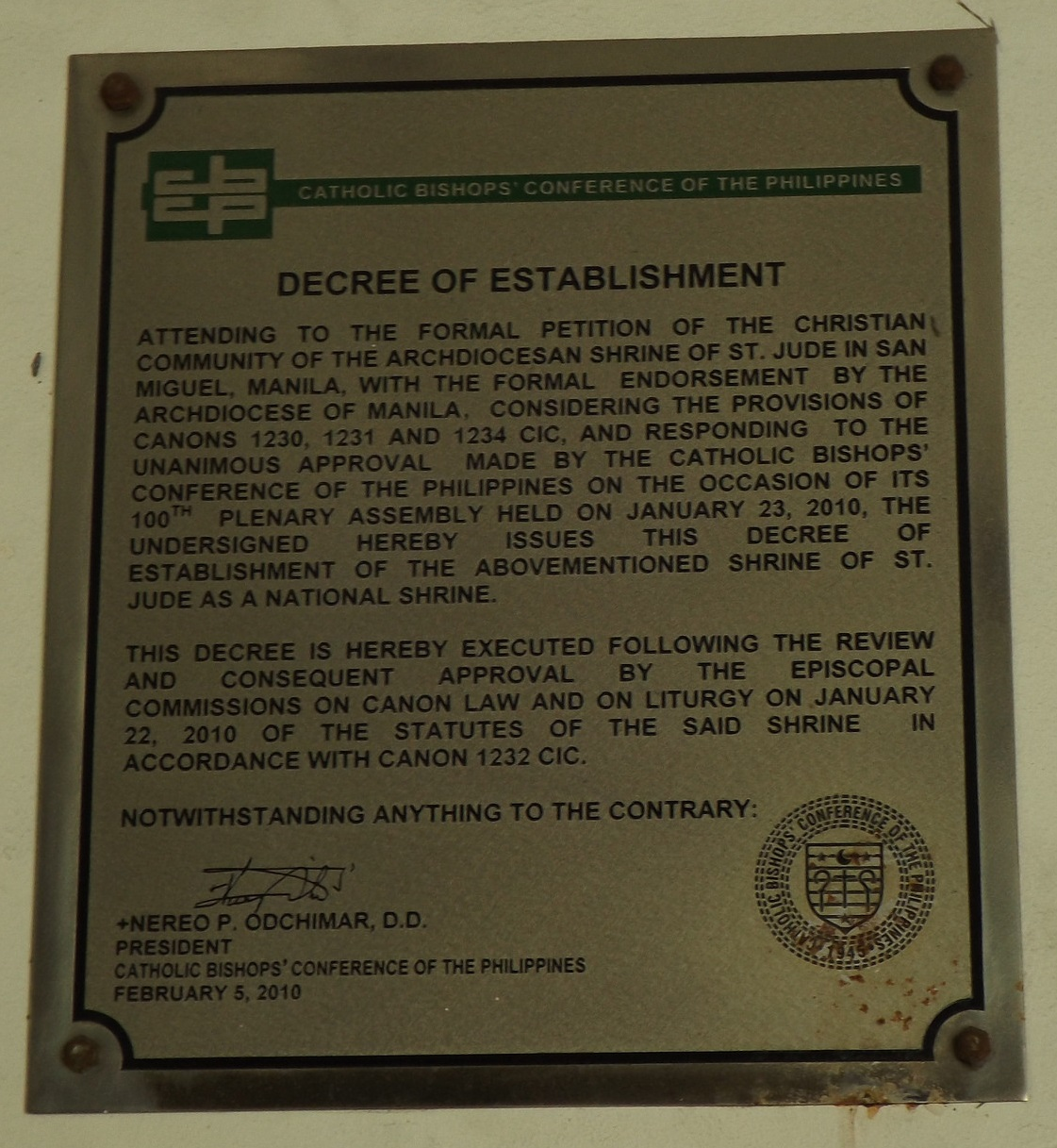
Text of the ecclesiastical decree establishing the church as a National Shrine

During the term of Roland Aquino as parish priest and shrine rector, in February 2010, the shrine was elevated as national shrine through a decree of establishment issued by the CBCP President and Tandag Bishop Nereo Odchimar. The elevation of the status of the Archdiocesan Shrine of St. Jude Thaddeus into national shrine was unanimously approved by the Catholic Bishops Conference of the Philippines (CBCP) during its 100th plenary assembly on January 23.

Manila Archbishop Cardinal Gaudencio Rosales endorsed the petition to the CBCP giving assurance "that all canonical and liturgical requirements for the elevation to the status of being a National Shrine have been complied with".

On the year 2014, during the last year of Aquino as parish priest and shrine rector, the shrine celebrated its 60th anniversary. The celebrations and activities for the shrine's 60th anniversary was launched on February 2, 2014, by Cardinal Luis Antonio G. Tagle, Archbishop of Manila. The anniversary culminated on October 28, 2014, the feast day of St. Jude Thaddeus, with Tagle blessing the shrine's new bell tower and presiding the Feast Day Pontifical High Mass together with almost 75 priest concelebrants.

In February 2015, Linus Nicasio, from the Sacred Heart of Jesus Parish in Kamuning, Quezon City and who previously served as the principal of St. Jude Catholic School, was installed by Broderick Pabillo, Auxiliary Bishop of Manila, as the parish priest and shrine rector.

=== Thursday novena ===
The weekly novena to St. Jude began in June 1959 and has been held every Thursday since then. The devotion spread over the years and has become very popular in Metro Manila, with devotees including students, board examination reviewees, office workers, parishioners, and all walks of life.

Thursday is always a busy day, with preaching, confessions, and counselling forming an important part of the work. Masses and novenas are scheduled hourly throughout the day from early morning until evening. Huge crowds overflow the church into the church grounds every Thursday. As a result of this, the church was conferred the title of Archdiocesan Shrine of St. Jude on June 21, 1994.

== Papal visits ==
Modern popes have made it a point to make the long journey to Catholic Philippines, with the country hosting four popes in a span of 45 years.

In 1970, Pope Paul VI came as a missionary pope and visited the slums of Tondo, Manila. A decade later, Pope John Paul II came to raise the Philippines' protomartyr, Lorenzo Ruiz, to beatify him and his companion martyrs.

John Paul II returned in 1995 for the 1995 World Youth Day in Manila. Prior to 2015, the concluding Mass of his visit was the largest human gathering in history. For Filipinos, papal visits have been a source of joy, strength, and most importantly, hope. Pope Francis visited in 2015, and his concluding Mass broke the 1995 record.

As absolute monarch of Vatican City State, Popes are formally received by the President of Philippines to Malacañan Palace, the President’s official residence and principal workplace. The Shrine is located inside the Palace Complex, so visiting Popes en route to the Palace often pass by it.

== Parish priests and other assigned priests ==
Since its establishment, the shrine is under the pastoral care of the Society of the Divine Word (SVD).

The following is a list of the priests who were assigned in the shrine since 1954:

1. Henry Windges (as Espiritu Santo Chinese Parish) – 1954
  - Assistant parish priest: Peter Tsao
2. Peter Tsao – 1957 (appointed) /1958 (installed)
  - Assistant parish priests: Bernard Doyle / Charles Tchou / Thomas Cassidy
  - Parochial vicar: Peter Yang
3. Teodoro P. Gapuz – 1995 (acting parish priest)
  - Parochial vicar: Joseph Vu, S.V.D.
4. John O'Mahony – 1999 (acting parish priest)
  - Parochial vicars: Isabelo San Luis / Rodrigo Advincula / Leopoldo C. Jaucian
5. Leopoldo C. Jaucian – 2000 – 2005
  - Parochial vicar: Ricardo C. Miranda
  - Attached priest: Joseph Xin Lu
6. Roland U. Aquino, S.V.D. – 2005 – 2015
  - Assistant parish priests: Antonio Enacmal / Ramon Bosch
  - Parochial vicar: Joseph Xin Lu
  - Attached priests: Peter Mei Li / Flaviano Villanueva / Christopher Ramirez / Yuhang Antonio Wang
7. Marcelino "Linus" E. Nicasio, S.V.D. – 2015-2022
  - Assistant parish priest: Christopher Ramirez
  - Parochial vicar: Yuhang Antonio Wang
  - Attached priests: Antonio Enacmal (retired)
8. Alex G. Vitualla, S.V.D. – 2022 - 2026
  - Assistant parish priest: Peter Mei Li
  - Parochial vicar: Glorioso Salvatierra
  - Attached priests: Emilio Lim / Fernando Santos
9. Alex G. Vitualla, S.V.D. – 2026 - present
  - Assistant parish priest: Peter Mei Li
  - Parochial vicar: Glenn Paul Gomez
  - Attached priests: Bernhard Abrazado / Joey Ruega / Arlo Bernardo Yap

== Jubilee hymn ==
There are several songs and hymns used in the Shrine during the Thursday novena service that can be readily found in the official novena booklet.

The one below, which is not included in the booklet, was composed for the Shrine's 60th Anniversary and since then, is often sung after Mass or novena service as the recessional.

With joyful hearts we sing this song to you
Our Dear Saint Jude Thaddeus, our patron saint,
By your help and intercession, God has heard our cries and pleas
We are grateful that we have you, Saint Jude, we are one in you
We are grateful that we have you, Saint Jude, we are one in you
