= Padre Pio Shrine =

Roman Catholic church in Batangas, Philippines

- Parish and International Shrine of Saint Padre Pio
- Pandaigdigang Dambana at Parokya ni Santo Padre Pio (Filipino)
- The main church in April 2023

- Location in Luzon Location in the Philippines
- 14°04′35″N 121°10′36″E
- Location: Barangay San Pedro, Santo Tomas, Batangas
- Country: Philippines
- Denomination: Roman Catholic

History
- Status: International Shrine
- Founded: June 28, 2003; 23 years ago
- Founder: Gaudencio Rosales
- Dedication: Padre Pio
- Dedicated: September 23, 2013; 13 years ago

Architecture
- Functional status: Active
- Architect: Julius Pio Raña
- Architectural type: Church building
- Style: Vernacular
- Groundbreaking: 2006; 20 years ago
- Completed: September 23, 2013; 13 years ago

Specifications
- Materials: Wood, stone, bamboo, sasa (nipa leaves) and sawali (woven bamboo strips)

Administration
- Archdiocese: Lipa
- Deanery: Most Holy Rosary
- Parish: Padre Pio

Clergy
- Rector: Oscar L. Andal

The Parish and International Shrine of Saint Padre Pio, commonly known as Padre Pio Shrine, is a Roman Catholic parish church and pilgrimage site situated along Governor Antonio Carpio Avenue (Santo Tomas–Lipa Road) in Barangay San Pedro, Santo Tomas, Batangas, Philippines. It is consecrated to the Italian Saint Pio of Pietrelcina.

Administered by the Roman Catholic Archdiocese of Lipa, the church was designated a national shrine by the Catholic Bishops' Conference of the Philippines, making it the first in the province of Batangas. It became one of the venues for the 4th World Apostolic Congress of Mercy held in the Philippines on January 16–20, 2017.

It has been elevated to an International Shrine by the Holy See, becoming the second international shrine in the Philippines after the International Shrine of Our Lady of Peace and Good Voyage in Antipolo. The decree was issued by the Dicastery for Evangelization on May 25, 2026, coinciding with the 139th birth anniversary of Saint Padre Pio. The solemn declaration took place on September 23, 2026, the feast day of the titular of the shrine.

== History ==
Padre Pio Shrine began as a small chapel along Maharlika Highway in Barangay San Pedro. The 10 barangays comprising the proposed parish were under the pastoral care of the St. Thomas Aquinas Parish in the poblacion of Santo Tomas, Batangas. Months after the canonization of Padre Pio in 2002, the first of his first-class relics was entrusted to the proposed parish by Fr. Cesar Acuin, O.F.M. Cap.

On June 28, 2003, the Parish of St. Padre Pio of Pietrelcina was canonically erected by Lipa Archbishop Gaudencio Rosales. It is the first parish in the Philippines under the patronage of the Capuchin saint. Dale Anthony Q. Barretto-Ko was installed as its first pastor.

Due to the growing number of devotees and parishioners from nearby barangays and towns that the chapel could not accommodate, a 1.6-hectare (4.0-acre) agricultural land also in Barangay San Pedro almost a kilometer away from Maharlika Highway was donated to the Archdiocese of Lipa by a generous couple, Ernesto and Adelaida Gonzaga, where a new and larger church would be built. Dr. Isabel Malvar-Villegas donated a 200-meter (660 ft) parcel of land that would be used as a right of way from the barangay road leading to the site. Groundbreaking ceremonies took place in 2006 and a temporary chapel of nipa leaves and bamboo was built at the new site.

On December 23, 2008, Lipa Archbishop Ramon Arguelles elevated the parish church as the Archdiocesan Shrine of St. Padre Pio. A year later, Joselin C. Gonda has been appointed to take over the administration of the parish and the construction of the church at the new site.

While the construction of the main church was ongoing, the shrine was named as one of the pilgrimage churches for the Centennial Jubilee of the establishment of the See of Lipa. Other designated pilgrimage churches were San Sebastian Cathedral, Carmelite Monastery, Redemptorist Church and the Archdiocesan Shrine of San Vicente Ferrer in Lipa City, Minor Basilica of the Immaculate Conception and the Most Holy Trinity Parish in Batangas City, and Basilica of St. Martin of Tours and the Archdiocesan Shrine of Our Lady of Caysasay in Taal.

On September 23, 2013, the feast day of Saint Padre Pio of Pietrelcina, the main parish church was dedicated to God by Cardinal Gaudencio Rosales. Present at the dedication was Ermelindo di Capua, the only surviving Italian Capuchin priest who worked closely with and took care of Padre Pio for three years before Pio's death. Capua (d. February 22, 2017) also entrusted two first-class relics of Padre Pio to the national shrine in 2010.

The Catholic Bishops' Conference of the Philippines (CBCP), on their semi-annual plenary assembly in 2015, unanimously approved the elevation of the Archdiocesan Shrine of St. Padre Pio into a national shrine. On September 14, 2015, marking the first day of novena to Saint Padre Pio, the president of the CBCP and Lingayen-Dagupan archbishop, Socrates Villegas, led the solemn declaration of the national shrine.

On January 18, 2017, the 4th World Apostolic Congress on Mercy in the Philippines, attended by thousands of participants and pilgrims from all over the country and other parts of the world, had its third day at the national shrine. This Divine Mercy Sanctuary for Pilgrims, where the day's activities were held, had been solemnly dedicated on December 23, 2016.

The Dicastery for Evangelization decreed the elevation of the Padre Pio Church to an International Shrine, the second in the Philippines after the Antipolo Cathedral, on May 25, 2026. The solemn declaration took place on September 23, 2026, during the Feast Day of Saint Padre Pio, and was attended by between 7,000-8,000 people.

== Architecture ==
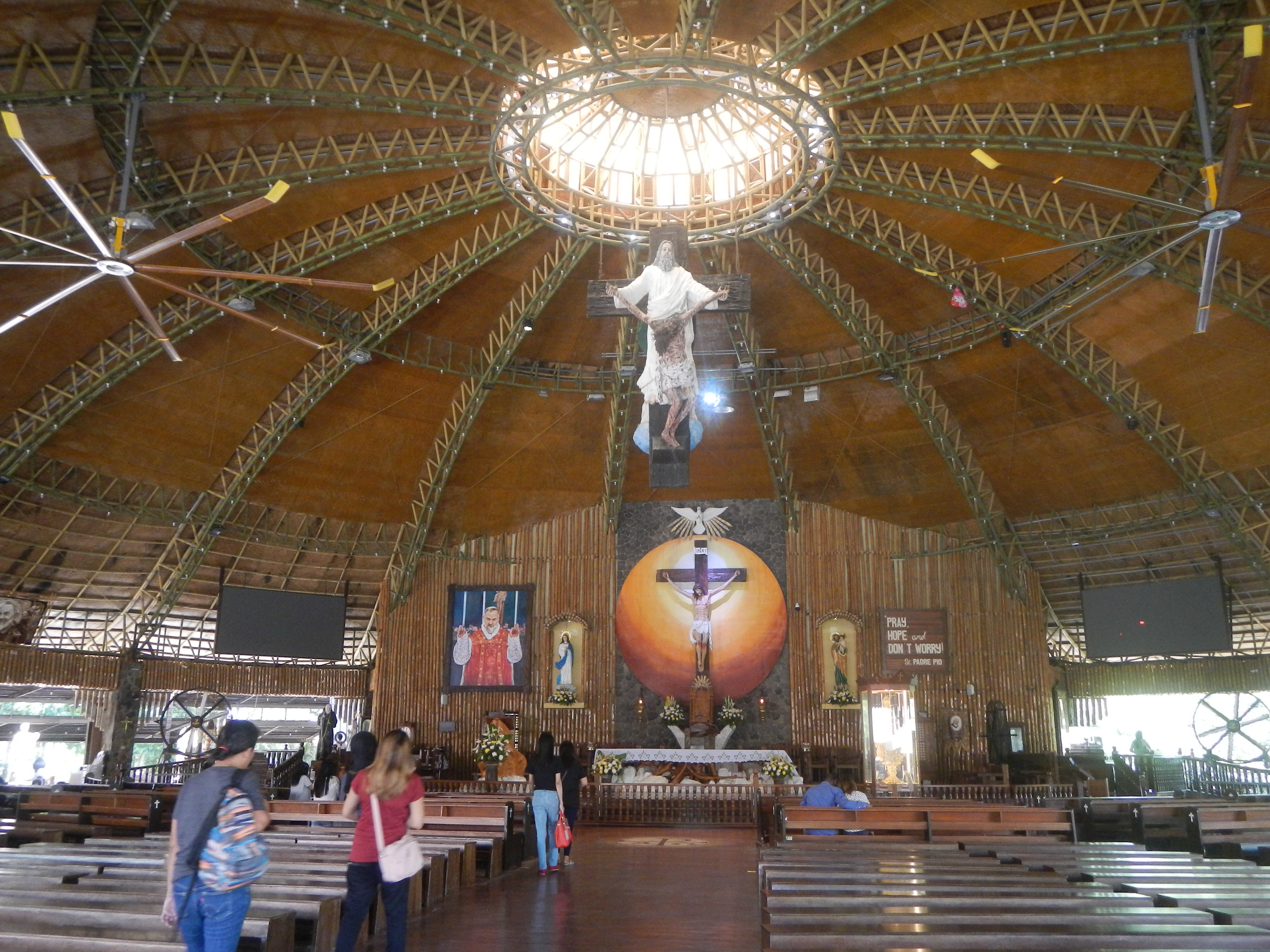
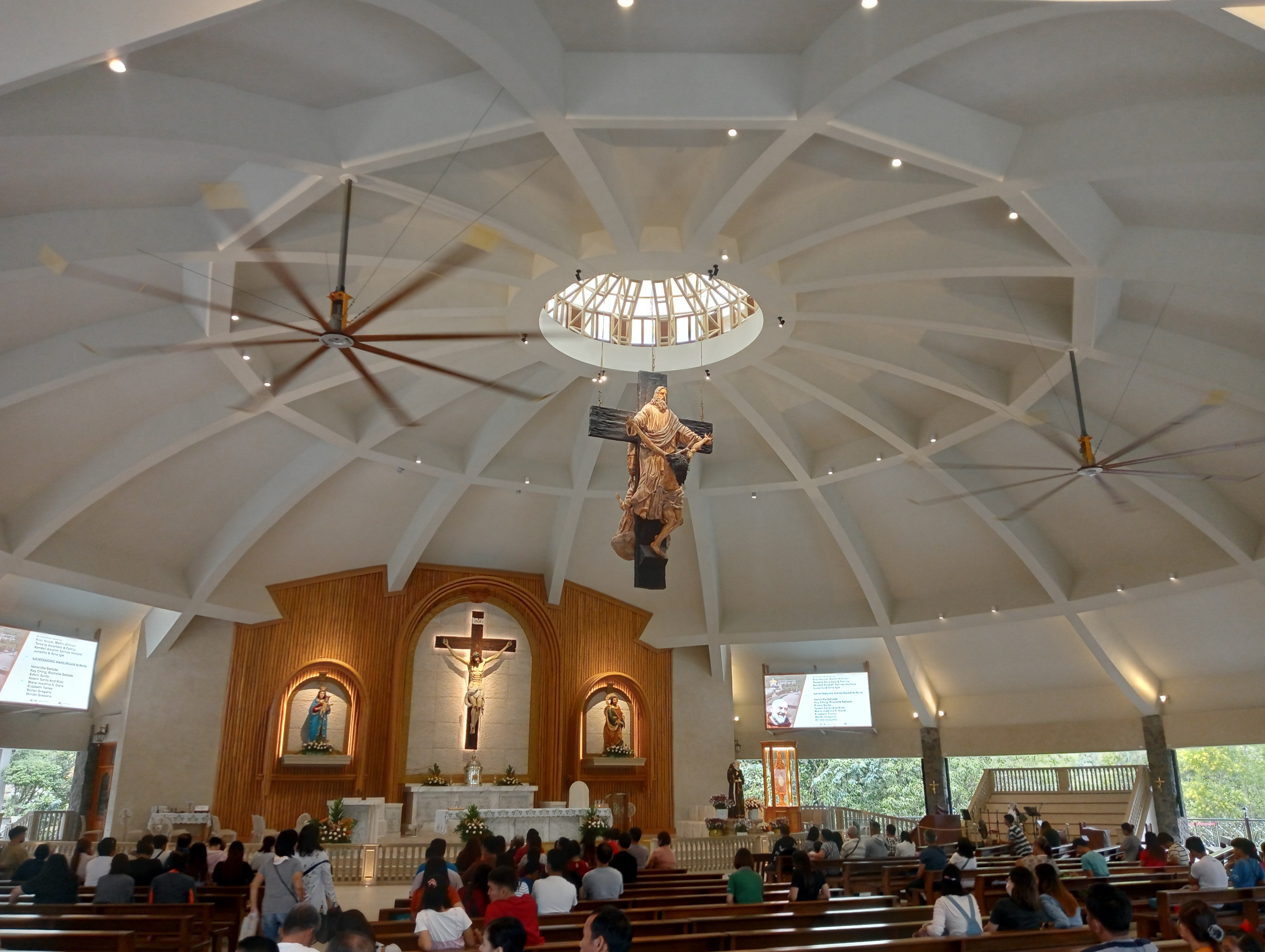
Church interior before (top) and after the 2022 renovation

The structure of the main church is made mostly of indigenous materials such as wood, stone, bamboo, sasa or nipa leaves and sawali or woven bamboo strips. The shape of its roof resembles a salakot, a traditional Filipino hat used by farmers and fishermen in their respective agricultural activities as their protection against the heat and rain. At the top of the roof stands the image of Our Lady of Mercy. The structure is open so that the pilgrims can enter and exit freely.

Inside the main church hangs a huge replica of the Glorious Cross derived from the design used for the Archdiocese of Lipa during the Jubilee Year 2000. The cross at the crucifix, the bottom of the altar table and the lectern are made of drift wood to adapt to the design of the main church. At the back is the Blessed Sacrament Chapel and its underneath is the Baptistery.

The rector and parish priest Joselin C. Gonda envisioned this concept for the main church, as to have a place of worship and prayer that is distinctly Filipiniana, eco-friendly and adapted to the tropical climate of the site surrounded by a green environment.

Similar designs aside from the main church can also be seen in the Mary Mother of Mercy Belfry, the St. John Mary Vianney Chapel of Reconciliation, the Sanctuary of the True Cross of Christ, and the Holy Water Sanctuary.

Other structures built within the national shrine include the parish rectory, office and religious store, the Fountain of Hope, the Stations of the Cross, and the Divine Mercy Sanctuary for Pilgrims which is used for other masses outside the main shrine.

== Devotion to Saint Padre Pio ==
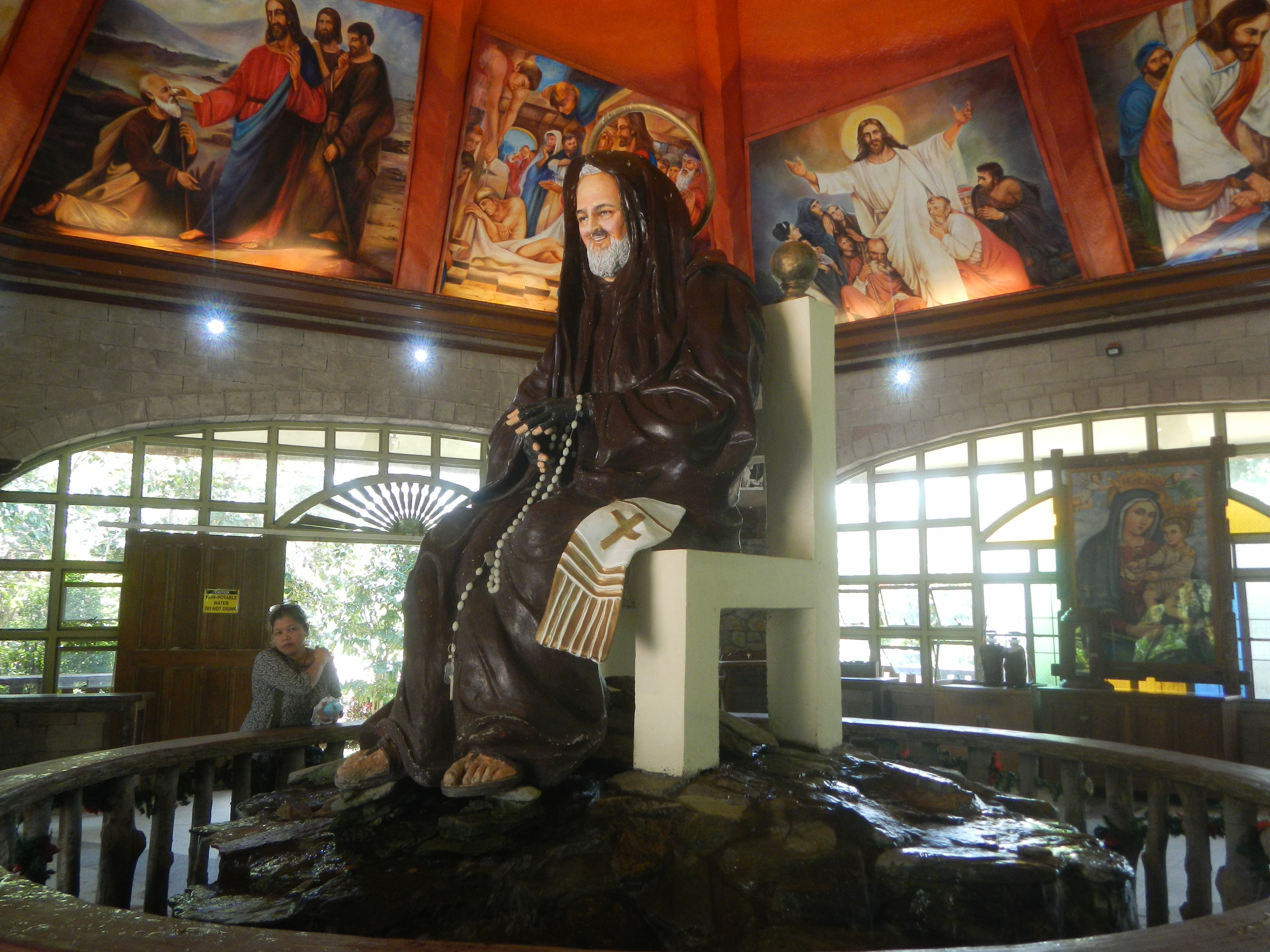
An image of Padre Pio at the Holy Water Sanctuary

Aside from the regular Sunday and daily Masses, devotees and parishioners flock to the International shrine for a special day of prayer to Saint Padre Pio every 23rd of the month except in the month of May when it is held on Pio's birthday, May 25. Additional special days of prayer are held every Saturdays of the month.

Healing liturgy follows after Mass at 9:00 in the morning and 5:00 in the afternoon. After reading the Gospel followed by a brief homily, prayer for healing of the sick comes when first- and second-class relics of Padre Pio are exposed to be venerated by the pilgrims. Then there is an anointing with oil of the sick by the priests and religious present.

Flowers are offered at the image of Padre Pio before the end of the Mass. One can either offer white or red roses or both. It is said that a woman named Vittoria had a vision of luminous rays formed by thousands of white and red roses that radiated out from Padre Pio and spread in every direction. She sought an explanation from Pio, and he told the woman that the white roses in her vision represent the souls who attempt to live in grace, in love of God and in fraternal charity, while the red roses represent those who carry the cross of suffering with joy, and united with Jesus collaborate in the conversion of sinners and in the salvation of others.

Novena booklets, images and other religious items are available at the shrine’s store separated from the main church.

== Gallery ==
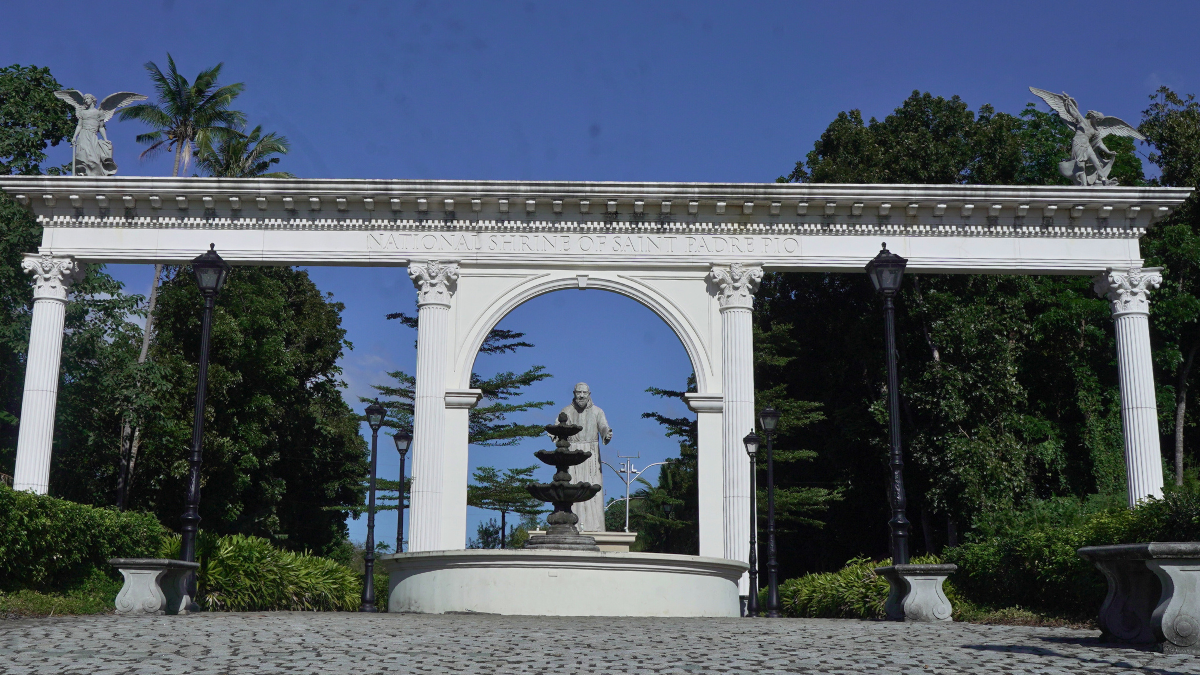
Main Arc Entrance of Parish and International Shrine of Saint Padre Pio

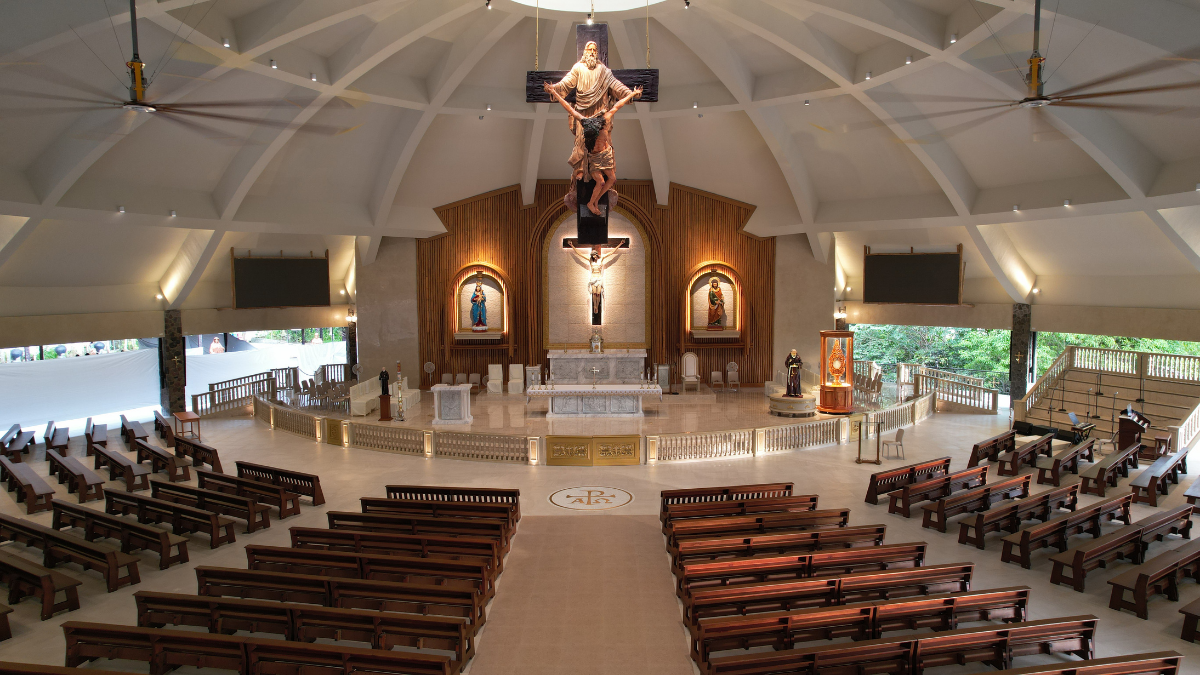
Main Church of Parish and International Shrine of Saint Padre Pio

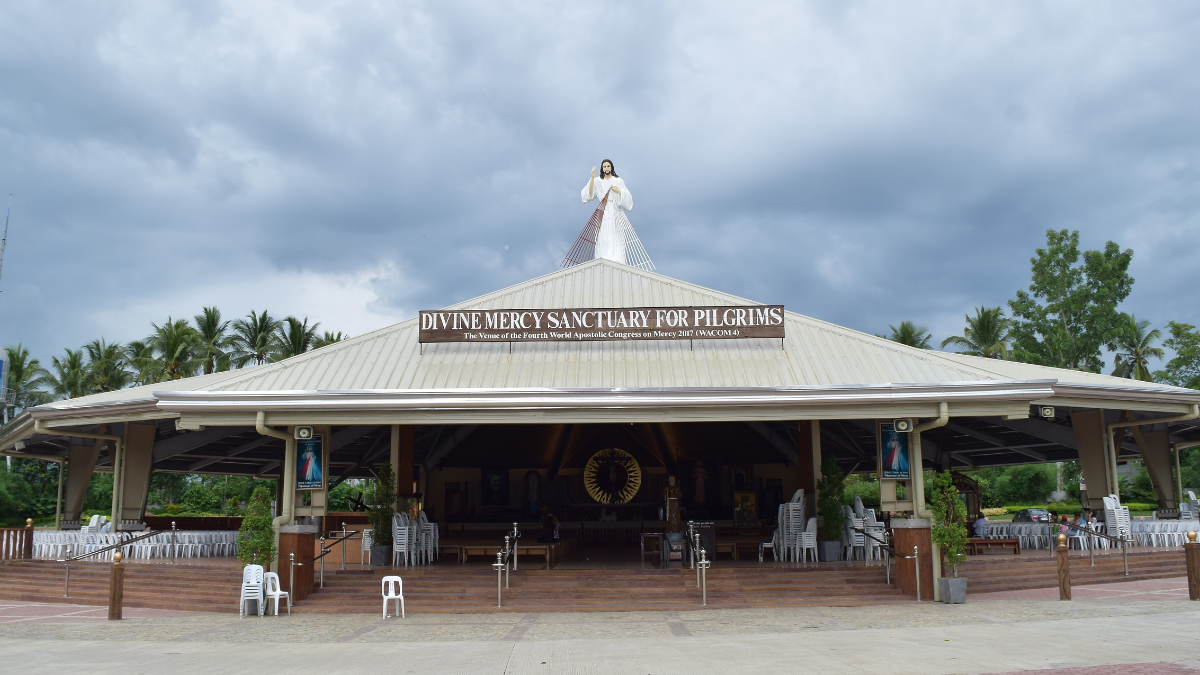
Divine Mercy for Pilgrims of Parish and International Shrine of Saint Padre Pio

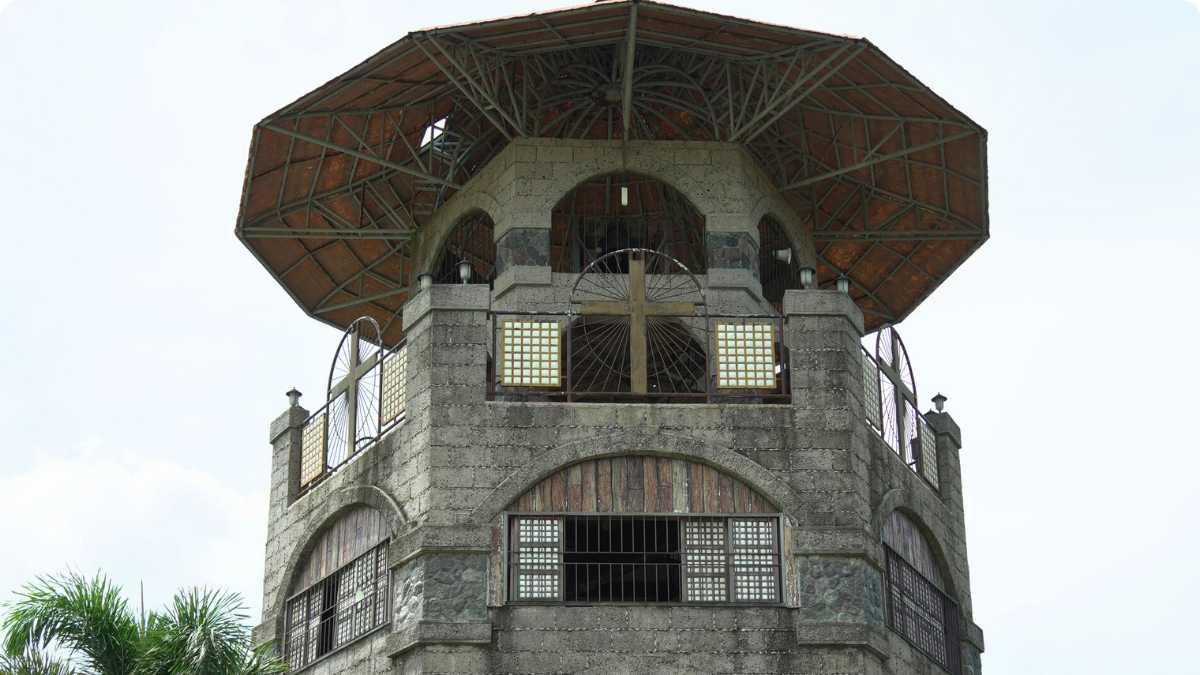
Belfry of Parish and International Shrine of Saint Padre Pio

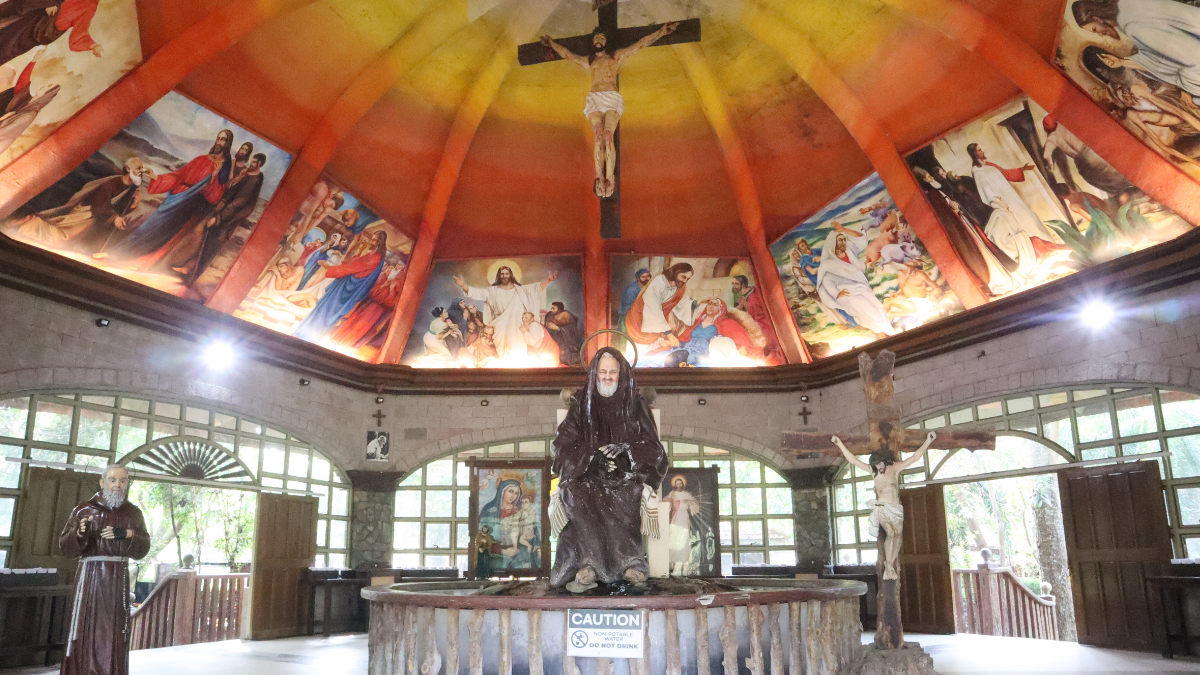
Holy Water Sanctuary of Parish and International Shrine of Saint Padre Pio

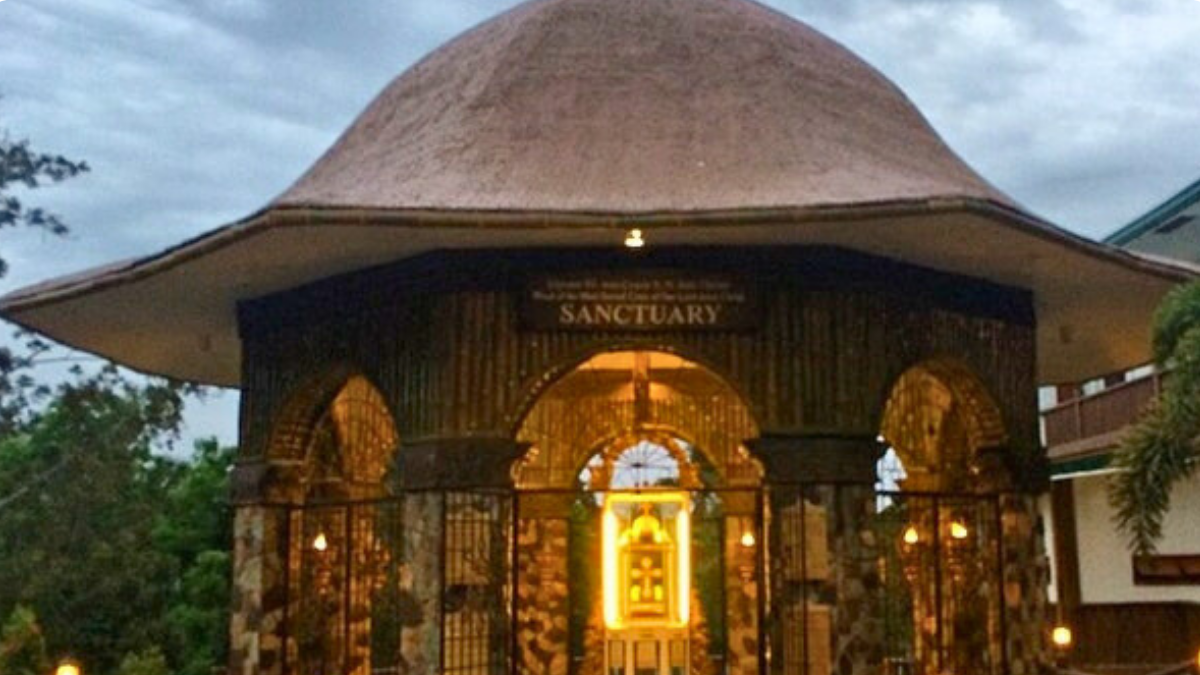
Relic of the True Cross of Parish and International Shrine of Saint Padre Pio

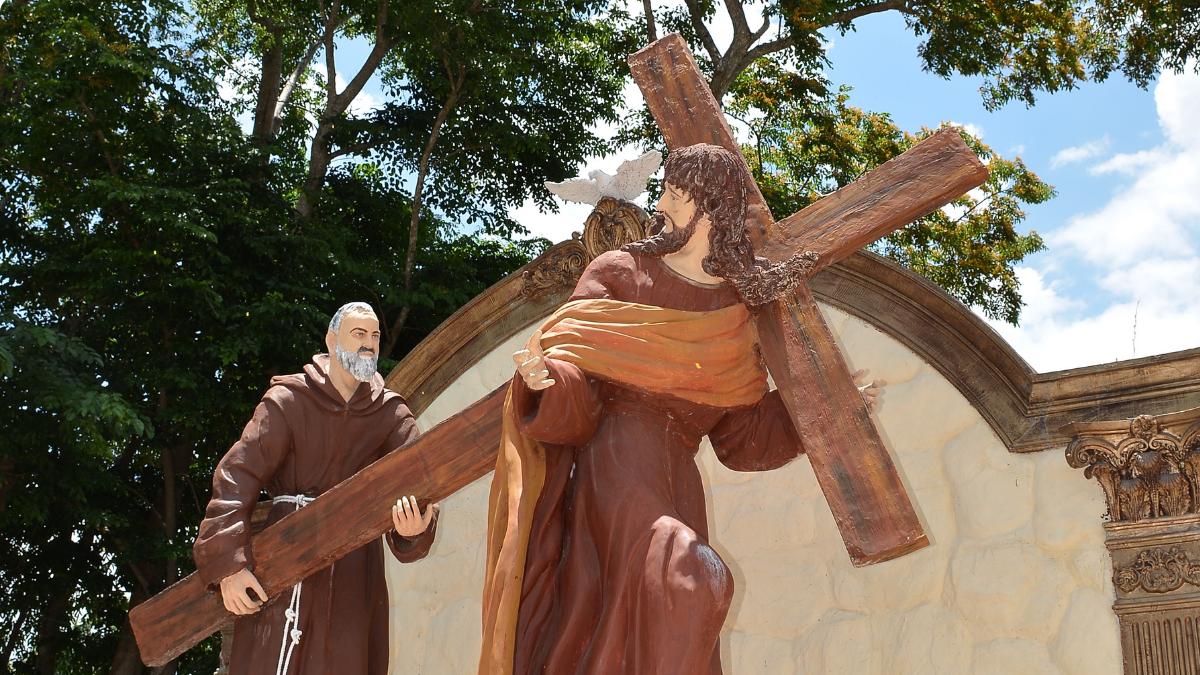
Station of the Cross of Parish and International Shrine of Saint Padre Pio

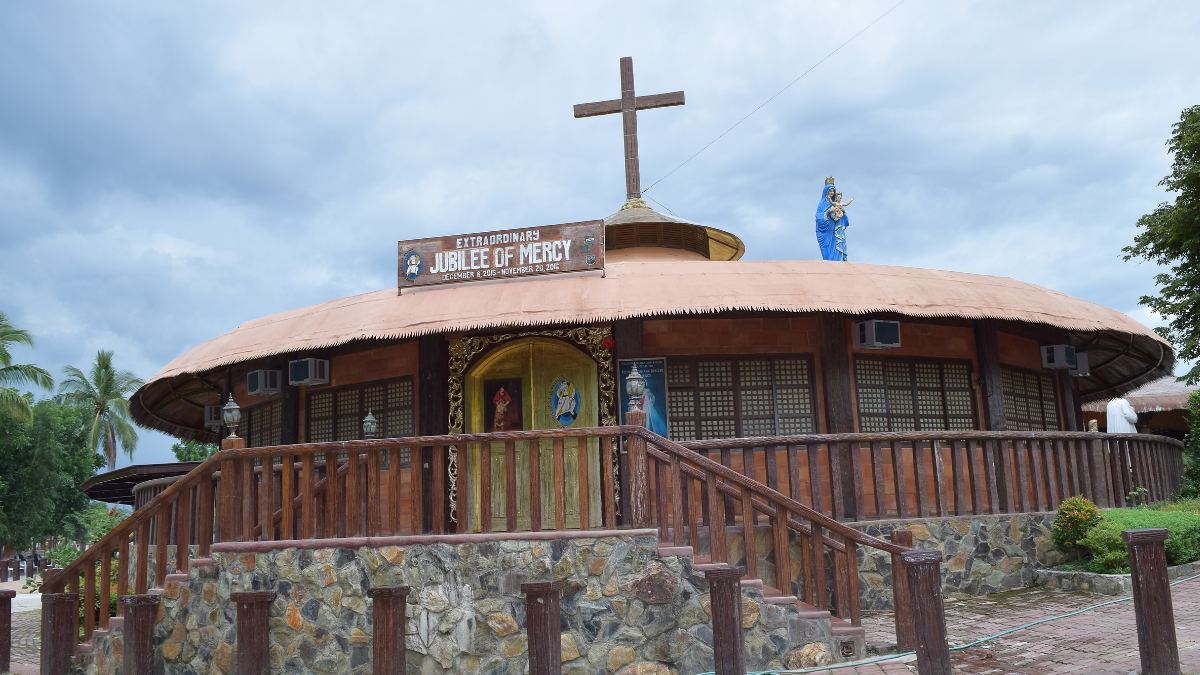
Chapel of Reconciliation of Parish and International Shrine of Saint Padre Pio

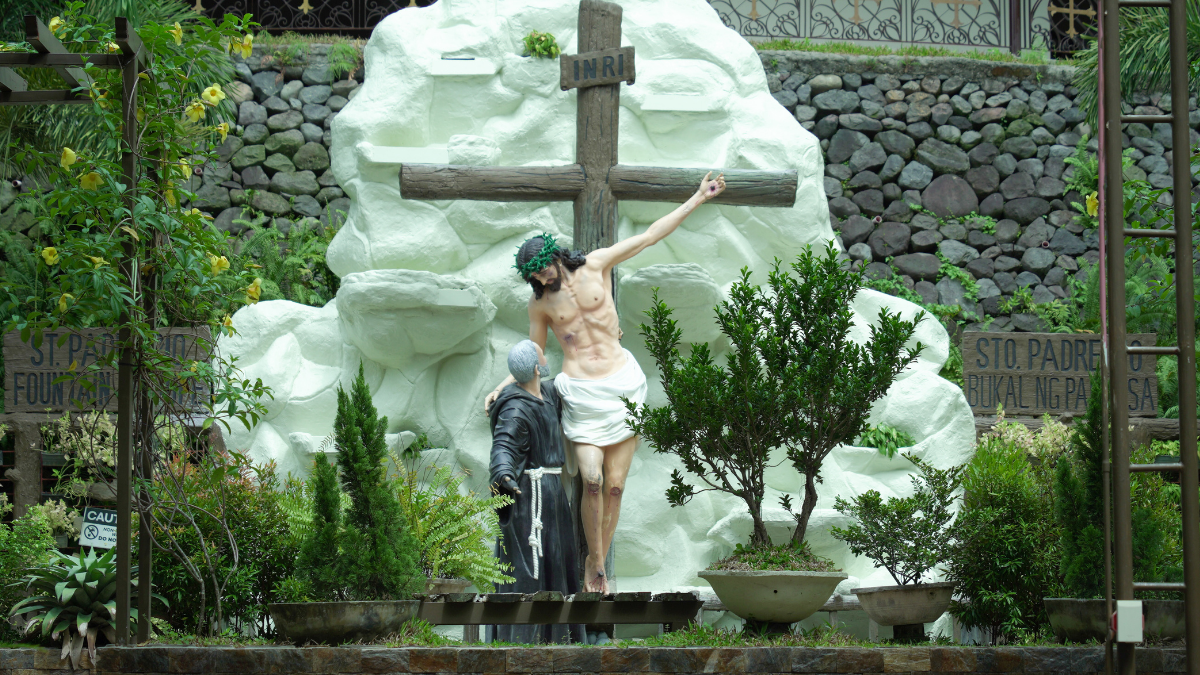
Fountain of Hope of Parish and International Shrine of Saint Padre Pio

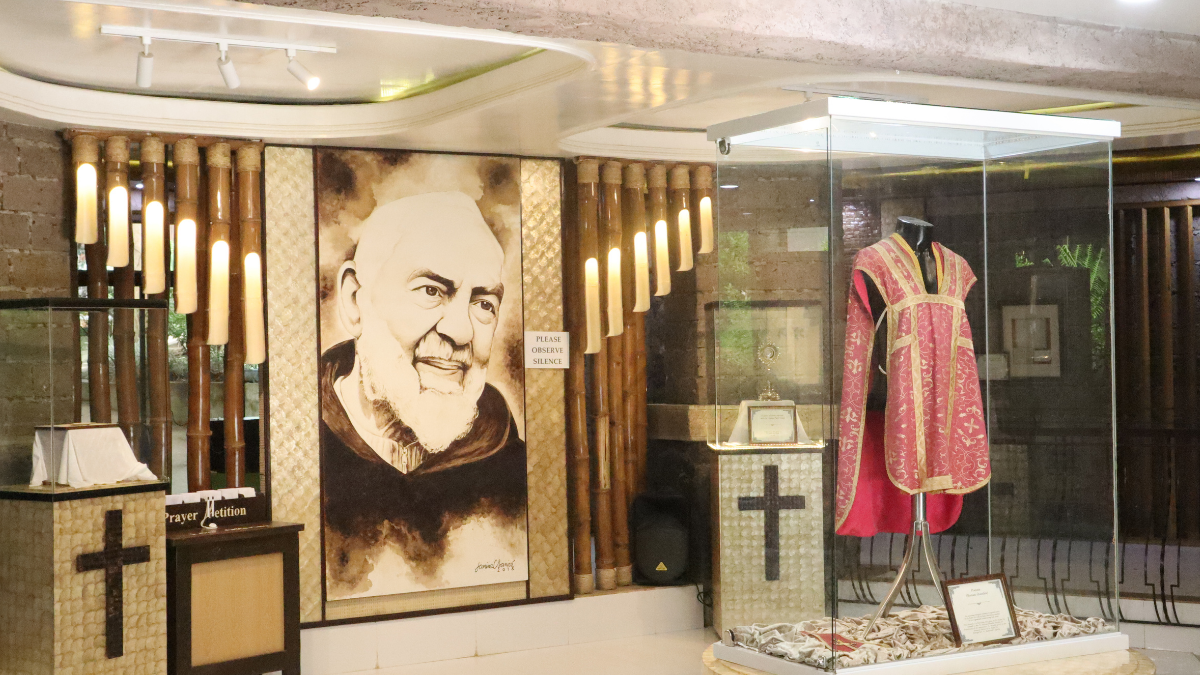
Sanctuary of Relics of Parish and International Shrine of Saint Padre Pio

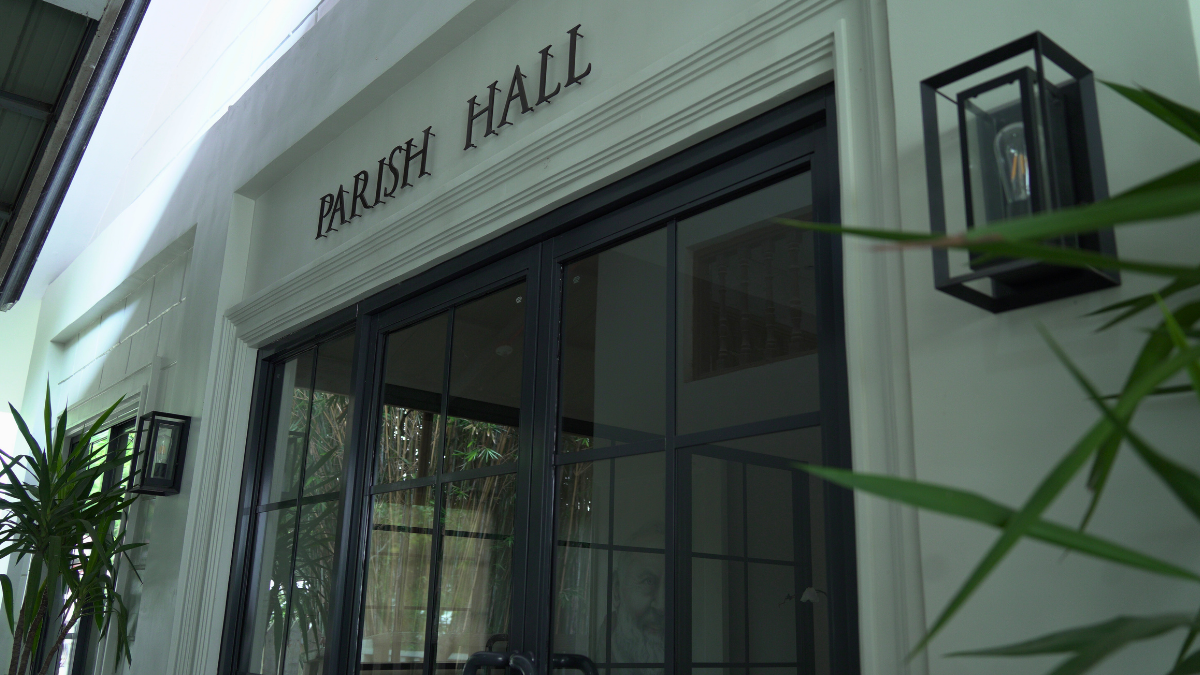
Parish Hall and Clinic of Parish and International Shrine of Saint Padre Pio

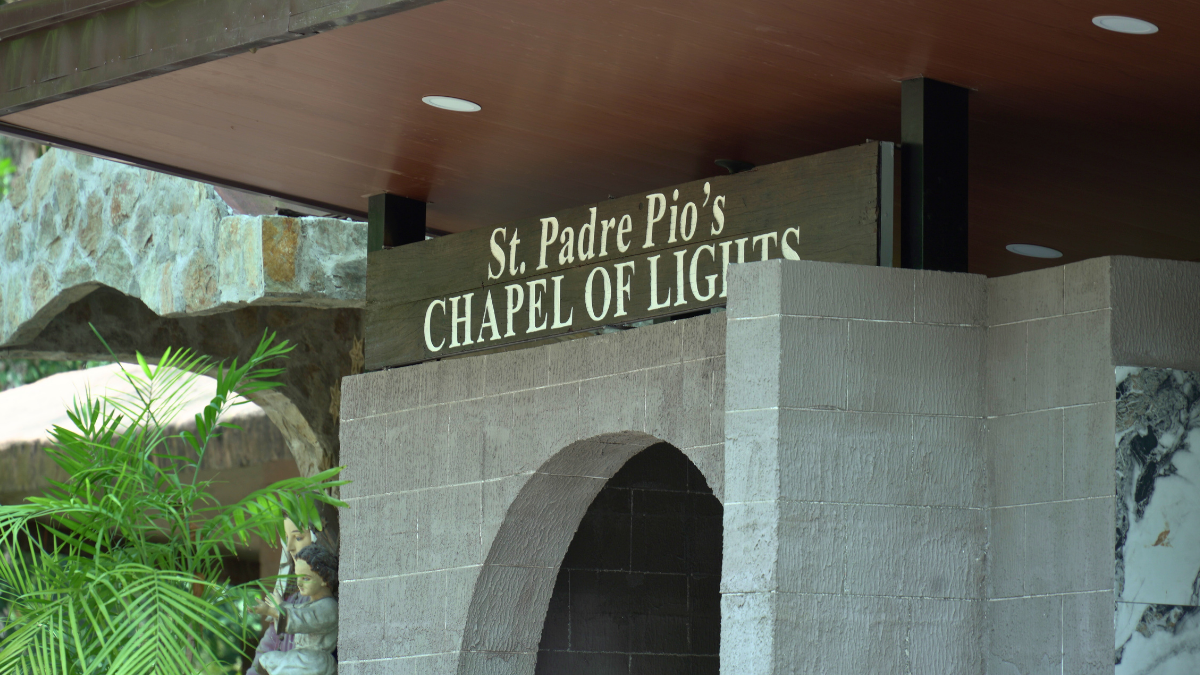
Chapel of Lights of Parish and International Shrine of Saint Padre Pio

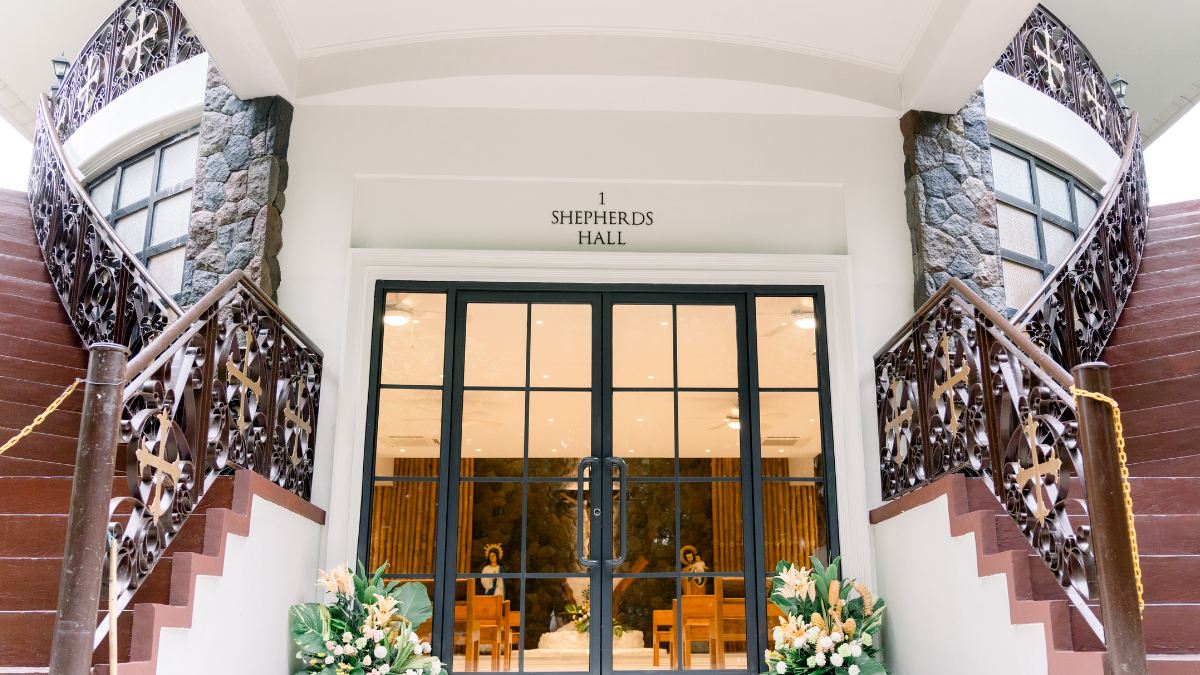
Shepherds Hall of Parish and International Shrine of Saint Padre Pio

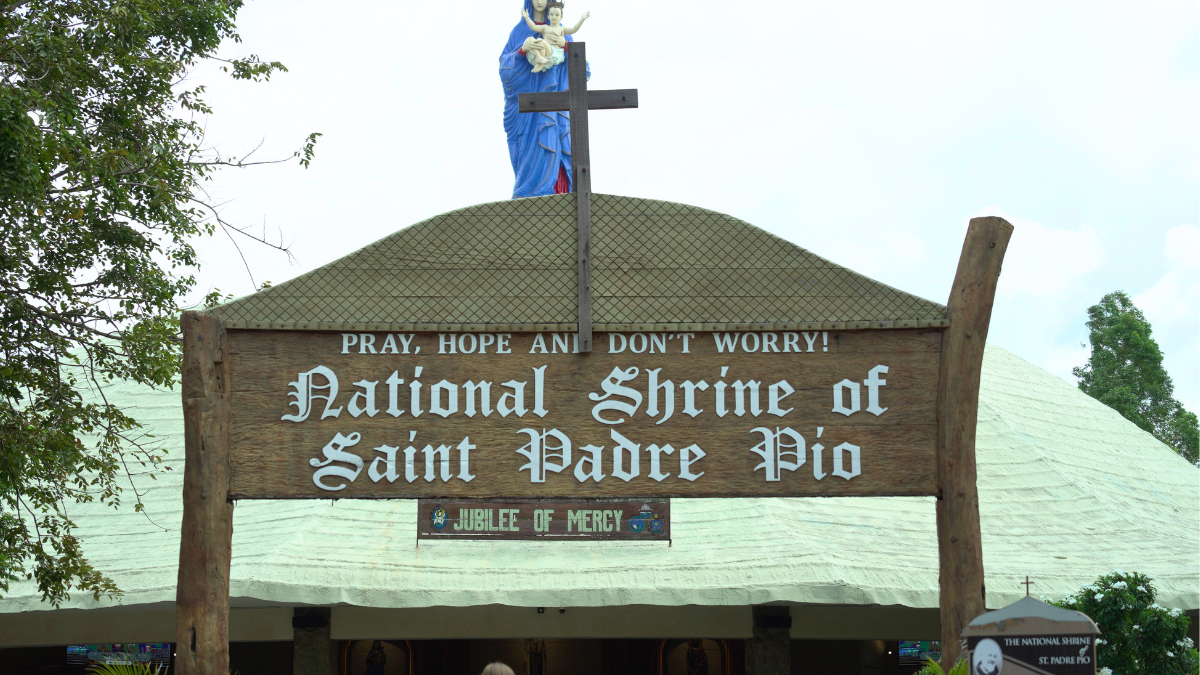
Historical Landmark of Parish and International Shrine of Saint Padre Pio

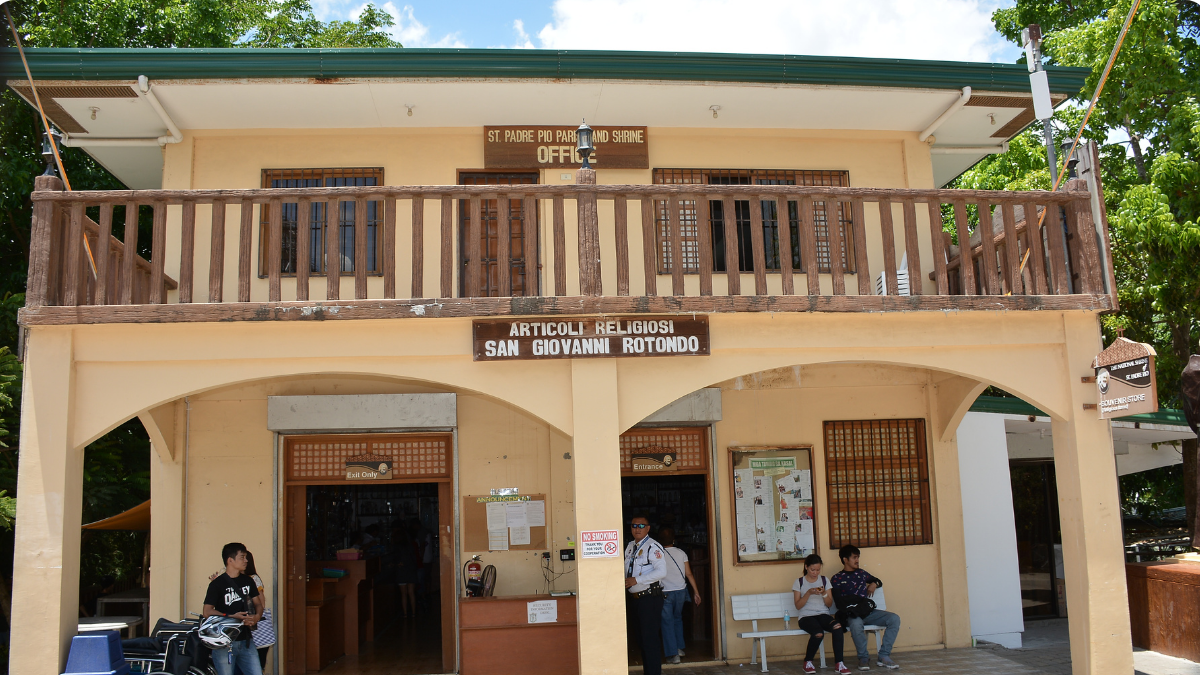
Store and Office of Parish and International Shrine of Saint Padre Pio

== See also ==
- Padre Pio of Pietrelcina
