= Our Lady of Peace and Good Voyage =

Image of Mary, mother of Jesus

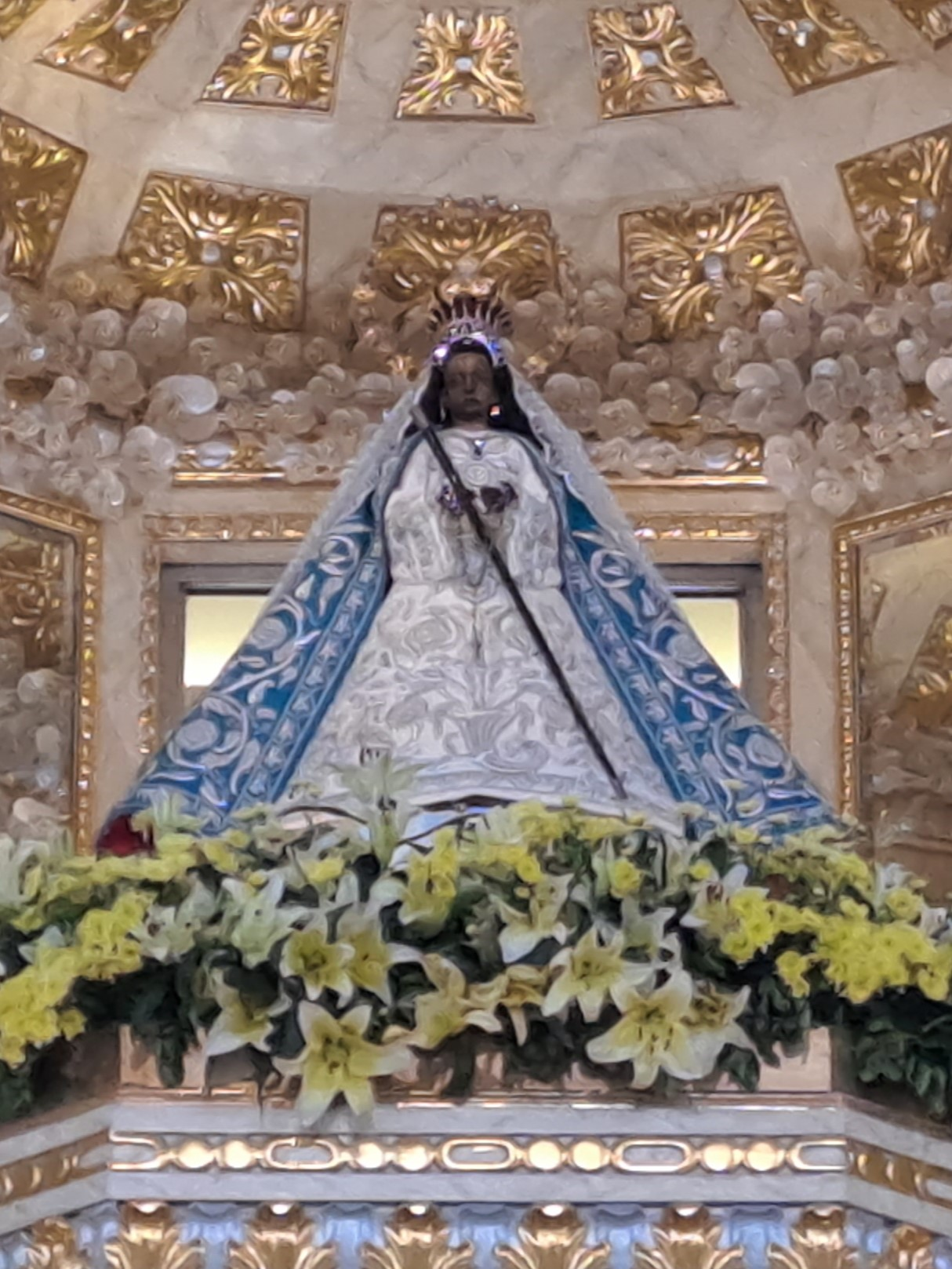
- The original image at the main altarpiece of the cathedral
- Location: Antipolo, Philippines
- Date: 25 March 1626
- Type: Wooden statue
- Approval: Popes Pius XI, Francis, Leo XIV
- Venerated in: Catholic Church
- Shrine: Antipolo Cathedral
- Patronage: Travellers, sailors, Diocese of Antipolo, Marikina, Rizal
- Attributes: Dark complexion, enlarged iris, unbounded hair
- Feast day: First Tuesday in May

Our Lady of Peace and Good Voyage (Latin: Nostra Domina de Pacis et Bonam Navigationem), also known as Our Lady of Antipolo, is a Roman Catholic Marian title of the Blessed Virgin Mary associated with a wooden image that is venerated in the Philippines. This Black Madonna is enshrined in Antipolo Cathedral, east of Metro Manila.

The image was brought to the country by Governor-General Juan Niño de Tabora from Mexico via the Galleon ship El Almirante in 1626. His safe voyage across the Pacific Ocean was attributed to the image, which was given the title of "Our Lady of Peace and Good Voyage". It was substantiated later by six other successful voyages of the Manila-Acapulco Galleons with the image aboard as its patroness.

Pope Pius XI issued a Pontifical decree to crown the image in 1925. The statue is one of the most celebrated Marian images on the Philippines, having been mentioned by nationalist José Rizal in his writings. From May to July each year, the image attracts millions of pilgrims nationwide and overseas. The feast day of Our Lady of Peace and Good Voyage is on the first Tuesday of May.

== History ==
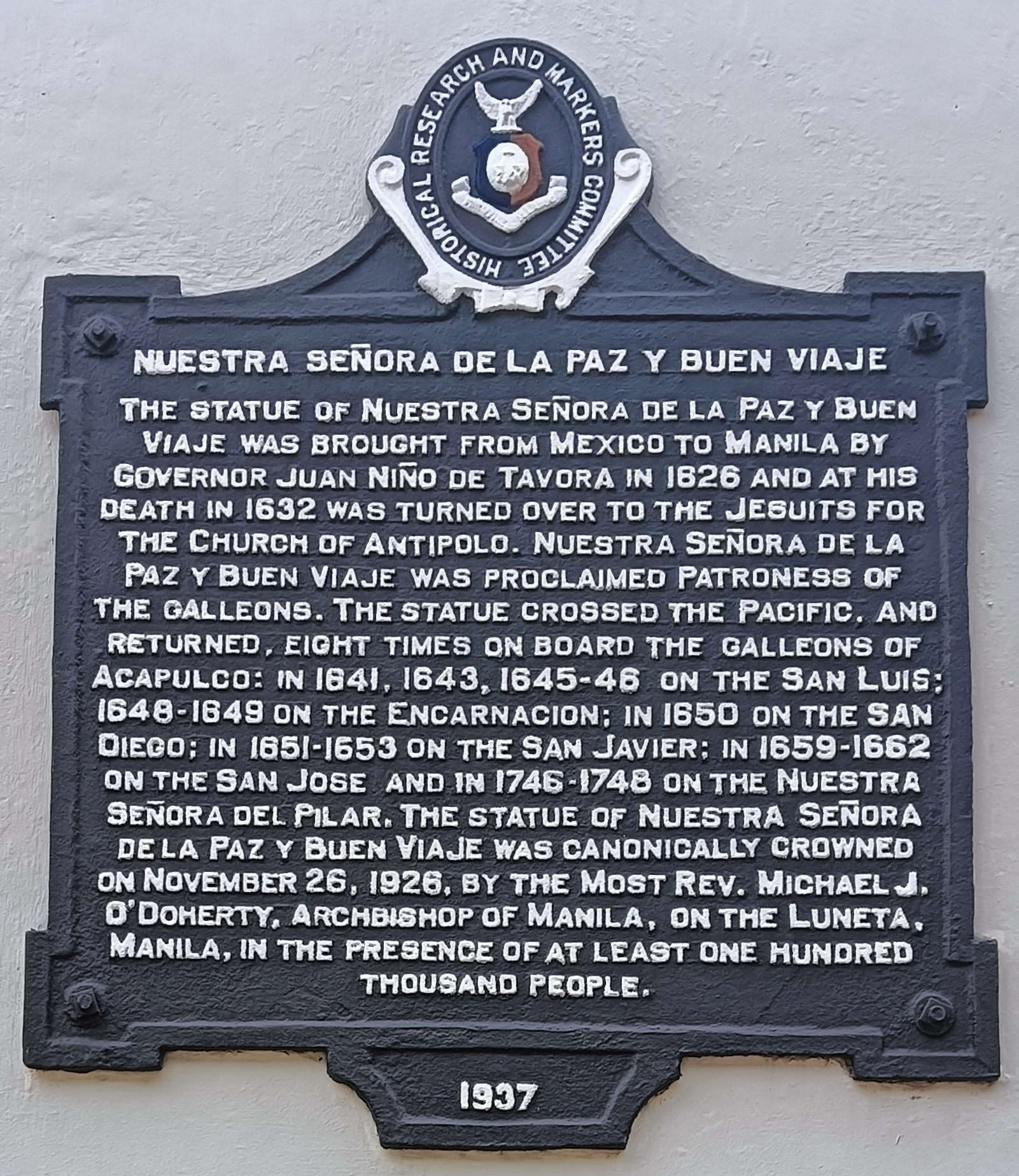
The historical marker of Our Lady of Peace and Good Voyage

On 25 March 1626, the trading galleon El Almirante left Acapulco, Mexico, carrying the newly appointed Governor-General of the Spanish East Indies, Juan Niño de Tabora, who brought with him the statue. He arrived in Manila on 18 July 1626, and the statue was brought to the old San Ignacio Church of the Jesuits in Intramuros. When Tabora died in 1632, the statue was given to the Jesuits for enshrinement in Antipolo Church, which was then being built in the present-day barangay Santa Cruz.

=== Claims of miracles ===
During construction of the Antipolo Church in the 1630s, the image would mysteriously vanish from its shrine several times, reappearing atop a tipolo tree (a type of breadfruit; Artocarpus blancoi, native to the Philippines and had spread to Latin America). This was taken as a celestial sign, and the church was relocated to where the tipolo tree stood. The image's peana (pedestal) is supposedly carved from the trunk of that same tipolo tree, which also gave its name to Antipolo itself.

In 1639, local Chinese rebelled, burning down Antipolo and its church. Fearing for the statue's safety, Governor-General Sebastián Hurtado de Corcuera ordered its transfer to Cavite, where it was temporarily enshrined. Hurtado later ordered the statue removed from Cavite in 1648, and it was shipped back to Mexico aboard the galleon San Luis. At the time, the statue of a saint onboard served as a ship's patron saint or protector of the Acapulco trade.

The statue crossed the Pacific six times aboard the following Manila-Acapulco galleons:

- San Luis (1648–1649)
- Encarnación (1650)
- San Diego (1651–1653)
- San Francisco Javier (1659–1662)
- Nuestra Señora del Pilar (1663)
- San José (1746–1748)

A royal decree by Isabella II of Spain on 19 May 1864 ordered that the parish of Saint Nicholas of Tolentine be turned over to the Jesuits in exchange for the parishes of Antipolo, Taytay and Morong, which were given to the Augustinian Recollects. The latter order thus came into possession of the image.

=== Second World War ===
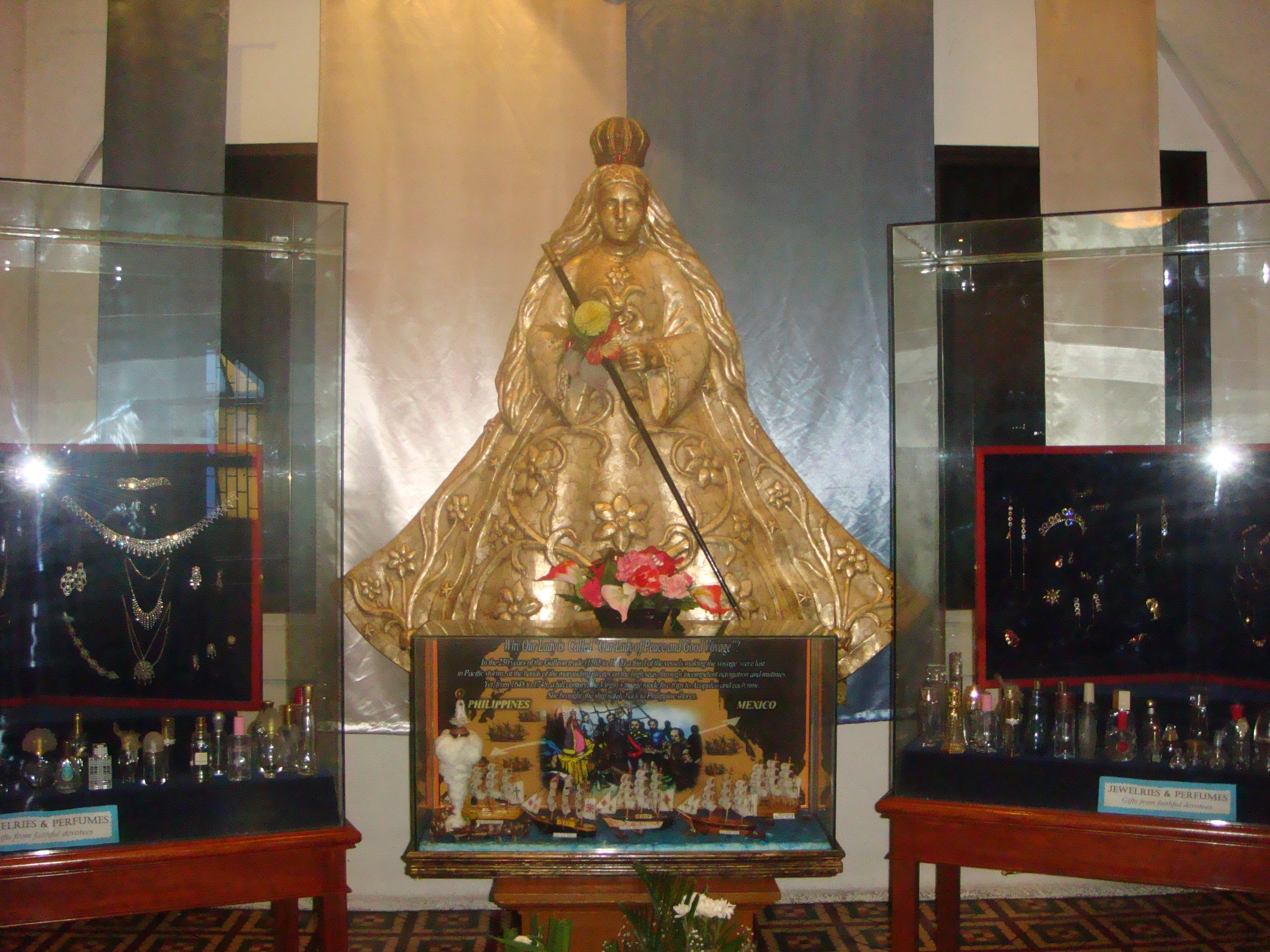
A replica in the image's veneration chapel behind the main altar. The glass cases contain the original image's regalia, perfumes, and scale models of the galleons it travelled on.

In 1944, the Japanese Imperial Army invaded the town and turned it into a garrison, using the shrine as an arsenal. To save the image, the chief sacristan, Procopio Ángeles, wrapped it in a thick woollen blanket and placed it in an empty petrol drum, which he then buried in a nearby kitchen.

Fighting between Imperial Japanese troops and combined American and Filipino forces drove Ángeles and other devotees on 19 February 1945 to exhume the image and move it to Sitio Colaique on the border with Angono. From there, it was spirited away to the lowland Barangay Santolan in Pasig, and then to the town center of Pasig itself. The statue was then kept by Rosario Alejandro, daughter of Pablo Ocampo, at the Ocampo-Santiago family residence on Hidalgo Street, Quiapo, Manila, before it was enshrined inside Quiapo Church for the remainder of the Second World War. On 15 October 1945, the statue was translated back to its church in Antipolo.

== Pontifical approbations ==
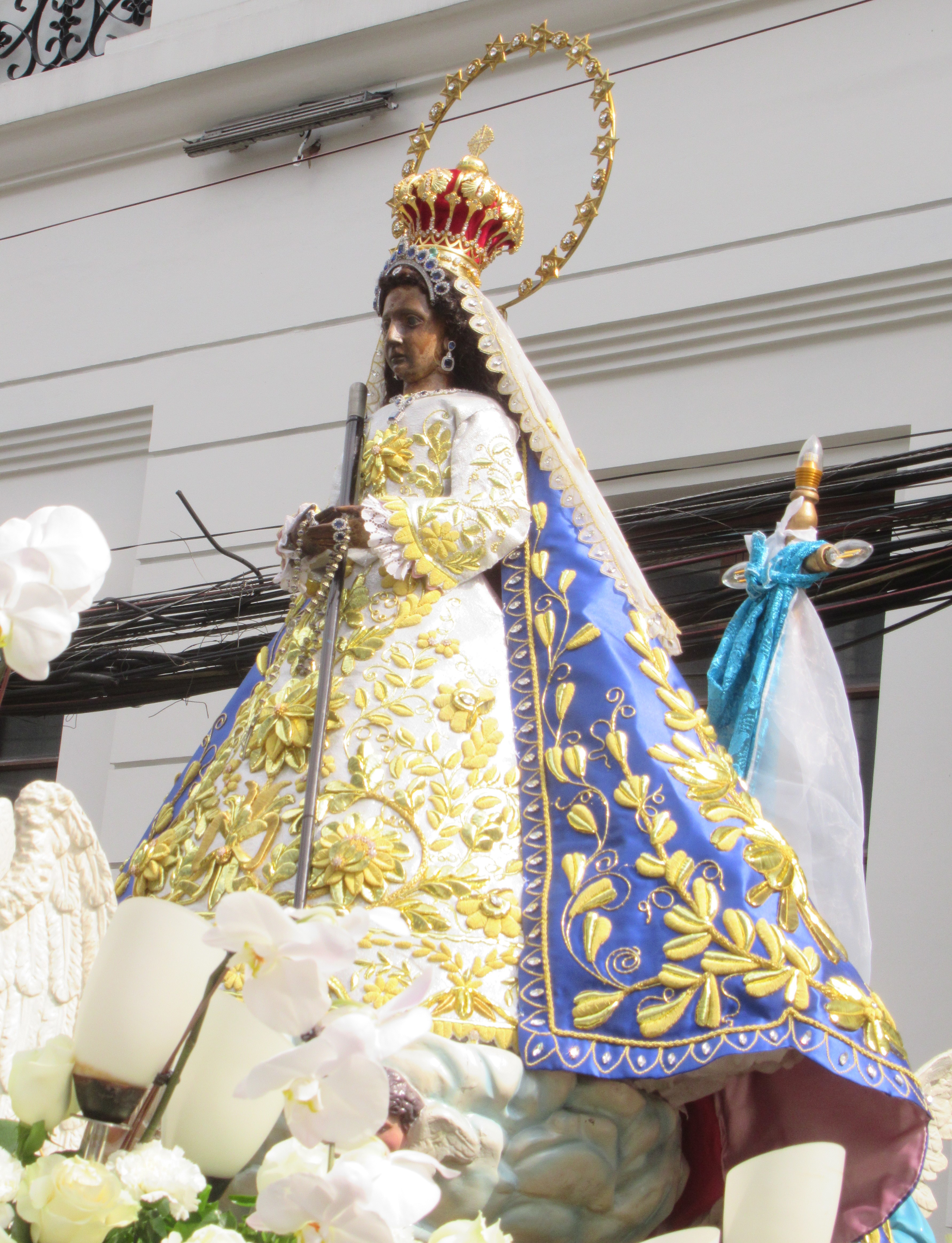
The original image of Our Lady of Antipolo at the 41st Intramuros Grand Marian procession. This was the first time the image was paraded in Intramuros.

- Pope Pius XI granted a decree of pontifical coronation to the image via the former Archpriest of Saint Peter's Basilica, Cardinal Rafael Merry del Val, on 19 June 1925. The coronation rite was performed by former Archbishop of Manila, Michael James O'Doherty, on 28 November 1926 at Luneta.
- Pope Francis raised the cathedral to the rank of an international shrine on 18 June 2022, making it the eleventh worldwide, third shrine in Asia, first in Southeast Asia, first Marian International Shrine in Asia, and the first in the Philippines. The decree took effect on 25 March 2023, and the solemn declaration was held on 26 January 2024.
- Pope Francis gifted a Golden Rose to the image on 26 February 2024.

== Cathedral shrine ==
The first missionaries in Antipolo were the Friars Minor, who arrived in 1578. The Jesuits then followed and administered the church from 1591 until May 1768, when the decree expelling them from Spanish lands reached Manila.

The church was greatly damaged during the 1639 Chinese rebellion, the 1645 Luzon earthquake, and the earthquakes of 1824 and 1883. Notable Filipino historians such as Pedro Chirino and Pedro Murillo Velarde (also a prominent cartographer) ministered at the church.

The Diocese of Antipolo was created on 24 January 1983 and canonically erected on 25 June 1983. The shrine was made the new diocese's episcopal see, and now bears the formal title of "International Shrine of Our Lady of Peace and Good Voyage-Immaculate Conception Parish".

=== Pilgrimage ===
Antipolo Pilgrimage Season Ahunan sa Antipolo
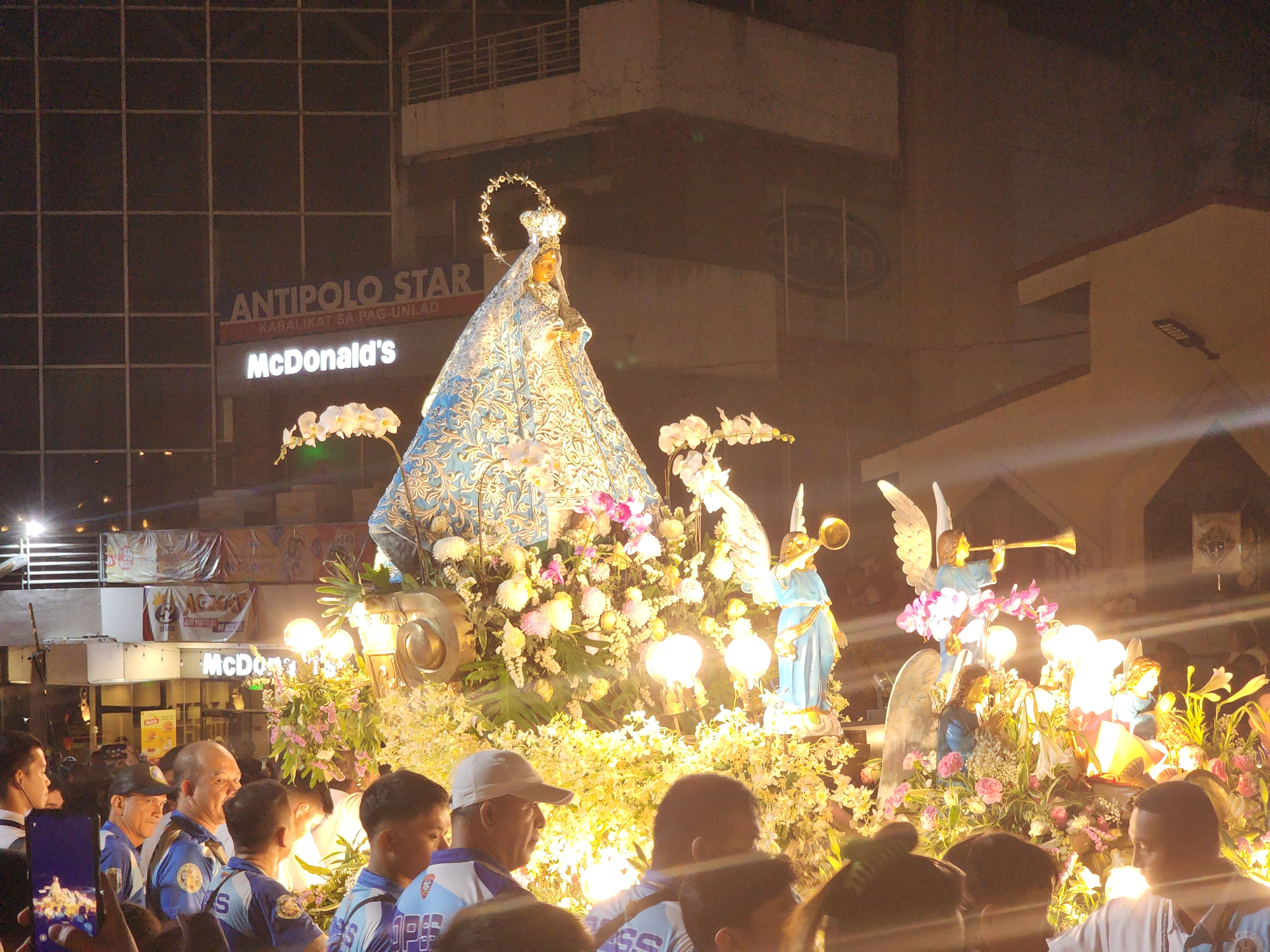
- The image of Our Lady of Peace and Good Voyage outside Antipolo Cathedral, as pictured on 1 May 2025.
- Observed by: Antipolo
- Type: Local/Religious/Cultural
- Observances: processions, rosary and novenas
- Begins: First Tuesday in May
- Ends: First Tuesday in July (or second Tuesday if it starts on 6 or 7 May)
- 2025 date: 6 May – 8 July
- 2026 date: 5 May – 7 July
- 2027 date: 4 May – 6 July
- 2028 date: 2 May – 4 July
- Duration: 63 days
- Frequency: Annual

Pilgrimages to the image's shrine begin and peak in May, which in Catholicism is dedicated to the Virgin Mary. Locally known as Ahunan sa Antipolo and dubbed as the "Longest Pilgrimage Season in the Philippines", it is initiated yearly by the Pagdalaw ng Ina sa Anak (Mother's Visit to her Son), which is the temporary transfer of the image from Antipolo Cathedral to Quiapo Church enshrining the image of the Black Nazarene. It is usually held on the Saturday before 1 May, with a welcome Mass said in Quiapo Church in the morning. On the preceding evening, 30 April, thousands of devotees from Metro Manila customarily perform the Alay Lakad (literally, “Walk Offering”), spending the night on foot, walking 24 kilometers (15 mi) to the shrine to hear Mass at dawn. The procession follows the "Way of Mary", a set of friezes built between 2004 and 2007 depicting all twenty Mysteries of the Rosary, along a 14-kilometer (8.7 mi) stretch of Ortigas Avenue from EDSA Shrine to Antipolo. This is one of only two times the Alay Lakad is done, the other being the night of Maundy Thursday.

The custom of visiting Antipolo in May, however, was already recorded by the 19th century. On 6 June 1868, young José Rizal and his father, Francisco Mercado, visited the shrine in thanksgiving after the boy and his mother, Teodora Alonso Realonda, survived her delivery in 1861.

The nine-week pilgrimage season starts on the first Tuesday in May of each year. Since 2019, the solemnity of Our Lady of Peace and Good Voyage is celebrated on this day, pursuant to a decree dated 21 May 2018 by the former Bishop of Antipolo, Francisco Mendoza de Leon. On that day, a procession of the image starts at 7:00 a.m. from the cathedral to Pinagmisahan Hill, where a thanksgiving Mass has been celebrated since 1947. It was here on 3 May, the Feast of the Finding of the Holy Cross, that a wooden cross was blessed and erected. The pilgrimage season ends on the first Tuesday in July.

Rosary and novena prayers of seven sets are held during the pilgrimage season, with a Marian procession held at the end of each set.

== Television ==
In December 2011, the Eternal Word Television Network programme Mary: Mother of the Philippines ran an episode showcasing the statue as the “most traveled Marian icon in the Philippines”.

== See also ==
- Catholic Church in the Philippines
- Marian Shrines in the Philippines
