= Jose L. de Ocampo =

Filipino architect and artist (1906–1995)

Jose Lorenzo de Ocampo (1906–1995) was a Filipino architect and artist.

== Personal life ==
Born on February 18, 1906, he was the oldest child of José Gabriel de Ocampo and Felicia Gómez. He was first educated at Colegio de La Inmaculada Concepción in Vigan, Ilocos Sur, then moved to Manila and studied at the Ateneo de Manila and the Mapúa Institute of Technology. He eventually received his Bachelor of Science degree in Architecture at the University of Santo Tomas. He was a professor at the University of Santo Tomas and Adamson University.

He married Carmen Ravasco y Nakpil of Santa Cruz, Manila, on May 26, 1934, Together, they had 8 children.

He is best known for his work on the Antipolo Cathedral which was completed in 1954 after the old church was destroyed during World War II.

After his architectural career, he relocated to San Mateo, California, where he retired and devoted himself to painting and other visual arts. He died in San Mateo on September 25, 1995.

== Works ==
=== Churches ===
- Antipolo Cathedral - Antipolo, Rizal
- Saint Joseph Church - Trozo, Manila
- Santa Rita Orphanage Chapel - Paranaque
- Teresa Town Church - Teresa, Rizal (1951)

=== Colleges ===
- St. Paul's College (addition to school building) - Bocaue, Bulacan
- St. Paul's College - Paranaque
- San Joseph College - Cavite
- Saint Rita College - San Sebastian, Quiapo, Manila
- Santa Rita College - San Carlos, Negros
- Santa Rita Novitiate - Tagaytay City, Cavite
- University of Santo Tomas nurses homes (collaborative project) - Manila

=== Hotels ===
- Globe Hotel and Restaurant (later changed to Mamon Luk restaurant) - Quiapo, Manila
- Swiss Inn - Manila (remodel)

=== Medical offices ===
- Dr. Oscar M. Andres – Galt, California
- Dr. Jesus C. Delgado Clinic – Quezon City
- ZODIAC Pharmaceutical – Manila (remodel)

=== Apartments ===
- Mr. and Mrs. Jesus Andres – Kamuning, Quezon City
- Mr. and Mrs. Numeriano Bustillios – Bali-Bali, Quezon City
- Dona Felisa G. de Ocampo – Santa Cruz, Manila
- Dr. and Mrs. Jesus C. Delgado – Kamuning, Quezon City
- Mr. and Mrs. Rafael Gomez – Mandaluyong, Rizal
- Dr. and Mrs. Pedro Narciso – Azcarraga (now Claro M. Recto) and Mendiola, Manila
- Mr. and Mrs. Antonio Santisteban – Manila
- Swiss Inn – Manila

=== Residences ===
- Bishop of Zamboanga, Msgr. Luis Del Rosario, S.J. – Zamboanga City (1952)
- Dr. and Mrs. Jesus C. Delgado – Lantana St., Quezon City
- Dr. and Mrs. Jesus C. Delgado – Sampaloc Ave., Quezon City
- Mr. and Mrs. Jose Del Carman – Santa Mesa, Manila
- Mr. and Mrs. Antonio de Ocampo – Santa Mesa, Manila
- Dona Carmen R. de Ocampo – Little Baguio, San Juan, Rizal
- Dona Felisa G. de Ocampo – Santa Mesa, Manila
- Atty. Jose Galan Blanco – San Juan, Rizal
- Mr. and Mrs. Rafael Gomez – Santa Mesa, Manila
- Mr. and Mrs. Jose M. Hernandez
- Dr. and Mrs. Pedro Narciso – San Juan, Rizal
- Mr. and Mrs. Ernesto Paguio
- Mr. and Mrs. Pedro N. Ravasco – Mandaluyong, Rizal
- Mr. and Mrs. Richard Swesiger – San Juan, Rizal

== Painting ==
- "Coronation of Sta. Rita de Casia", 1927, oil on canvas. National Gallery of Art, Manila, Philippines
- Pope John Paul I – on display at St. Timothy’s Church, San Mateo, California
- Pope John Paul II – on display St. Timothy’s Church, San Mateo, California
- Five pastors of St. Timothy Church (Fr. Joseph A. Fitzpatrick, Fr. J. Norman Allen, Fr. George R. Meyer, Fr. Robert Kevin White, and Fr. Vincent D. Ring)
- President Corazon Aquino of the Philippines
- The children of Bob & Mary Werderman of Belmont, California
- Mark, Eymard, and Hedwig de Ocampo of San Mateo, California
- Ann Feriante of San Mateo, California
- Four pastors of All Souls Church in South San Francisco, California
- Msgr. Timothy Gallahan, Pastor of St. Matthew’s Church, San Mateo, California
- Msgr. Francisco Avendano, Honorary Prelate, Antipolo, Rizal
- Mrs. Da Rosa
