= Antipolo Cathedral =

Roman Catholic church in Antipolo, Philippines

- International Shrine of Our Lady of Peace and Good Voyage
- Immaculate Conception Parish
- Pandaigdigang Dambana ng Birhen ng Kapayapaan at Mabuting Paglalakbay (Filipino); Santuario Internacional de Nuestra Señora de la Paz y Buen Viaje (Spanish)
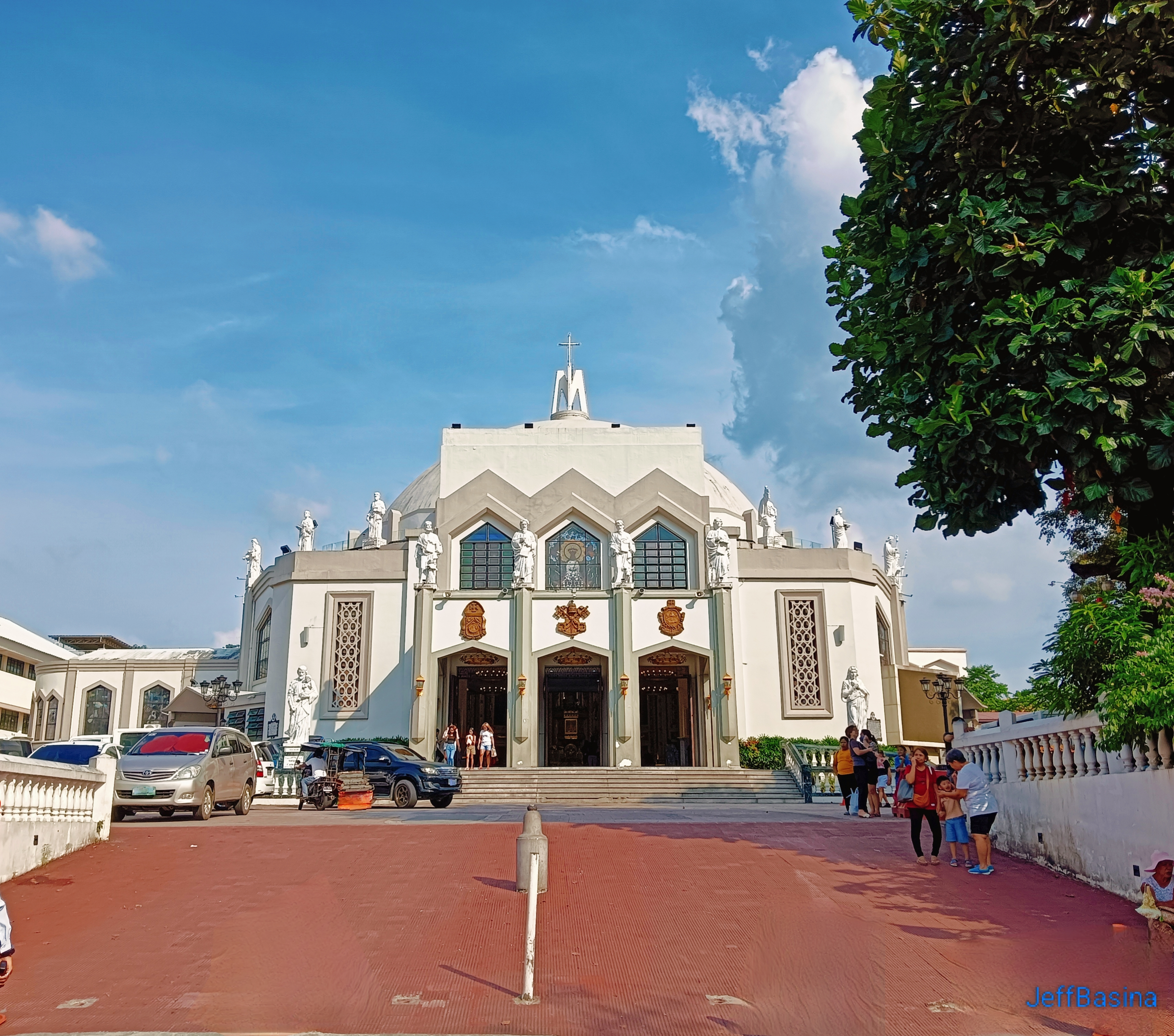
- The cathedral in November 2025

- Location in Luzon Location in the Philippines
- 14°35′15″N 121°10′36″E
- Location: Antipolo, Rizal
- Country: Philippines
- Denomination: Roman Catholic
- Website: Antipolo Cathedral

History
- Former name: Church of Antipolo
- Status: Cathedral; International shrine
- Founded: 1591; 435 years ago
- Founder: Juan de Salazar
- Dedication: Immaculate Conception
- Dedicated: December 5, 2004; 21 years ago
- Consecrated: 1954; 72 years ago St. Francis of Assisi

Architecture
- Functional status: Active
- Architect: José L. de Ocampo
- Architectural type: Church building
- Style: Modern
- Years built: c. 1591–c. 1632 (dst. 1639); c. 1640s (dst. 1645, 1824, 1863, and 1945); 1948–1954
- Groundbreaking: 1948; 78 years ago
- Completed: 1954; 72 years ago

Specifications
- Materials: Cement

Administration
- Province: Manila
- Diocese: Antipolo
- Deanery: Our Lady of Peace and Good Voyage
- Parish: Immaculate Conception

Clergy
- Bishop: Ruperto Cruz Santos
- Rector: Ruperto Cruz Santos
- Vicar(s): Keith Buenaventura; Manjorey Padilla

The International Shrine of Our Lady of Peace and Good Voyage, commonly known as Antipolo Cathedral and alternatively known as the Immaculate Conception Parish (Filipino: Parokya ng Kalinis-linisang Paglilihi), is a Roman Catholic cathedral in Antipolo, Philippines. It enshrines a venerated Black Madonna image of the Blessed Virgin Mary under the title of Our Lady of Peace and Good Voyage (Spanish: Nuestra Señora de la Paz y Buen Viaje), and serves as the seat of the Bishop of Antipolo.

The shrine attracts millions of pilgrims annually, especially during the pilgrimage season from May to July each year.

== History ==
=== Early churches ===
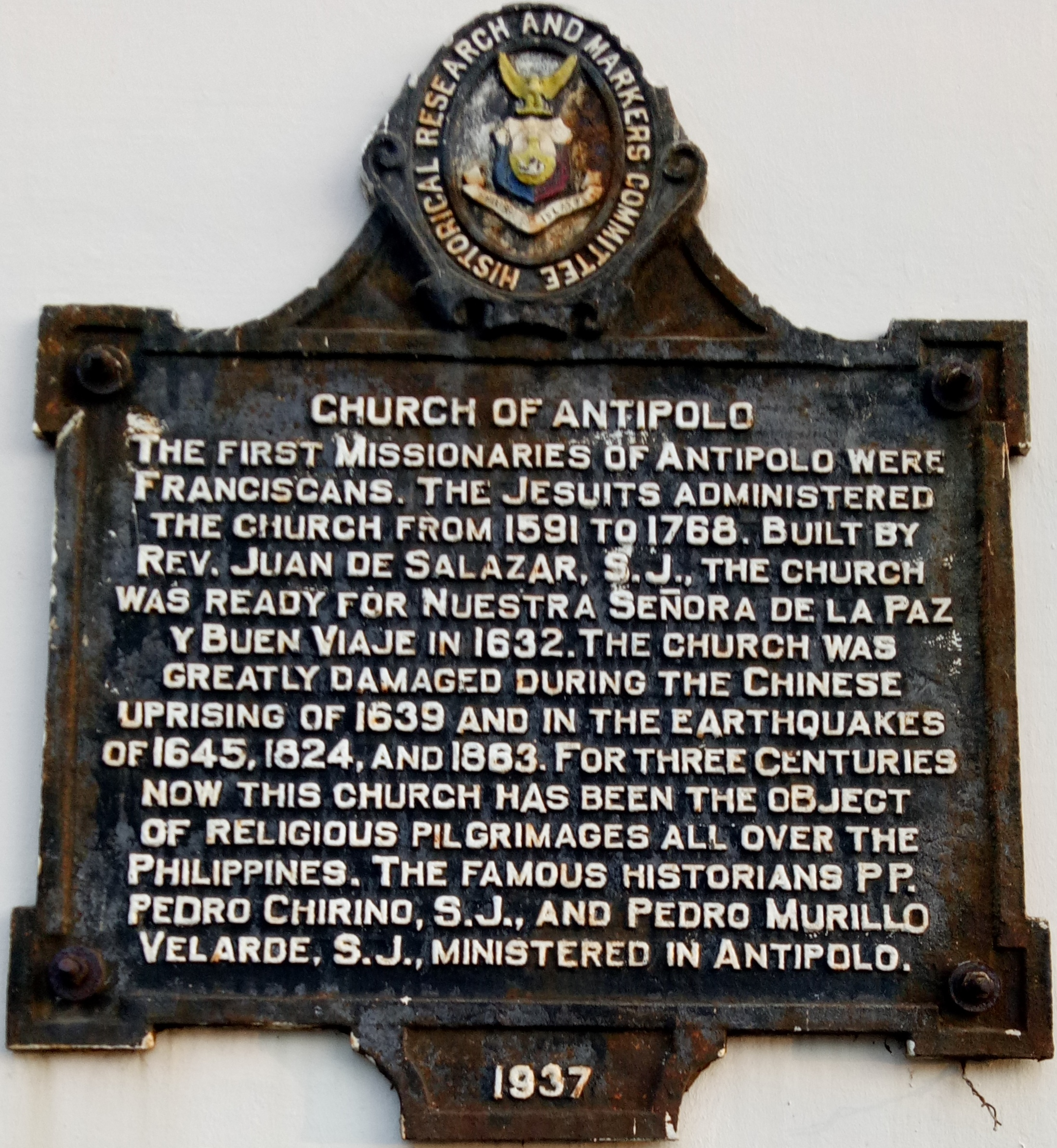
Church HRMC historical marker installed in 1937

The first missionaries of Antipolo were the Franciscans. The first church in Antipolo was built by the Society of Jesus under Juan de Salazar. The Jesuits administered the church from 1591 to 1768. The church was prepared for the image of Nuestra Señora dela Paz y Buen Viaje in 1632. However, the church structure was greatly damaged during the 2nd Sangley Rebellion (1639) and the earthquakes of 1645, 1824 and 1863. The church, meant to house the image of Our Lady of Peace and Good Voyage brought by then-Governor General Juan Niño de Tabora, was supposed to be built on a different plot of land. The church's present location was the site of the tipolo (Artocarpus blancoi), top which the image was found after mysteriously vanishing several times.

The church was completed in 1632, but suffered severe damage in 1639 when the Sangley (Chinese) set fire to the church in a revolt. It was restored afterwards though it was damaged by the 1645 Luzon earthquake, and other earthquakes in 1824 and 1863. Nevertheless, the church became a popular pilgrimage site as many devotees paid reverence to Our Lady of Peace and Good Voyage, including Philippine national hero and polymath José Rizal, who visited the shrine as a boy with his father, Francisco Rizal Mercado, on June 6, 1868. The pair went on pilgrimage to fulfill a vow Rizal's mother, Teodora Alonso Realonda, had made when she and the boy survived his delivery.

=== World War II ===
During World War II, the invading Japanese Imperial Army used the church as their garrison and arsenal. The Virgin of Antipolo image was safekept in a nearby kitchen; it was later exhumed and moved to Angono, Pasig, and Quiapo until its transfer on October 15, 1945, to its current location in Antipolo.

=== Post-war reconstruction ===
Towards the end of World War II in 1945, the church was destroyed by Allied bombardment meant to liberate the area from the Japanese imperial control.

After the war, a campaign was organized to build a new church, with the fundraising committee headed by former First Lady Aurora Quezon, and Antipolo parish priest Francisco Avendano. Architect Jose L. de Ocampo was commissioned to design the new shrine. Construction began in 1948 and was completed in 1954.

On January 14, 1954, the Catholic Bishops' Conference of the Philippines (CBCP) declared the church as the National Shrine of Our Lady of Peace and Good Voyage, making it the first national shrine in the Philippines and Southeast Asia.

The church was elevated to the status of cathedral on June 25, 1983, upon the canonical erection of the Diocese of Antipolo.

=== Elevation to an international shrine ===
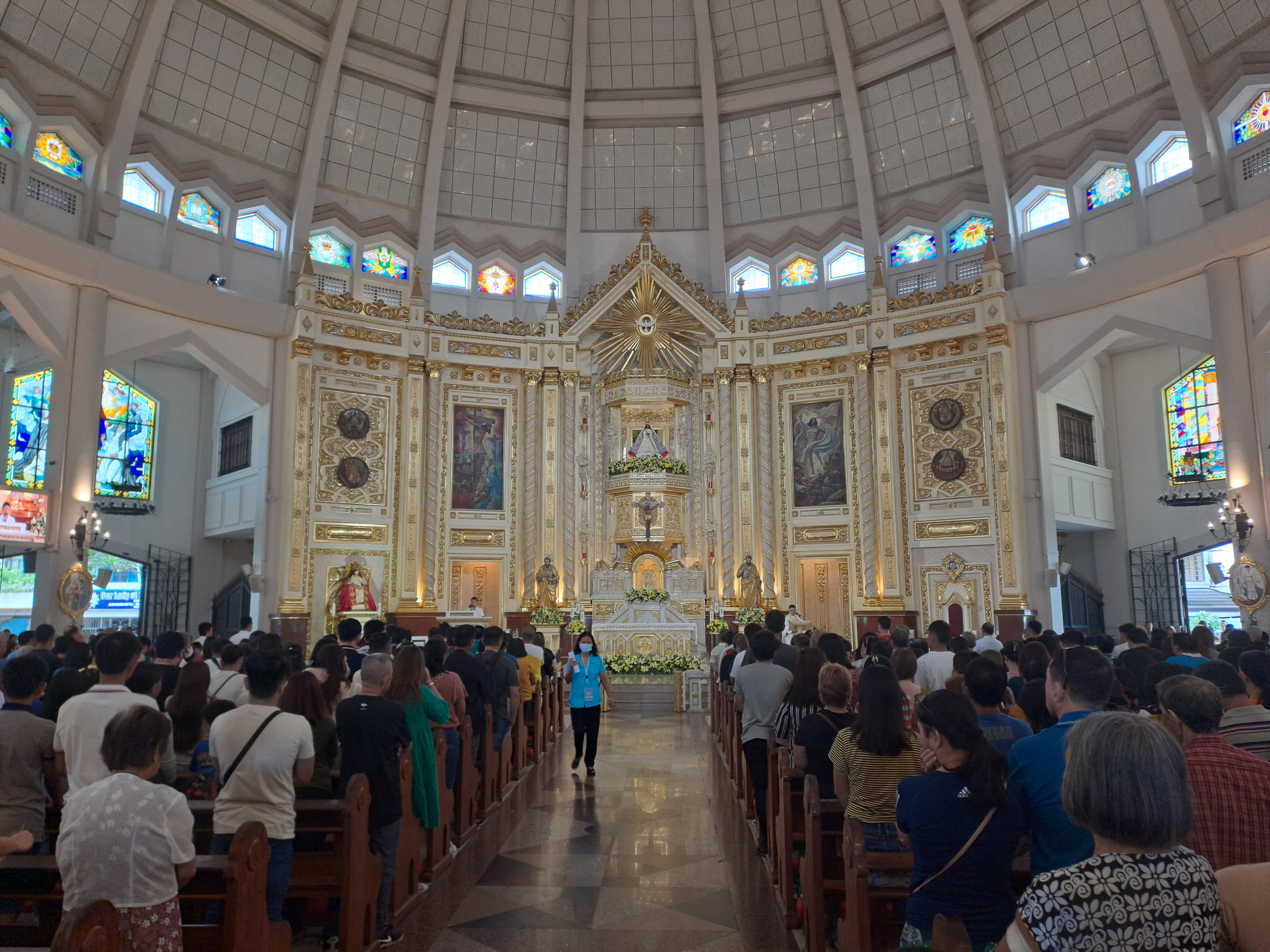
Cathedral interior and high altar in 2023

On July 26, 2021, the CBCP endorsed a petition to elevate the cathedral as an international shrine, which was approved by the Holy See's Dicastery for Evangelization on June 18, 2022. The papal decree elevating the cathedral as an international shrine was received on March 13, 2023, and took effect on March 25 (coinciding with the Feast of the Annunciation).

The decree made the church the first international shrine in the Philippines and Southeast Asia, the eleventh in the world, and the third in Asia after the St. Thomas Church Malayattoor in India, and the Haemi Martyrdom Holy Ground together with the Seoul Pilgrimage Routes in South Korea. It is also the first Marian international shrine in Asia.

The solemn declaration of the shrine took place on January 26, 2024, six months behind its original plan by July 2023. In preparation for this event, a novena was held from January 17 to 25, led by the nine vicariates forane under the Diocese of Antipolo. On the day of the solemn declaration, the image of Our Lady of Peace and Good Voyage was first symbolically crowned by the Bishop of Antipolo, Ruperto Santos, beside Archbishop Charles John Brown, the Apostolic Nuncio to the Philippines. The coronation rites symbolized the cathedral's "new journey as an international shrine." A Mass was then held inside the shrine, presided by Archbishop Brown and concelebrated by 80 bishops comprising the CBCP, with the attendance of top government officials including First Lady Liza Marcos, wife of President Bongbong Marcos.

A Thanksgiving Mass (Misa de Gracia) was held on February 26, 2024, exactly a month after the solemn declaration, presided by the pro-prefect of the Dicastery for Evangelization, Archbishop Rino Fisichella. On the same day, the shrine received the Golden Rose from Pope Francis, making it the first Marian church in the Philippines and Asia to receive it.

== Gallery ==
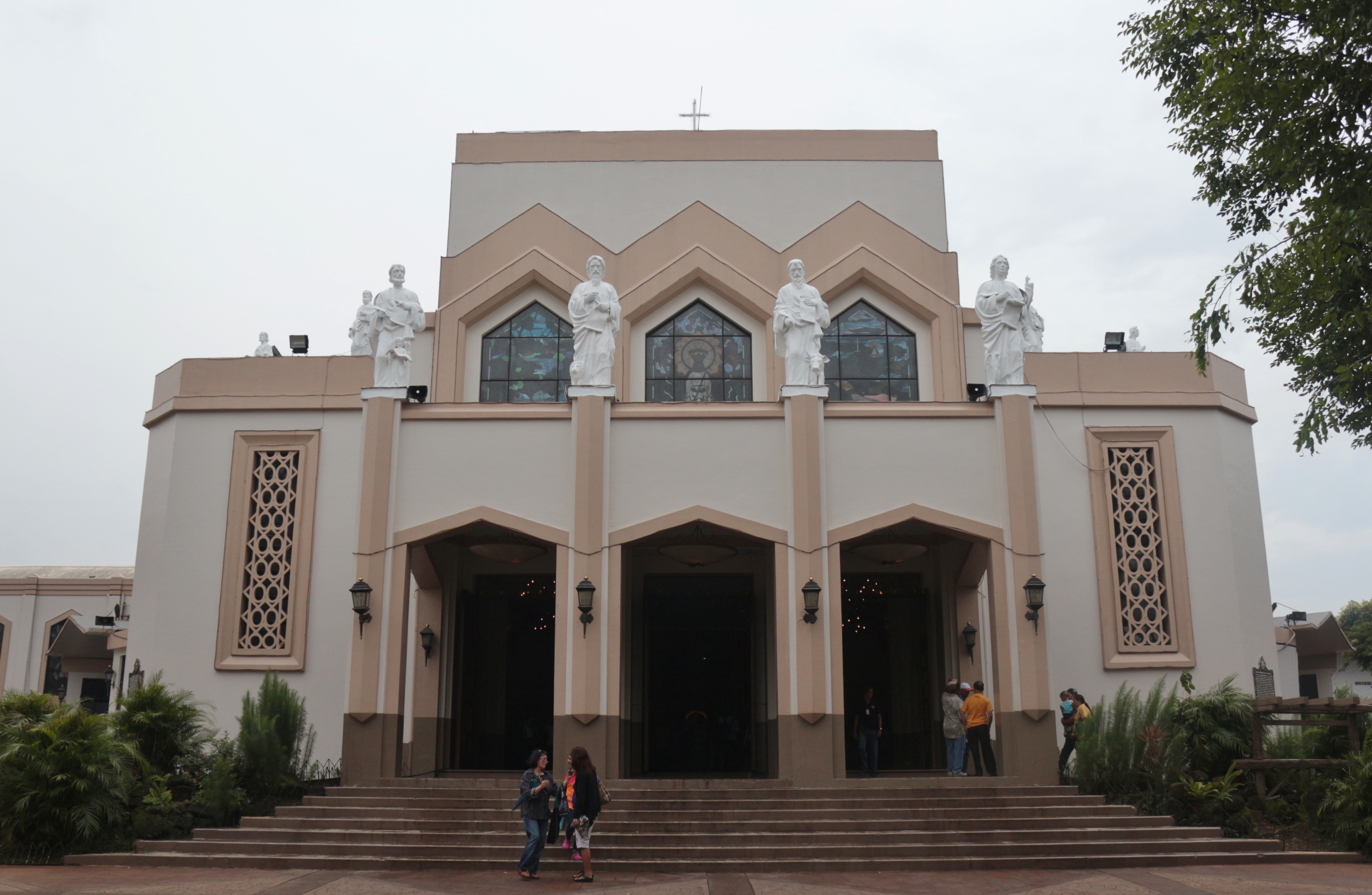
Antipolo Cathedral in 2014

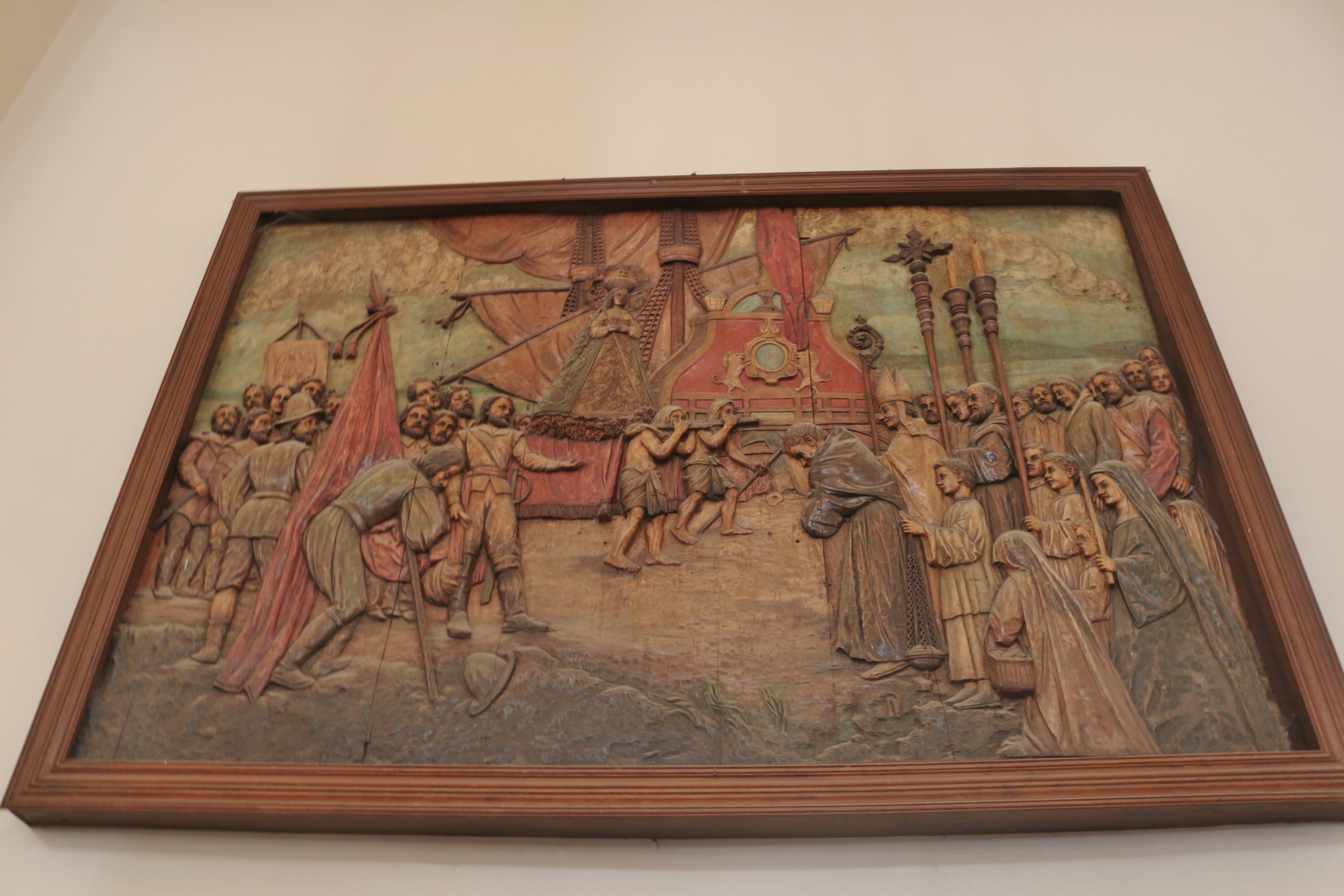
Bas-relief in painted wood depicting the first arrival of Our Lady of Peace and Good Voyage to the Philippines

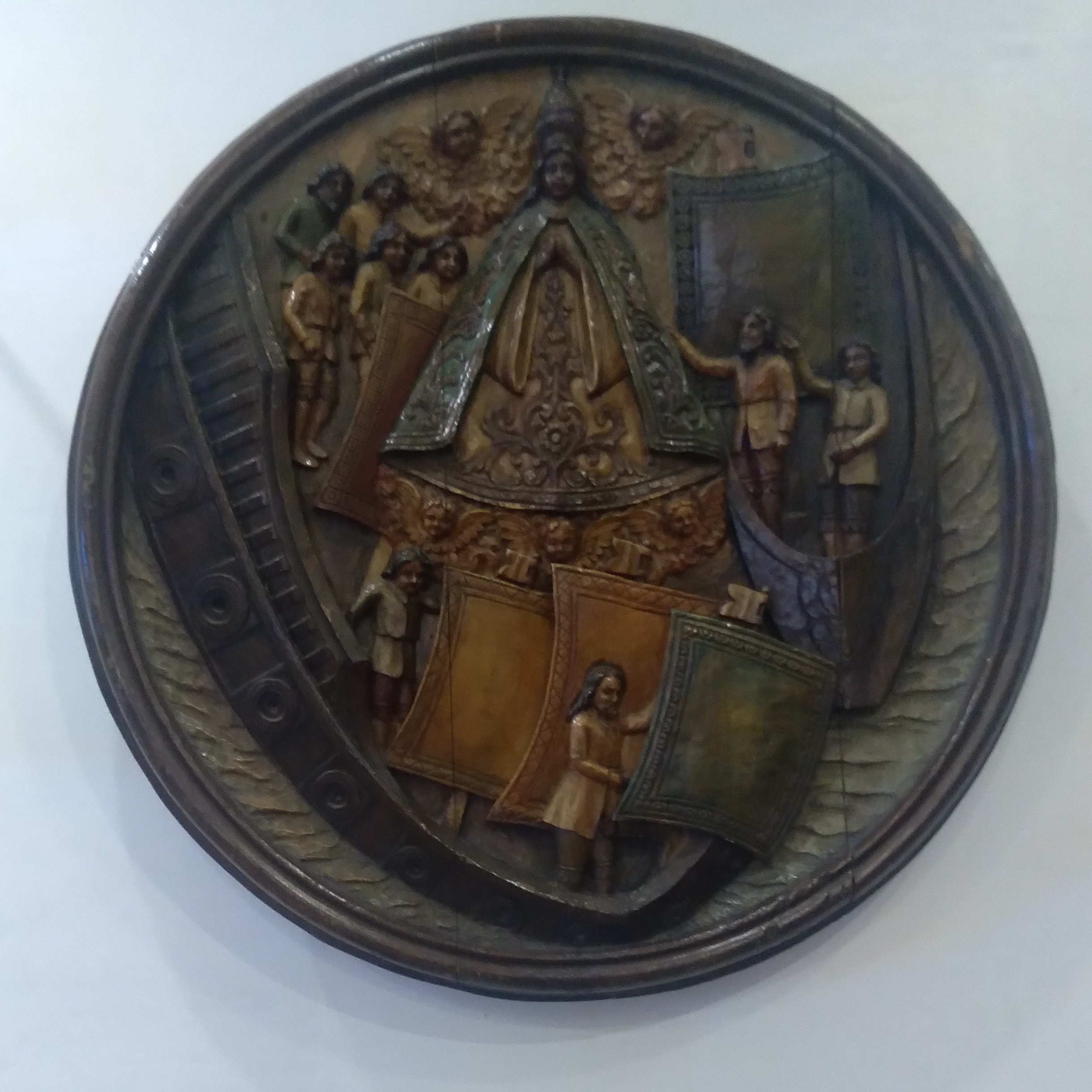
Krus by Bin Samonte

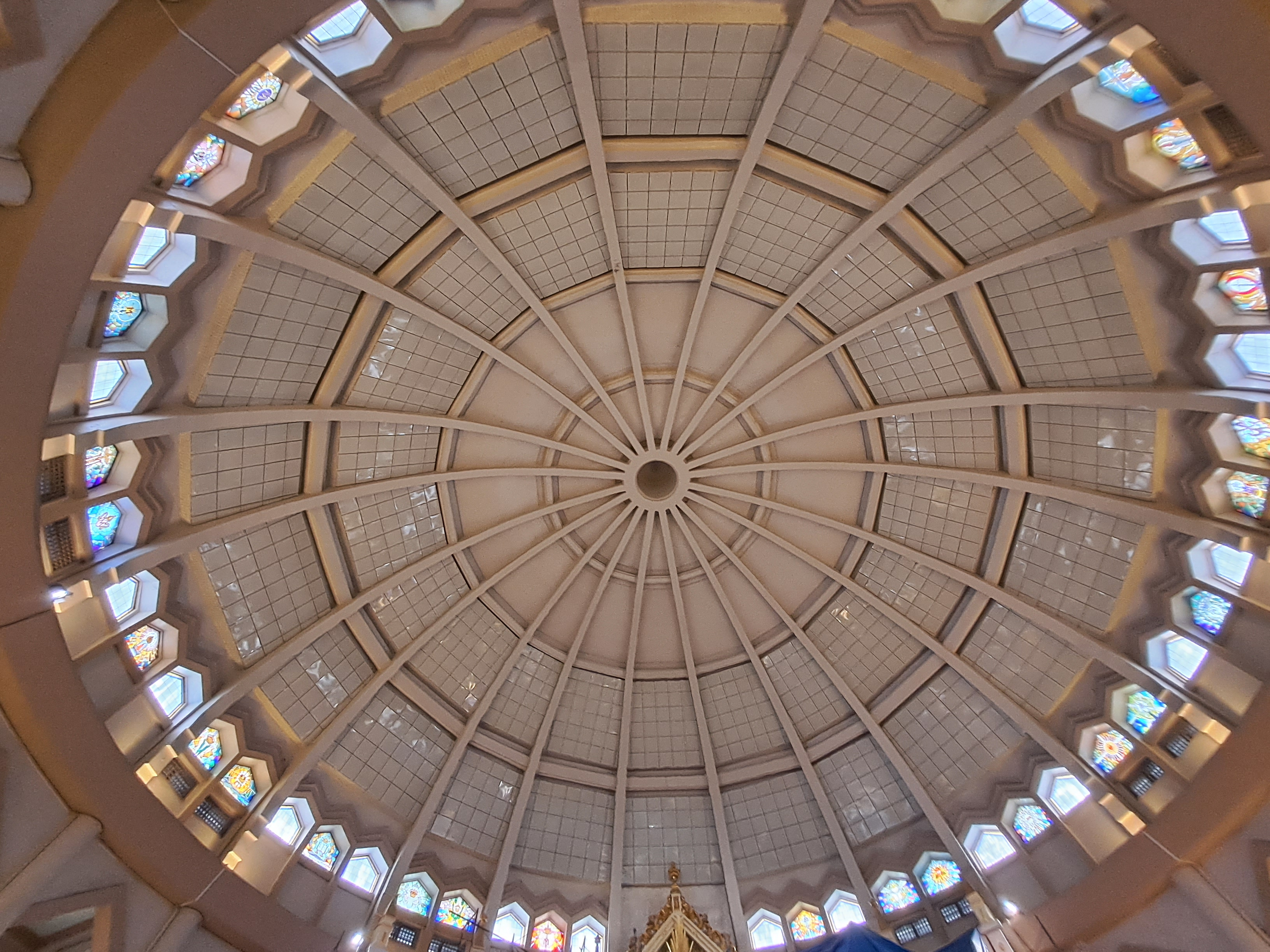
Dome interior, and clerestory windows

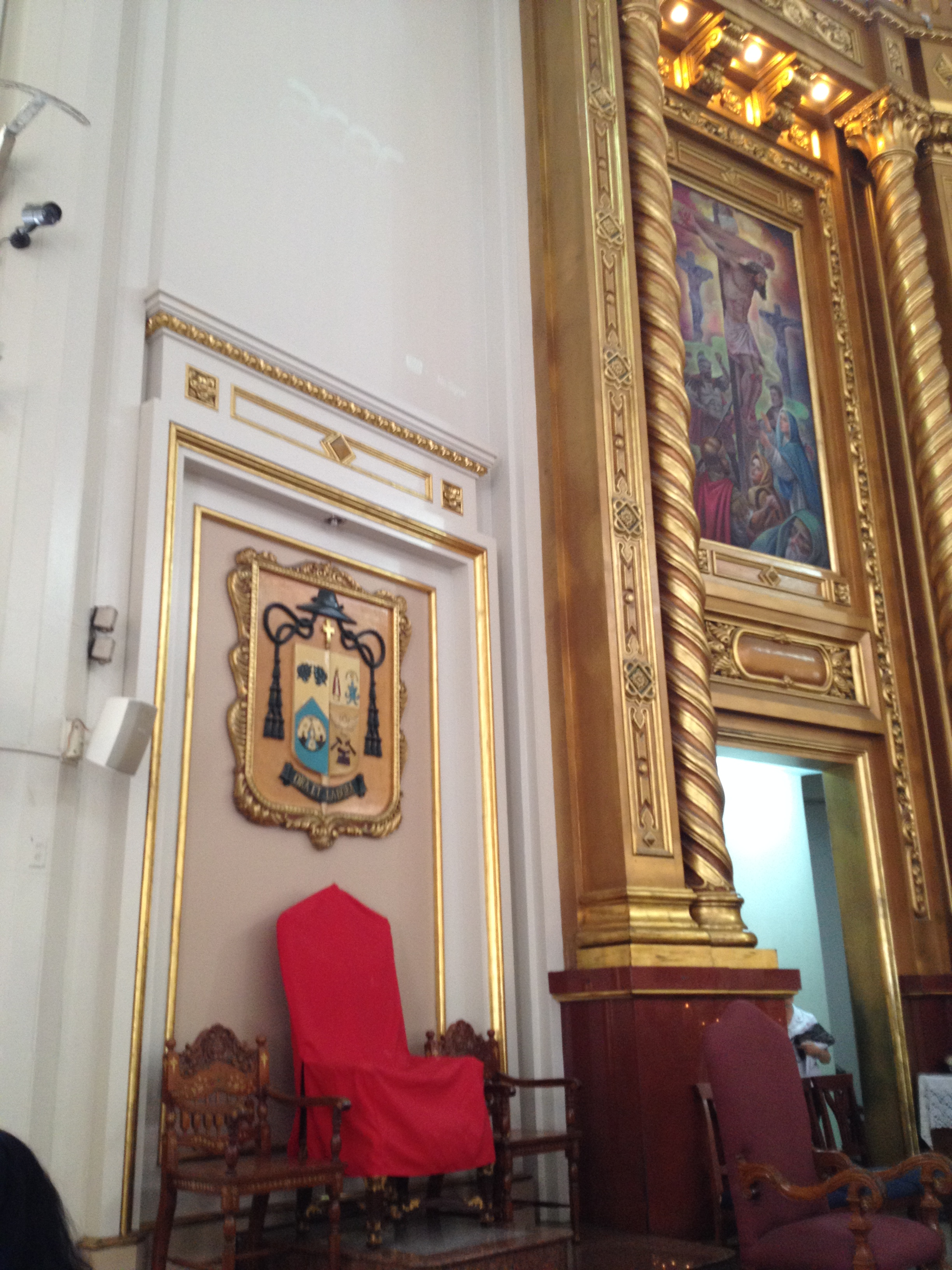
Cathedra of the Bishop of Antipolo

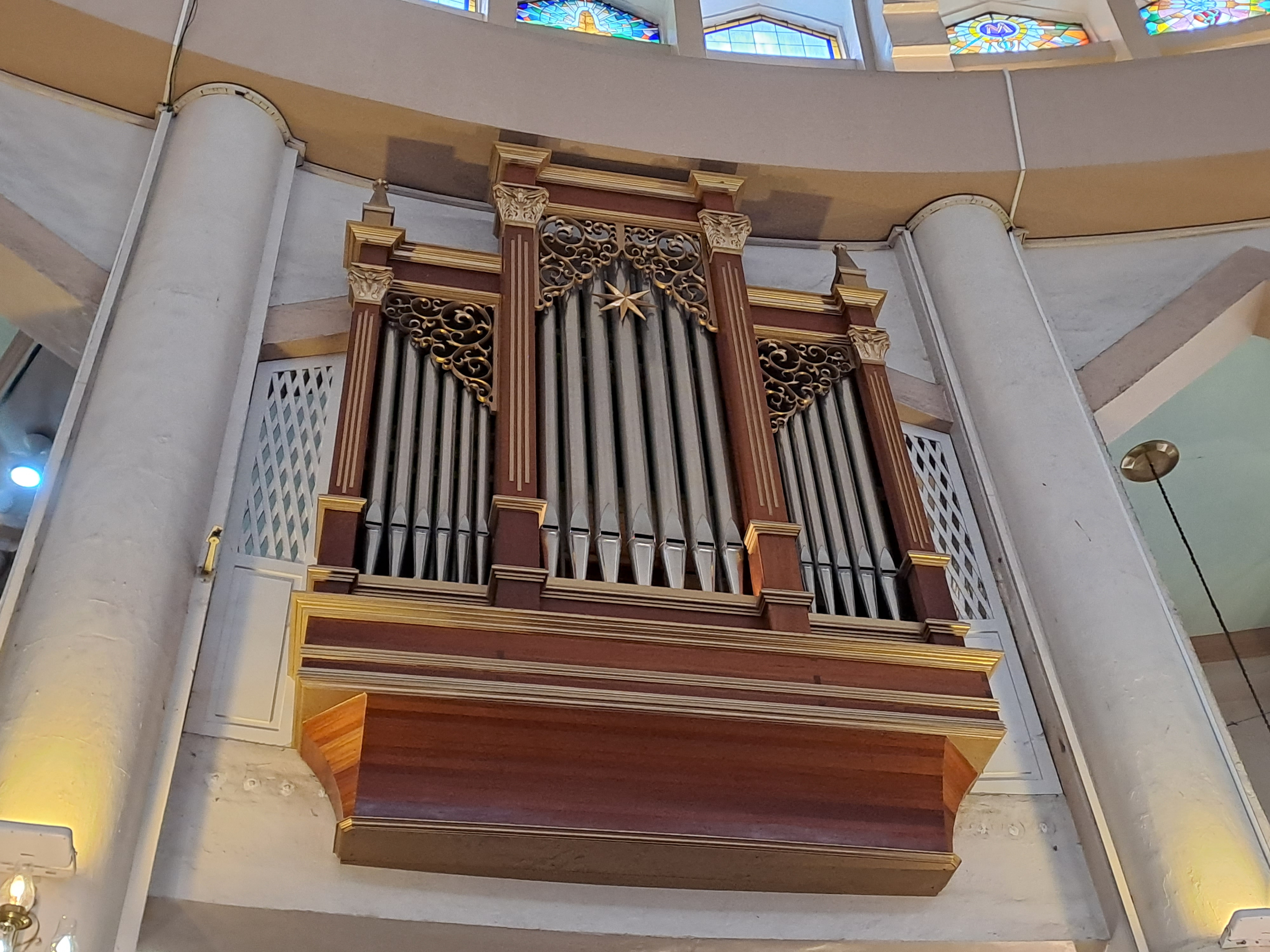
Pipe organ

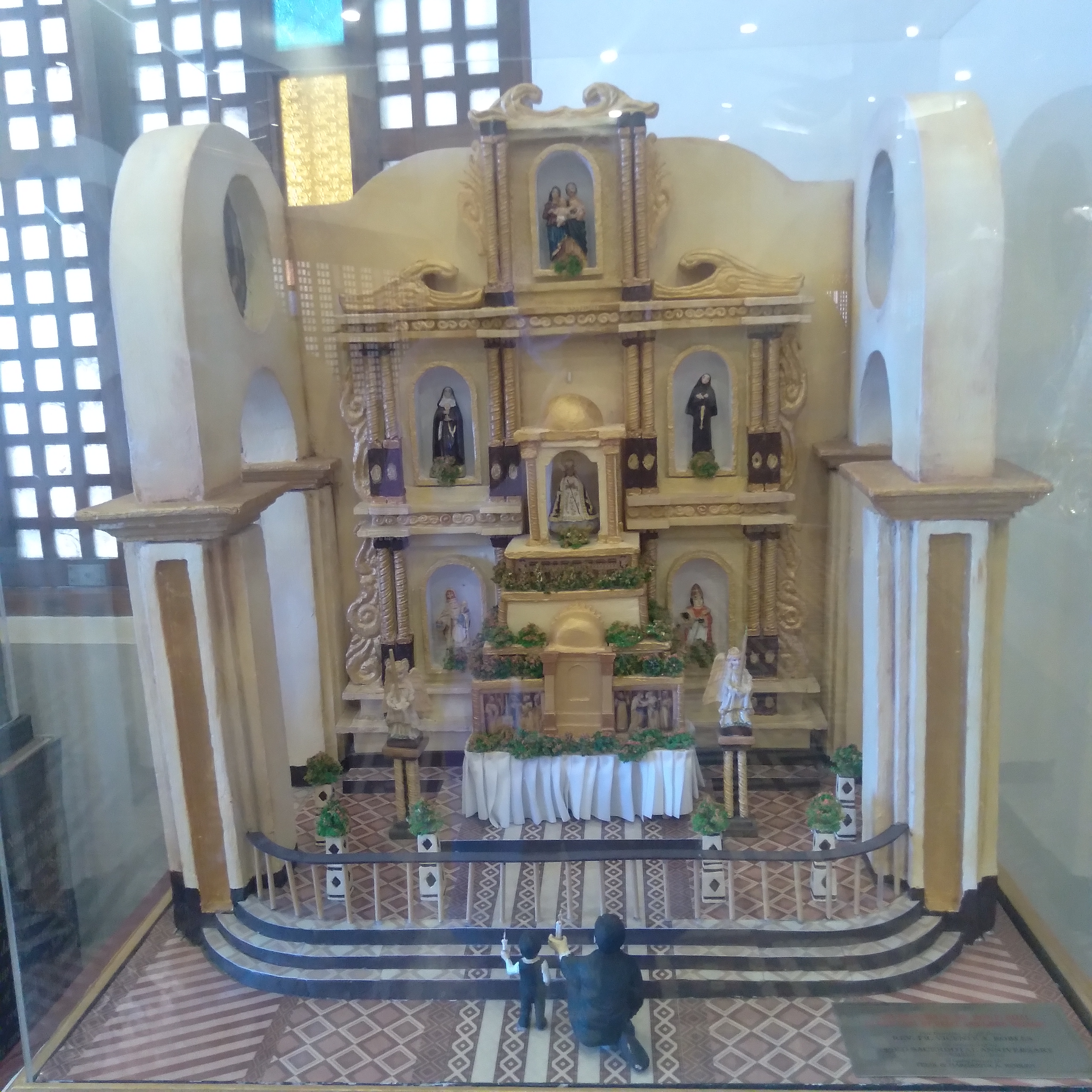
Diorama showing the original sanctuary before its destruction by bombing in 1945. It depicts the thanksgiving pilgrimage of a young José Rizal and his father Francisco Rizal Mercado, holding lit candles, on 6 June 1868.

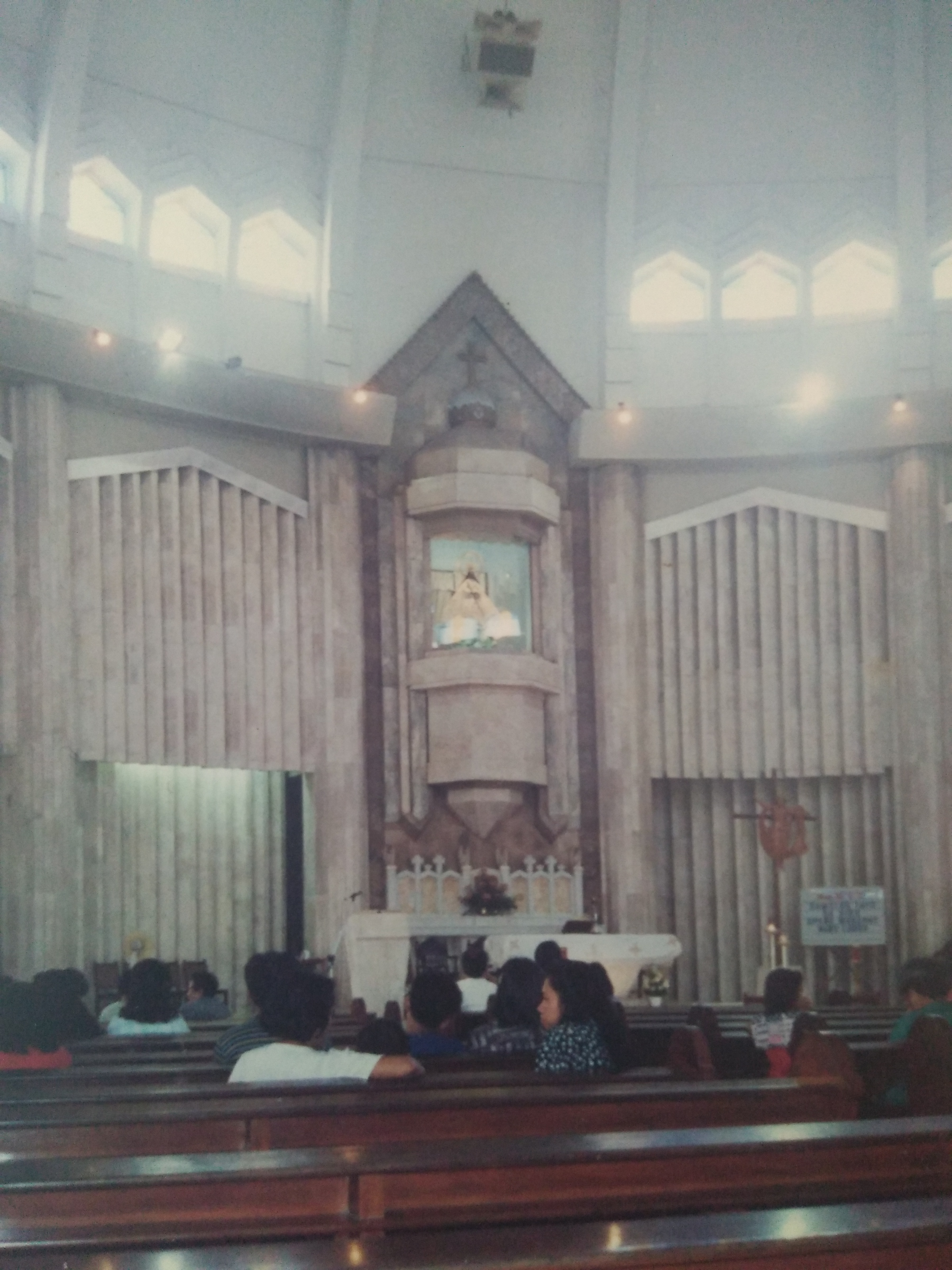
The plainer sanctuary with its many columns in 1994, before subsequent renovations.
