= National shrine =

Catholic designation of a sacred place

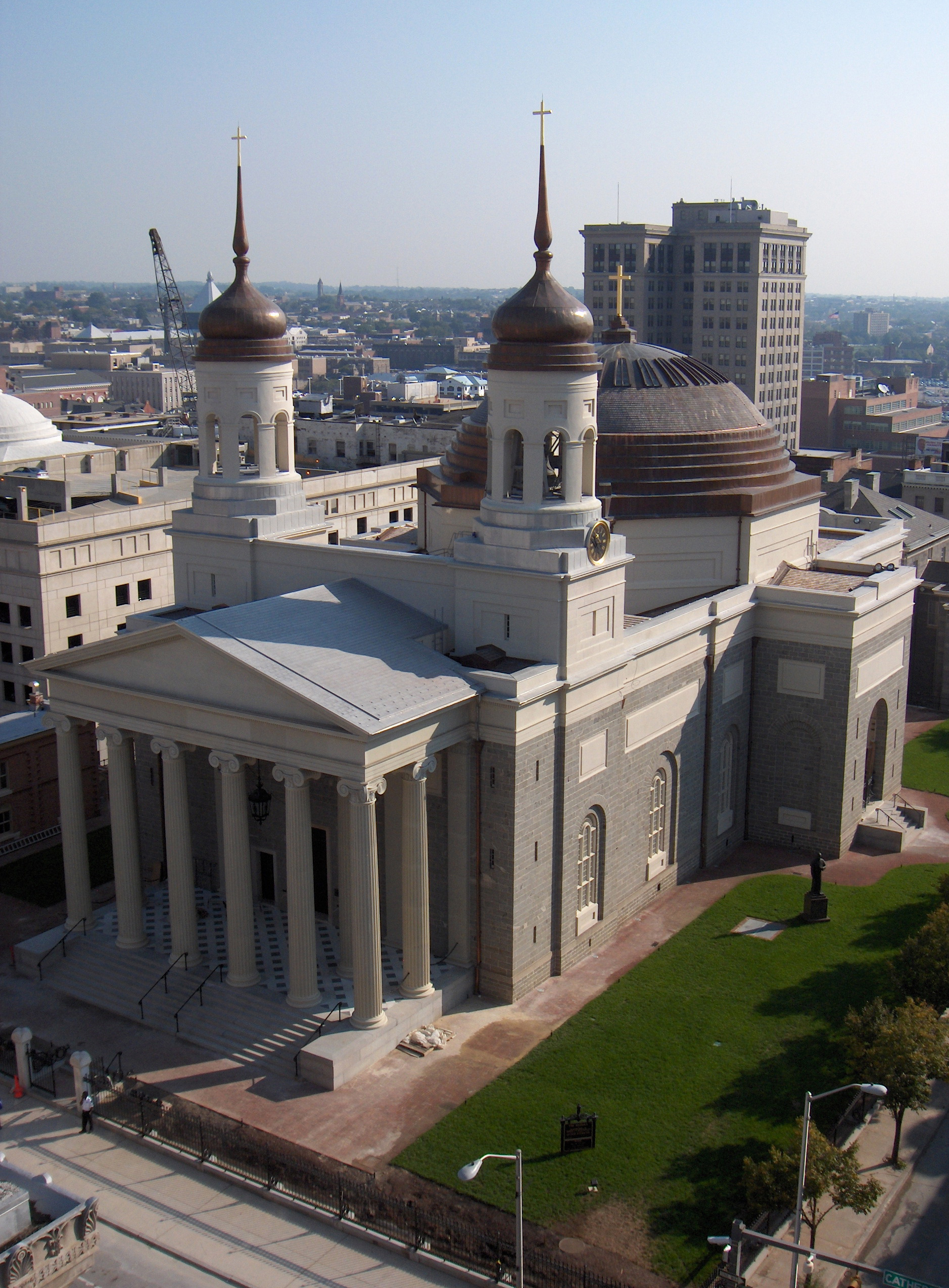
The Basilica of the National Shrine of the Assumption of the Blessed Virgin Mary, located in Baltimore, Maryland.

A national shrine is a Catholic church or other sacred place that has met certain requirements and is given this honor by the national episcopal conference to recognize the church's special cultural, historical, and religious significance.

== Process ==
For a church to receive the status of a national shrine involves a number of steps and certifications. It must first be designated as a diocesan (or archdiocesan) shrine, an honor conferred by the local bishop or archbishop. To be designated as a shrine, the subject church must be a place "to which numerous members of the faithful make pilgrimage for a special reason of piety." It must exceed other churches in terms of worship, Christian formation, and social services. When these requirements are met, the parish petitions the (arch)bishop to canonically elevate the church.

When devotion has grown, the (arch)diocesan shrine may petition the national Conference of Catholic Bishops. Evaluation by the nation's (arch)bishops involves considerations including canon law, liturgy, and doctrine.

Declaration of an international shrine is conferred by the Holy See similar to basilicas.

== International shrines ==
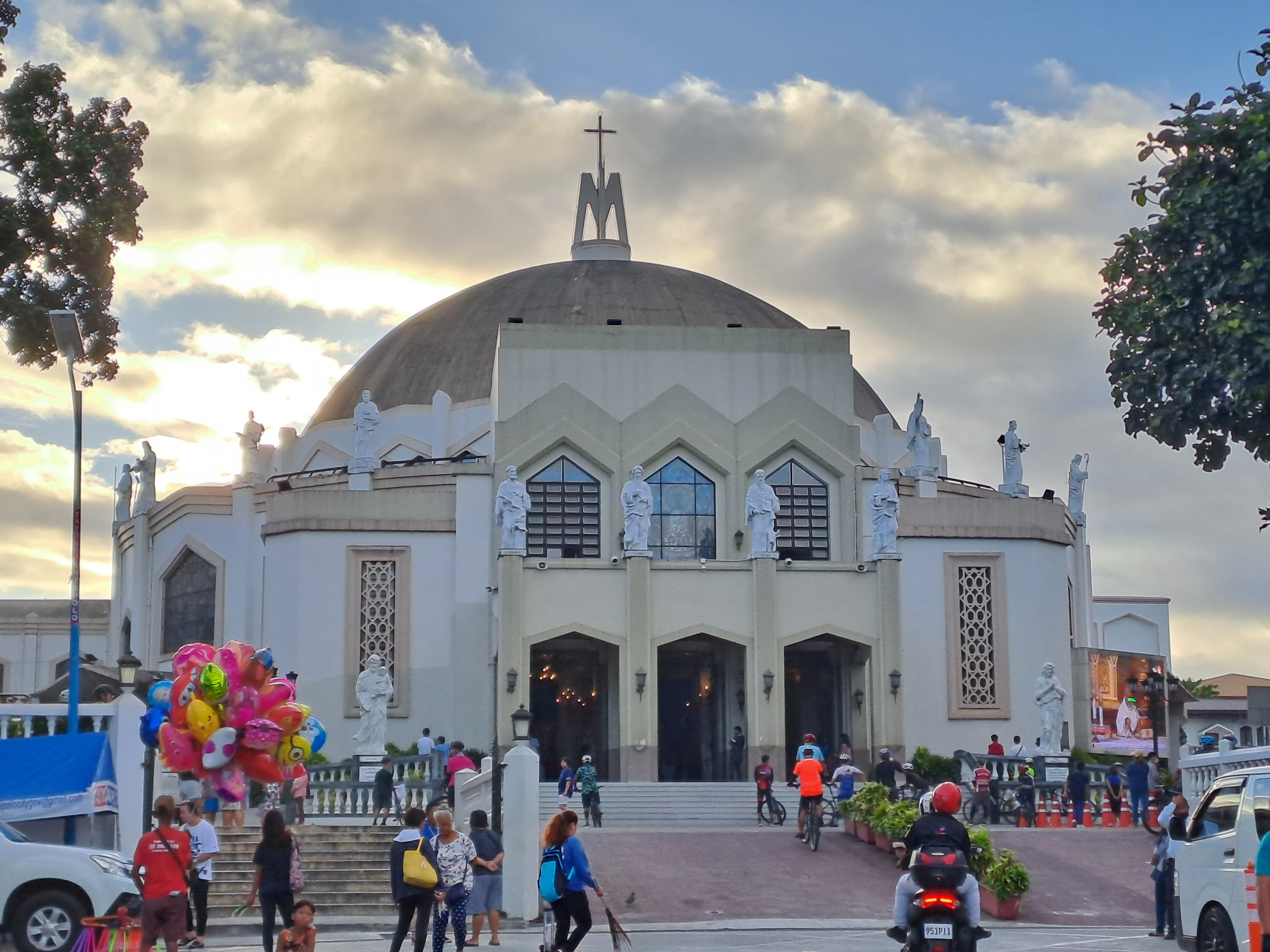
Antipolo Cathedral is one of the newest international shrines worldwide. It is home to the image of Our Lady of Peace and Good Voyage.

- Basilica of the Assumption, Aglona, Latvia
- Basilica della Santa Casa, Loreto, Italy
- Pontifical Basilica of Saint Anthony of Padua (Basilica Pontificia di Sant'Antonio di Padova), Padua, Italy
- Sanctuary Basilica of Our Lady of the Rosary (Fátima), Fátima, Portugal
- Basilica of the National Shrine of Our Lady of Knock, Knock, Ireland
- Sanctuary Shrine of Divine Mercy, Kraków, Poland
- International Shrine of Our Lady of Peace and Good Voyage, Antipolo, Philippines
- International Shrine of Saint Padre Pio, Santo Tomas, Philippines
- Shrine of Our Lady of Sorrows, Stary Wielisław, Poland
- St. Thomas Syro Malabar Catholic International Shrine, Malayattoor, India
- Sanctuary of Our Lady of Lourdes (Sanctuaire de Notre-Dame de Lourdes), Lourdes, France
- Seoul Catholic Pilgrimage Route of Jeoldu-San South Korea, recognized on 14 September 2018
- Haemi International Sanctuary, Seosan, South Korea; recognized on 29 November 2020
- International Sanctuary of Jesus the Saviour and Mother Mary, Elele, Nigeria

== National shrines listed by country ==
There are 230 national shrines in the world, as well as eleven international shrines.

=== Africa ===
There are four national shrines in Africa.

==== Democratic Republic of Congo ====
1. National Shine of Blessed Marie-Cleméntine Anuarite (Sanctuaire National Bienheureuse Anuarite), Isiro

==== Kenya ====
1. National Shrine of Our Lady of Africa, Village of Mary Mother of God, Subukia

==== Nigeria ====
1. National Shrine of Our Mother of Perpetual Help, Ugwogwo-Nike (Enugu)

==== Uganda ====
1. Basilica of the Uganda Martyrs, Namugongo

=== Asia ===
There are 46 national shrines in Asia.

==== China ====
1. National Shrine Basilica of Our Lady Mary Help of Christians, Sheshan (Shanghai)

==== East Timor ====
1. National Shrine of Our Lady of Aitara (Santuario Nacional Nossa Senhora de Aitara), Soibada

==== India ====
1. National Shrine Cathedral Basilica of Saint Thomas, Chennai
2. National Shrine Basilica of Our Lady of Ransom, Vallarpadam
3. Saint Thomas Mount National Shrine, Chennai

==== Japan ====
1. National Shrine of the Twenty-Six Martyrs of Japan, Nagasaki

==== Lebanon ====
1. Shrine of Our Lady of Lebanon (مزار سيدة لبنان; Sanctuaire Notre-Dame-du-Liban), Harissa

==== Pakistan ====
1. National Marian Shrine, Mariamabad

==== Philippines ====
Luzon

1. International Shrine of Our Lady of Peace and Good Voyage, Antipolo
2. Minor Basilica and National Shrine of Our Lady of Peñafrancia, Naga
3. Minor Basilica of the National Shrine of Our Lady of Mount Carmel, Quezon City
4. Minor Basilica and National Shrine of San Lorenzo Ruiz, Binondo
5. Minor Basilica and National Shrine of Jesus Nazareno, Manila
6. Minor Basilica and National Shrine of La Virgen Divina Pastora, Gapan
7. Minor Basilica and National Shrine of Mary Help of Christians Parish, Parañaque
8. National Shrine of Mary, Queen of Peace, Quezon City
9. National Shrine of Our Lady of Fatima, Valenzuela
10. National Shrine of Our Lady of Guadalupe, Makati
11. National Shrine of Our Lady of La Salette, Silang
12. National Shrine of Our Lady of Lourdes, Quezon City
13. National Shrine and Parish of Our Lady of Loreto, Manila
14. National Shrine of Our Lady of Sorrows, Dolores
15. National Shrine of Our Lady of the Abandoned, Manila
16. National Shrine of Our Lady of the Holy Rosary of La Naval de Manila, Quezon City
17. National Shrine of Our Lady of the Miraculous Medal, Muntinlupa
18. National Shrine of Our Lady of the Visitation of Guibang, Gamu
19. National Shrine of Our Mother of Perpetual Help, Parañaque
20. National Shrine of Saint Anne, Hagonoy
21. National Shrine of Saint Anthony of Padua, Pila
22. National Shrine of Saint Jude, Manila
23. National Shrine of Saint Michael and the Archangels, Manila
24. National Shrine of Saint Padre Pio, Santo Tomas
25. National Shrine of the Divine Mercy, Marilao
26. National Shrine of the Sacred Heart, Makati
27. National Shrine of Our Lady of Salambao, Obando
28. National Shrine and Parish of St. John Paul II, Bataan
29. National Shrine of Our Lady of Mercy, Novaliches
30. National Shrine of Our Lady of Aranzazu, San Mateo, Rizal
31. National Shrine of Our Lady of Loreto, Sampaloc, Manila
32. National Shrine of Mary, Queen of Peace, Quezon City

Visayas

1. National Shrine of Our Lady of the Candles (Metropolitan Cathedral of Saint Elizabeth of Hungary), Iloilo
2. National Shrine of Our Lady of the Rule, Lapu-Lapu
3. National Shrine of Saint Joseph, Mandaue
4. National Shrine and Cathedral Parish of Our Lady of the Assumption, Maasin

==== South Korea ====
1. National Shrine of Korean Martyrs at Jeoldu-san, Seoul

==== Sri Lanka ====
1. National Shrine of the Holy Cross, Marawila
2. Basilica of Our Lady of Lanka, Tewatta, Colombo
3. Shrine of Our Lady of Madhu, Madhu
4. National Shrine of St. Anne, Kalpitiya
5. National Shrine of St. Anne, Kattimahana, Udubaddawa
6. St. Anthony's Shrine, Kochchikade, Colombo

==== Taiwan ====
1. Wanchin Basilica of the Immaculate Conception, Wanluan
2. National Shrine of Our Lady of China, Meishan, Chiayi

==== Vietnam ====
1. Basilica of Our Lady of La Vang (Ðền thơ Đức Mẹ La Vang), La Vang

=== Europe ===
There are eight international shrines (listed above) and 38 national shrines in Europe.

==== Albania ====
1. Sanctuary of Our Lady of Good Counsel (Shenjtërorja e Zojës së Shkodrës), Shkodra

==== Austria ====
1. Basilica of the Birth of Mary (Basilika Mariä Geburt), Mariazell

==== Belarus ====
1. Basilica of Our Lady of the Assumption, Budslau

==== Belgium ====
1. Basilica of the Sacred Heart (Basilique Nationale du Sacré-Cœur), Koekelberg

==== Bulgaria ====
1. Our Lady of Lourdes Church, Plovdiv

==== Croatia ====
1. Basilica of Our Lady of Bistrica (Bazilika Majke Božje Bistričke), Marija Bistrica
2. National Shrine of Saint Joseph (Nacionalno Svetište sv. Josipa), Karlovac
3. National Shrine of Saint Nicolas Tavelic (Nacionalno svetište sv. Nikole Tavelića), Šibenik

==== Czechia ====
1. Cathedral of Saints Vitus, Wenceslaus and Adalbert (Katedrála sv. Víta, Václava a Vojtěcha), Prague

==== France ====
1. Basilica of Our Lady of the Immaculate Conception (Basilique Notre-Dame de l'Immaculée-Conception), Lourdes
2. Our Lady Help of Christians Church (Sanctuaire national Notre-Dame Auxiliatrice), Nice
3. Our Lady of Reims Cathedral (Cathédrale Notre-Dame de Reims), Reims

==== Germany ====
1. National Shrine of Our Lady of Altötting (Gnadenkapelle Altötting), Altötting

==== Hungary ====
1. Greek Catholic Basilica of Máriapócs (Görög Katolikus Máriapócs Nemzeti Kegytemplom), Máriapócs

==== Ireland ====
1. National Shrine of Saint Oliver Plunkett, Drogheda

==== Italy ====
1. National Shrine of Mary Mother and Queen, Contovello

==== Malta ====
1. Ta' Pinu Shrine, Għarb

==== Poland ====
1. Archcathedral Basilica of Bishop Saint Stanislaus and Martyr and Saint Wenceslaus (Bazylika Archikatedralna św. Stanisława Biskupa i męczennika i św. Wacława), Kraków
2. Jasna Góra Shrine Basilica of the Black Madonna (Bazylika Jasnogórska Wniebowzięcia NMP), Częstochowa
3. Basilica of the Immaculate Omni-mediatress of All Glories of Niepokalanów (Bazylika NMP Niepokalanej Wszechpośredniczki Łask w Niepokalanowie), Teresin
4. Sanctuary of Saint Jadwiga, Trzebnica
5. Sanctuary of Our Lady of Fatima, Zakopane - Krzeptówki

==== Portugal ====
1. National Shrine of Christ the King (Santuário Nacional de Cristo Rei), Almada
2. National Shrine of Our Lady of the Conception (Santuário Nacional de Nossa Senhora da Conceição), Vila Viçosa

==== Slovakia ====
1. Basilica of the Seven Sorrows of the Blessed Virgin Mary (Bazilika Sedembolestnej Panny Márie), Šaštín

==== Slovenia ====
1. Basilica of Mary Help of Christians (Bazilika Marije Pomagaj), Brezje

==== Spain ====
1. Royal Basilica of Our Lady of Atocha, Madrid
2. Basilica of Mary of God of Montserrat (Basílica de la Mare de Déu de Montserrat), Montserrat
3. National Shrine of the Great Promise (Santuario Nacional de la Gran Promesa), Valladolid

==== United Kingdom ====
===== England =====
1. National Shrine & Basilica of Our Lady of Walsingham, Little Walsingham
2. National Shrine of Our Lady of Willesden, London
3. National Shrine of Saint Jude, Faversham
4. National Shrine to St Joseph (Saint Michael's Abbey), Farnborough
5. National Shrine of St Boniface, Crediton

===== Scotland =====
1. Metropolitan Cathedral of Our Lady of the Assumption, Edinburgh
2. National Shrine of Our Lady of Lourdes, Carfin

===== Wales =====
1. Welsh National Shrine of Our Lady of the Taper, Cardigan
2. St Winefride's Well, Holywell

===== Gibraltar =====
1. National Shrine of Our Lady of Europe

=== North America ===
There are 101 national shrines in North America.

==== Canada ====
1. Basilica of Sainte-Anne-de-Beaupré (Basilique Sainte-Anne-de-Beaupré), Sainte-Anne-de-Beaupré
2. National Shrine of Canadian Martyrs, Midland
3. Basilica of Notre-Dame-du-Cap (Basilique Notre-Dame-du-Cap), Cap-de-la-Madeleine
4. Saint Anthony's Hermitage (Ermitage Saint-Antoine), Lac-Bouchette
5. The Bishop Velychkovsky Martyr's Shrine, Winnipeg
6. Saint Joseph's Oratory of Mount Royal (Oratoire Saint-Joseph du Mont-Royal), Montreal

==== Caribbean ====
===== Cuba =====
1. National Shrine of Jesus of Nazareth of Ransom (Santuario Nacional de Jesús Nazareno del Rescate), Havana
2. National Shrine Basilica of Our Lady of Charity of El Cobre (Basílica Santuario Nacional de Nuestra Señora de la Caridad del Cobre), El Cobre
3. National Shrine of Saint Barbara (Santuario Nacional de Santa Bárbara), Havana
4. Our Lady of Regla National Shrine (Santuario Nacional Nuestra Señora de Regla), Havana
5. Saint Lazarus National Shrine (Santuario Nacional San Lázaro), Havana

===== Dominican Republic =====
1. Our Lady of La Altagracia Cathedral Basilica (Basílica Catedral Nuestra Señora de la Altagracia), Higüey
2. Our Lady of Mercies National Shrine (Santuario Nacional Nuestra Señora de las Mercedes), La Vega
3. Holy Christ of Miracles National Shrine (Santuario Nacional Santo Cristo de los Milagros), Santo Domingo

===== Haiti =====
1. National Shrine of Our Lady of Perpetual Help (Sanctuaire Nationale de Notre-Dame du Perpetuel Secours), Port-au-Prince

==== Central America ====
===== Costa Rica =====
1. Holy Christ of Esquipulas National Shrine (Santuario Nacional Santo Cristo de Esquipulas), San José
2. Holy Christ of Esquipulas Shrine (Santuario Santo Cristo de Esquipulas), Santa Cruz

===== El Salvador =====
1. Queen of Peace Basilica Cathedral (Catedral Basílica Reina de la Paz), San Miguel

===== Guatemala =====
1. Basilica of Our Lady of the Rosary (Basílica de Nuestra Señora del Rosario), Guatemala City
2. Church of Saint Francis the Great (Iglesia de San Francisco el Grande), Guatemala City
3. Basilica of the Black Christ of Esquipulas (Basílica del Cristo Negro de Esquipulas), Esquipulas

===== Honduras =====
1. Basilica of Our Lady of Suyapa (Basílica de Nuestra Señora de Suyapa), Tegucigalpa

===== Nicaragua =====
1. National Shrine of Our Lady of Cuapa (Santuario Nacional Nuestra Señora de Cuapa), Cuapa
2. National Shrine Basilica of Our Lady of the Immaculate Conception (Santuario Nacional Basílica de Nuestra Señora de la Inmaculada Concepción), El Viejo

===== Panama =====
1. National Shrine of the Immaculate Heart of Mary (Santuario Nacional del Corazón de María), Panama City

==== Mexico ====
1. Distinguished and National Basilica of Saint Mary of Guadalupe (Insigne y Nacional Basílica de Santa María de Guadalupe), Mexico City
2. Old Basilica of Our Lady of Guadalupe (Antigua Basílica de Nuestra Señora de Guadalupe), Mexico City

==== United States ====
There are 72 national shrines in the United States.

===== Alaska =====
1. National Shrine of Saint Thérèse, Juneau

===== California =====
1. National Shrine of Our Lady of Guadalupe (Santuario Nacional de Nuestra Señora de Guadalupe), Sacramento
2. National Shrine of Saint Francis of Assisi, San Francisco
3. Mission Basilica and National Shrine of Saint John of Capestrano (Misión Basílica San Juan Capistrano), San Juan Capistrano

===== District of Columbia =====
1. Basilica of the National Shrine of the Immaculate Conception (Basílica del Santuario Nacional de la Inmaculada Concepción), Washington, D.C.
2. Saint John Paul II National Shrine, Washington, D.C.
3. Ukrainian National Shrine of the Holy Family, Washington, D.C.

===== Florida =====
1. Hermitage of Charity of El Cobre (Ermita de la Caridad del Cobre), Miami
2. Basilica of the National Shrine of Mary Queen of the Universe, Orlando
3. National Shrine of Our Lady of La Leche, St. Augustine

===== Illinois =====
1. National Shrine of Mary Immaculate Queen of the Universe, Lombard
2. National Shrine of Our Lady of the Snows, Belleville
3. National Shrine of Saint Ann, Chicago
4. National Shrine of Saint Frances Xavier Cabrini, Chicago
5. National Shrine of Saint Jude, Chicago
6. National Shrine of Saint Maximilian Kolbe, Libertyville
7. National Shrine of Saint Peregrine (Basilica of Our Lady of Sorrows), Chicago
8. National Shrine of Saint Therese, Darien
9. National Shrine of the Poor Souls, Berwyn

===== Indiana =====
1. National Shrine of Our Lady of Providence, Saint Mary-of-the-Woods

===== Louisiana =====
1. National Shrine of Blessed Francis Xavier Seelos, New Orleans
2. National Shrine of Saint Ann, Metairie
3. National Votive Shrine of Our Lady of Prompt Succor, New Orleans

===== Maryland =====
1. National Shrine Basilica of Saint Elizabeth Ann Seton, Emmitsburg
2. Basilica of the National Shrine of the Assumption of the Blessed Virgin Mary, Baltimore
3. National Shrine Grotto of Our Lady of Lourdes, Emmitsburg
4. National Shrine of Saint Alphonsus Liguori, Baltimore

===== Massachusetts =====
1. Madonna Queen of the Universe National Shrine, Boston
2. National Shrine of The Divine Mercy, Stockbridge
3. National Shrine of Our Lady of La Salette, Attleboro

===== Michigan =====
1. National Shrine of the Cross in the Woods, Indian River
2. National Shrine of the Little Flower Basilica, Royal Oak

===== Minnesota =====
1. National Shrine of Saint Odilia, Onamia
2. National Shrine Cathedral of the Apostle Paul, Saint Paul

===== Missouri =====
1. The National Shrine of Mary, Mother of the Church, Laurie
2. National Shrine of Our Lady of the Miraculous Medal, Perryville

===== New Jersey =====
1. National Shrine of Jesus of Great Power (Santuario Nacional de Jesús del Gran Poder), Newark
2. National Shrine of Our Lady of the Highway, Little Falls
3. National Shrine of Saint Gerard, Newark

===== New York =====
1. National Shrine Basilica of Our Lady of Fatima, Lewiston
2. National Shrine of Mary Help of Christians, Stony Point
3. National Shrine of Our Lady of Martyrs, Auriesville
4. National Shrine of Our Lady of Mount Carmel, Middletown
5. National Shrine of Saint Gennaro, New York City
6. National Shrine of Saint Kateri Tekakwitha, Fonda
7. National Shrine of Saint Vincent Ferrer, New York City
8. National Shrine of the Little Flower of Jesus, Buffalo
9. Our Lady of Victory Basilica and National Shrine, Lackawanna
10. Saint Ann's Armenian Shrine Cathedral, Brooklyn

===== Ohio =====
1. Basilica and National Shrine of Our Lady of Consolation, Carey
2. Basilica and National Shrine of Our Lady of Lebanon, North Jackson
3. National Shrine of Our Lady of Lourdes, Euclid
4. National Shrine of Saint Anthony, Cincinnati
5. National Shrine of Saint Dymphna, Massillon
6. National Shrine of the Holy Relics, Maria Stein

===== Oklahoma =====
1. National Shrine of the Infant Jesus of Prague, Prague

===== Oregon =====
1. National Sanctuary of Our Sorrowful Mother, Portland

===== Pennsylvania =====
1. National Shrine of Our Lady of Guadalupe Mother of the Americas, Allentown
2. National Shrine of Our Lady of Czestochowa, Doylestown
3. Basilica of the National Shrine of Saint Ann, Scranton
4. National Shrine of Saint John Neumann, Philadelphia
5. National Shrine of Saint Rita of Cascia, Philadelphia

===== Puerto Rico =====
1. Metropolitan Cathedral Basilica of Saint John the Baptist (Catedral Metropolitana Basílica de San Juan Bautista), San Juan Antiguo
2. National Shrine of Our Lady Mother of Divine Providence (Santuario Nacional de Nuestra Señora Madre de la Divina Providencia), Cupey

===== Tennessee =====
1. National Shrine of Saint Martin de Porres, Memphis

===== Texas =====
1. Basilica of the National Shrine of Our Lady of San Juan del Valle, San Juan
2. Basilica of the National Shrine of the Little Flower, San Antonio

===== Virginia =====
1. National Shrine of Our Lady of Walsingham, Williamsburg

===== Wisconsin =====
1. Basilica and National Shrine of Mary, Help of Christians at the Holy Hill, Hubertus
2. National Shrine of Our Lady of Good Help, Champion
3. National Shrine of Saint Joseph, De Pere

=== Oceania ===
There are five national shrines in Oceania.

==== Australia ====
1. National Shrine of Our Lady of Mount Carmel, Middle Park, Victoria
2. National Shrine of Saint Anthony, Hawthorn, Victoria
3. National Shrine of Saint Thérèse of Lisieux, Kew, Victoria
4. Saint Mary's Cathedral, Sydney

==== New Zealand ====
1. St Mary of the Angels, Wellington

=== South America ===
There are 35 national shrines in South America.

==== Argentina ====
1. National Basilica of Our Lady of Luján (Basílica Nacional de Nuestra Señora de Luján), Luján, Buenos Aires
2. National Shrine of Schoenstatt (Santuario Nacional de Schoenstatt), Florencio Varela, Buenos Aires
3. Basilica of Saint Rose of Lima (Basílica Santuario de Santa Rosa de Lima), Buenos Aires

==== Brazil ====
1. National Shrine Basilica Cathedral of Our Lady Aparecida (Catedral Basílica do Santuário Nacional de Nossa Senhora Aparecida), Aparecida
2. National Shrine of Our Lady of Loreto (Santuário Nacional de Nossa Senhora de Loreto ), Rio de Janeiro
3. National Shrine of Saint Joseph of Anchieta (Santuário Nacional do São José de Anchieta), Anchieta, Espírito Santo
4. National Shrine of the Holy Head (Santuário Nacional de Santa Cabeça), Cachoeira Paulista
5. National Shrine of the Sacred Heart of Jesus (Santuário Nacional do Sagrado Coração de Jesus), Itu, São Paulo
6. Basilica of Our Lady of Penha (Basílica Santuário de Nossa Senhora da Penha), Rio de Janeiro

==== Chile ====
1. National Sanctuary of Maipú (Santuario Nacional or Templo Votivo de Maipú), Maipú, Santiago

==== Colombia ====
1. National Shrine of Our Lady of Mount Carmel (Santuario Nacional de Nuestra Señora del Carmen), Bogotá
2. Basilica of Our Lady of the Rosary of Chiquinquirá (Basílica de Nuestra Señora del Rosario de Chiquinquirá), Chiquinquirá
3. National Shrine Basilica of Our Lady of Las Lajas (Basílica Santuario Nacional de Nuestra Señora de Las Lajas), Las Lajas

==== Ecuador ====
1. National Shrine of Our Lady Mary Nativity of El Guayco (Santuario Nacional de Nuestra Señora María Natividad del Guayco), La Magdalena
2. National Shrine of Our Lady of El Cisne (Santuario Nacional de Nuestra Señora del Cisne), El Cisne
3. National Shrine of Our Lady of the Grotto of La Paz (Santuario Nacional de Nuestra Señora de la Gruta de La Paz), La Paz
4. National Shrine of Our Lady of the Presentation of El Quinche (Santuario Nacional de Nuestra Señora de la Presentación del Quinche), El Quinche
5. Divine Mercy Sanctuary (Santuario Nacional de la Divina Misericordia), Guayaquil
6. Basílica del Voto Nacional a.k.a. Sacred Heart of Jesus Patron of Ecuador Basilica (Basílica Sagrado Corazón de Jesús, Patrono del Ecuador), Quito
7. Saint Narcisa de Jesús National Shrine (Santuario Nacional Santa Narcisa de Jesús), Nobol

==== Paraguay ====
1. National Shrine of Our Lady of Perpetual Help (Santuario Nacional de Nuestra Señora del Perpetuo Socorro), Asunción
2. National Shrine of the Sacred Heart of Jesus (Asunción) (Santuario Nacional del Sagrado Corazón de Jesús), Asunción
3. Cathedral Basilica of Our Lady of Miracles (Catedral Basílica Nuestra Señora de los Milagros), Caacupé

==== Peru ====
1. Saint Peter's Basilica (Basílica San Pedro), Lima
2. National Shrine of St. Rosa of Lima (Santuario de Santa Rosa de Lima), Lima

==== Trinidad and Tobago ====
1. National Shrine of Our Lady of Laventille, Port of Spain
2. Shrine of the Rosary, Port of Spain

==== Uruguay ====
1. Basilica Cathedral and National Shrine of San José de Mayo (Catedral Basílica de San José de Mayo), San José de Mayo
2. National Shrine of Mary Help of Christians (Santuario Nacional María Auxiliadora), Montevideo
3. National Shrine of the Grotto of Lourdes (Santuario Nacional de la Gruta de Lourdes), Montevideo
4. National Shrine of the Sacred Heart (Santuario Nacional del Sagrado Corazón), Montevideo
5. National Shrine of the Virgin of the Thirty-Three at the Basilica Cathedral of Our Lady of Luján (Santuario Nacional de la Virgen de los Treinta y Tres), Florida

==== Venezuela ====
1. Our Lady of Coromoto Cathedral Basilica (Basílica Catedral Nuestra Señora de Coromoto), Guanare
2. Our Lady of Coromoto National Shrine Basilica (Basílica Santuario Nacional Nuestra Señora de Coromoto), San Genaro de Boconoíto
3. Shrine Basilica of Santa Capilla (Basílica Santuario de Santa Capilla), Caracas
