= Shrine of Our Lady of Sorrows in Stary Wielisław =

Roman Catholic Church in Poland

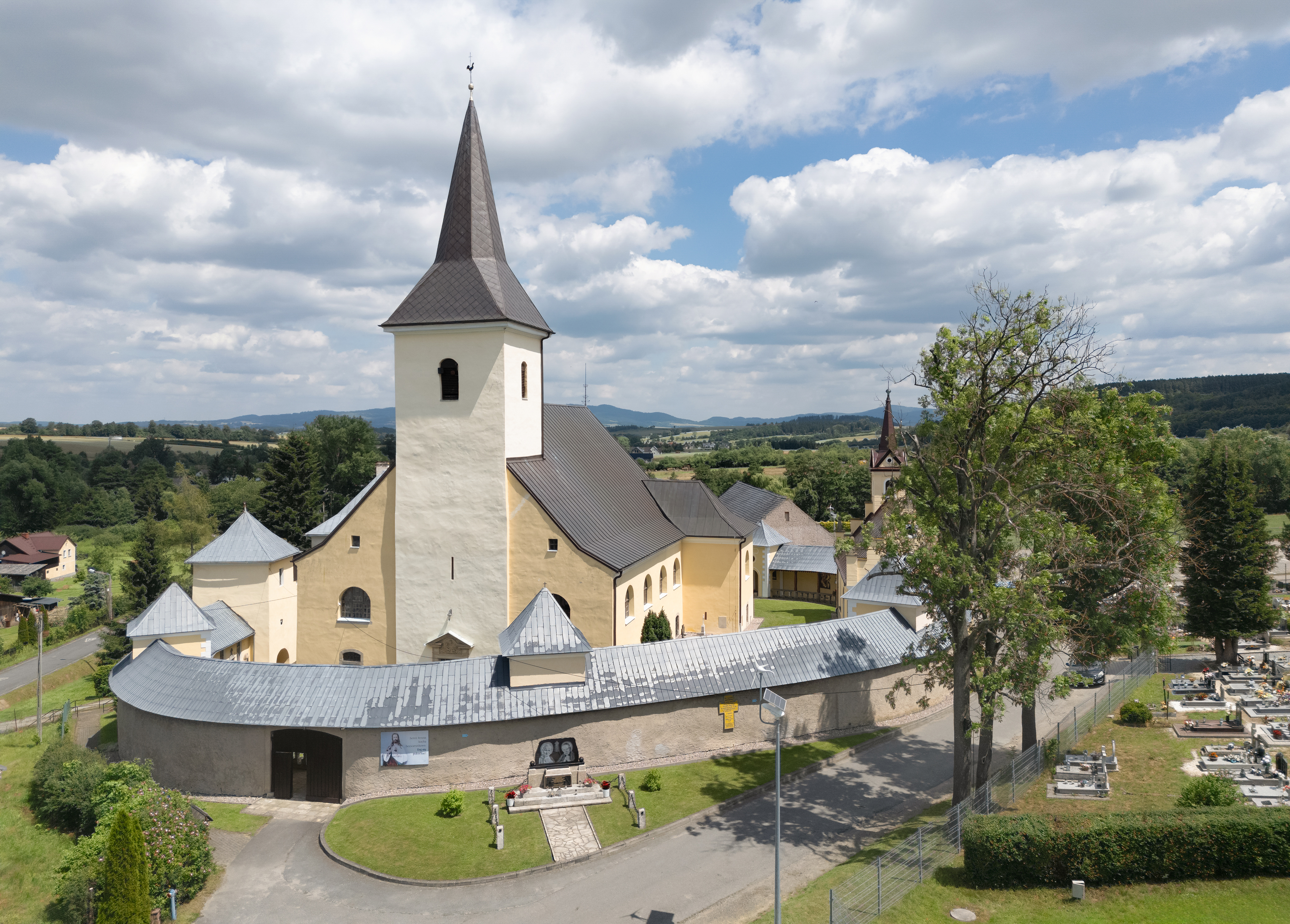
Shrine of Our Lady of Sorrows in Stary Wielislaw

The Shrine of Our Lady of Sorrows is a church in the village of Stary Wielisław, Poland.

The church's history goes back to the 10th century, though the current structure dates only to the 15th.

It is one of eight International shrines of the Roman Catholic Church.

The Church possesses relics of the Holy Cross and of St. Catherine of Alexandria and replicas of nails from Jesus' cross.

Also venerated here, since 22 October 2011, are relics of St. John Paul II.
