= Haemi International Sanctuary =

Coordinates: 36°42′47.26″N 126°32′15.46″E

- 해미국제성지
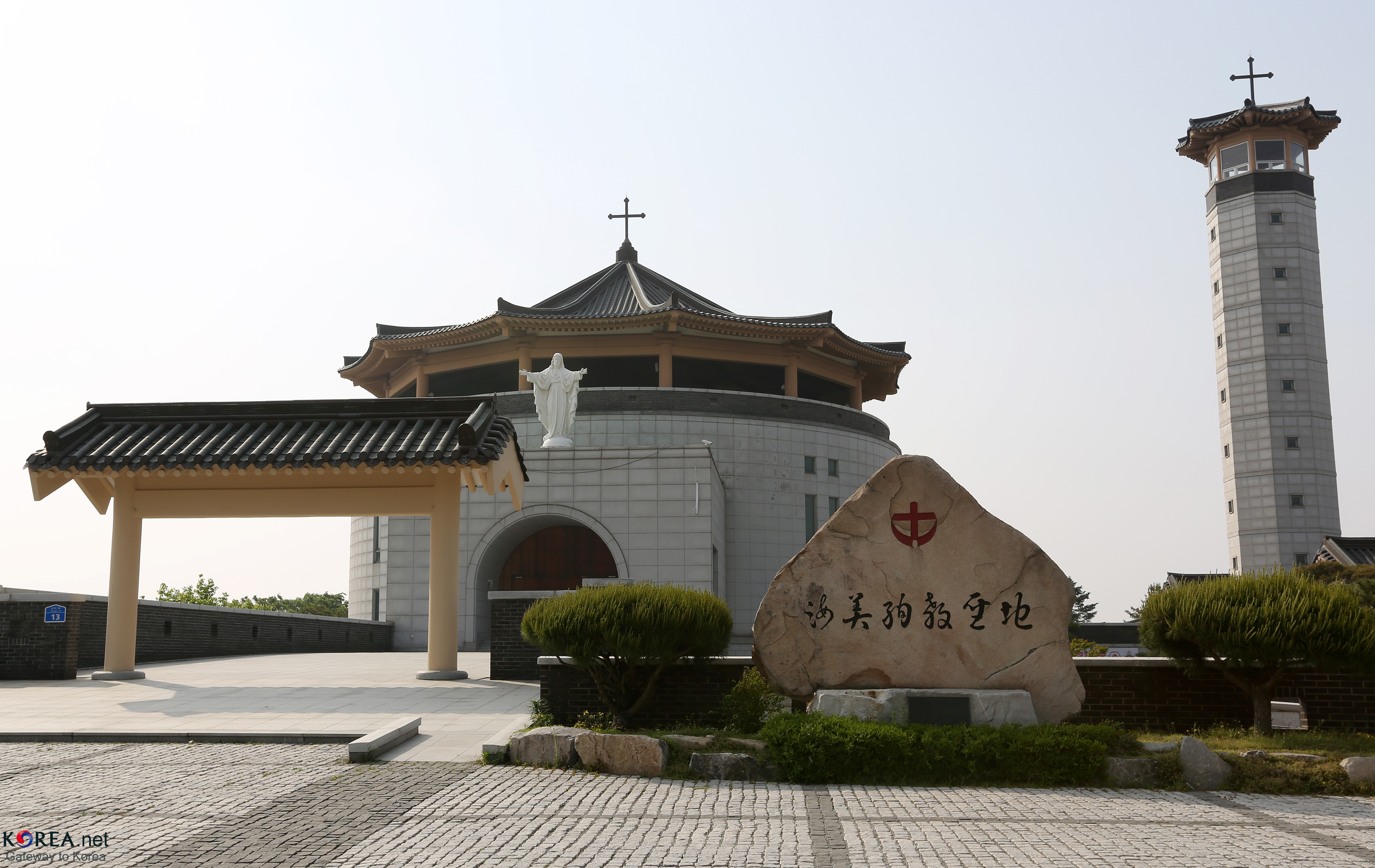
- Haemi International Sanctuary
- Address: 13, Seongji 1-ro, Haemi-myeon, Seosan-si, Chungcheongnam-do
- Country: South Korea
- Denomination: Roman Catholic Church
- Website: www.haemi.or.kr

History
- Founded: June 17, 2003

Administration
- Province: Ecclesiastical Province of Seoul
- Diocese: Roman Catholic Diocese of Daejeon

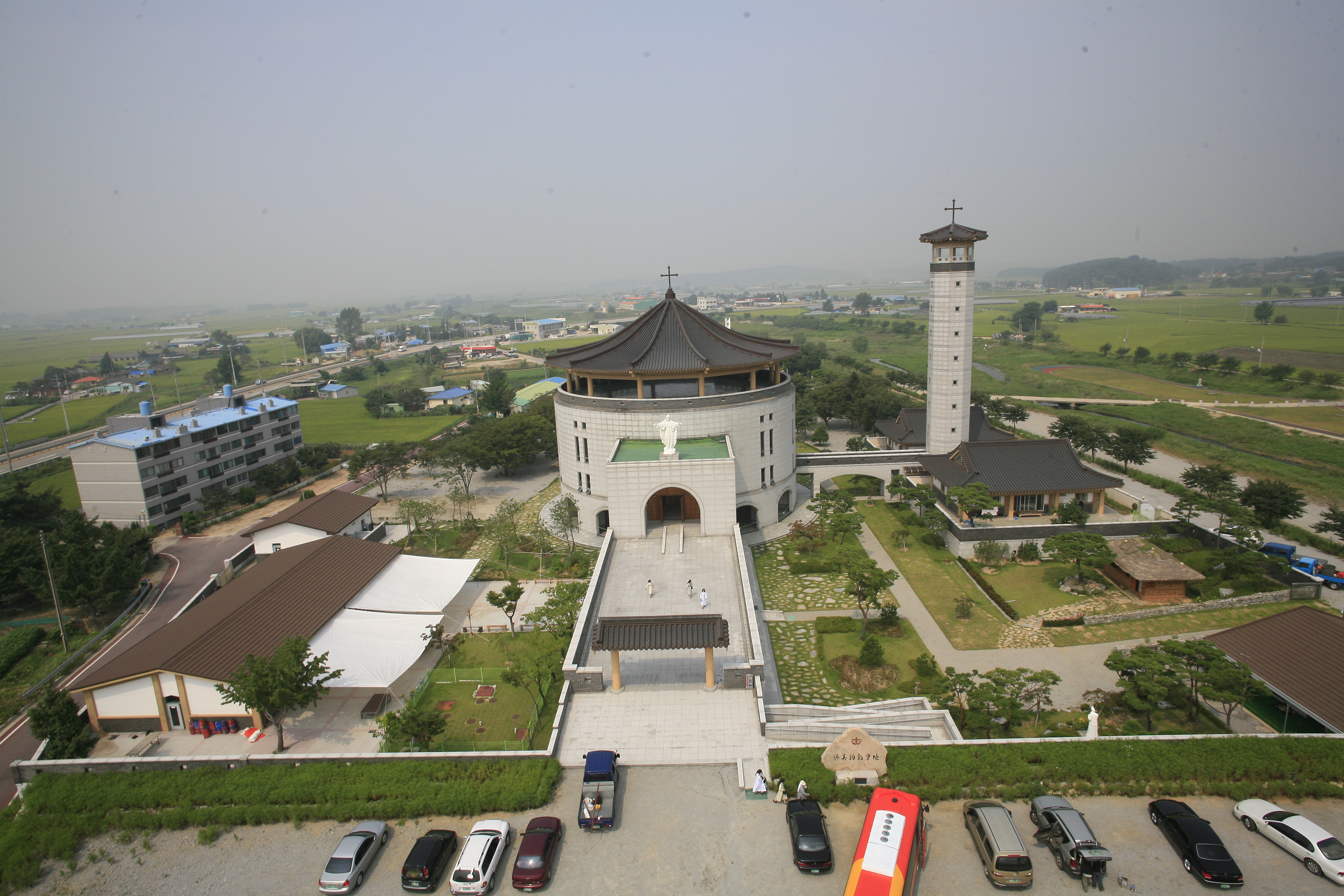
Panoramic view of the Haemi International Sanctuary

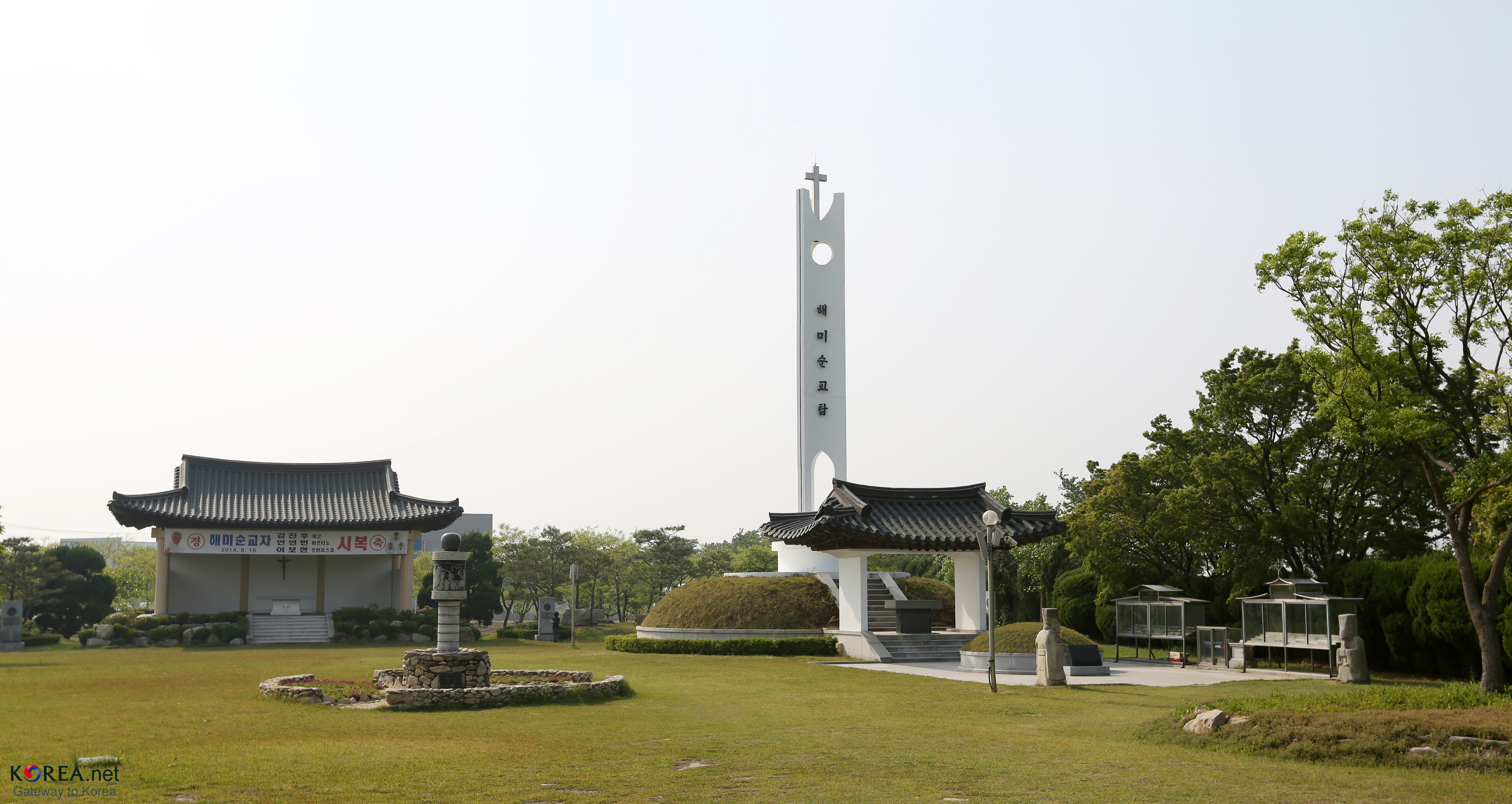
The open-air church and the Haemi Martyrdom Tower

The Haemi International Sanctuary (Korean: 해미국제성지; Latin: Haemi Sanctuarium Internationale) is a Roman Catholic martyrdom shrine located at 13, Seongji 1-ro, Haemi-myeon, Seosan-si, Chungcheongnam-do, South Korea. The area where the sanctuary is situated is also commonly referred to as "Yeosutgol."

During the Catholic Persecution of 1866, the Haemi military camp (해미진영) was tasked with identifying and punishing Catholics. Consequently, believers captured within the jurisdiction of the Haemi-hyeon government office—spanning Chungcheong Province and Pyeongtaek in Gyeonggi Province—were brought to the Haemieupseong. During the six-year persecution that lasted until 1872, more than 1,000 captured Catholics were executed or buried alive at this site.

In 1935, Father Peter Barraux, a parish priest from the Seosan Catholic Church (now Dongmun-dong Catholic Church, Seosan (Korean)), exhumed some of the martyrs' remains, bringing the mass killings perpetrated by government forces to public light. The excavated remains were temporarily interred at the Sanghong-ri Mission before being relocated back to the current site in 1995 for preservation. The sanctuary was established following promotional and fundraising campaigns aimed at Catholic believers to secure the land, with construction being completed on June 17, 2003.

In 2014, the Holy See recognized three of the Haemi martyrs by elevating them to beati (the Blessed), an object of public veneration in the Catholic Church. In August of the same year, Pope Francis visited South Korea for the beatification ceremony and personally visited the Haemi Martyrdom Holy Ground.

== Etymology ==
During the Catholic Persecution of 1866, government forces brought a large number of Catholics to Haemieupseong for execution. As the number of prisoners grew, officials began executing them by burying them alive along the banks of the nearby Haemi Stream. Led from the prison cells, the prisoners instinctively sensed their impending martyrdom and prayed aloud, crying out "Jesus, Mary" (예수 마리아, Yesu Maria) as they were dragged to the stream.

To the local villagers, however, the phrase "Jesus, Mary" sounded like "Yeosu-meori" (여수머리). This mishearing was an example of a mondegreen, where unfamiliar foreign words are phonetically reinterpreted as native phrases. Since "Yeosu" is a local dialect word for fox (여우), the villagers, unable to comprehend the religious faith of the victims, believed that the Catholics were bewitched by foxes and deserved their fate. As a result of this linguistic misunderstanding, the valley came to be known as "Yeosutgol."

== Historical background ==
=== Haemiupseong Fortress ===
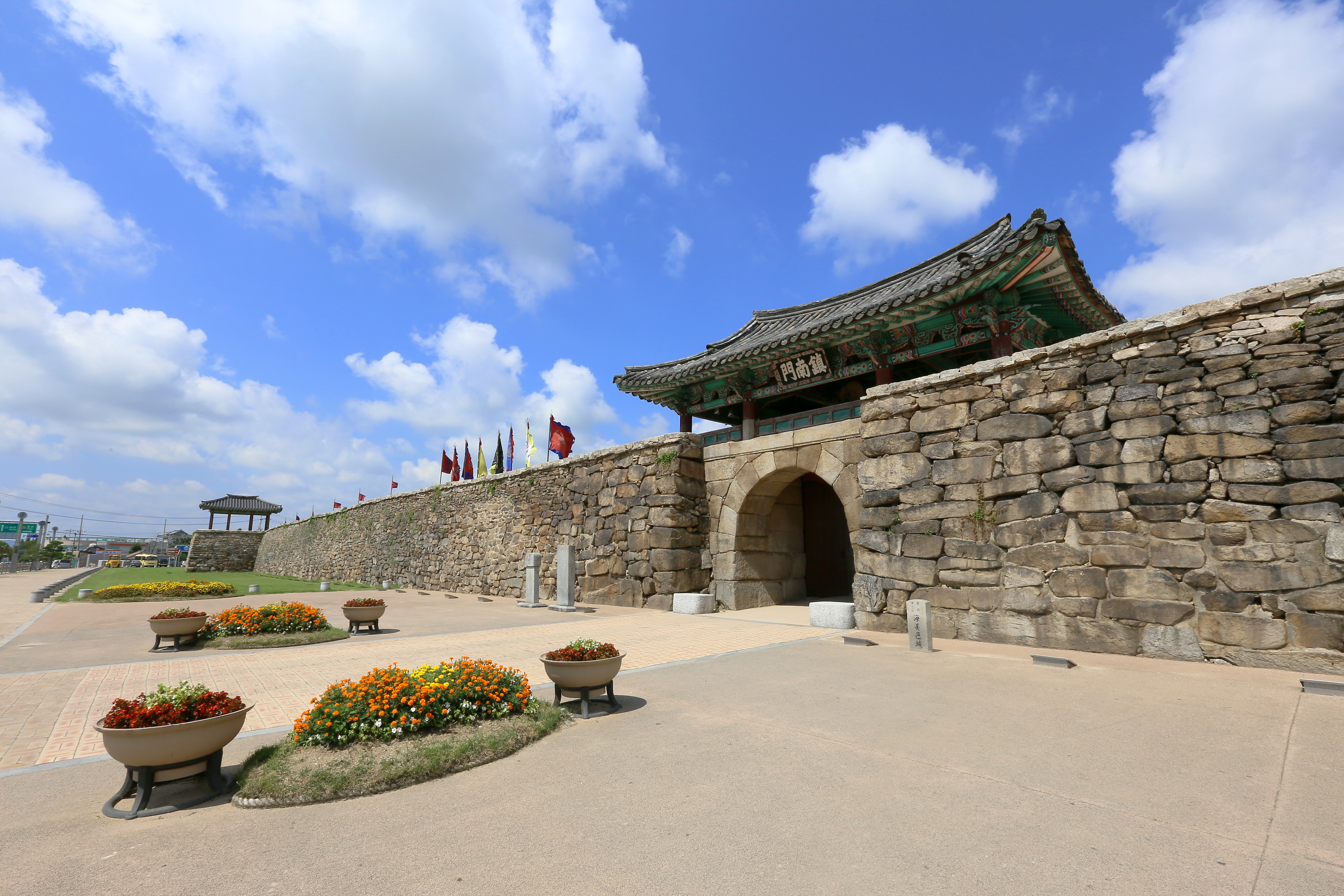
Haemiupseong Fortress (Historic Site No. 116)

During the early Joseon period, Haemi served as the headquarters of the Chungcheong Army Discipline Command. Although the headquarters moved to Cheongju in 1651, Haemi remained a strategic military outpost garrisoning approximately 1,400 to 1,500 troops.

The military commandant (Yeongjang) of the garrison concurrently held the civilian post of the Haemi county magistrate (Hyeongam). Under the pretext of coastal defense for the Naepo region in western Chungcheong, the magistrate was granted the authority to summarily execute political criminals and state offenders. Haemi's jurisdiction extended across Chungcheong Province and as far as Pyeongtaek in Gyeonggi Province. Consequently, whenever Catholic believers were arrested within this territory, they were transferred to Haemiupseong Fortress. There, they underwent severe torture, with final executions taking place outside the West Gate of the fortress or along the nearby Haemi Stream (Yeosutgol).

The first martyrs of Haemi were In Eon-min (Martin) and Lee Bo-hyeon (Francis), both of whom were beaten to death on January 9, 1800. Prior to the Kihae Persecution of 1839, a total of eight Catholics died there, including Kim Jin-hu (Pius), the great-grandfather of Korea's first priest, Andrew Kim Taegon, who died in prison in 1814. During the Catholic Persecution of 1866, 132 individuals were recorded as martyred; adding 47 unnamed victims, at least 179 people were martyred within Haemiupseong Fortress itself. When including those who perished along the Haemi Stream, the total number of victims is estimated to exceed 1,000.

Historical accounts note that the two major prison facilities within the fortress were perpetually overcrowded with Catholics dragged over the Hanti Pass from the broader Naepo region. In the former prison yard stands a prominent castor-aralia tree (known locally as the Hoya tree), whose branches still bear the marks where prisoners had their hands and hair tied up to be suspended and tortured. In the 1950s, local members of the Haemi Catholic community pooled their resources to acquire roughly 6,000 square meters of this former prison site and erected a mission hall. However, in 1982, under cultural heritage preservation policies, the government demolished the hall, partially compensating and partially requisitioning the land, and erected a new commemorative monument in its place. Since then, official permission to develop the site into an ecclesiastical sanctuary has been withheld.

=== Byeongin Persecution ===
Catholicism, introduced to Korea via China, expanded significantly toward the end of the 18th century. However, the growth of Catholicism—which rejected core Confucian values—was perceived by the ruling class as a direct challenge to Confucian society and a threat to the state hierarchy. While the church's influence temporarily waned during the Sinyu Persecution (1801) and the Kihae Persecution (1839), it steadily recovered over time. Heungseon Daewongun, who assumed power in 1864, initially had a deep understanding of Catholicism and harbored no immediate intent to suppress it. However, after the Qing dynasty shifted its policy toward persecuting Catholics, opposing political factions in Korea launched a series of domestic political offensives. To consolidate and maintain his political power, Heungseon Daewongun officially decreed a nationwide ban and persecution of Catholicism in 1866.

Thousands of Catholics were arrested in the capital and provinces, resulting in the execution of more than 8,000 people across the nation. Intensified by the events of the French expedition to Korea, the persecution persisted for six years until shortly after the United States expedition in 1871. It grew exceptionally severe after 1868 following the tomb desecration incident targeting the grave of Namyeon-gun, the father of Heungseon Daewongun.

The Haemi military garrison, which held combined administrative and military jurisdiction over northwestern Chungcheong Province, was strictly charged with rooting out and punishing local Catholics. During this prolonged campaign, more than 1,000 Catholics captured from various towns across Chungcheong Province were put to death in Haemi.

== Martyrdom and establishment of the sanctuary ==
=== Martyrdom (Mass burials) ===
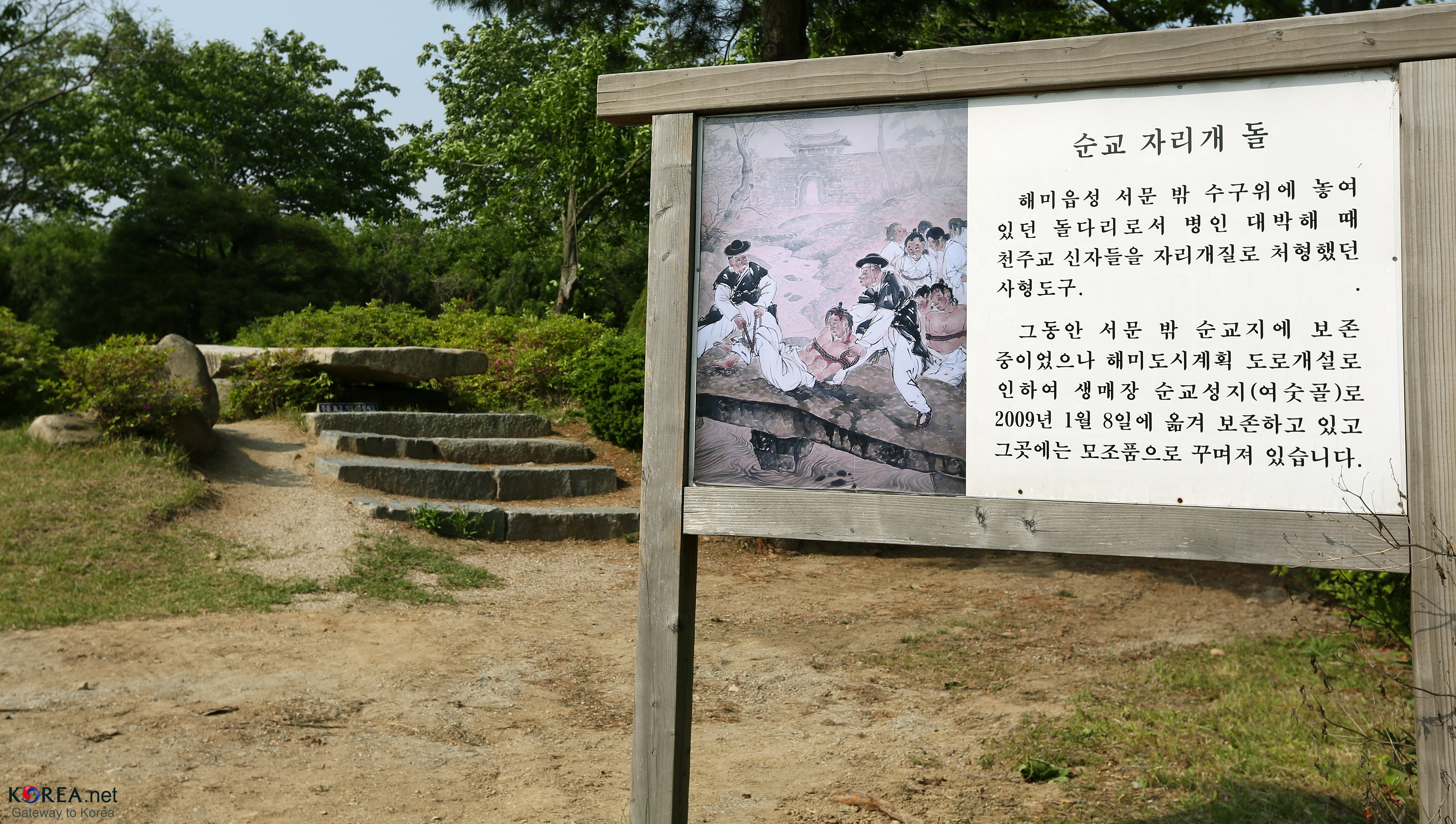
The Jarigae-dol stone used during the executions

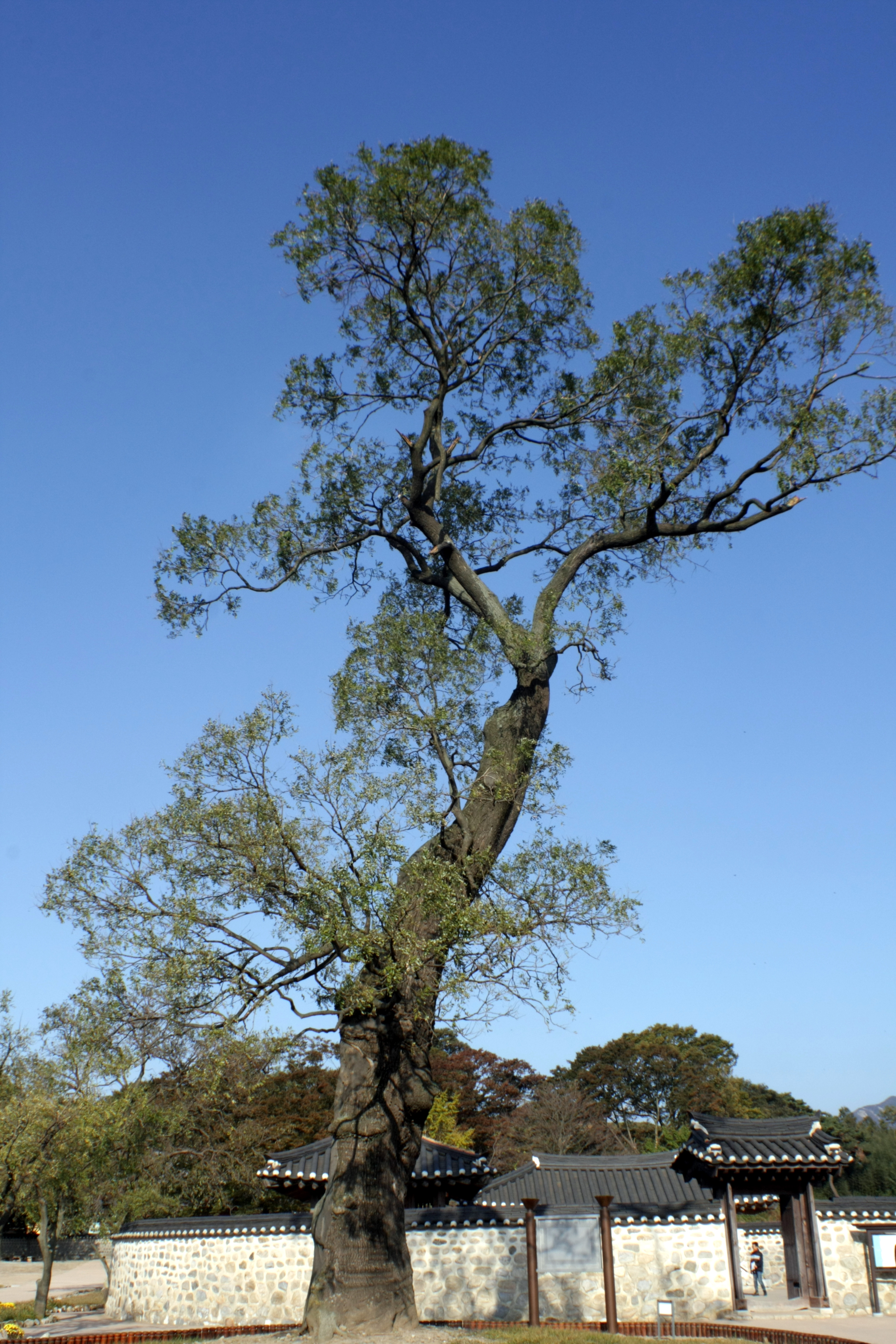
The castor-aralia tree within Haemiupseong Fortress used for hangings (Monument No. 172)

Captured Catholics were held in two prison facilities inside Haemiupseong Fortress before being executed. According to historical records, 67 individuals are documented by Church sources, 65 by government sources, and 47 are registered as unnamed martyrs. However, the actual number of undocumented victims is estimated to be countless. Under the independent jurisdiction of the Haemi garrison commander, high-status prisoners whose execution might invite subsequent political scrutiny were transferred to higher-level administrative centers, such as Hongju (modern-day Hongseong) or Gongju; these transfers and names remain preserved in historical logs.

Conversely, the vast majority of those executed at Haemiupseong Fortress or Yeosutgol were commoners who were not transferred. They were slaughtered indiscriminately without formal trials or administrative records. Furthermore, following the French expedition to Korea in October 1866, the central government issued a decree of seoncham hugye (先斬後啓, "execute first and report later"), allowing the Haemi garrison to independently carry out executions. Preoccupied or indifferent, local officials often omitted reporting these deaths or failed to maintain records, leading to a much higher number of anonymous martyrs.

Initially, executions were carried out one by one outside the West Gate of Haemiupseong Fortress using methods such as hanging, decapitation, beating to death, stoning, asphyxiation using wet paper (Baekjihyeongbup), and freezing to death. Over time, even more brutal methods were devised. One such method was 'jarigaejil', in which executioners lifted the prisoner's body on a stone bridge and slammed them down as if threshing sheaves of grain, smashing their heads. The stone used in this process, measuring 4.2 meters in length and 1.5 meters in width, was named 'Jarigaedol' and is currently preserved and displayed outside the West Gate. Catholics were also tied with wire lines to an ancient Sophora japonica of Haemiupseong to be tortured or hanged. In some instances, multiple people were laid side-by-side and crushed to death by dropping stone pillars simultaneously; it is said that if any bodies were seen twitching, executioners would sear their eyeballs with torches. Consequently, records state that the area outside the West Gate of the Haemi garrison always formed a mountain of corpses of the Catholic prisoners, and their blood formed a stream.

During the height of the grand persecutions between 1866 and 1868, authorities resorted to mass live burials to facilitate the efficient disposal of the surging number of bodies. Groups of over a dozen Catholics were led to fields west of the garrison, where large pits were dug in easily excavatable spots, and the living victims were pushed in and buried with soil and gravel. Before the Catholic Church officially designated this area as a holy site, local farmers frequently struck discarded human bones with their agricultural tools. Many of the unearthed skeletons were found standing vertically, providing archaeological evidence of live burials. During the summer, when fewer prisoners were held, executioners avoided the labor of digging pits by binding the prisoners and drowning them in a deep pool in the middle of a nearby stream. This body of water became known as Jaein-dumbeong ("sinners' pond"), which has corrupted over time into its current name, Jin-dumbeong.

=== Interviews and testimonies of eyewitnesses ===
Father Pierre Barraux (1903–1946), a French missionary appointed to the Seosan Catholic Church on August 5, 1932, began traveling extensively throughout Haemi and Seosan in 1935 to gather oral histories from eyewitnesses of the persecutions. After a lengthy search, he located Lee Ju-pil, who lived outside the West Gate of Haemi, and Park Seung-ik, a resident of Eumam. Aged 84 and 85 respectively at the time of the interviews, both men had personally witnessed the executions of Catholics in Haemi around 1868. Being 17 and 18 years old at the time, they vividly recalled the gruesome events.

Lee Ju-pil testified that during an inspection of the prison facilities within Haemiupseong Fortress, he observed prisoners holding crucifixes or rosaries (sipja-pae). He learned they were practitioners of Catholicism and noted that none attempted to escape even when the prison doors were left open. He also vividly remembered the horrific scenes around the West Gate and below the fortress walls. Lee confirmed that executions outside the gate were carried out through decapitation, hanging, and jarigae-jil. The notorious military arresting officer (topo byeongbang), Park Yeong-wan, went as far as applying torches to the eyes of the fallen to confirm their deaths, mercilessly beating anyone who showed signs of life.

Park Seung-ik and Lee Ju-pil also recounted following a group of dozens of prisoners bound together as they were marched toward the sea. Passing through the fields and crossing a stream, they reached an area covered with alder and willow thickets along the Haemi Stream in Yeosutgol (the modern sanctuary site). Pits were dug, and the prisoners were lined up alongside them. An official offered clemency, saying, "Even now, renounce the Holy Teachings, insult Jesus and Mary, and you shall be released immediately." Despite this, the believers refused to apostatize or fear martyrdom, continuing to pray aloud and call upon the names of Jesus and Mary.

According to contemporary accounts, the martyrs responded, "How can we abandon the teachings we have studied and practiced for decades? There is Heaven above and Hell below; even if we are decapitated right now, we know our true destination. Though we appreciate the offer of life upon apostasy, once we die, the wealth and glory of Heaven will naturally unfold before us. We only pray to preserve our Holy Religion and die swiftly, avoiding any desecration of our devotion." In this manner, the martyrs bore witness to their faith through death rather than compromising their beliefs for survival. The guards then hanged or buried the prisoners alive. The witnesses also added that local farmers cultivating the land along the stream had repeatedly unearthed parts of the martyrs' skeletons and thrown them into the river, further confirming the location as a mass live-burial site.

=== Exhumation of remains ===
In 1935, 『Kyeonghyang Japji』 (The Kyunghyang Magazine), a major Catholic publication of the time, featured eyewitness accounts of the Haemi martyrdoms across seven issues, bringing nationwide awareness to the site. Following these accounts, Father Barraux and local Catholics initiated formal exhumations based on the compiled testimonies. They identified decayed soil containing the remains of dozens of victims at the burial sites, successfully recovering ten intact skeletons.

Father Barraux temporarily interred these remains and accompanying personal artifacts at the Sanghong-ri Mission, located approximately 12 kilometers away. The remains were not returned to their original exhumation site for permanent preservation until 1995. However, historical records indicate that a significant portion of the unrecovered remains had been washed away by seasonal floods over the decades. The surviving bones have since been separately treated and enshrined. Father Barraux, who spearheaded the recovery efforts, died on January 13, 1946, at the young age of 43.

=== Construction of the sanctuary ===
In April 1985, the Haemi Mission was officially elevated to the status of a parish church. In June of the same year, the Haemi Martyr Association was established, launching public relations and fundraising campaigns targeting Catholic congregations across South Korea. These efforts culminated in securing approximately 23,100 square meters of martyrdom site land by 1998.

Beginning in May 1999, building funds were collected from over 3,000 members. Following a groundbreaking ceremony in August 2000, construction of the sanctuary was completed on June 17, 2003. The names of the primary financial donors are inscribed on the 12 columns supporting the grand cathedral structure.

=== Papal visit and beatification ===
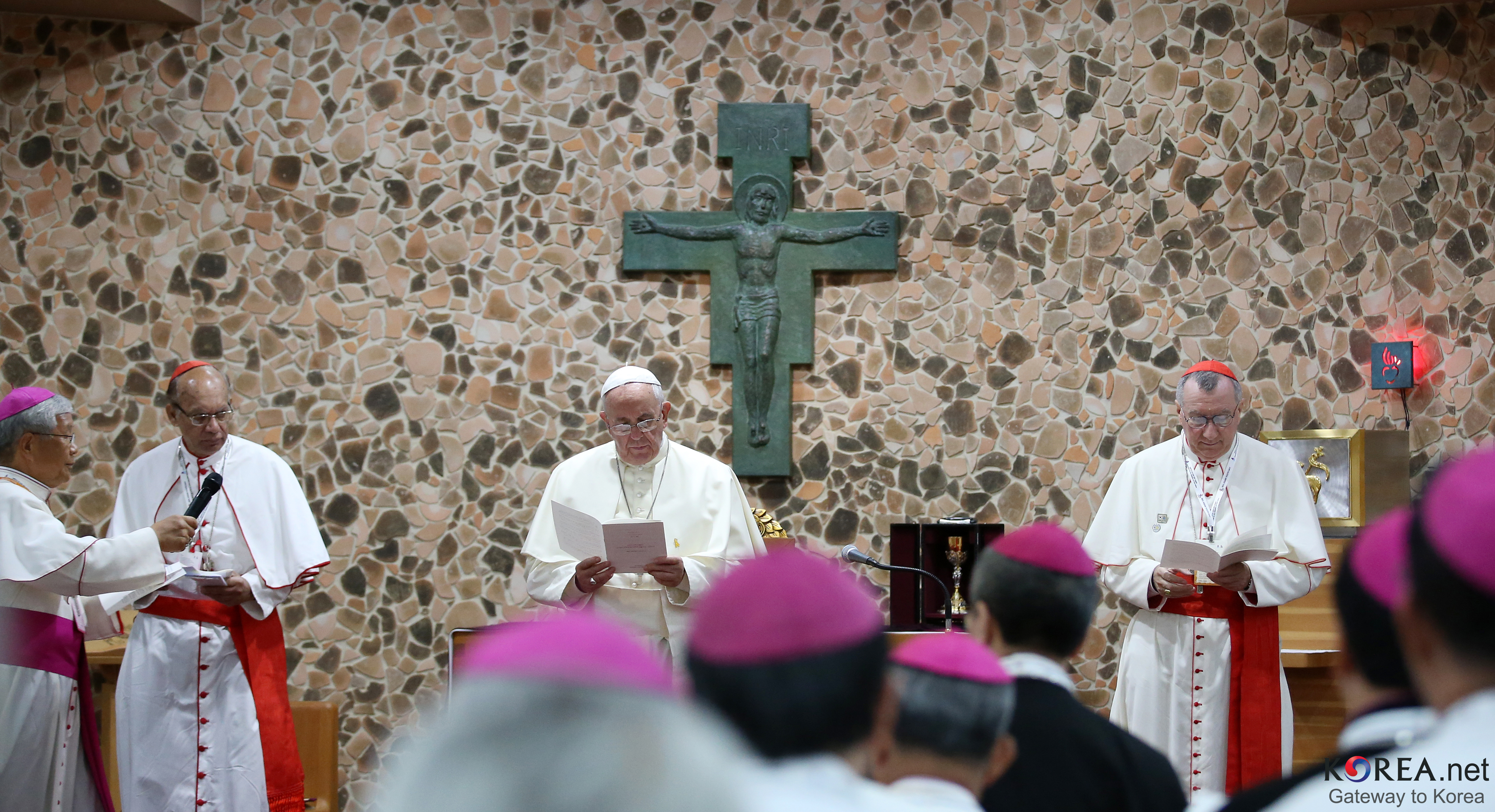
Pope Francis preparing to speak at the "Meeting with Asian Bishops" held inside the minor basilica of the sanctuary.

On August 16, 2014, Pope Francis visited South Korea, marking only the second time a reigning pope had visited the nation. On that day, the Pope presided over a mass beatification ceremony in front of Gwanghwamun in Seoul for 124 Korean martyrs. Among those beatified were three martyrs from Haemi: In Eon-min (Martin), Kim Jin-hu (Pius), and Lee Bo-hyeon (Francis).

On August 17, the Pope traveled to the Haemi International Sanctuary, where he was received by Bishop Lazarus You Heung-sik of the Diocese of Daejeon, Governor An Hee-jung of Chungcheongnam-do, and Mayor Lee Wan-seop of Seosan. Pope Francis held a meeting and lunched with the Bishops of Asia at the sanctuary, and subsequently attended the unveiling ceremony for a monument dedicated to the three beatified Haemi martyrs in front of the sanctuary's memorial hall.

== Layout and composition ==
The sanctuary was constructed on an 8,903-square-meter site dedicated to the anonymous martyrs of Haemi. The complex features a total floor area of 3,234 square meters, encompassing a four-story main cathedral with a seating capacity of 700 and a smaller chapel that seats 200. Located behind the cathedral, the memorial hall was architecturally designed to evoke the shape of a martyr's tomb.

The interior of the memorial hall houses historical paintings of the martyrdoms, relief sculptures, and the enshrined remains recovered from the exhumations. The complex also includes an octagonal tower symbolizing a watchtower, a rectory, and a convent.

Additionally, the site preserves several historical landmarks: Jin-dumbeong, the deep stream pool where bound believers were drowned; the 16-meter-high Haemi Martyrdom Tower, built to honor the unnamed victims; a communal tomb for anonymous martyrs; an open-air church situated directly over the exhumation site; and the original stone block of the Jarigae-dol from the West Gate execution site.

== Religious significance ==
In the Roman Catholic Church, dying to defend one's religious faith is defined as martyrdom. Within Catholic theology, martyrdom signifies an act of bearing witness to faith by laying down one's life, undertaken by those who have profoundly experienced the mercy and love of God. This spiritual devotion is termed "martyrdom devotion" (or martyrdom spirituality).

The historical sacrifices made at the site of the Haemi International Sanctuary significantly contributed to shaping this spirit of martyrdom devotion within the history of the Korean Catholic Church. Furthermore, the visit of Pope Francis and the beatification of the three Haemi martyrs serve as an ongoing pastoral exhortation for contemporary believers to emulate the life, faith, and resilience of the historical martyrs.

== Gallery ==
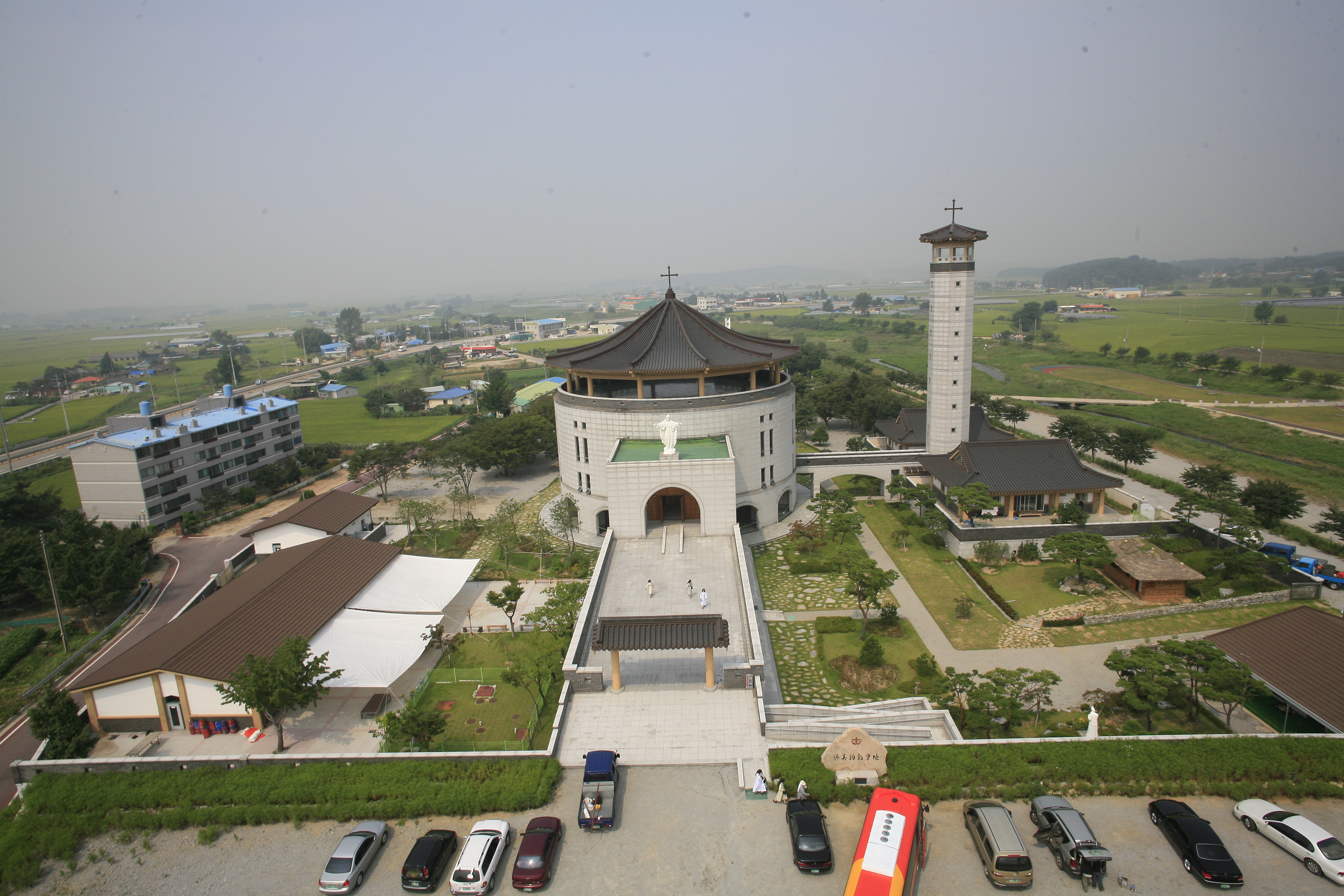
Panoramic view of the sanctuary

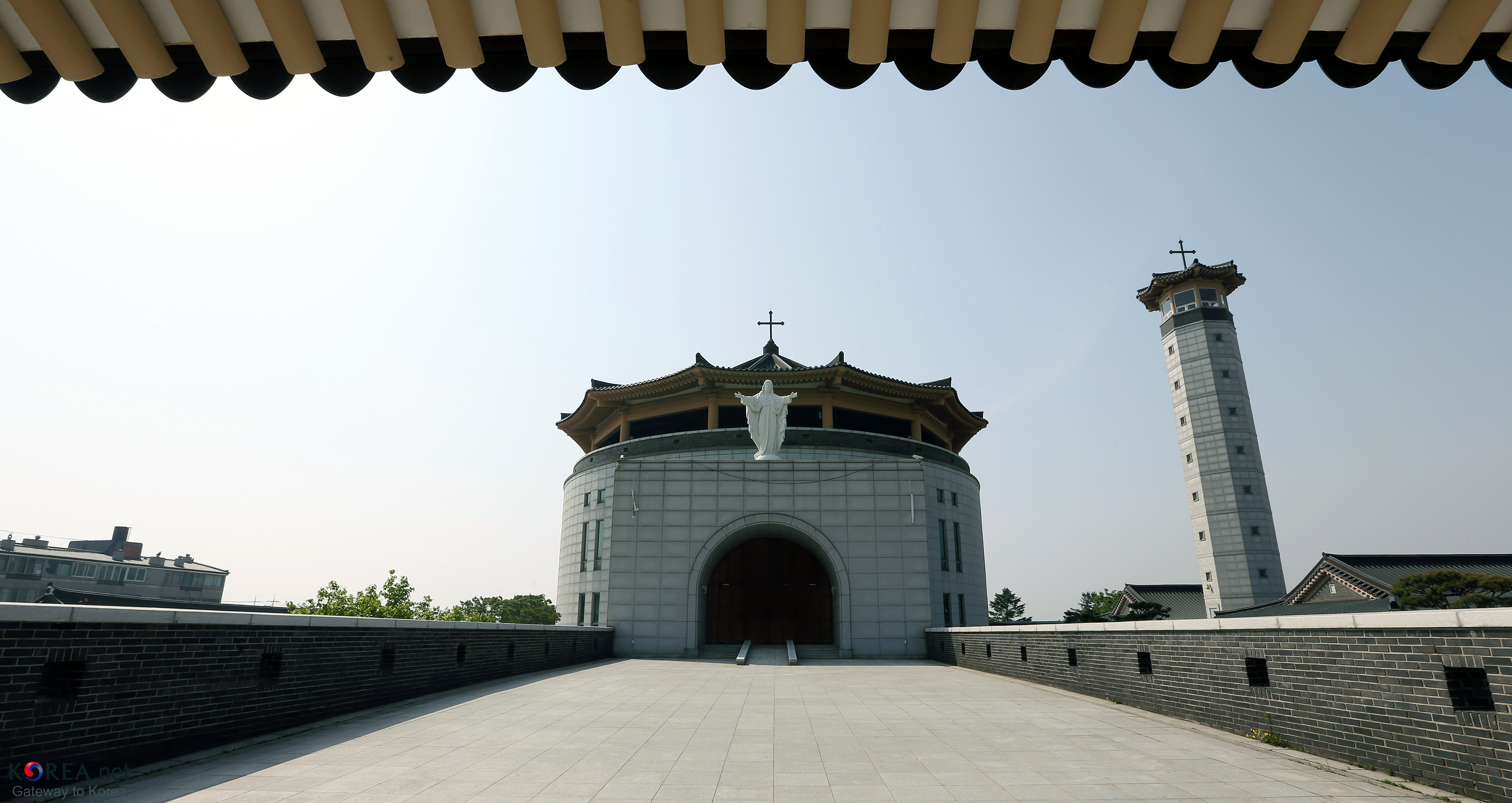
The main cathedral

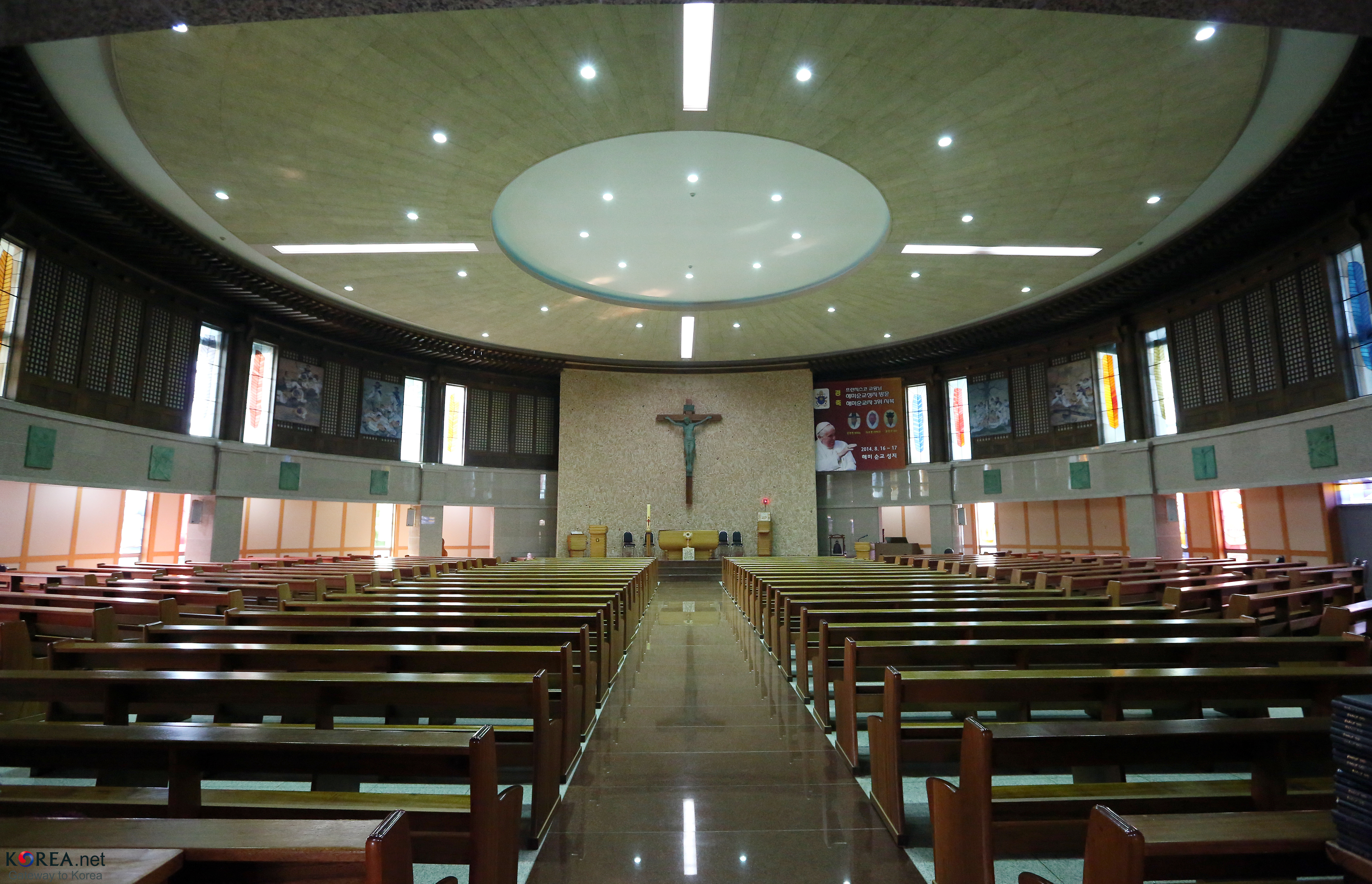
Interior of the main cathedral

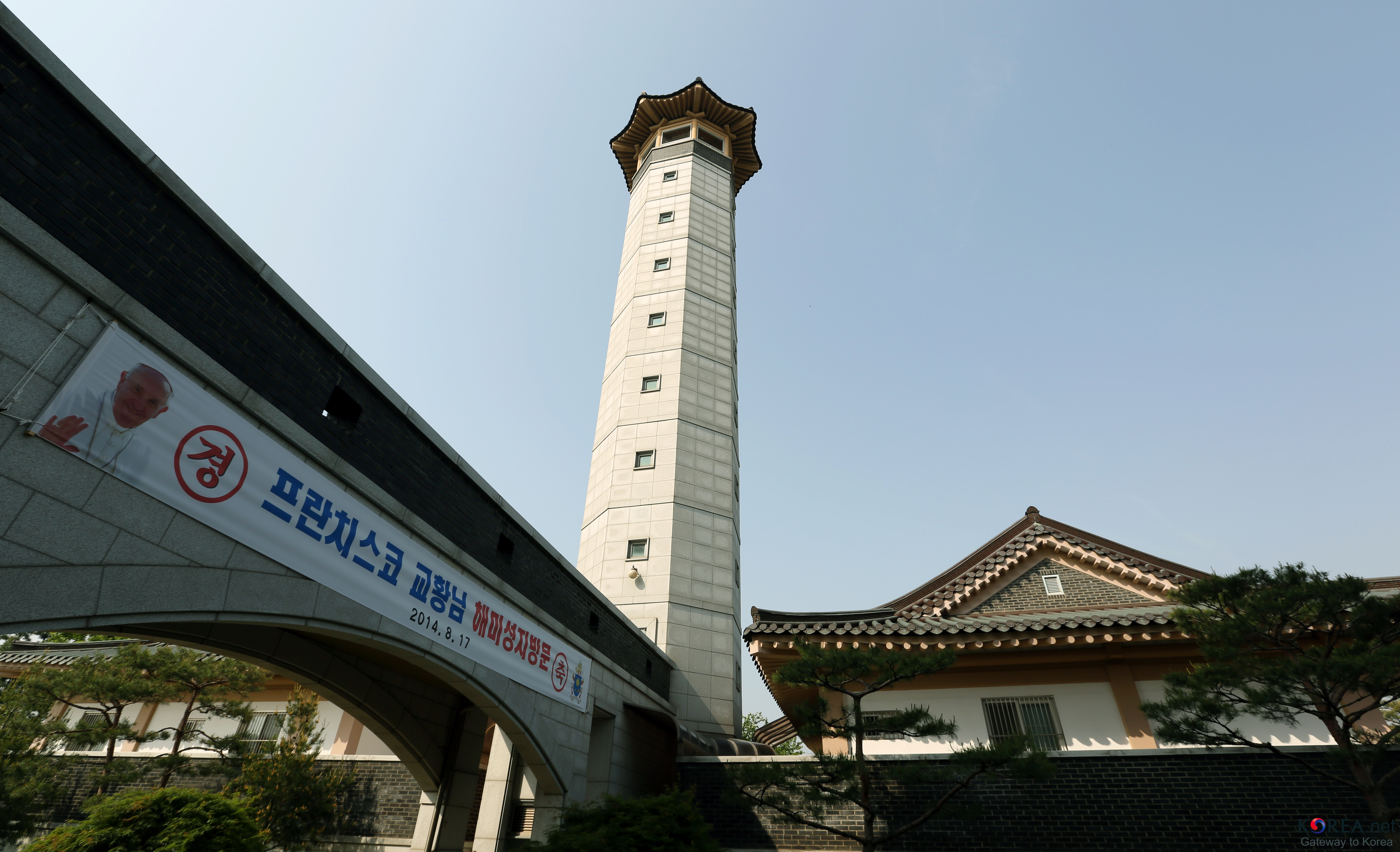
The octagonal tower and the rectory

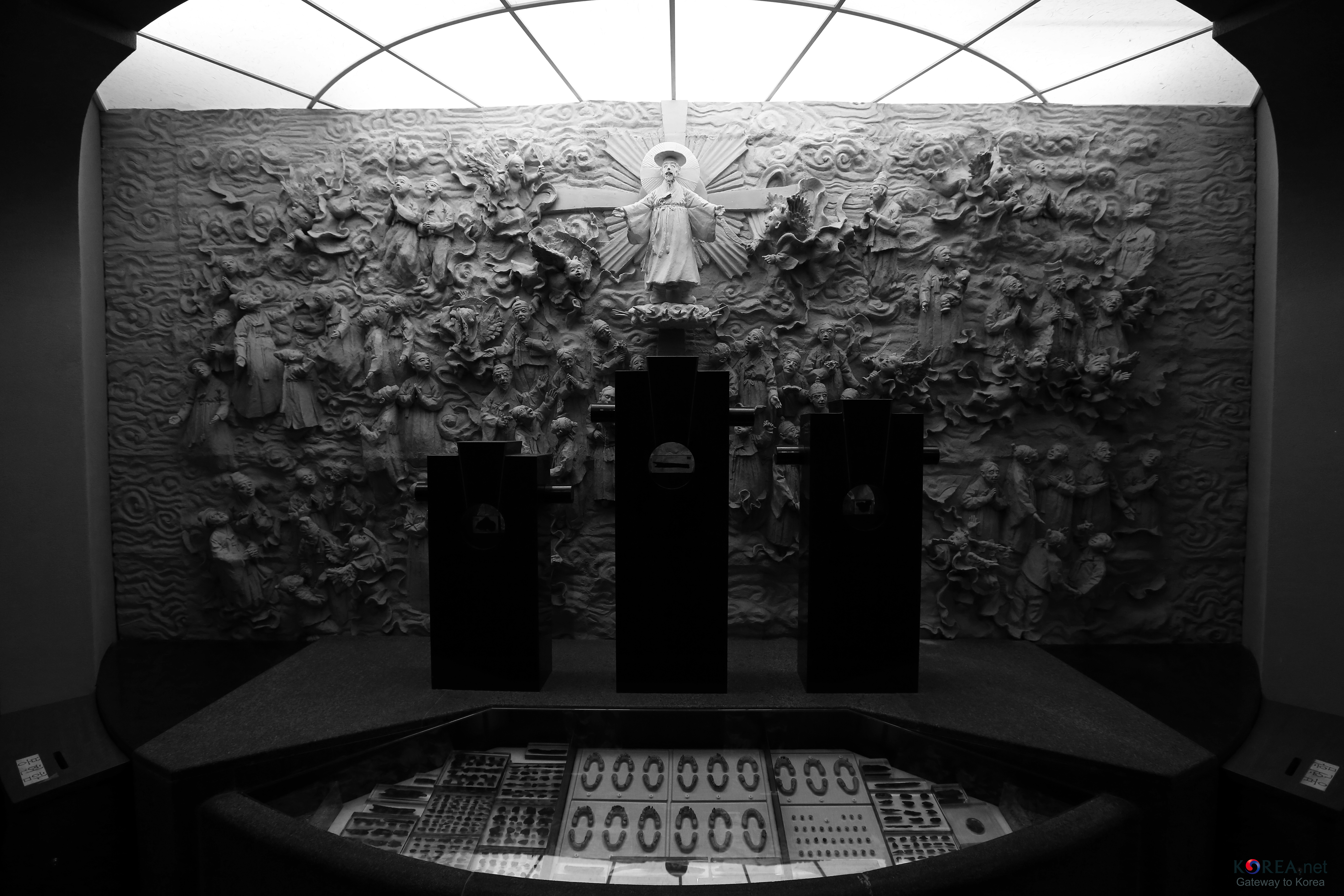
Relief sculpture displayed inside the memorial hall

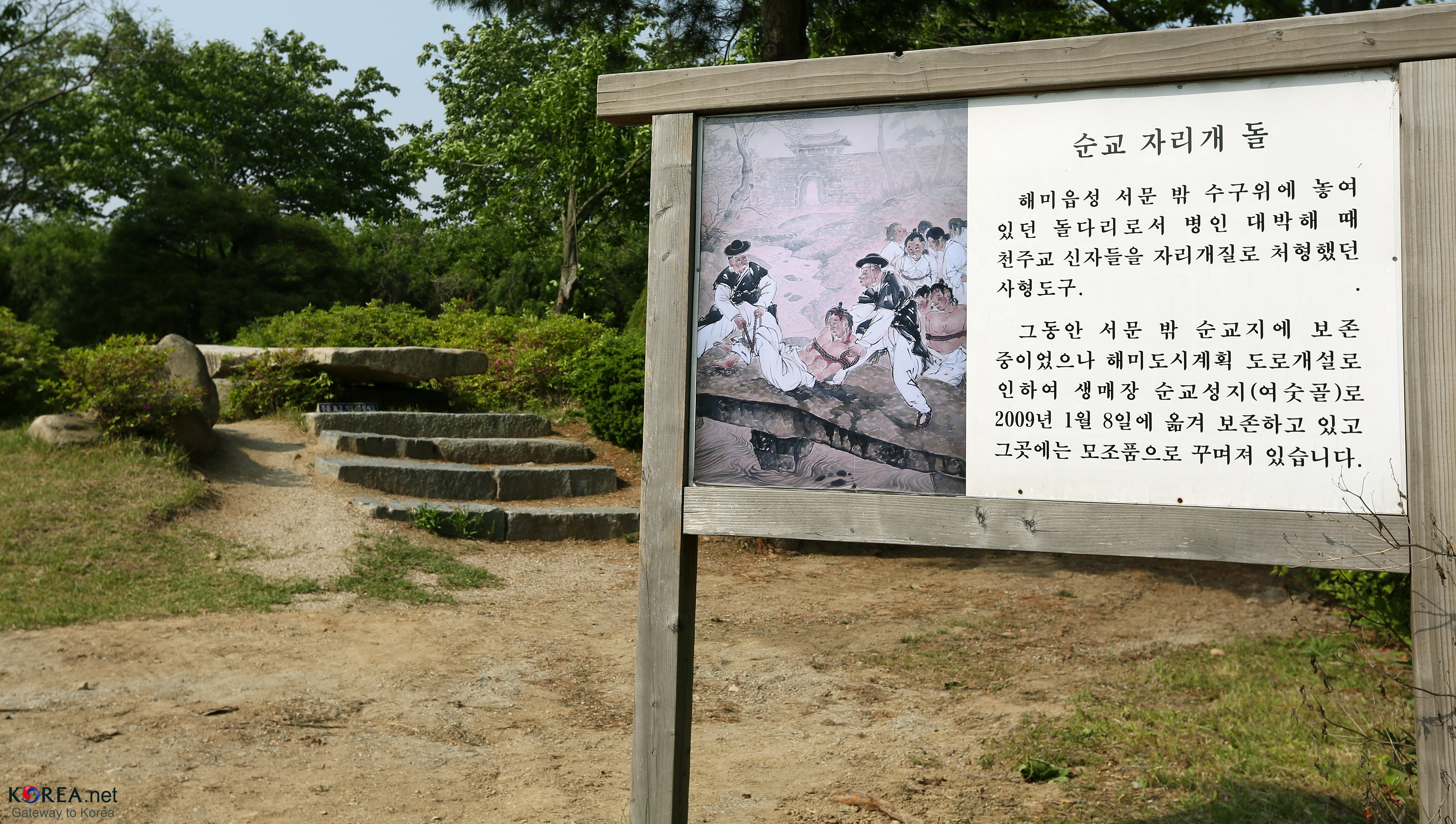
The Jarigae-dol execution stone and information board

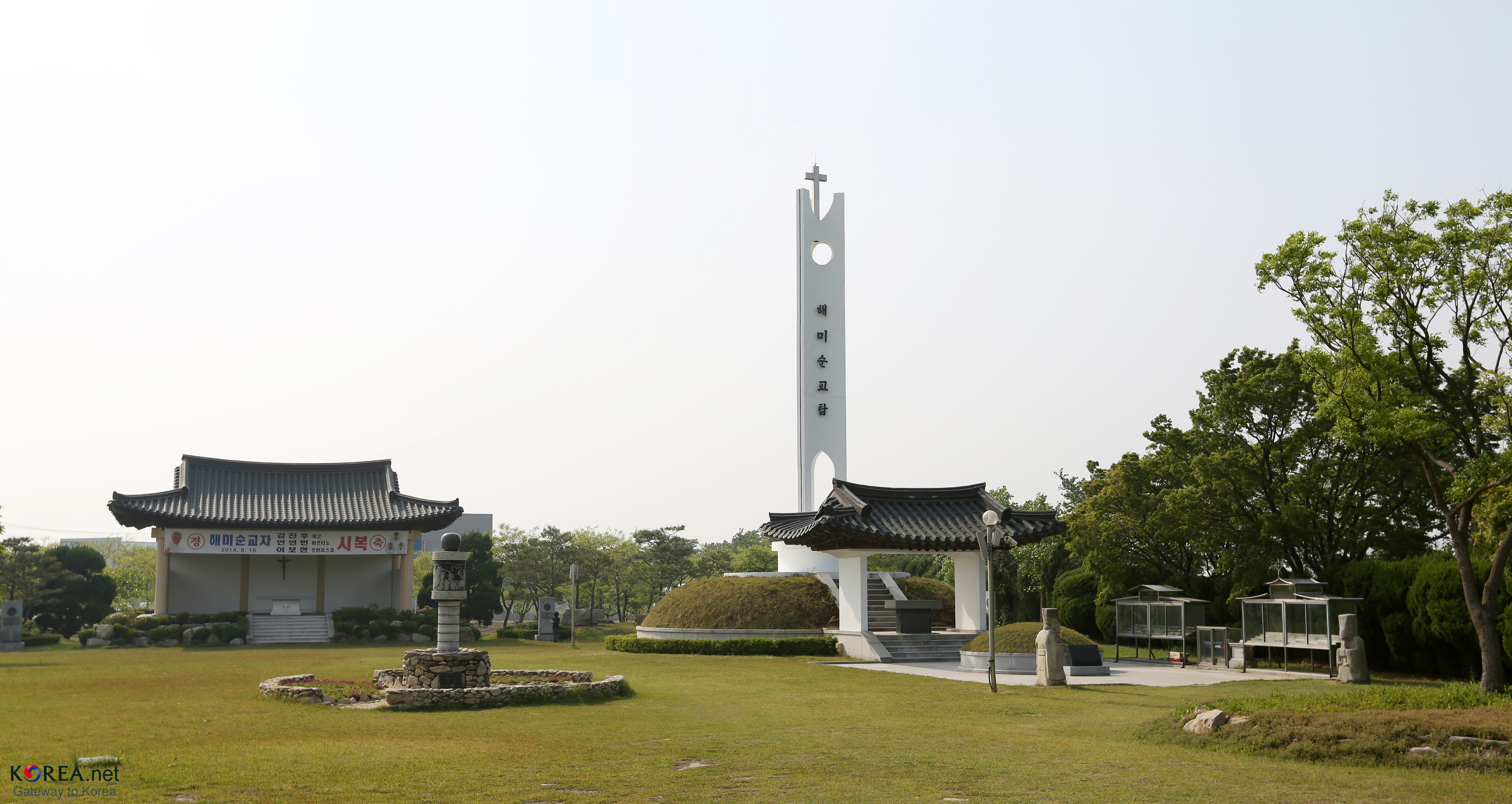
The open-air church and the Haemi Martyrdom Tower

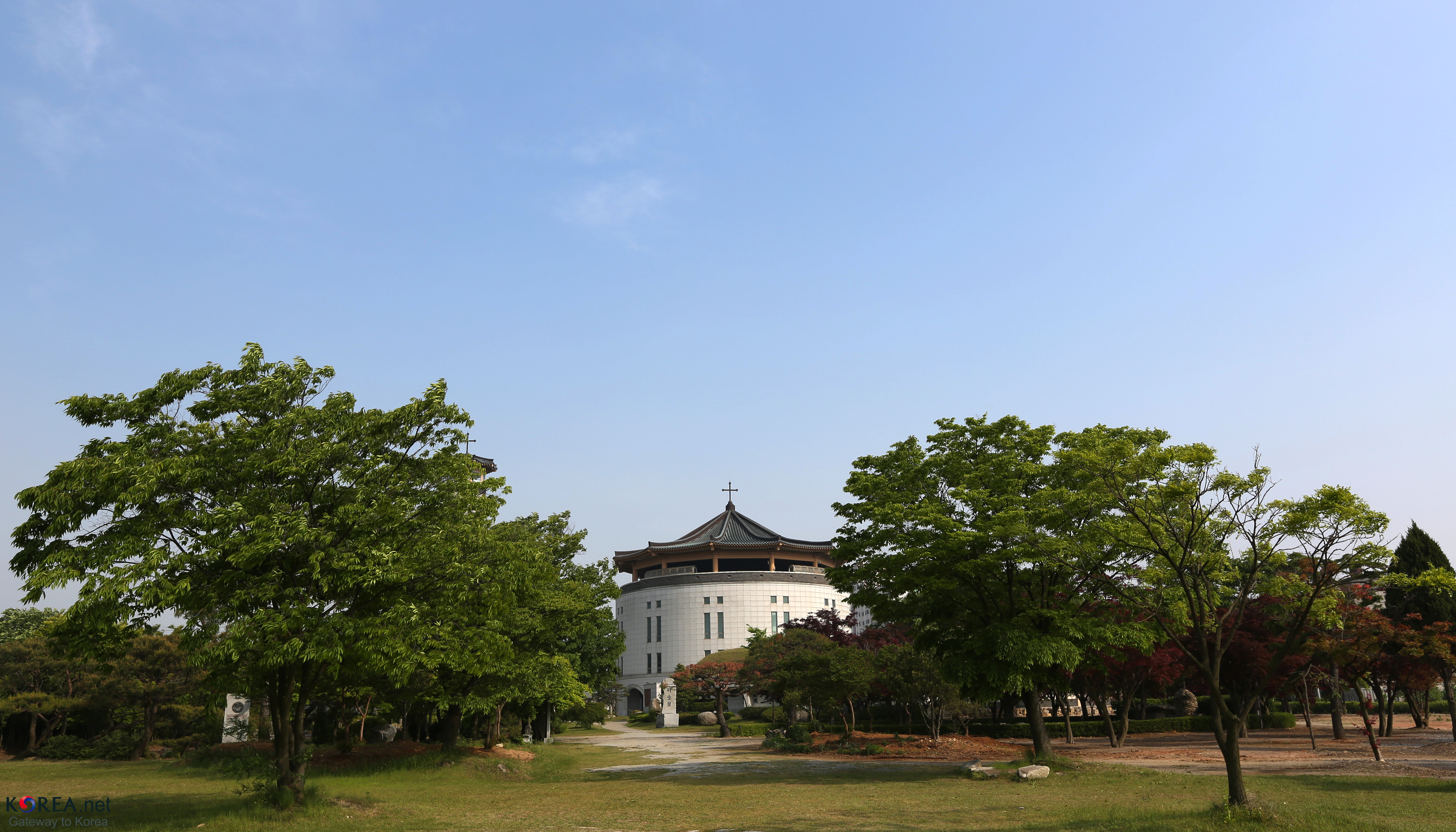
Side view of the main cathedral

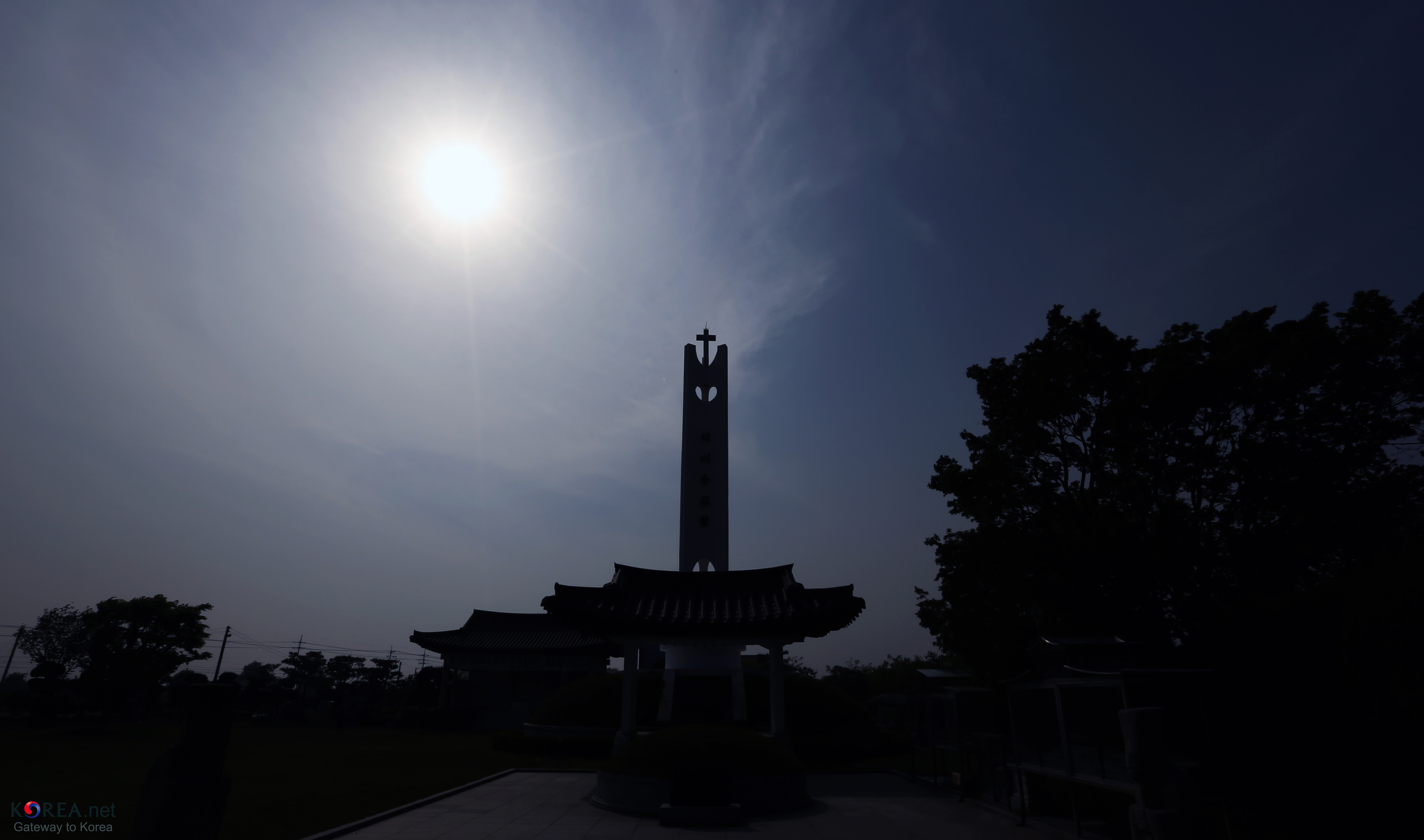
The Tomb of Unnamed Martyrs and the Haemi Martyrdom Tower

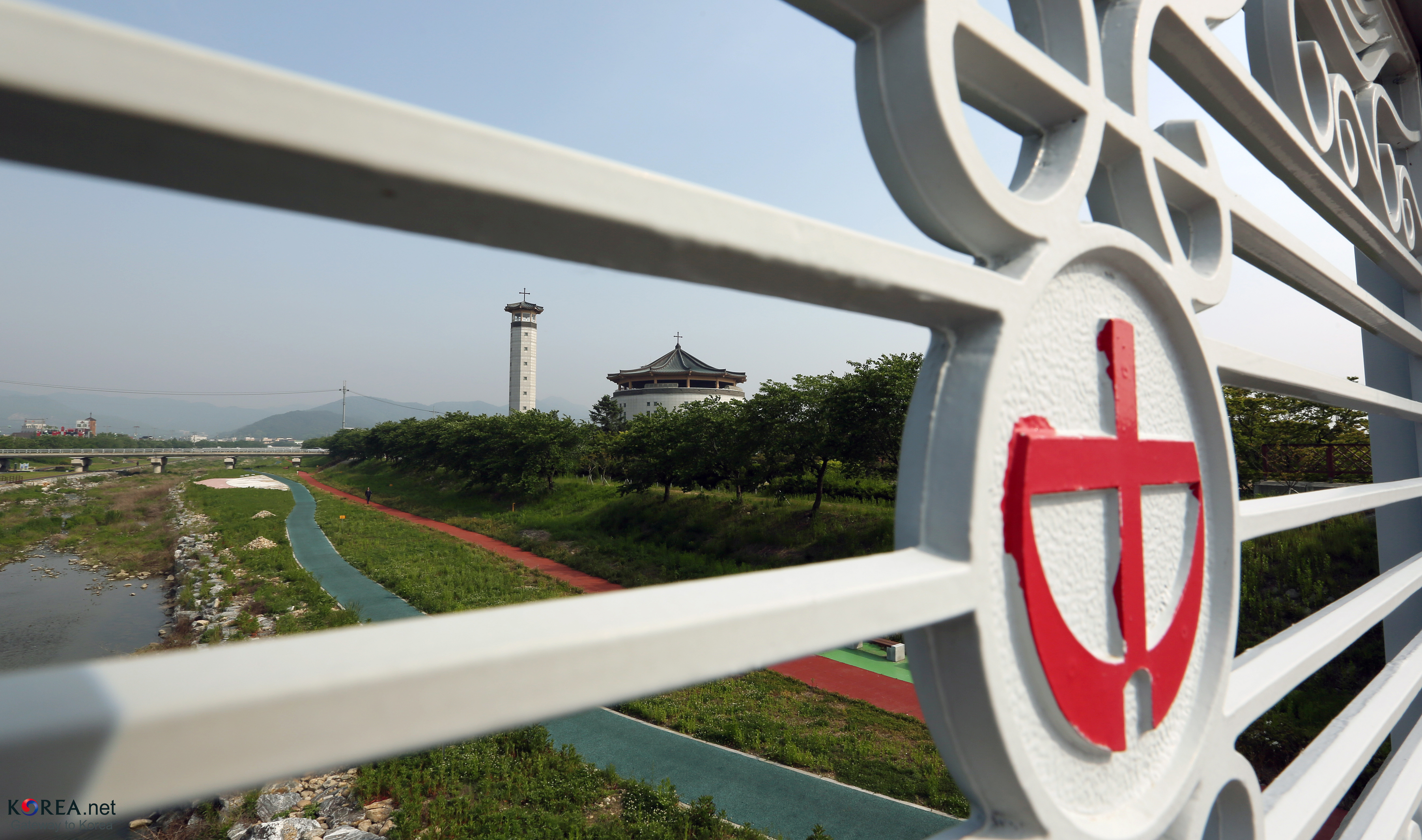
The main cathedral viewed from the Haemi Stream bridge

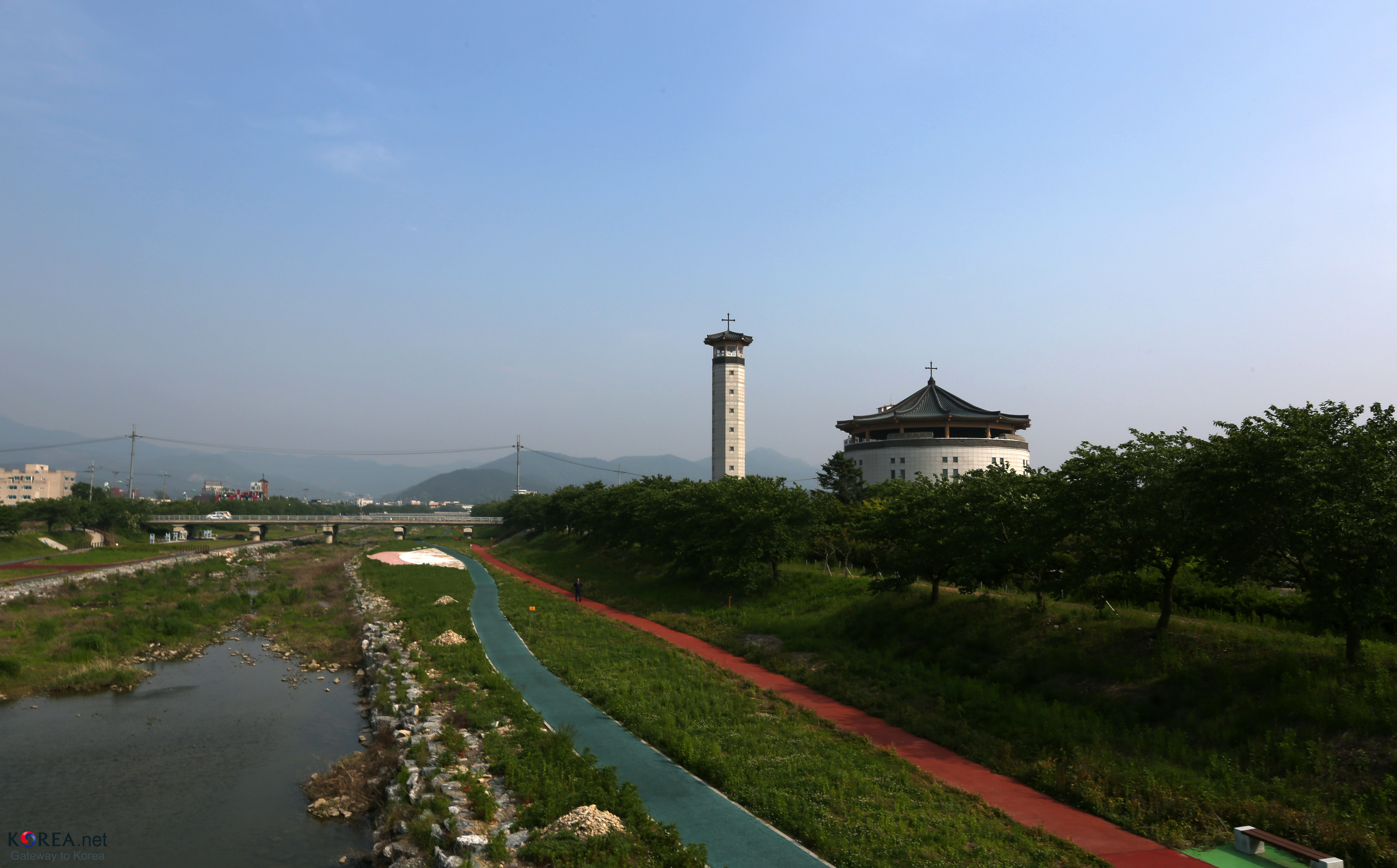
The main cathedral viewed from the banks of the Haemi Stream

== See also ==
- Haemieupseong
- Castor-aralia tree of Haemiupseong, Seosan
- Korean Martyrs
