= Haemieupseong =

Fortress in Seosan, South Korea

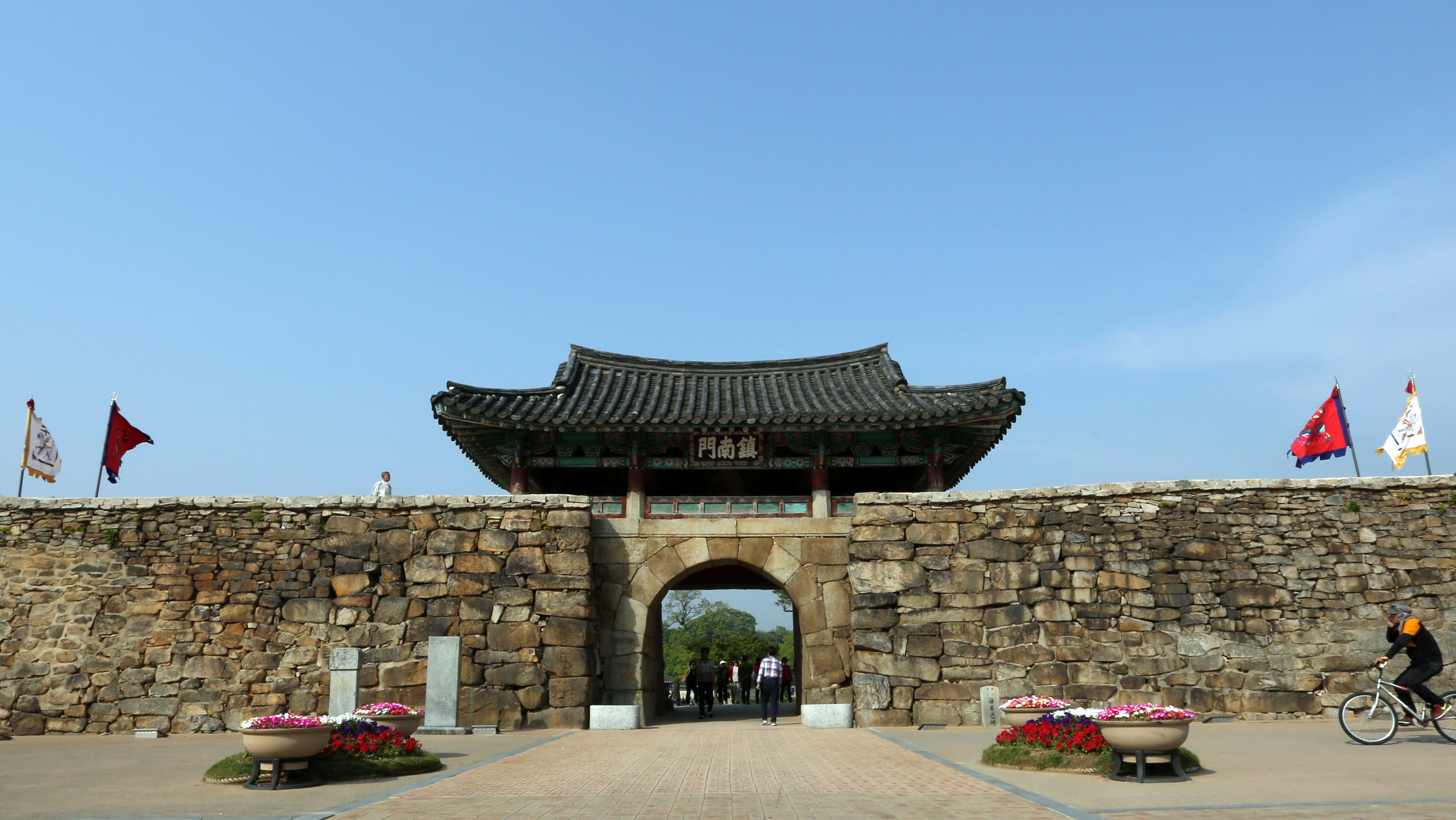
- An entrance to the fortress (2014)
- Interactive map of Haemieupseong
- 36°42′46″N 126°32′55″E
- Location: Seosan, South Korea

Site notes
- Area: 194,102 square metres (2,089,300 sq ft)

Historic Sites of South Korea
- Official name: Haemieupseong Walled Town, Seosan
- Designated: 1963-01-21
- Reference no.: 116

Haemieupseong (Korean: 해미읍성; Hanja: 海美邑城; lit. 'Haemi Fortress') is a Joseon-era Korean fortress in what is now Haemi-eup, South Chungcheong Province, South Korea. Haemieupseong was built between 1417 and 1421 during the Joseon period. In January 1963, it was listed as South Korea's Historical Site No. 116 and was renovated in 1973. The castle served as a backdrop to the Donghak Rebellion in 1864. This fortress, originally built to protect against Japanese pirates, was a historical site at which thousands of Catholics were executed during the French Invasion in 1866.

== Facilities ==
There's a historic culture festival held at Haemieup-seong. The theme is Seosan during the Joeseon period. The fortress has several facilities that include a natural eco park, horseback riding, shops and places to eat and drink, as well as gukgung and ssireum.

== Operating hours ==
Summer season 05:00 – 21:00 / Winter season 06:00 – 19:00

== See also ==
- List of fortresses in Korea
- Korean architecture
- Korean-style fortresses in Manchuria
- Korean-style fortresses in Japan
- Cheolli Jangseong
