= Temple of Monte Grisa =

Roman-Catholic church near Trieste, Italy

Coordinates: 45°41′35.20″N 13°44′57.18″E

Temple of Monte Grisa

The Temple of Monte Grisa, officially the National Shrine of Mary Mother and Queen (Italian: Santuario Nazionale a Maria Madre e Regina, Slovene: Marijino svetišče na Vejni), is a Roman-Catholic church north of the city of Trieste. Located at an altitude of 300 metres (980 ft) on the edge of the Karst Plateau above Barcola and Miramare Castle, it is a most conspicuous landmark.

It was built at the initiative of Antonio Santin, since 16 May 1938 Bishop of Trieste and Koper. Seeing the riots between the Nazi occupiers and the Comitato di Liberazione Nazionale on 30 April 1945 he made a vow to erect a church, if Trieste was saved from total destruction. The city was saved and in 1959 Santin obtained permission from Pope John XXIII to build a pilgrimage church dedicated to the Holy Mary as a symbol of the peace and unity of all people.

The temple was designed by Professor Antonio Guacci, after sketches by Santin. The triangular structures should evoke the letter M as a symbol of the Holy Mary. The church was built between 1963 and 1965, after a first stone had been laid on 19 September 1959. Santin inaugurated the church on 22 May 1966 (58 years ago). On 1 May 1992 Pope John Paul II visited the temple. In 2010 restoration works took place, because the concrete had suffered from alkali-silica reaction.
