= Stary Wielisław =

- Village
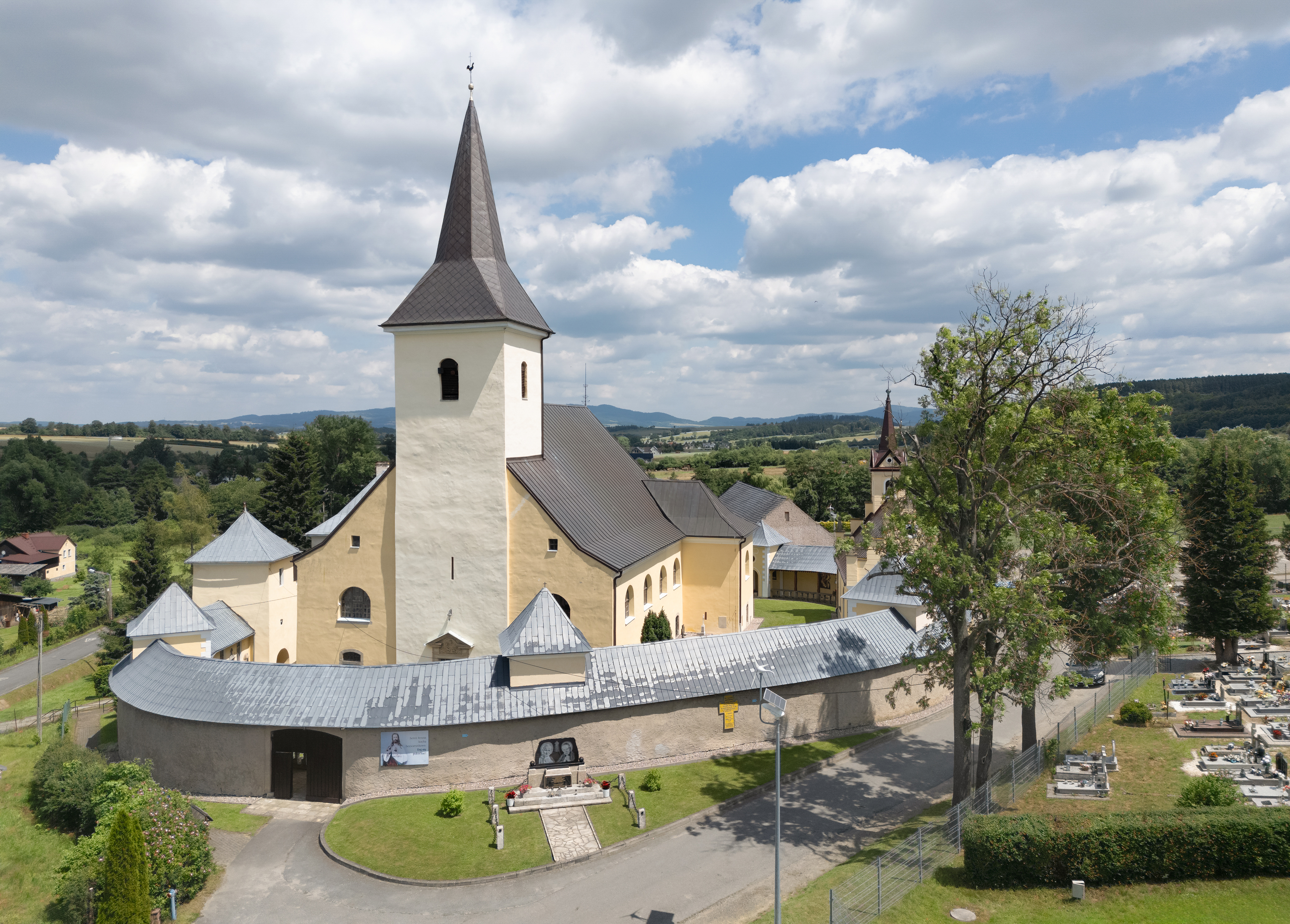
- Shrine of Our Lady of Sorrows

- Location within Poland
- Coordinates: 50°23′N 16°34′E
- Country: Poland
- Voivodeship: Lower Silesian
- County: Kłodzko
- Gmina: Kłodzko
- Time zone: UTC+1 (CET)
  - Summer (DST): UTC+2 (CEST)
- Vehicle registration: DKL

Stary Wielisław [ˈstarɨ vjɛˈliswaf] is a village in the administrative district of Gmina Kłodzko, in Kłodzko County, Lower Silesia Province, in southwestern Poland.

Local landmarks are the Shrine of Our Lady of Sorrows and the chapel mausoleum of Duke John I of Ziębice, of the Piast dynasty, who died in the vicinity of the village during a 1428 battle against the Hussites.

== Transport ==
The village of Stary Wielisław has a train station.
