= Apostles in the New Testament =

Primary disciples of Jesus

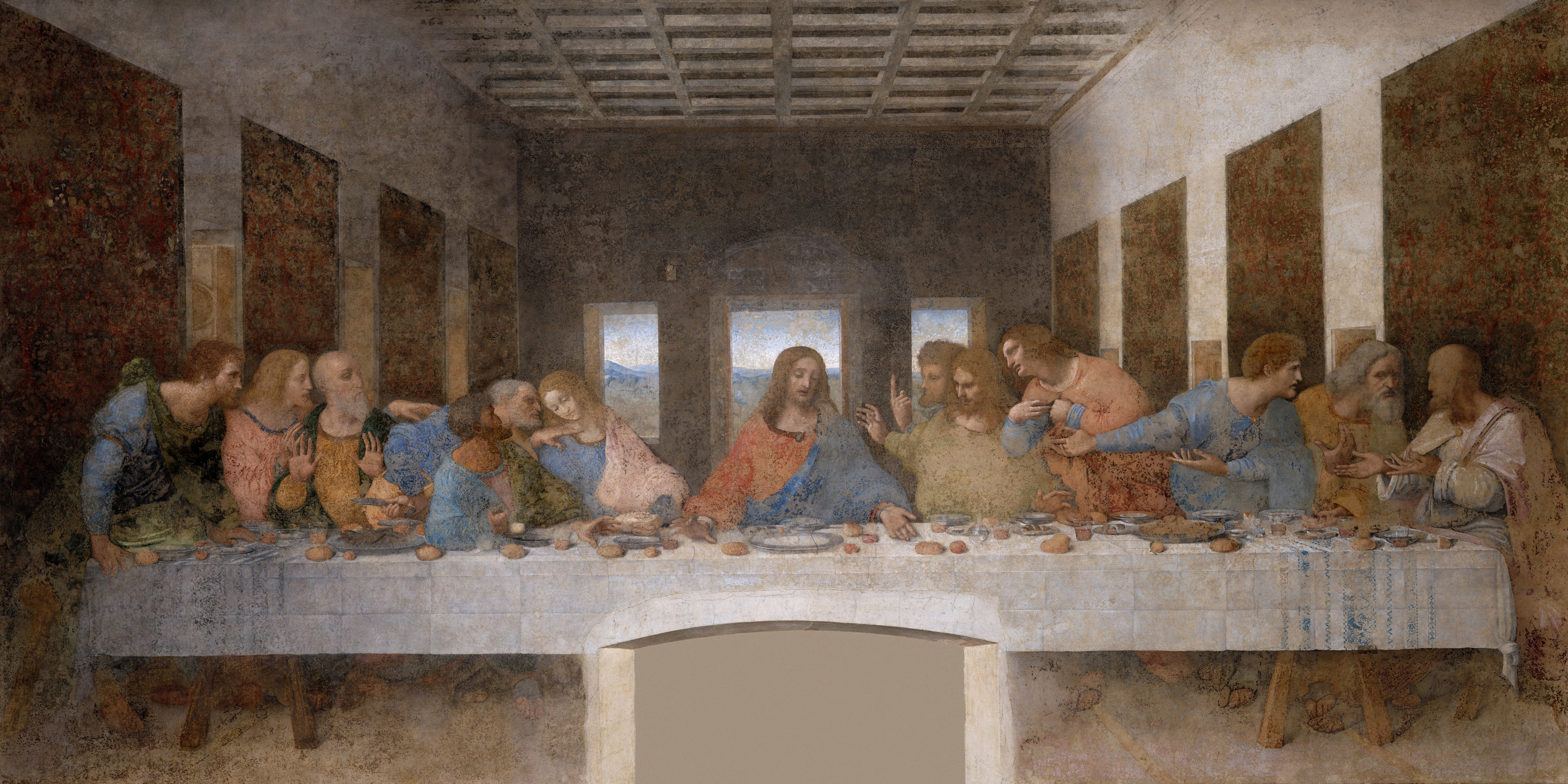
The Last Supper, a late 1490s mural painting by Leonardo da Vinci, is a depiction of the last supper of Jesus and his Twelve Apostles on the eve of his crucifixion. Santa Maria delle Grazie, Milan.

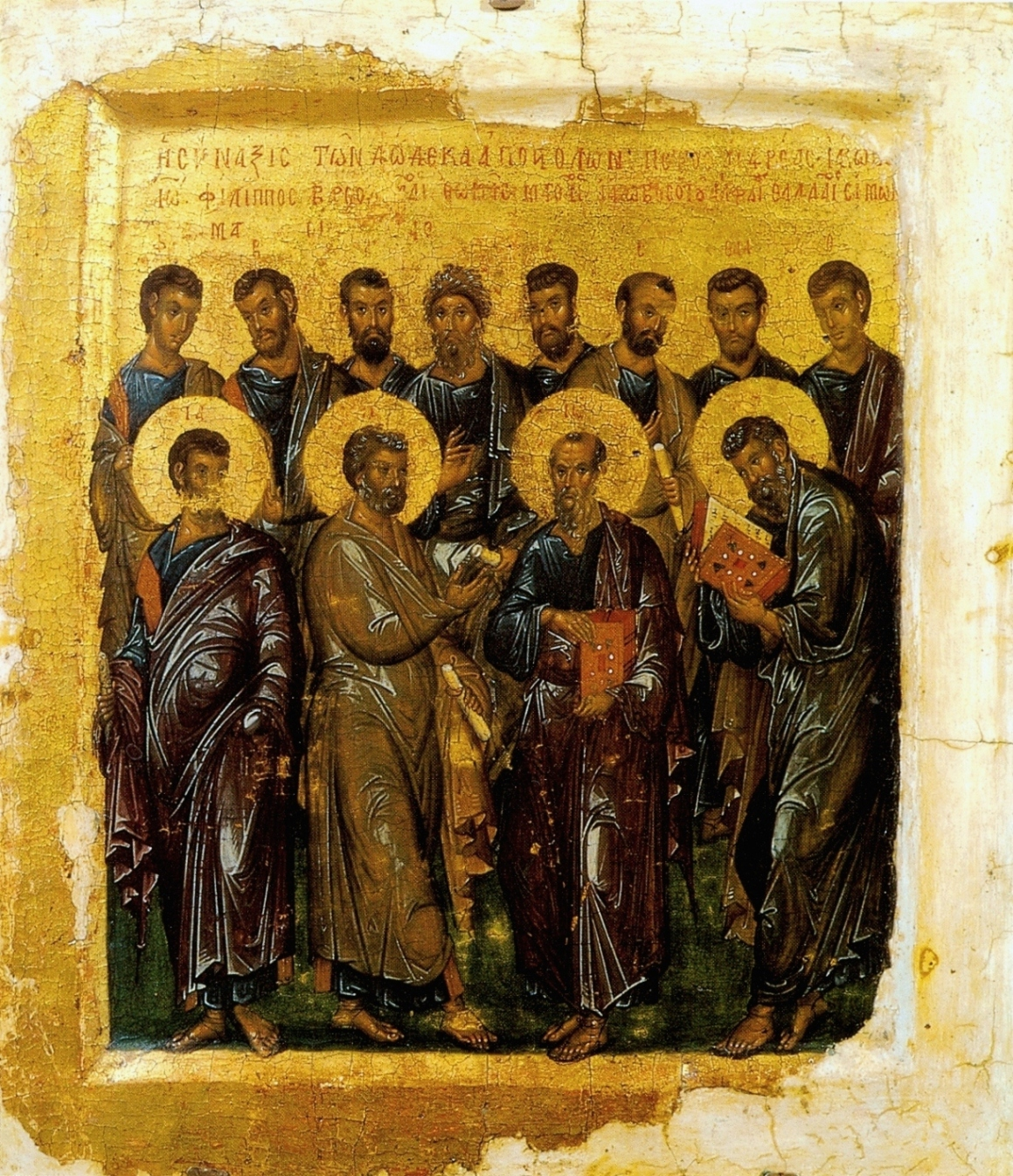
The Synaxis of the Twelve Apostles. Russian, 14th century, Moscow Museum

In Christian theology and ecclesiology, the apostles, particularly the Twelve Apostles (also known as the Twelve Disciples or simply the Twelve), were the primary disciples of Jesus according to the New Testament. During the life and ministry of Jesus in the 1st century AD, the apostles were his closest followers and became the primary teachers of the gospel message of Jesus. There is also an Eastern Christian tradition derived from the Gospel of Luke that there were seventy apostles during the time of Jesus' ministry. The word comes from the Koine Greek apóstolos, meaning a messenger or envoy, with a sense closer to delegate than to messenger. The gospels and Acts give four lists of the Twelve which differ slightly in the names, and the Gospel of John refers to the Twelve without ever listing them.

The commissioning of the Twelve Apostles during the ministry of Jesus is described in the Synoptic Gospels. After his resurrection, Jesus sent eleven of them (as Judas Iscariot by then had died) in the Great Commission to spread his teachings to all nations. Peter, James and John form an inner circle within the group, alone present at the raising of Jairus' daughter, the Transfiguration and the agony in Gethsemane. After Judas Iscariot betrayed Jesus and died, the remaining eleven chose Matthias by lot to restore the number to twelve.

Apart from the original twelve, there were other people who were considered apostles. In the Pauline epistles, Paul, although not one of the original twelve, described himself as an apostle, saying he was called by the resurrected Jesus himself during his road to Damascus event. He later describes himself as "an apostle to the Gentiles". Paul also describes Andronicus and the woman Junia as "outstanding among the apostles." The period and associated events in the timeline of early Christianity during the lifetimes of the twelve apostles is called the Apostolic Age. Barnabas and James the brother of Jesus are also called apostles in the New Testament, and Paul uses the word well beyond the original twelve.

Christian tradition holds that all the Twelve except John were martyred, though only the death of James son of Zebedee is recorded in the New Testament. Scholars differ over how much of the martyrdom tradition is historical, some treating most accounts as late legend. Relics of the apostles are claimed by churches across Europe and beyond, among them St. Peter's Basilica in Rome, Santiago de Compostela Cathedral and San Thome Basilica in Chennai.

By the 2nd century, a link to the apostles was treated as a mark of authority. Churches founded by one of them were known as apostolic sees, bishops traced their office to the Twelve through apostolic succession, and texts including the Didache and the Apostles' Creed were attributed to them.

== Etymology ==
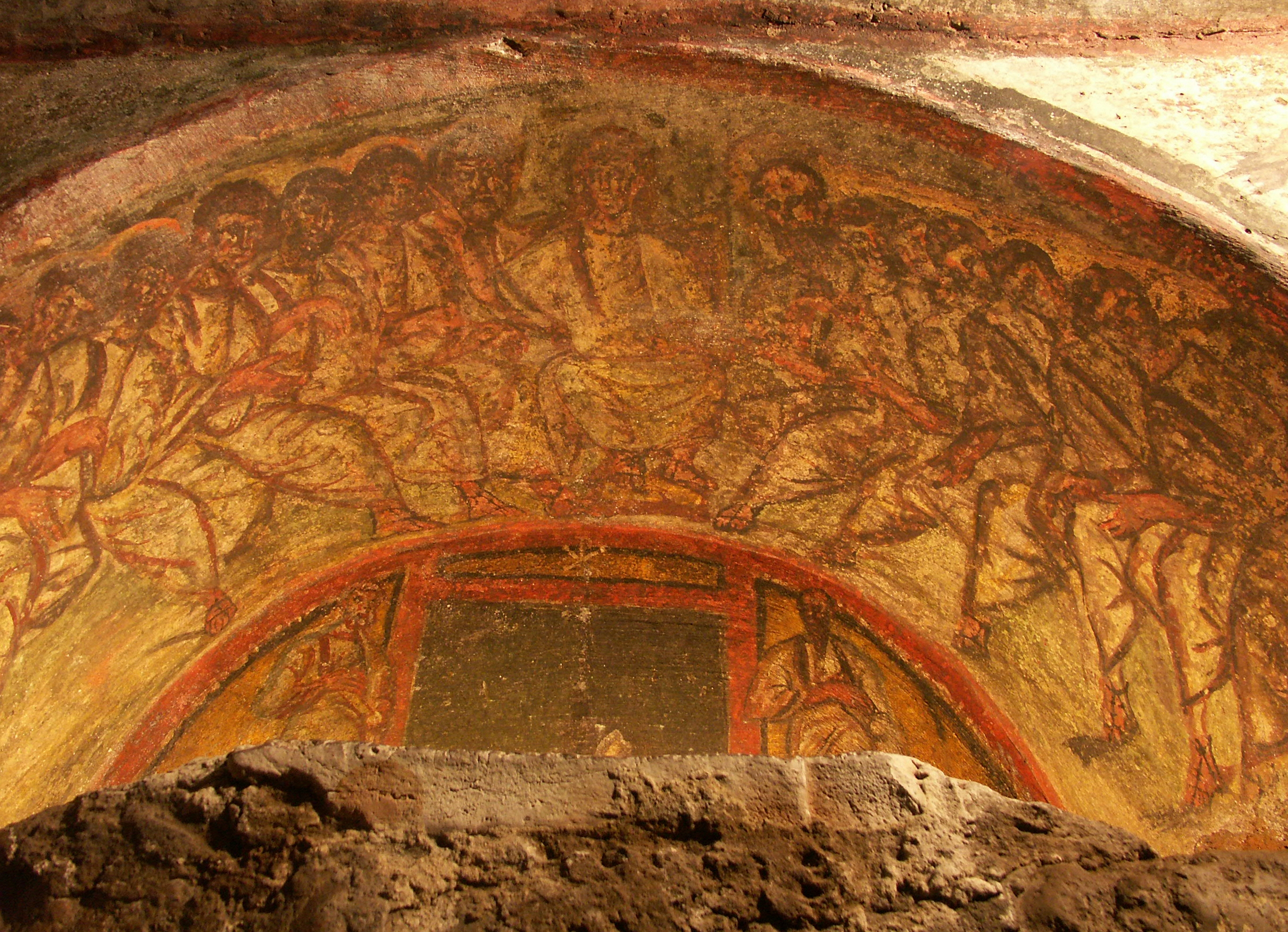
Jesus and his Twelve Apostles, fresco with the Chi-Rho symbol ☧, Catacombs of Domitilla, Rome

The term apostle comes from the Greek apóstolos (ἀπόστολος) – formed from the prefix apó- (ἀπό-, 'from') and root stéllō (στέλλω, 'I send, I depart') – originally meaning 'messenger, envoy'. It has a stronger sense than the word messenger, and is closer to a 'delegate'.

== Biblical narratives ==
Mark 6:7–13 states that Jesus initially sent out these twelve in pairs (cf. Mt 10:5–42, Lk 9:1–6) to towns in Galilee. The text states that their initial instructions were to heal the sick and drive out demons. They are also instructed to "take nothing for their journey, except a staff only: no bread, no wallet, no money in their purse, but to wear sandals, and not put on two tunics", and that if any town rejects them they ought to shake the dust off their feet as they leave, a gesture which some scholars think was meant as a contemptuous threat.

Later in the Gospels, the Twelve Apostles are described as having been commissioned to preach the Gospel to "all the nations", regardless of whether Jew or Gentile. Paul emphasized the role of the apostles in the church of God when he said that the household of God is "built upon the foundation of apostles and prophets, Christ Jesus himself being the cornerstone."

=== Calling by Jesus ===
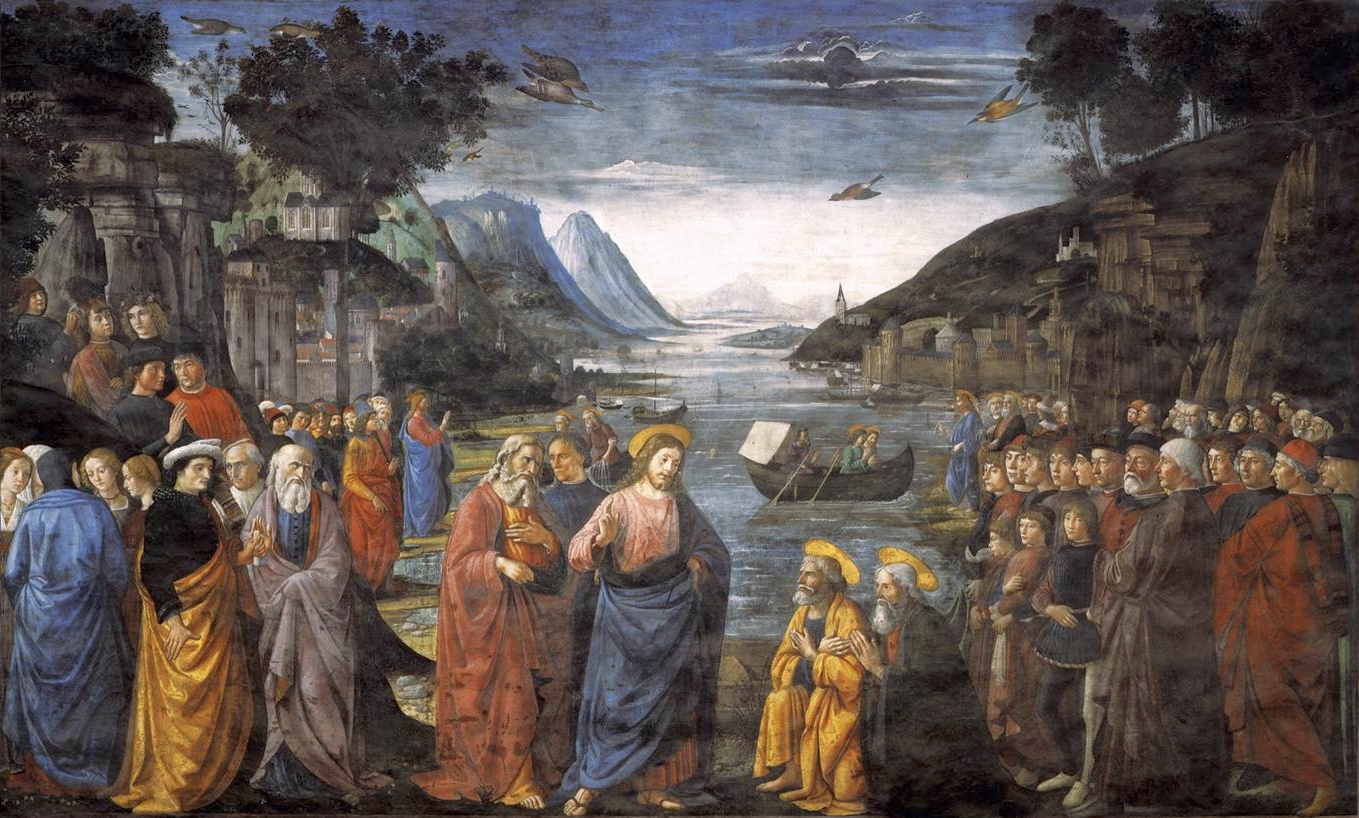
Vocation of the Apostles, a fresco in the Sistine Chapel by Domenico Ghirlandaio, 1481–82

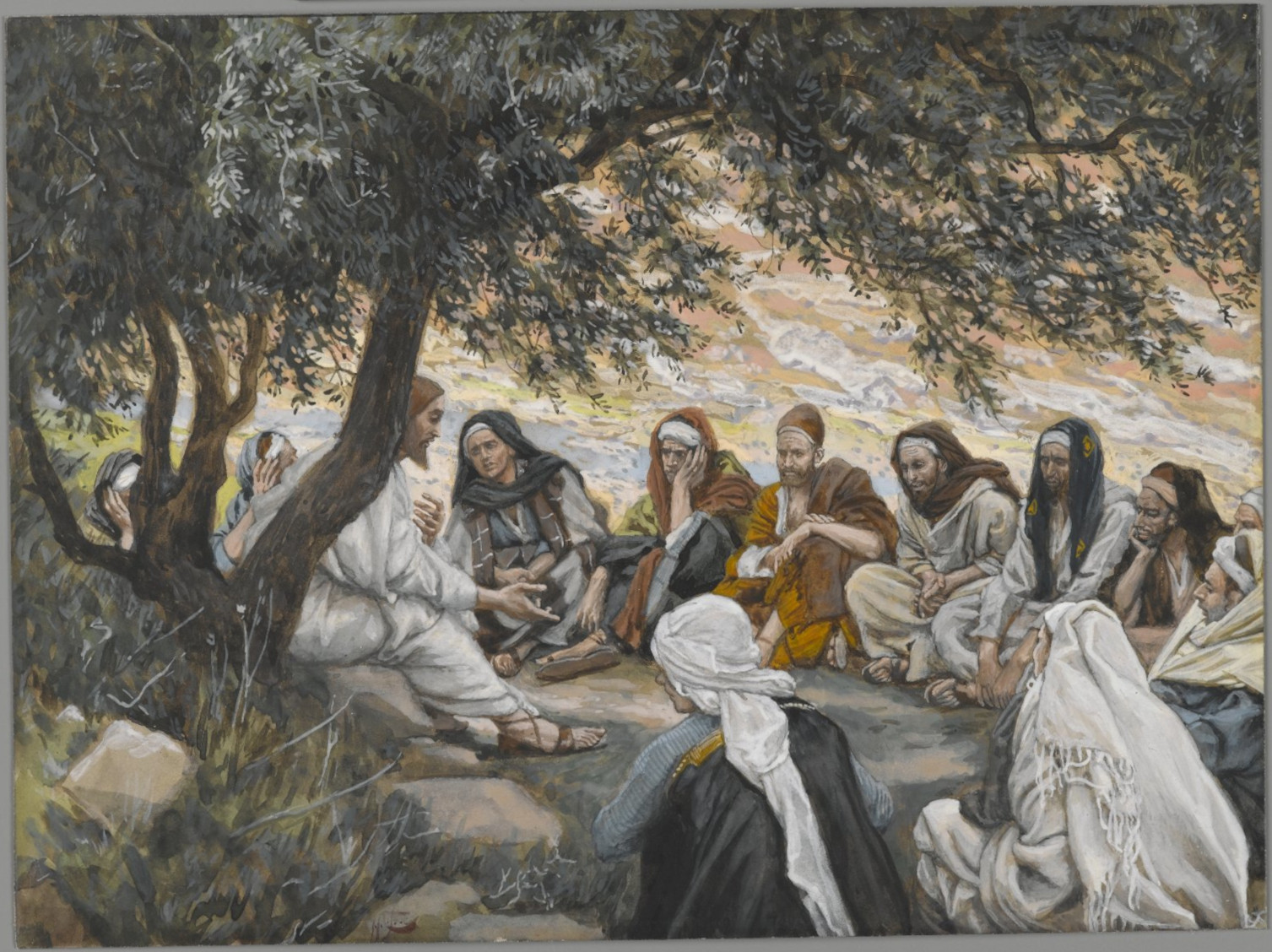
James Tissot, The Exhortation to the Apostles

All four canonical Gospels record the circumstances in which some of the disciples were recruited. According to the Gospel of John, Andrew, who was the disciple of John the Baptist, and another unnamed disciple of John the Baptist, traditionally believed to be John, upon hearing the Baptist point out Jesus as the "Lamb of God", followed Jesus and spent the day with him, thus becoming the first two disciples called by Jesus. For this reason the Eastern Orthodox Church honours Andrew with the name Protokletos, which means "the first called".

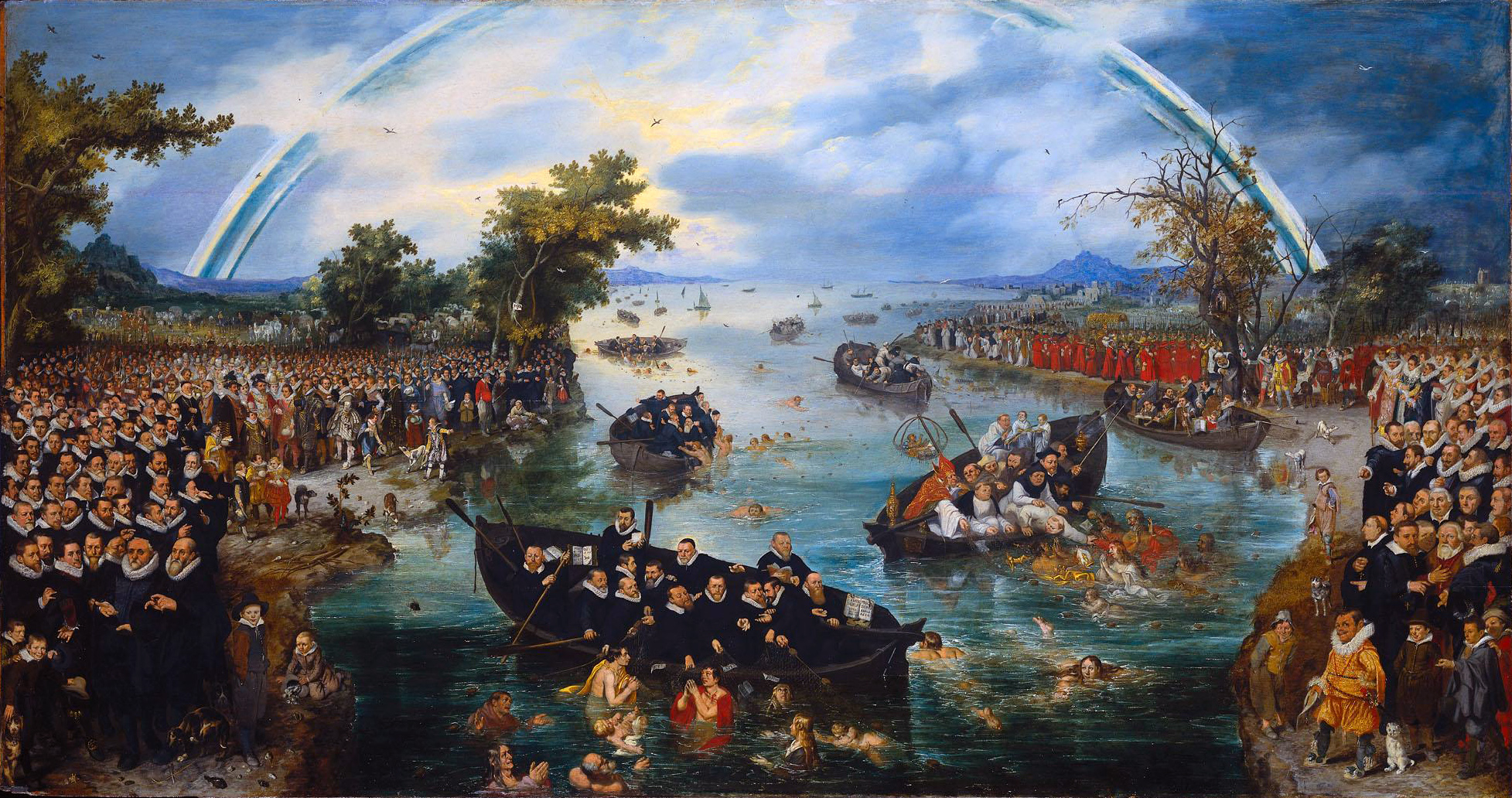
Adriaen van de Venne's Fishing for Souls, oil on panel, 1614

Matthew describes Jesus meeting James and John, also fishermen and brothers, shortly after recruiting Simon and Andrew. Matthew and Mark identify James and John as sons of Zebedee. Luke adds that James and John worked as a team with Simon and Andrew. Matthew states that at the time of the encounter, James and John were repairing their nets, but readily joined Jesus without hesitation.

This parallels the accounts of Mark and Luke, but Matthew implies that the men have also abandoned their father (since he is present in the boat they abandon behind them), and Carter feels this should be interpreted to mean that Matthew's Jesus rejected the traditional patriarchal structure of society, where the father had command over his children; most scholars interpret it to mean that Matthew intended these two to be seen as more devoted than the other pair or that Jesus expected the coming of the kingdom.

Despite Jesus only briefly requesting that the Apostles join him, they are all described as immediately consenting, even abandoning fishing nets to do so. The immediacy of their consent has been viewed as an example of divine power, although this is not stated in the text. Another explanation is that some of the disciples may have heard of Jesus beforehand, as implied by the Gospel of John, which states that Andrew was a disciple of John the Baptist, and that he and his brother started following Jesus as soon as Jesus had been baptized.

The Synoptic Gospels go on to describe that later in Jesus' ministry he noticed a tax collector in his booth. The tax collector, called Matthew in Matthew 9:9, and Levi in Mark 2:14 and Luke 5:27, is asked by Jesus to become one of his disciples. Matthew/Levi is stated to have accepted and then invited Jesus for a meal with his friends. Tax collectors were seen as villains in Jewish society, and the Pharisees are described as asking Jesus why he is having a meal with such disreputable people. The reply Jesus gave is now well known: "it is not the healthy who need a doctor, but the sick. I have not come to call the righteous, but sinners to repentance."

=== Commissioning of the Twelve Apostles ===
The commissioning of the Twelve Apostles is an episode in the ministry of Jesus that appears in the three Synoptic Gospels. It relates the initial selection of the Twelve Apostles among the disciples of Jesus.

In the Gospel of Matthew, this event takes place shortly before the miracle of the man with a withered hand. In the gospels of Mark and of Luke, it appears shortly after that miracle.

Then Jesus summoned his twelve disciples and gave them authority over unclean spirits, to cast them out, and to cure every disease and every sickness. These are the names of the twelve apostles: first, Simon, also known as Peter, and his brother Andrew; James son of Zebedee, and his brother John; Philip and Bartholomew; Thomas and Matthew the tax collector; James son of Alphaeus, and Thaddaeus; Simon the Cananaean, and Judas Iscariot, the one who betrayed him.

— Matthew 10:1–4

He went up the mountain and called to him those whom he wanted, and they came to him. And he appointed twelve, whom he also named apostles, to be with him, and to be sent out to proclaim the message, and to have authority to cast out demons. So he appointed the twelve: Simon (to whom he gave the name Peter); James son of Zebedee and John the brother of James (to whom he gave the name Boanerges, that is, Sons of Thunder); and Andrew, and Philip, and Bartholomew, and Matthew, and Thomas, and James son of Alphaeus, and Thaddaeus, and Simon the Cananaean, and Judas Iscariot, who betrayed him.

— Mark 3:13–19

One of those days Jesus went out to a mountainside to pray, and spent the night praying to God. When morning came, he called his disciples to him and chose twelve of them, whom he also designated apostles: Simon (whom he named Peter), his brother Andrew, James, John, Philip, Bartholomew, Matthew, Thomas, James son of Alphaeus, Simon who was called the Zealot, Judas son of James, and Judas Iscariot, who became a traitor.

— Luke 6:12–16

== Lists of the Twelve Apostles in the New Testament ==
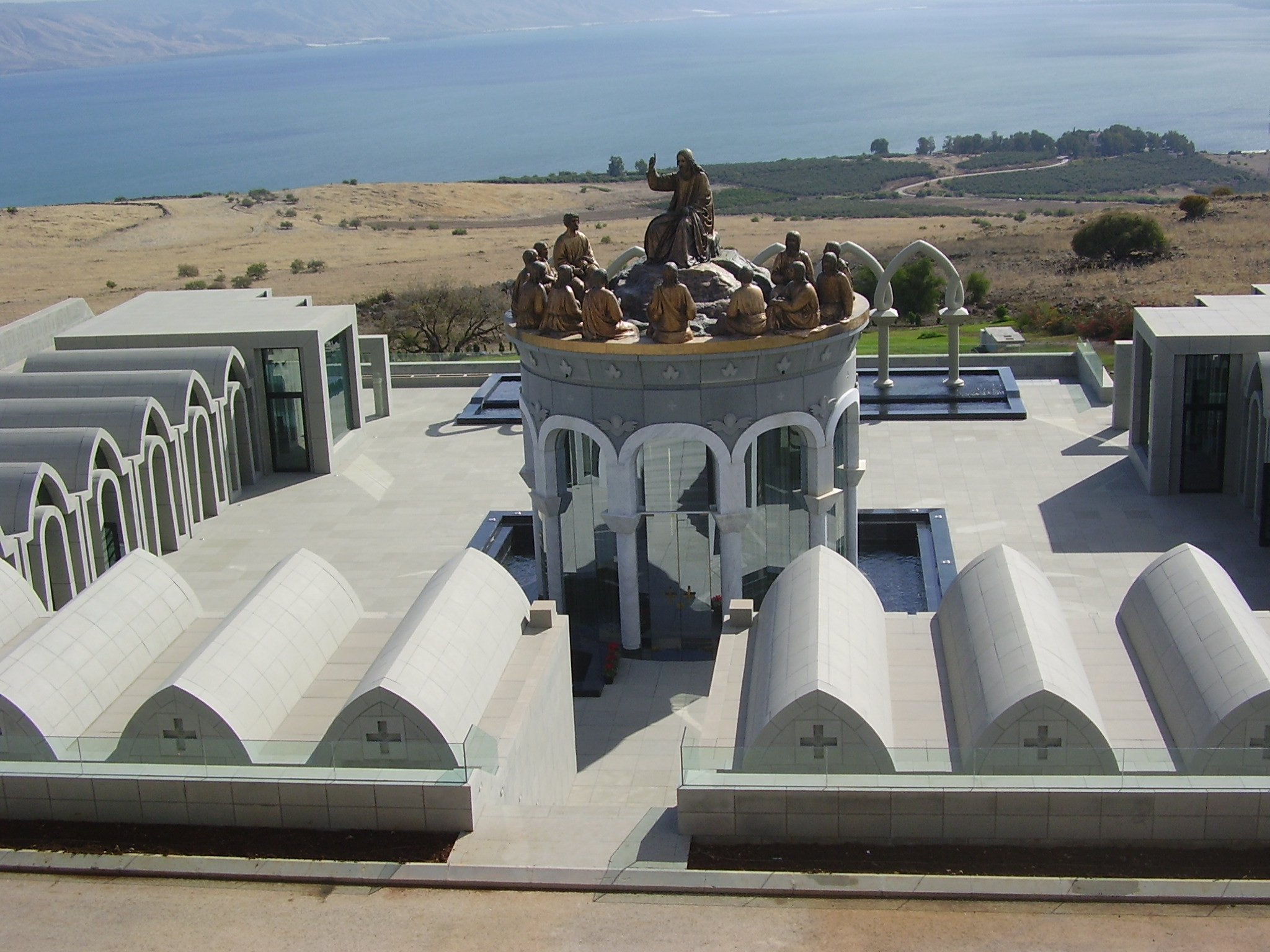
Monument of Jesus and the Twelve Apostles in Domus Galilaeae, Israel

Each of the four listings of apostles in the New Testament indicate that all the apostles were men. According to Christian tradition they were all Jews. The canonical gospels and the book of Acts give varying names of the Twelve Apostles; ancient biographies could display flexibility when reporting events, though the Synoptics were more conservative than other contemporary historians in adaptation of sources. The list in Luke mentions "Judas, the son of James" instead of "Thaddaeus". (Note: For more information, see Jude the Apostle.) All listings appear in three groupings, always with the same four apostles in each group. Each group is always led by the same apostle, although the order of the remaining three names within the group varies. Thus, Peter is always listed first, Philip is always listed fifth, and James, son of Alphaeus is always listed ninth. Judas Iscariot is always listed last.

Unlike the Synoptic Gospels, the Gospel of John does not offer a formal list of apostles. Although it refers to "the Twelve", the gospel does not present any elaboration of who these twelve actually were, and the author of the Gospel of John does not mention them all by name. There is also no separation of the terms "apostles" and "disciples" in John.

According to the New Testament there were only two pairs of brothers among the Twelve Apostles: Peter and Andrew, the sons of Jonah, as well as James and John, the sons of Zebedee. Since the father of both James, son of Alphaeus and Matthew is named Alphaeus, according to the tradition of the Eastern Orthodox Church the two were brothers as well. According to the tradition of the Catholic Church based on the writing of the Apostolic Father Papias of Hierapolis the apostles James, son of Alphaeus, and Thaddaeus were brothers and sons of Alphaeus (named also Clopas) and his wife Mary of Clopas who was the sister of the mother of Jesus. The Golden Legend, compiled by Jacobus de Voragine in the 13th century, adds to the two apostles also Simon the Zealot.

Gospel of Matthew	Gospel of Mark	Gospel of Luke	Gospel of John	Acts of the Apostles
Simon ("also known as Peter")	Simon ("to whom he gave the name Peter")	Simon ("whom he named Peter")	Simon Peter / Cephas "which is translated Peter"	Peter
Andrew ("his [Peter's] brother")	Andrew	Andrew ("his [Peter's] brother")	Andrew ("Simon Peter's brother")	Andrew
James ("son of Zebedee")	James ("son of Zebedee") / one of the "Boanerges"	James	one of the "sons of Zebedee"	James
John ("his [James's] brother")	John ("brother of James") / one of the "Boanerges"	John	one of the "sons of Zebedee" / the "disciple whom Jesus loved" (Note: This is a traditional conflation of John the Apostle with John the Evangelist, currently disputed by many textual scholars.)	John
Philip	Philip	Philip	Philip	Philip
Bartholomew	Bartholomew	Bartholomew	Nathanael	Bartholomew
Thomas	Thomas	Thomas	Thomas ("also called Didymus")	Thomas
Matthew ("the publican")	Matthew / Levi	Matthew / Levi	not mentioned	Matthew
James ("son of Alphaeus")	James ("son of Alphaeus")	James ("son of Alphaeus")	not mentioned	James ("son of Alphaeus")
Thaddaeus (or "Lebbaeus");	Thaddaeus	Judas ("son of James," referred to as brother in some translations)	Judas ("not Iscariot")	Judas ("son of James," referred to as brother in some translations)
Simon ("the Canaanite")	Simon ("the Cananaean")	Simon ("who was called the Zealot")	not mentioned	Simon ("the Zealot")
Judas Iscariot	Judas Iscariot	Judas Iscariot	Judas ("son of Simon Iscariot")	(Judas replaced by Matthias)

=== Inner circle among the Twelve Apostles ===
Peter, James son of Zebedee, and James's brother John formed an informal triumvirate among the Twelve Apostles in the Gospels. Jesus invited them to be the only apostles present on three notable occasions during his public ministry: the Raising of Jairus' daughter, the Transfiguration, and the Agony in the Garden of Gethsemane.

At the time of the Early Christian Church as a leading trio among the apostles were recognized Peter, John and James, brother of Jesus, known collectively as the three Pillars of the Church. According to the tradition of the Catholic Church based on the writing of Jerome this James is identified with the apostle James, son of Alphaeus.

Two of the leading triumvirate, Peter and John, were additionally sent by Jesus into the city to make preparation for the final Passover meal (the Last Supper), and were also the only two sent by the collective apostles to visit the newly converted believers in Samaria. If John is to be identified with the disciple whom Jesus loved, then it was also only Peter and John who followed behind Jesus after his capture in the Garden of Gethsemane, and who ran to the empty tomb after Mary Magdalene bore witness to the resurrection of Jesus.

=== Replacement of Judas Iscariot ===
After Judas betrayed Jesus (and then in guilt committed suicide before Christ's resurrection, one Gospel recounts), the apostles numbered eleven. The group is referred to as "the eleven" in Mark 16:14 (part of the "longer ending" of Mark) and in Luke 24:9,33. In Acts 1:26 they are "the eleven apostles", in Matthew 28:16 they are "the eleven disciples". When Jesus had been taken up from them, in preparation for the coming of the Holy Spirit that he had promised them, Peter advised the brethren:

Judas, who was guide to those who took Jesus... For he was numbered with us, and received his portion in this ministry... For it is written in the book of Psalms, "Let his habitation be made desolate, Let no one dwell therein", and, "Let another take his office"... So one of the men who have accompanied us during all the time that the Lord Jesus went in and out among us, beginning from the baptism of John until the day he was taken up from us, must become with us a witness to his resurrection.

— Acts 1:15–22

So, between the Ascension of Jesus and the day of Pentecost, the remaining apostles elected a twelfth apostle by casting lots, a traditional Israelite way to determine the will of God (see Proverbs 16:33). The lot fell upon Matthias according to Acts 1:26.

Paul the Apostle, in his First Epistle to the Corinthians, appears to give the first historical reference to the Twelve Apostles: "For I delivered to you as of first importance what I also received: that Christ died for our sins in accordance with the Scriptures, that he was buried, that he was raised on the third day in accordance with the Scriptures, and that he appeared to Cephas, then to the twelve" (1 Cor 15:3–5).

=== Other apostles mentioned in the New Testament ===
The New Testament also uses the term apostle in an expanded sense. As the Catholic Encyclopedia states, "It is at once evident that in a Christian sense, everyone who had received a mission from God, or Christ, to man could be called 'Apostle'"; thus extending the original sense beyond the twelve.

Person called apostle	Where in Scripture	Notes
Paul	Throughout Acts, the Pauline epistles and 2 Peter 3:15	See section below
Barnabas	Acts 14:14	"when the apostles Barnabas and Paul heard about it"
James the Just, the brother of Jesus	1 Corinthians 15:7, Galatians 1:19	Galatians 1:19: "But I did not see any other of the apostles except James, the Lord's brother."
Andronicus and Junia	Romans 16:7	Paul states that Andronicus and Junia were "of note among the apostles." This has been traditionally interpreted in one of two ways: That Andronicus and Junia were "of note among the apostles," that is, distinguished apostles.; That Andronicus and Junia were "well known among the apostles" meaning "well known to the apostles"; If the first view is correct then Paul may be referring to a female apostle – the Greek name (Ἰουνίαν, Iounian) is in the accusative and could refer either to Junia (a woman) or to Junias (a man) which are both first declension. Later manuscripts add accents to make it unambiguously Junias; however, while "Junia" was a common name, "Junias" was not, and both options are favored by different Bible translations. In the second view, it is believed that Paul is simply making mention of the outstanding character of these two people which was acknowledged by the apostles. Historically it has been virtually impossible to tell which of the two views were correct. The second view, in recent years, has been defended from a scholarly perspective by Daniel Wallace and Michael Burer.

==== The seventy disciples ====
The "seventy disciples" or "seventy-two disciples" (known in the Eastern Christian traditions as the "Seventy Apostles") were early emissaries of Jesus mentioned in the Gospel of Luke. According to Luke, the only gospel in which they appear, Jesus appointed them and sent them out in pairs on a specific mission which is detailed in the text.

In Western Christianity, they are usually referred to as disciples, whereas in Eastern Christianity they are usually referred to as apostles. Using the original Greek words, both titles are descriptive, as an apostle is one sent on a mission (the Greek uses the verb form: apesteilen) whereas a disciple is a student, but the two traditions differ on the scope of the words apostle and disciple.

==== Paul, Apostle of the Gentiles ====
Although not one of the apostles commissioned during the life of Jesus, Paul, a Jew also named Saul, claimed a special commission from the post-ascension Jesus as "the apostle of the Gentiles", to spread the gospel message after his conversion. In his writings, the epistles to Christian churches throughout the Levant, Paul did not restrict the term "apostle" to the twelve, and often refers to his mentor Barnabas as an apostle.

In his writings, Paul, although not one of the original twelve, described himself as an apostle. He was called by the resurrected Jesus himself during his Road to Damascus event. With Barnabas, he undertook the role of apostle in the church.

Since Paul claimed to have received a gospel not from teachings of the Twelve Apostles but solely and directly through personal revelations from the post-ascension Jesus, after Jesus's death and resurrection (rather than before like the twelve), Paul was often obliged to defend his apostolic authority (1 Cor. 9:1 "Am I not an apostle?") and proclaim that he had seen and was anointed by Jesus while on the road to Damascus.

Paul considered himself perhaps inferior to the other apostles because he had originally persecuted Christ's followers while thinking he was not in the least inferior to those "super-apostles" and not lacking in "knowledge".

Paul referred to himself as the apostle of the Gentiles. According to Paul's account in his Epistle to the Galatians, James, Peter and John in Jerusalem accepted the "grace" given to Paul and agreed that Paul and Barnabas should go to the Gentiles (specifically those not circumcised) and the three apostles who "seemed to be pillars" to the circumcised. Despite the Little Commission of Matthew 10, the Twelve Apostles did not limit their mission to solely Jews as Cornelius the Centurion is widely considered the first Gentile convert and he was converted by Peter, and the Great Commission of the resurrected Jesus is specifically to "all nations".

== Deaths ==
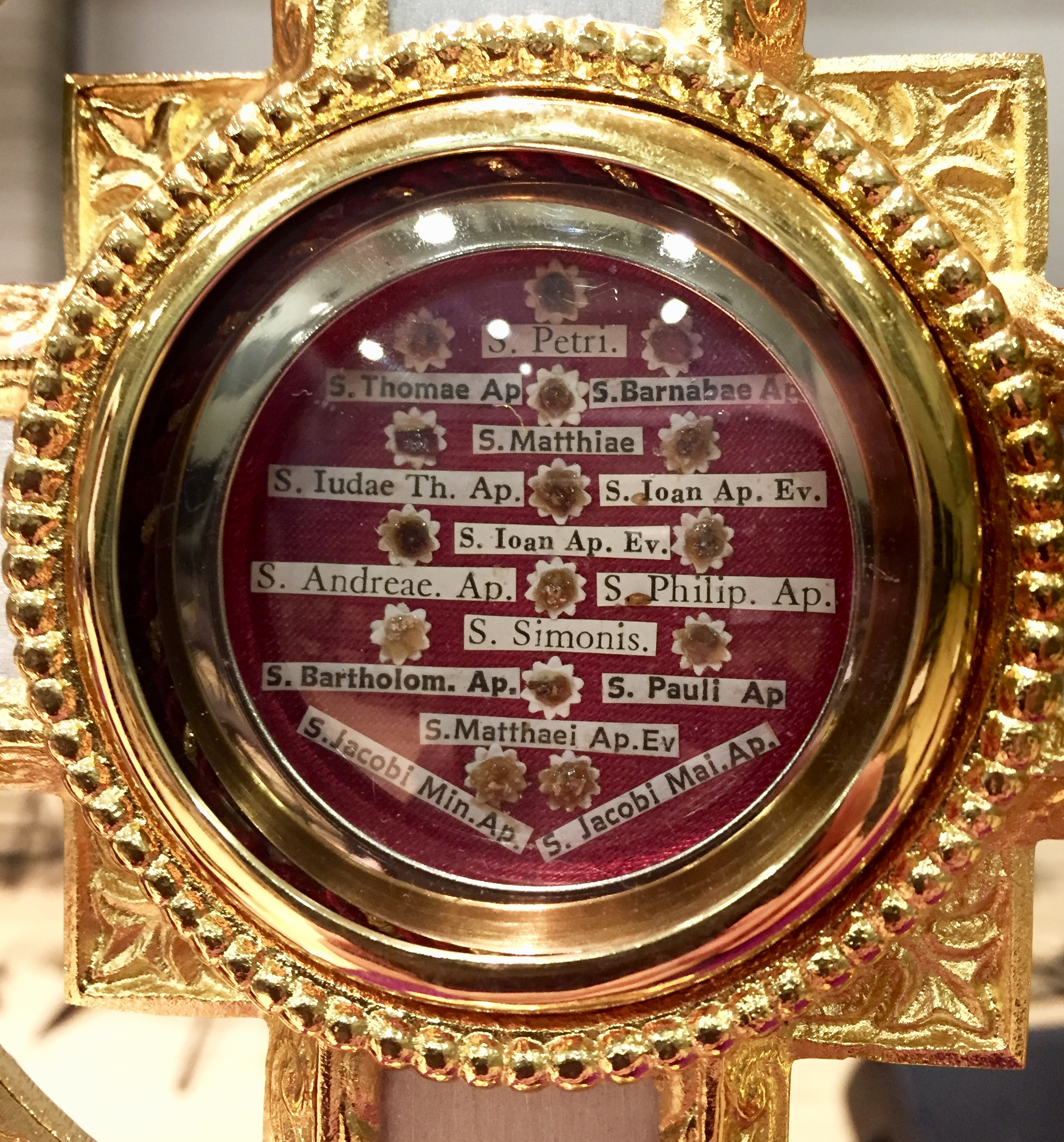
Relics of the apostles in 2017, while they were in Utah during the Relic Tour

Of the Twelve Apostles to hold the title after Matthias' selection, Christian tradition has generally passed down that all of the Twelve Apostles except John were martyred. It is traditionally believed that John survived all of them, living to old age and dying of natural causes at Ephesus sometime after AD 98, during the reign of Trajan. However, only the death of his brother James who became the first Apostle to die in c. AD 44 is described in the New Testament. (Acts 12:1–2)

Matthew 27:5 says that Judas Iscariot threw the silver he received for betraying Jesus down in the Temple, then went and hanged himself. Acts 1:18 says that he purchased a field, then "falling headlong he burst open in the middle and all his bowels gushed out".

According to the 18th-century historian Edward Gibbon, early Christians (second half of the second century and first half of the third century) believed that only Peter, Paul, and James, son of Zebedee, were martyred. Some believe that remainder, or even all, of the claims of martyred apostles do not rely upon historical or biblical evidence, but only on late legends. Others are more favorable to the martyrdom traditions, with one example being academic Sean McDowell. In a review of apostolic martyrdom accounts, he finds that of the Twelve, three likely died natural deaths (John, Matthew, and Phillip), while the remaining nine either were most likely martyrs, or their martyrdom was as plausible as not. He also finds Paul and James, brother of Jesus to be martyrs.

=== Relics and burial sites ===
Relics of the apostles are claimed by various churches, many in Europe.

- Andrew: buried in Cathedral of Saint Andrew, Patras, Greece
- Bartholomew: buried in the Basilica of Benevento, Italy, or Basilica of St. Bartholomew on the Island, Rome, Italy
- James the Great: buried in Santiago de Compostela Cathedral in Santiago de Compostela, Galicia, Spain
- James, son of Alphaeus: buried in the Cathedral of St. James in Jerusalem or the Church of the Holy Apostles in Rome.
- John: no relics. The opening of his tomb (in the Basilica of St. John, Ephesus, Turkey) during Constantine the Great's reign yielded no bones, giving rise to the belief that his body was assumed into heaven.
- Judas Iscariot: buried at Akeldama near Jerusalem (per the Gospel of Matthew and Acts of the Apostles).
- Jude Thaddeus: buried in St. Peter's Basilica under the St. Joseph altar with St. Simon the Zealot; two bones (relics) located at National Shrine of St. Jude in Chicago; other relics claimed by Reims Cathedral and Toulouse Cathedral.
- Matthew: buried in the Salerno Cathedral, Italy.
- Matthias: buried in the St. Matthias' Abbey in Trier, Germany.
- Paul: relics located in the Basilica of Saint Paul Outside the Walls in Rome; the skull located in the Archbasilica of Saint John Lateran, alongside the skull of St. Peter.
- Peter: buried in St. Peter's Basilica in Vatican City, Rome, Italy; the skull located in the Archbasilica of Saint John Lateran, alongside the skull of St. Paul.
- Philip: buried in the Church of the Holy Apostles in Rome or possibly Hierapolis, modern Turkey.
- Simon the Zealot: buried in St. Peter's Basilica in Rome under the St. Joseph altar with St. Jude.
- Thomas: buried in the San Thome Basilica in Chennai, India or in the Basilica of St. Thomas the Apostle in Ortona, Italy.

== Legacy ==
By the 2nd century AD, association with the apostles was esteemed as an evidence of authority. Churches that are believed to have been founded by one of the apostles are known as apostolic sees.

Paul's epistles were accepted as scripture, and two of the four canonical gospels were associated with apostles, as were other New Testament works. Various Christian texts, such as the Didache and the Apostolic Constitutions, were attributed to the apostles. The Apostles' Creed, popular in the West, was alleged to have been composed by the apostles themselves.

Bishops traced their lines of succession back to individual apostles, who were said to have dispersed from Jerusalem and established churches across great territories. Christian bishops have traditionally claimed authority deriving, by apostolic succession, from the Twelve Apostles.

Early Church Fathers who came to be associated with apostles – such as Pope Clement I with St. Peter – are referred to as the Apostolic Fathers.

== See also ==
- Apostle (Latter Day Saints)
- Apostles' Fast
- Companions of the Prophet
- Council of Jerusalem
- Council of Twelve Apostles
- Disciples of Jesus in Islam
- Dispersion of the Apostles
- Equal-to-apostles
