= National Shrine of Saint Jude =

National Shrine of Saint Jude may refer to:

- National Shrine of Saint Jude (England)
- National Shrine of Saint Jude (United States)
- National Shrine of Saint Jude (Philippines)
