= National Shrine of Saint Jude (United States) =

Catholic shrine

Coordinates: 41.73043°N 87.54667°W

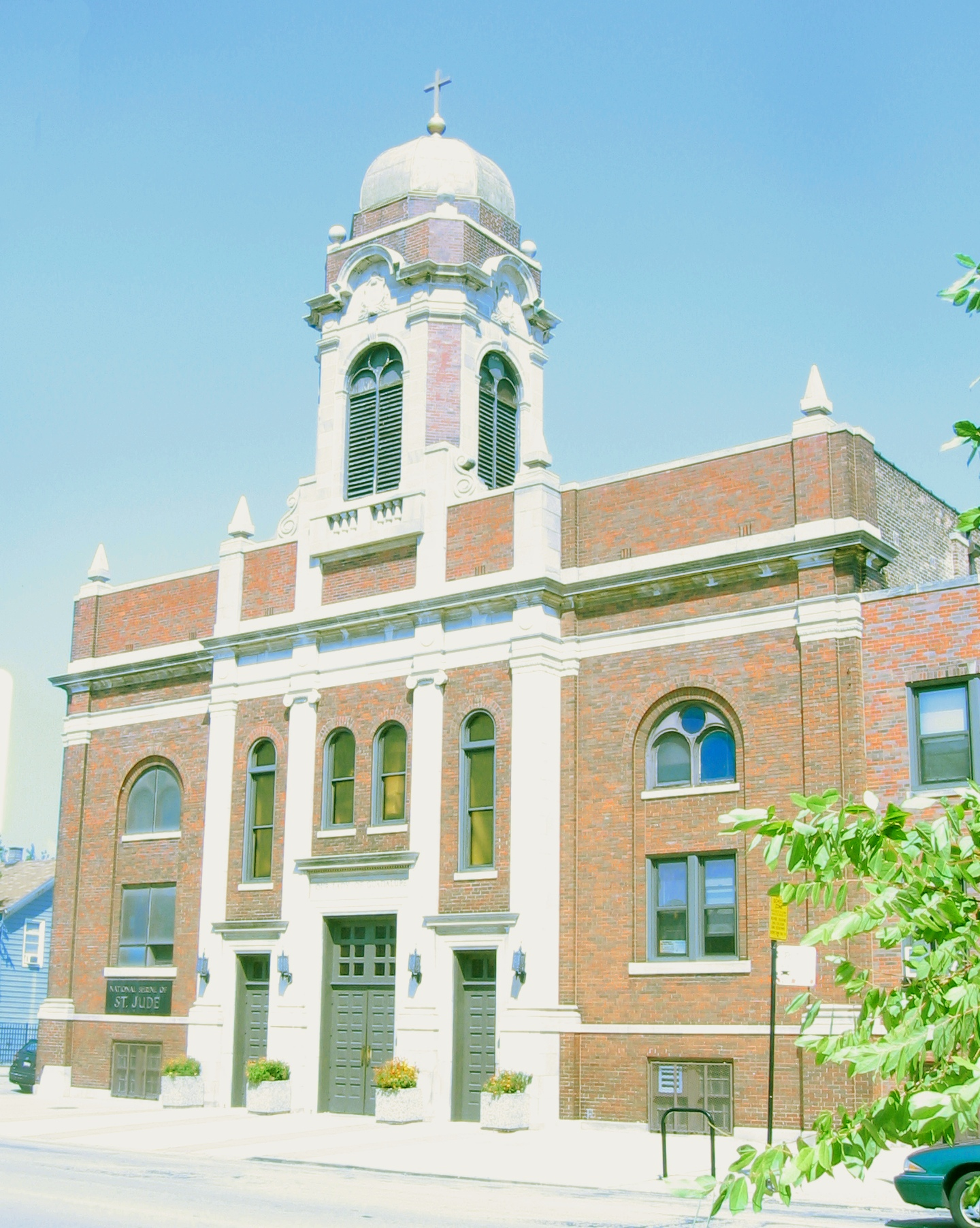
Our Lady of Guadelupe church, South Chicago, Chicago

The National Shrine of Saint Jude, in Our Lady of Guadalupe Church in Chicago, Illinois, is a shrine to one of Jesus' 12 apostles and Roman Catholic saint Saint Jude. It is a place of pilgrimage for Catholics in the United States and other countries, and is part of a parish served by the Claretians, who continue to maintain the Shrine.

== History ==
In 1923 a larger number of Mexican workers were brought to South Chicago from Fort Worth, Texas by Illinois Steel. The mission chapel of Our Lady of Guadalupe was founded by Father William T. Kane, SJ. When Kane retired for health reasons shortly thereafter, Cardinal George Mundelein entrusted the mission to the Claretians in 1924.

The national shrine of St. Jude was founded by Father James Tort, C.M.F., pastor of Our Lady of Guadalupe Church in Chicago, Illinois, United States. Father Tort was born in Barcelona and had served in the Canary Islands and Mexico. He fled Mexico in 1914, and worked for a time in Texas and Arizona, before becoming pastor of the Guadalupe mission in 1927.

Many of Tort’s parishioners were laborers in the nearby steel mills, which were drastically cutting back their workforces early in 1929. This cutback was the precursor of the Stock Market crash. Tort was saddened to see that about 90% of his parishioners were without jobs and in difficult financial situations.

Tort was devoted to Saint Jude Thaddeus. In an effort to lift the spirits of his parishioners, Tort began regular devotions to Saint Jude. The first novena honoring the saint was held on February 17, 1929. During the Depression of the 1930s and World War II, thousands of men, women, and children attended novenas at the shrine and devotion to the patron saint of desperate causes spread throughout the country.
