= Adriaen van de Venne =

Dutch painter

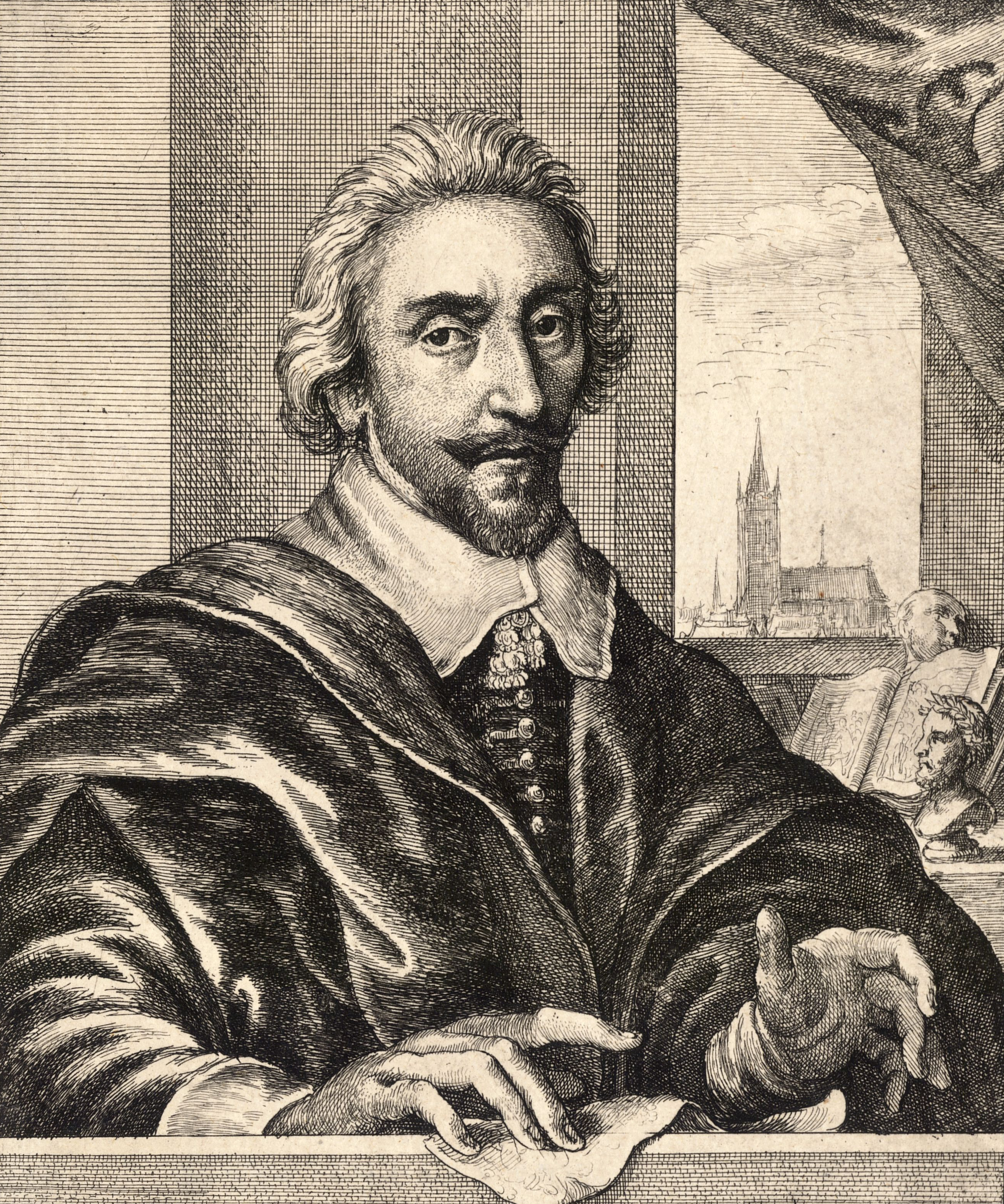
- Self-portrait engraved by Wenceslas Hollar.
- Born: Adriaen van de Venne; 1589; Delft
- Died: 12 November 1662 (aged 73); The Hague
- Known for: Painting, Engraving, Emblem books
- Movement: Baroque

Adriaen Pietersz van de Venne (1589 – 12 November 1662), was a versatile Dutch Golden Age painter of allegories, genre subjects, and portraits, as well as a miniaturist, book illustrator, designer of political satires, and versifier.

== Biography ==
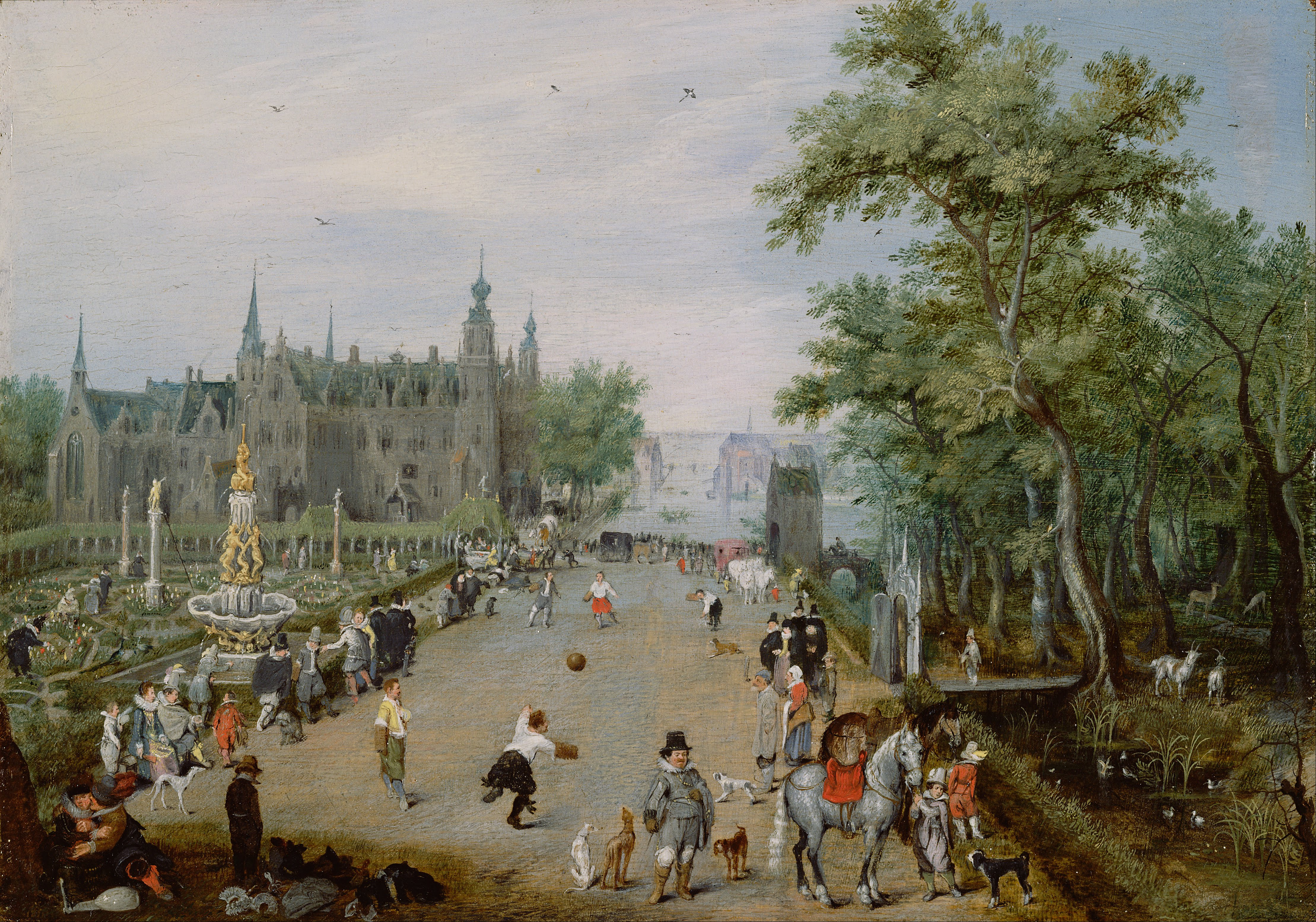
Before a Country Palace

Van de Venne was born in Delft. According to Houbraken he learned Latin in Leiden. He learned to paint from the master goldsmith and painter Simon de Valk, and afterwards learned engraving from Jeronimus van Diest, a good painter of grisailles. He then moved to Middelburg in 1614 where he was influenced by Jan Brueghel the Elder and Pieter Brueghel the Elder. His political painting Fishing for Souls, 1614, is an ironic commentary on the Catholic and Protestant troubles of the Eighty Years War that split the border between the Northern from the Southern Netherlands along the Schelde river, very close to his home in Middleburg. When he painted this picture, the Twelve Years' Truce was in effect since 1609. The influence of Jan Brueghel the Elder is particularly evident in this allegory of religious fanaticism.

From 1620 until his death van de Venne made many grisailles and engravings of genre subjects, featuring peasants, beggars, thieves and fools as illustrations of current proverbs and sayings, mostly by Jacob Cats. This work made him famous during his lifetime, and remained popular throughout the 18th century after his death.

Van de Venne also worked as a book illustrator and print designer. Van de Venne moved to The Hague and joined the Guild of Saint Luke in 1625, taking the position of dean in 1637. He was a founding member of Confrerie Pictura, a group bent on improving the independent status and social position of the artist in Dutch society by encouraging a more academic approach to the arts. He died in The Hague.

Gallery

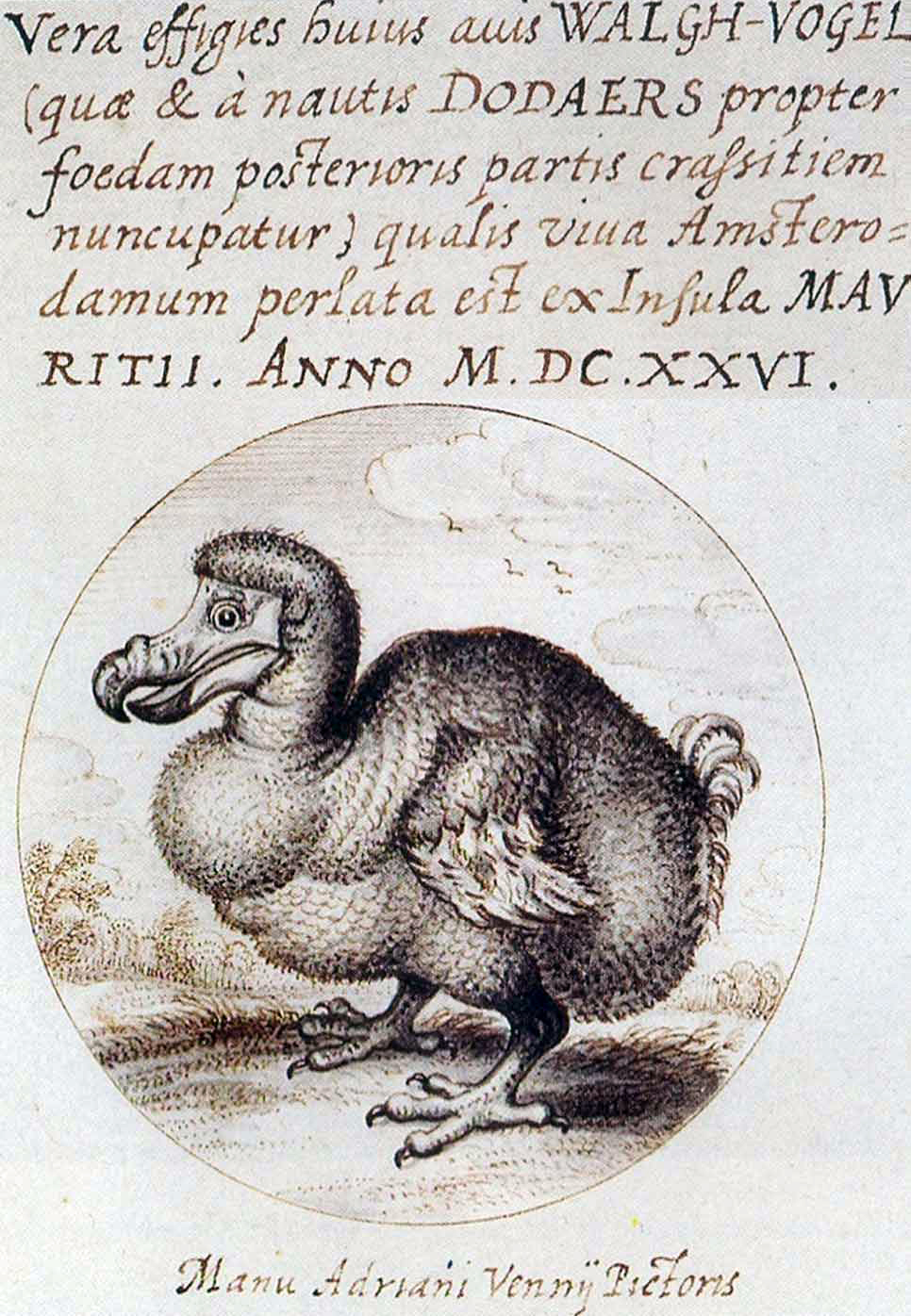
A Dodo (1626)

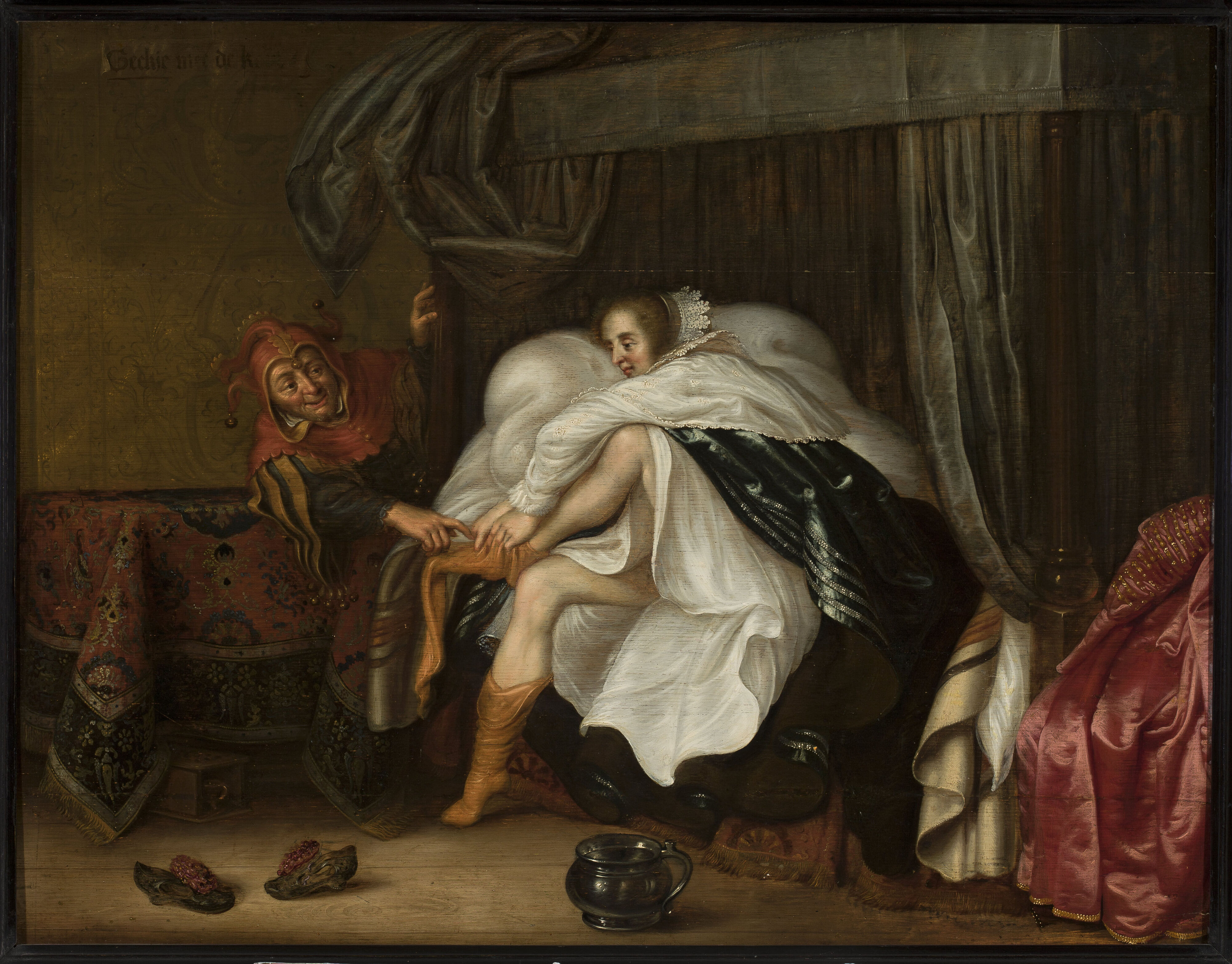
Woman and a jester. (1630s)

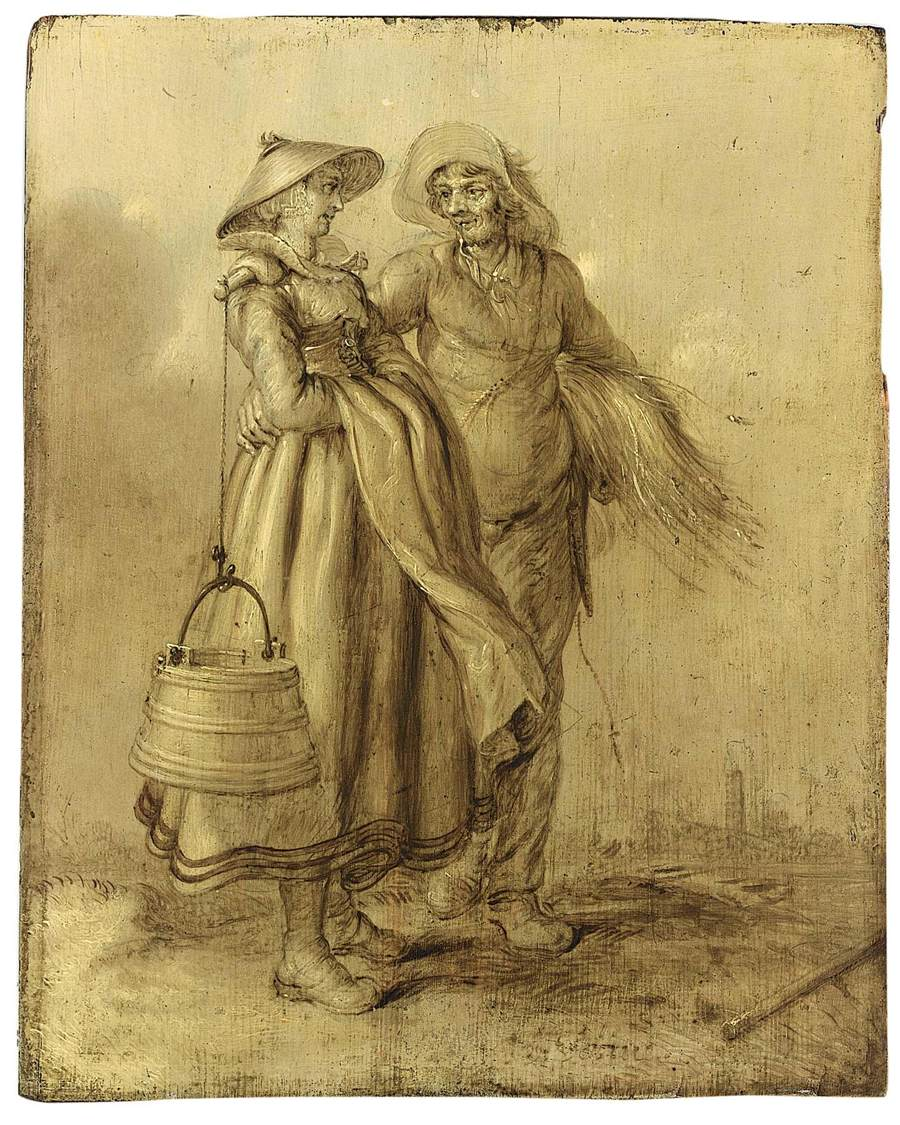
An Amorous Peasant Couple Conversing (1631)

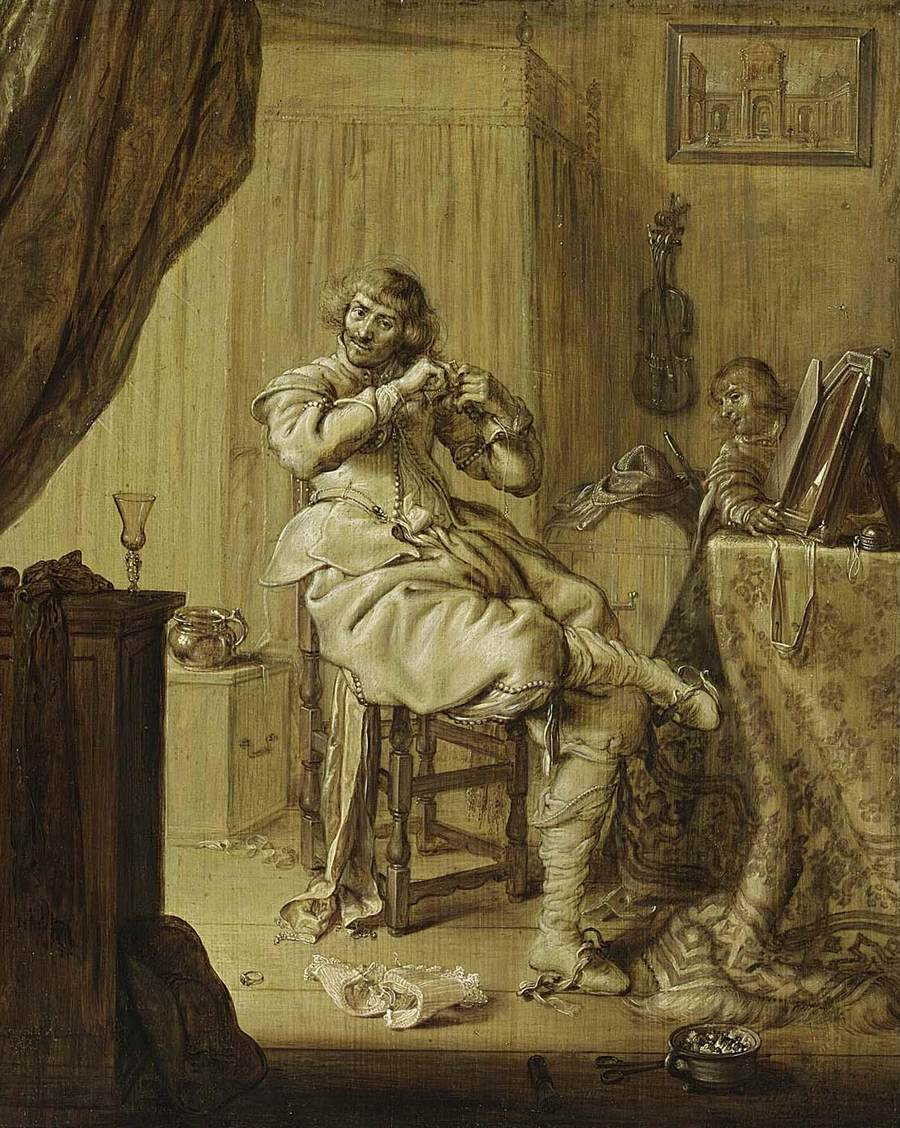
A Cavalier at His Dressing Table (1631)
Gallery

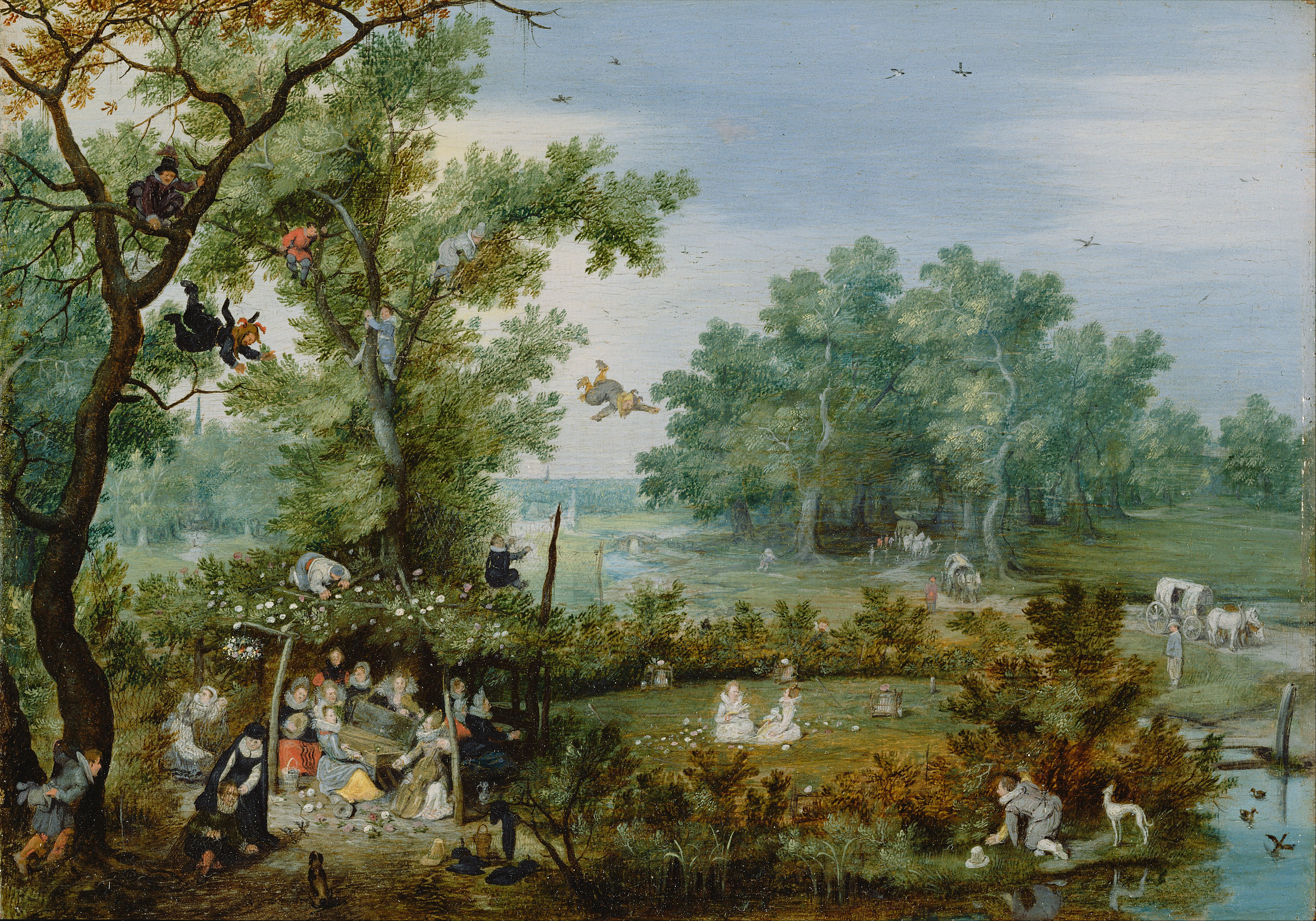
A Merry Company in an Arbor

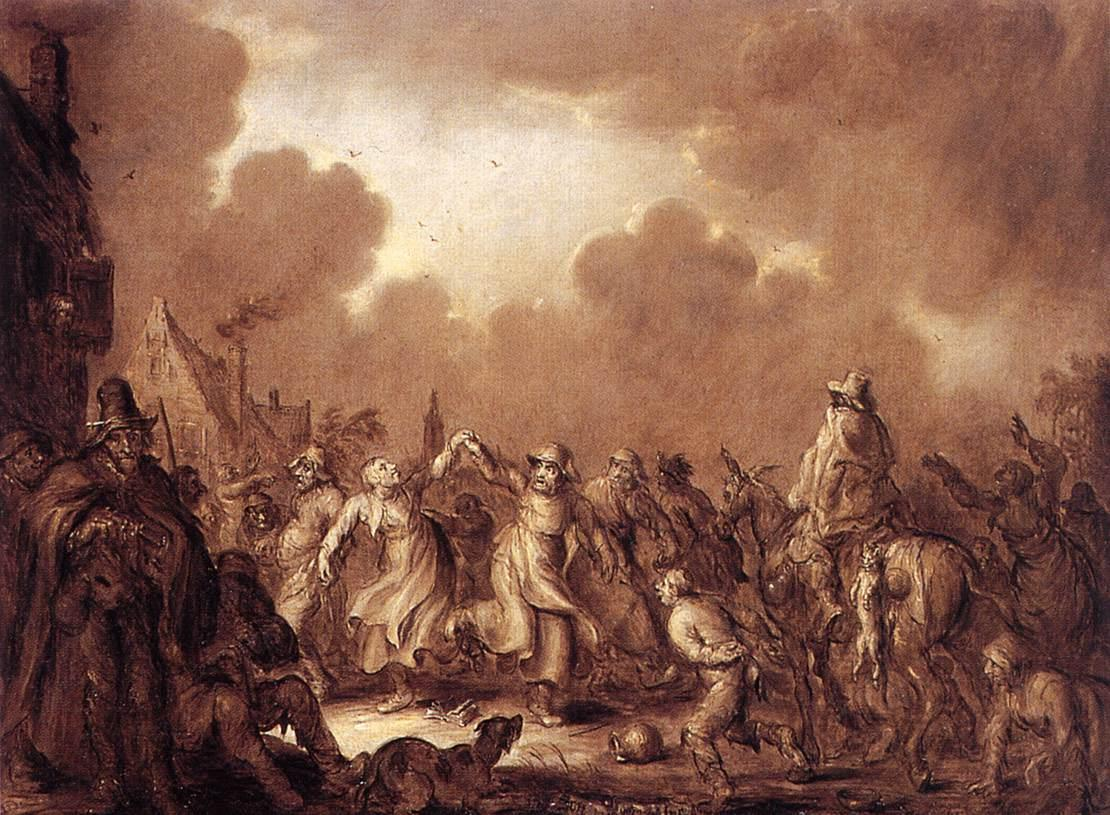
Fools Have the Most Fun

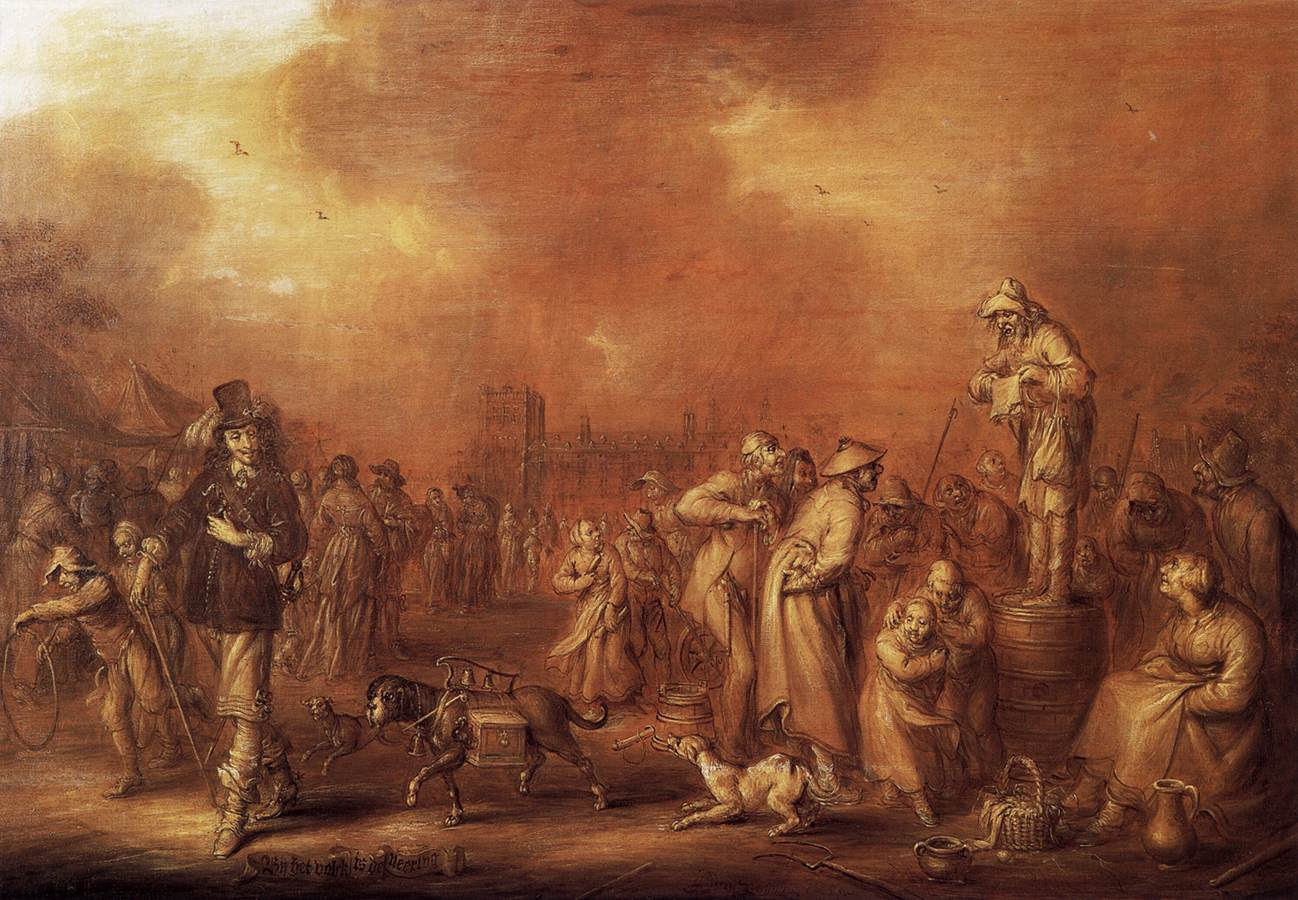
Where There Are People Money May Be Made, 1652 (private collection)

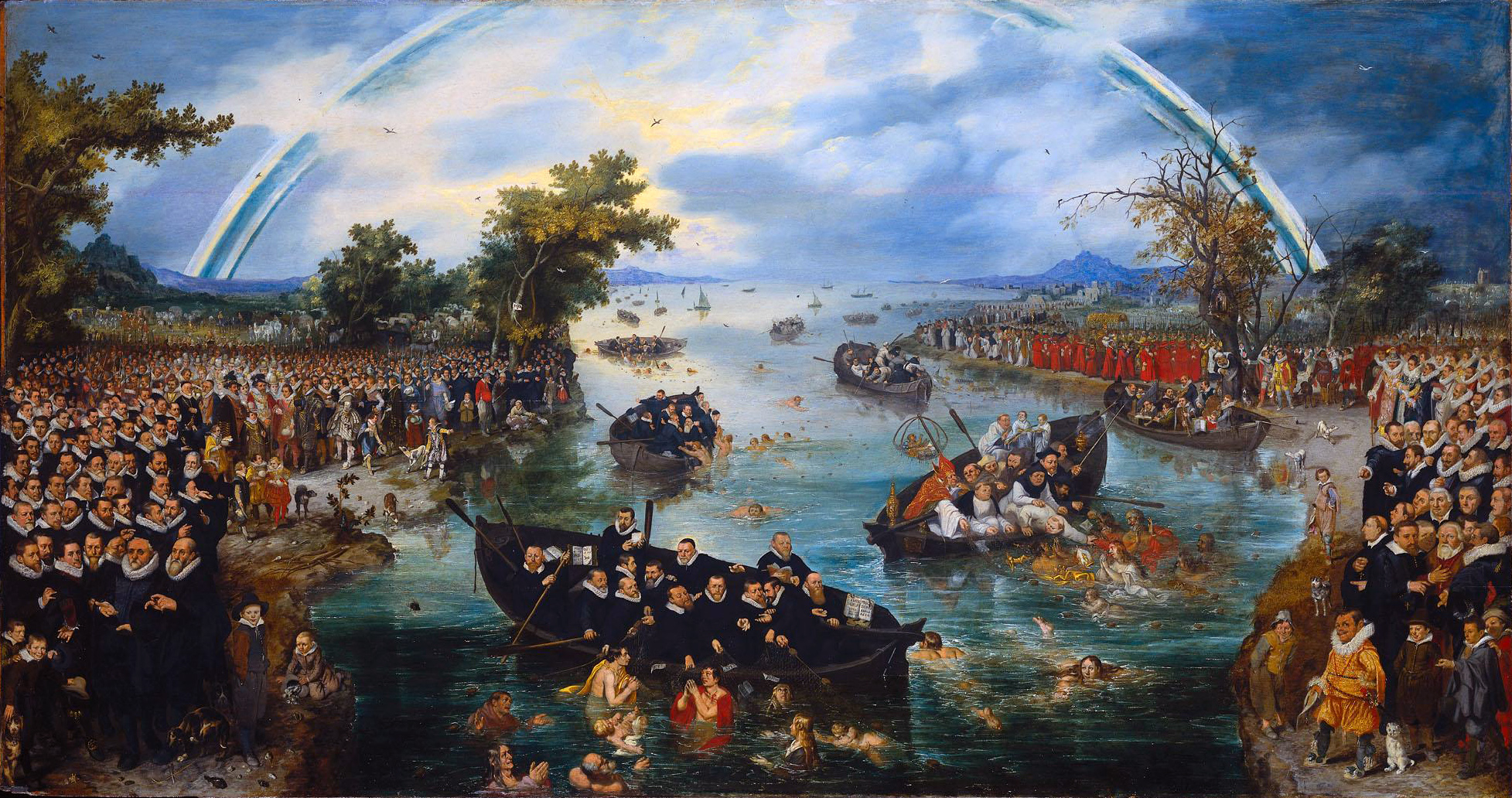
Fishing for Souls (Zielenvisserij), 1614, a satirical allegory of Protestant-Catholic struggles for souls during the Dutch Revolt (Rijksmuseum)

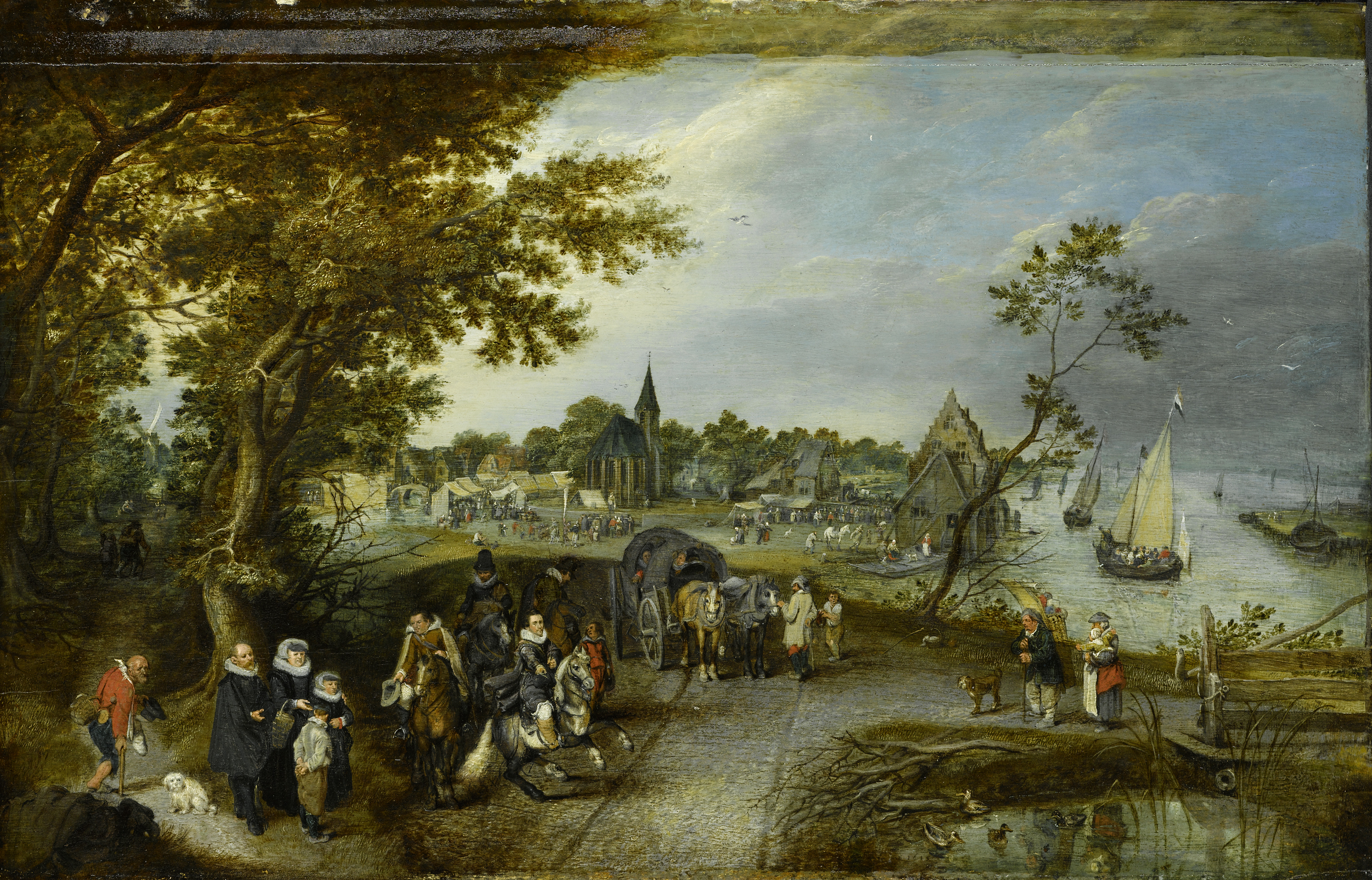
Landscape with figures

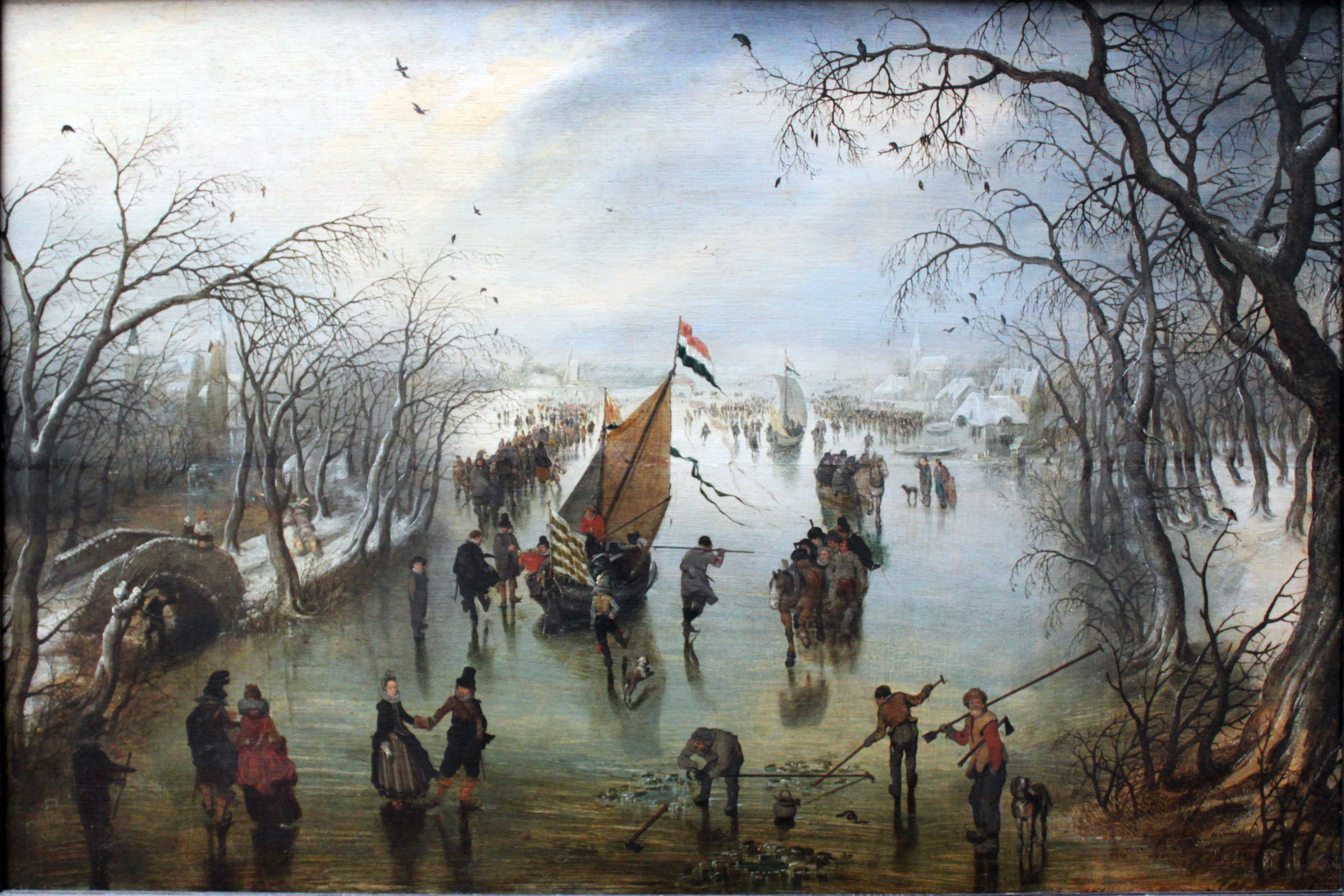
Winter
