= Fishing for Souls =

1614 painting by Adriaen van de Venne

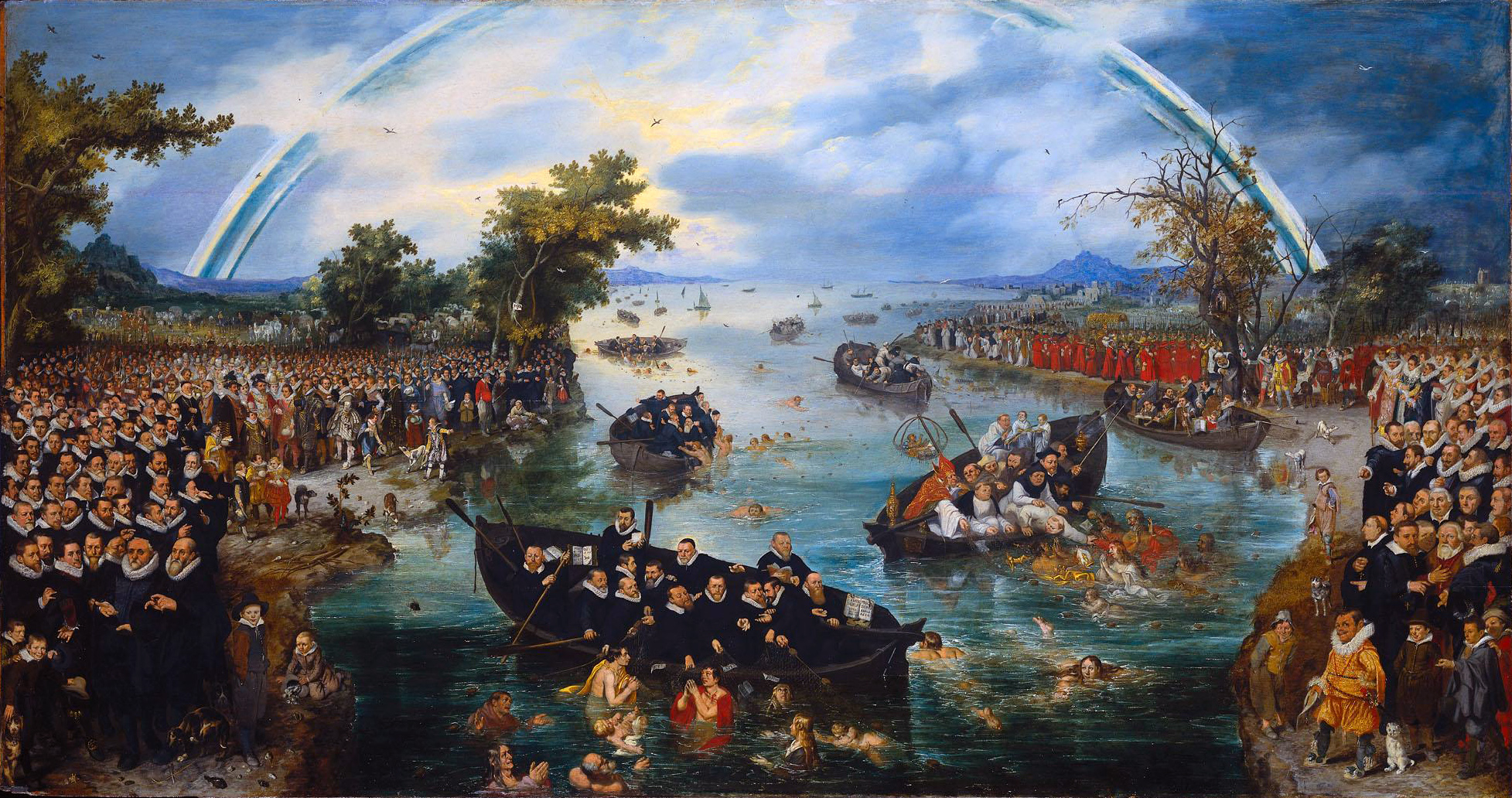
- Artist: Adriaen van de Venne
- Year: 1614
- Medium: Oil on panel
- Dimensions: 98.5 cm × 187.8 cm (38.8 in × 73.9 in)
- Location: Rijksmuseum, Amsterdam

Fishing for Souls is a 1614 oil on panel painting by the Dutch Golden Age artist Adriaen van de Venne in the collection of the Rijksmuseum.

== Painting ==
Fishing for Souls shows an allegory of the jealousy between the various religious denominations during the Twelve Years' Truce between the Dutch Republic and Spain. The river signifies the split between the Northern and the Southern Netherlands that occurred with the Beeldenstorm. In the original painting the Protestant fishermen had successfully fished up some believers while the Catholic nets were empty. The "souls" near the Catholic boats were added later.

On the left bank are the two princes of Orange behind an orange tree branch; Maurice and Frederick Henry. They are accompanied by Frederick V, Elector Palatine, King James I of England and the young Louis XIII of France with his mother Marie de' Medici. On the right bank of the river are the Catholic cardinals carrying their pope accompanied by Archduke Albert and Isabella Clara Eugenia. The various attributes of the fishermen (nets, boats, etc.) are labelled with Latin text to clarify the meaning. A large fly is painted on as a trompe-l'œil wink to Jan Brueghel the Elder, who created many similar amusing allegories with visual jokes in them.

== Provenance ==
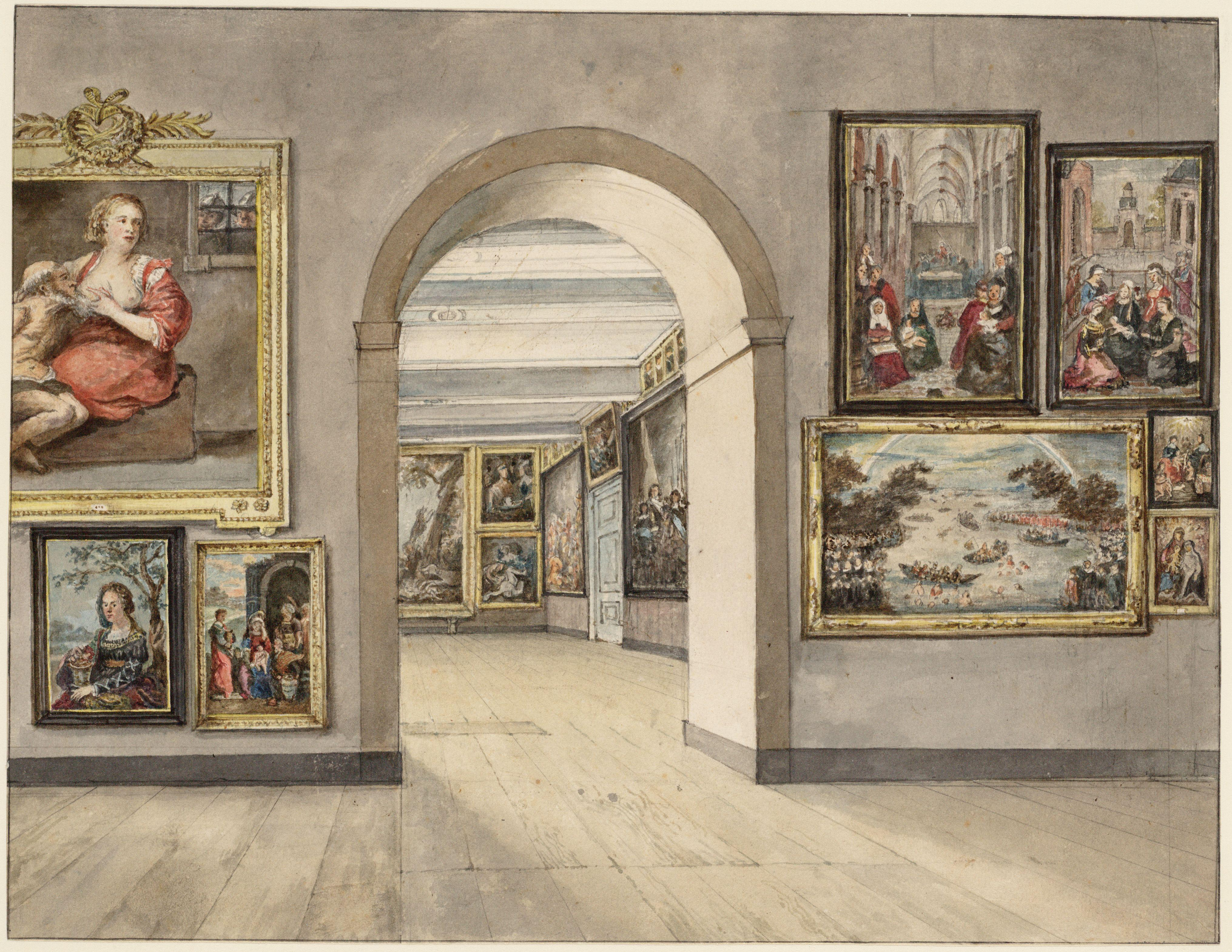
This painting can be seen hanging in a 19th-century sketch of the gallery of the Trippenhuis before the collection was moved to its present location in 1885

This painting has been considered a highlight of the collection since it was bought in 1808 and has been included in all Highlights of the Rijksmuseum catalogs. It was appropriated for the national art collection in September 1798 during the French occupation for the National Kunst Galerie in the Hague, from the collections of William V, Prince of Orange. This appropriation was a tactical move to secure certain works from being abducted by the French to Paris, which had happened with the larger part of the Prince William V Gallery in 1795 after the Prince fled to England. Fishing for Souls has remained in the national collection ever since.
